= Scorpions discography =

Cataloging of published recordings by the German rock band Scorpions

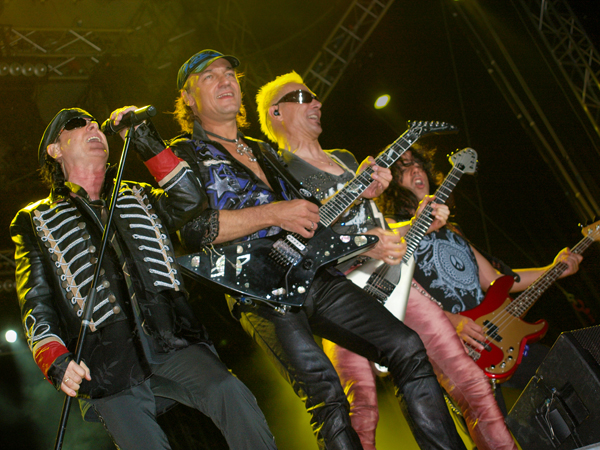
- Studio albums: 19
- Live albums: 6
- Compilation albums: 29
- Singles: 81
- Video albums: 14
- Music videos: 47
- Covers: 23

The following is a comprehensive discography of Scorpions, a German rock band. The band have released 19 studio albums, six live albums, 14 video albums, 29 compilation albums, one cover album, 81 singles and 47 music videos. They have sold between 75 and 100 million records worldwide.

== Albums ==
=== Studio albums ===
List of studio albums, with selected chart positions and certifications
Title	Album details	Peak chart positions										Certifications
Title	Album details	GER	AUS	AUT	CAN	FRA	NLD	SWE	SWI	UK	US	Certifications
Lonesome Crow	Released: February 1972; Label: Brain	62	—	—	—	—	—	—	54	—	—	
Fly to the Rainbow	Released: 1 November 1974; Label: RCA	—	—	—	—	—	—	—	—	—	—	
In Trance	Released: 17 September 1975; Label: RCA	—	—	—	—	—	—	—	—	—	—	
Virgin Killer	Released: 22 November 1976; Label: RCA	—	—	—	—	—	—	—	—	—	—	
Taken by Force	Released: December 1977; Label: RCA	—	—	—	—	—	—	—	—	—	—	
Lovedrive	Released: February 1979; Label: Harvest	11	—	—	—	—	—	32	—	36	55	BVMI: Gold; SNEP: Gold; RIAA: Gold
Animal Magnetism	Released: 31 March 1980; Label: Harvest	12	—	—	76	—	—	37	—	23	52	MC: Gold; RIAA: Platinum
Blackout	Released: 29 March 1982; Label: Harvest	10	—	—	11	12	45	12	77	11	10	SNEP: Gold; MC: Platinum; RIAA: Platinum
Love at First Sting	Released: 27 March 1984; Label: Harvest	6	—	19	15	4	—	17	9	17	6	BVMI: Gold; MC: 2× Platinum; RIAA: 3× Platinum
Savage Amusement	Released: 18 April 1988; Label: Harvest	4	—	18	25	16	24	2	5	18	5	BVMI: Gold; IFPI FIN: Gold; SNEP: Gold; MC: Platinum; RIAA: Platinum
Crazy World	Released: 6 November 1990; Label: Vertigo	1	49	1	20	2	6	6	3	27	21	BPI: Silver; BVMI: 2× Platinum; IFPI FIN: Gold; IFPI SWI: Gold; MC: 2× Platinum; RIAA: 2× Platinum
Face the Heat	Released: 21 September 1993; Label: Mercury	4	—	12	34	5	34	15	9	51	24	IFPI SWI: Gold; SNEP: Gold
Pure Instinct	Released: 21 May 1996; Label: East West	8	—	20	—	11	95	38	15	—	99	BVMI: Gold; IFPI FIN: Gold; SNEP: Gold
Eye II Eye	Released: 9 March 1999; Label: East West	6	—	—	—	50	—	—	49	—	—	
Unbreakable	Released: 22 June 2004; Label: Ariola	4	—	30	—	42	—	14	19	—	—	
Humanity: Hour I	Released: 14 May 2007; Label: Sony Music	9	—	41	—	16	91	36	27	—	63	
Sting in the Tail	Released: 19 March 2010; Label: Sony Music	2	—	6	22	16	71	14	6	96	23	BVMI: Platinum
Return to Forever	Released: 20 February 2015; Label: RCA / SevenOne Music	2	—	11	16	5	39	17	2	31	65	
Rock Believer	Released: 25 February 2022; Label: Vertigo Berlin	2	—	4	60	2	15	6	2	18	59	
"—" denotes a recording that did not chart or was not released in that territory.

=== Live albums ===
Title	Album details	Peak chart positions										Certifications
Title	Album details	GER	AUT	CAN	FIN	FRA	NLD	SWE	SWI	UK	US	Certifications
Tokyo Tapes	Released: 15 August 1978; Label: RCA	35	—	—	—	14	—	42	—	—	—	SNEP: Gold
World Wide Live	Released: 17 June 1985; Label: Harvest/EMI	4	4	39	9	20	47	9	18	18	17	BVMI: Gold; MC: Platinum; RIAA: Platinum; SNEP: Gold
Live Bites	Released: 3 April 1995; Label: PolyGram	66	—	—	—	—	—	—	—	—	—	
Acoustica	Released: 14 May 2001; Label: East West	13	—	—	—	46	—	—	35	—	—	BVMI: Gold
Live 2011: Get Your Sting and Blackout	Released: 14 October 2011; Label: Sony Music	—	—	—	—	—	—	—	—	—	—	
MTV Unplugged – Live in Athens	Released: 29 November 2013; Label: Sony Music	5	37	—	—	85	—	—	29	—	113	BVMI: Gold
Coming Home Live	Released: 5 December 2025; Labels: Spinefarm Records, Vertigo Records and BMG Entertainment	2	13	—	—	34	—	—	14	—	—	
"—" denotes items which were not released in that country or failed to chart.

=== Re-recording albums ===
Title	Album details	Peak chart positions					Certifications
Title	Album details	GER	AUT	FRA^{[!]}	SWI	US	Certifications
Moment of Glory (with the "Berlin Philharmonic Orchestra")	Released: 29 August 2000; Label: EMI Classics	3	—	70	—	—	BVMI: Gold
Comeblack	Released: 4 November 2011; Label: Sony Music	25	67	22	33	90	—
"—" denotes items which were not released in that country or failed to chart.

=== Compilation albums ===
Title	Album details	Peak chart positions								Certifications
Title	Album details	GER	AUT	FIN	FRA^{[!]}	NLD	SWE	SWI	US	Certifications
Best of Scorpions	Released: 17 November 1979; Label: RCA	—	—	—	—	—	—	—	180	—
Hot & Heavy	Released: 4 May 1982; Label: RCA	—	—	—	—	—	—	—	—	—
Best of Scorpions Vol. 2	Released: 10 July 1984; Label: RCA	—	—	—	—	—	—	—	175	—
Gold Ballads	Released: 13 October 1984; Label: Harvest/EMI	25	—	—	—	11	—	7	—	—
Best of Rockers 'n' Ballads	Released: 29 November 1989; Label: EMI	14	—	16	—	92	35	21	43	BVMI: Gold; IFPI FIN: Gold; IFPI SWI: Gold; MC: Gold; RIAA: Platinum
Hot & Slow: The Best of the Ballads	Released: 22 October 1991; Label: RCA	—	—	—	—	—	—	—	—	SNEP: Gold
Still Loving You	Released: 6 April 1992; Label: Harvest/EMI	18	32	3	4	16	30	24	—	IFPI FIN: Platinum; SNEP: Gold
Hot & Hard	Released: 23 August 1993; Label: RCA	—	—	—	—	—	—	—	—	—
Deadly Sting	Released: 2 February 1995; Label: EMI	28	39	13	15	—	—	32	—	—
Born to Touch Your Feelings	Released: 20 March 1995; Label: RCA	—	—	—	—	—	—	—	—	—
Still Loving You – The Best Of	Released: 14 March 1997; Label: Odeon	—	—	—	—	—	—	—	—	—
Hot & Slow: Best Masters of the 70's	Released: 28 September 1998; Label: BMG	—	—	—	—	—	—	—	—	—
Big City Nights	Released: 11 July 1998; Label: Universal	—	—	—	—	—	—	—	—	—
Best	Released: 17 September 1999; Label: EMI	—	—	12	8	—	19	—	—	IFPI FIN: Gold; SNEP: 2× Gold
Pictured Life: All The Best	Released: 13 March 2000; Label: BMG	—	—	—	—	—	—	—	—	—
The Best of Scorpions: 20th Century Masters – The Millennium Collection	Released: 12 June 2001; Label: Mercury	—	—	—	—	—	—	—	198	—
Bad for Good	Released: 28 May 2002; Label: Hip-O	—	—	—	—	—	—	—	161	—
Classic Bites	Released: 8 July 2002; Label: Mercury	—	—	—	—	—	—	—	—	—
Ballads	Released: 23 December 2003; Label: EMI	—	—	—	—	—	—	—	—	—
Box of Scorpions	Released: 5 May 2004; Label: Hip-O	—	—	—	—	—	—	—	—	—
The Platinum Collection	Released: 30 September 2005; Label: EMI	—	—	7	5	—	—	—	—	—
No. 1's	Released: 18 April 2006; Label: EMI	—	—	—	—	—	—	—	—	—
Gold	Released: 25 April 2006; Label: Hip-O	—	—	—	—	—	—	—	—	—
Deadliest Stings: Greatest Hits	Released: 27 November 2007; Label: Warner	—	—	—	—	—	—	—	—	—
Icon	Released: 2 November 2010; Label: Island	—	—	—	—	—	—	—	—	—
Icon 2	Released: 2 November 2010; Label: Island	—	—	—	—	—	—	—	—	—
Wind of Change: The Collection	Released: 20 May 2013; Label: Universal	—	—	—	—	—	—	—	—	—
Born to Touch Your Feelings: Best of Rock Ballads	Released: 24 November 2017; Label: RCA	42	—	—	81	—	—	48	—	—
From the First Sting: The Best of 60 Years	Released: 17 October 2025; Label: BMG	10	23	—	49	—	19	—	—	—
"—" denotes items which were not released in that country or failed to chart.

In France compilation albums are not listed on the Top 200 Albums Chart, but instead on a separate chart for compilation albums only. The French chart positions here for the compilation albums are their peak positions on the French Compilation Albums Chart.

== Singles ==
Title	Year	Peak chart positions											Certifications	Album
Title	Year	GER	AUS	AUT	CAN	FRA	NLD	SWE	SWI	UK	US	US Main	Certifications	Album
"I'm Goin' Mad"	1972	—	—	—	—	—	—	—	—	—	—	—		Lonesome Crow
"Speedy's Coming"	1975	—	—	—	—	—	—	—	—	—	—	—		Fly to the Rainbow
"In Trance"	1975	—	—	—	—	—	—	—	—	—	—	—		In Trance
"Virgin Killer"	1976	—	—	—	—	—	—	—	—	—	—	—		Virgin Killer
"Pictured Life"	1977	—	—	—	—	—	—	—	—	—	—	—		Virgin Killer
"He's a Woman – She's a Man"	1977	—	—	—	—	—	—	—	—	—	—	—		Taken by Force
"The Sails of Charon"	1978	—	—	—	—	—	—	—	—	—	—	—		Taken by Force
"All Night Long" (Live)	1979	—	—	—	—	—	—	—	—	—	—	—		Tokyo Tapes
"Loving You Sunday Morning"	1979	—	—	—	—	—	—	—	—		—	—		Lovedrive
"Is There Anybody There?"	1979	—	—	—	—	—	—	—	—	39	—	—		Lovedrive
"Lovedrive"	1979	—	—	—	—	—	—	—	—	39	—	—		Lovedrive
"Another Piece of Meat"	1979	—	—	—	—	—	—	—	—	39	—	—		Lovedrive
"Holiday"	1979	—	—	—	—	—	—	—	—	—	—	—		Lovedrive
"Lady Starlight"	1980	—	—	—	—	—	—	—	—	—	—	—		Animal Magnetism
"Make It Real"	1980	—	—	—	—	—	—	—	—	72	—	—		Animal Magnetism
"The Zoo"	1980	—	—	—	—	—	—	—	—	75	—	—		Animal Magnetism
"Hey You"	1980	—	—	—	—	—	—	—	—	—	—	—		non-album
"No One Like You"	1982	—	—	—	49	—	—	—	—	64	65	1		Blackout
"Now!"	1982	—	—	—	—	—	—	—	—	—	—	—		Blackout
"Can't Live Without You"	1982	—	—	—	—	—	—	—	—	63	—	47		Blackout
"Rock You Like a Hurricane"	1984	—	—	—	37	—	47	—	—	78	25	5	BVMI: Gold; BPI: Gold	Love at First Sting
"Still Loving You"	1984	14	—	—	—	3	5	—	3	—	64	36		Love at First Sting
"Big City Nights"	1984	—	—	—	—	—	—	—	—	76	—	14		Love at First Sting
"I'm Leaving You"	1984	—	—	—	—	—	—	—	—	—	—	56		Love at First Sting
"No One Like You (Live!)"	1985	40	—	—	—	—	—	—	—	—	—	—		World Wide Live
"Still Loving You" (Live)	1985	—	—	—	—	—	—	—	—	—	—	—		World Wide Live
"Rhythm of Love"	1988	—	—	—	—	—	—	—	—	59	75	6		Savage Amusement
"Believe in Love"	1988	—	—	—	—	—	—	—	—	—	—	12		Savage Amusement
"Passion Rules the Game"	1988	—	—	—	—	—	—	—	—	74	—	—		Savage Amusement
"I Can't Explain"	1989	—	—	—	—	—	—	—	—	—	—	5		Best of Rockers 'n' Ballads
"Holiday" (Remix)	1989	—	—	—	—	—	—	—	—	—	—	—		Best of Rockers 'n' Ballads
"Is There Anybody There?" (Long Version)	1990	—	—	—	—	—	—	—	—	—	—	—		Best of Rockers 'n' Ballads
"Tease Me, Please Me"	1990	—	—	—	—	—	—	—	—	—	—	8		Crazy World
"Don't Believe Her"	1990	—	—	—	—	—	—	—	—	77	—	13		Crazy World
"Wind of Change"	1991	1	7	1	10	1	1	1	1	2	4	2	RIAA: Gold; BPI: Gold	Crazy World
"Send Me an Angel"	1991	5	108	8	19	8	4	4	14	27	44	8		Crazy World
"Ветер Перемен (Wind of Change)" (Russian version)	1991	38	—	—	—	—	—	—	—	—	—	—		non-album
"Viento de Cambio (Wind of Change)" (Spanish version)	1991	—	—	—	—	—	—	—	—	—	—	—		non-album
"Hit Between the Eyes"	1992	—	—	—	—	—	—	—	—	—	—	24		Crazy World
"Still Loving You" (Remix)	1992	87	—	—	—	—	—	—	—	—	—	—		Still Loving You
"Living for Tomorrow" (Live)	1992	—	—	—	—	—	—	—	—	—	—	—		Still Loving You
"Alien Nation"	1993	27	—	—	—	—	—	—	—	—	—	10		Face the Heat
"Under the Same Sun"	1993	99	—	—	31	19	—	—	—	—	—	16		Face the Heat
"Woman"	1993	—	—	—	—	—	—	—	—	—	—	15		Face the Heat
"No Pain No Gain"	1994	—	—	—	—	—	—	—	—	—	—	—		Face the Heat
"White Dove"	1995	18	—	—	—	—	—	—	20	—	—	—		Live Bites
"Edge of Time"	1995	—	—	—	—	—	—	—	—	—	—	—		Deadly Sting
"You and I"	1996	22	—	34	—	23	—	37	23	—	—	—		Pure Instinct
"Does Anyone Know"	1996	81	—	—	—	—	—	—	—	—	—	—		Pure Instinct
"Wild Child"	1996	—	—	—	—	—	—	—	—	—	—	19		Pure Instinct
"When You Came into My Life"	1996	97	—	—	—	—	—	—	—	—	—	—		Pure Instinct
"Where the River Flows"	1997	97	—	—	—	—	—	—	—	—	—	—		Pure Instinct
"To Be No. 1"	1999	55	—	—	—	—	—	—	—	168	—	—		Eye II Eye
"Mysterious"	1999	—	—	—	—	—	—	—	—	—	—	26		Eye II Eye
"10 Light Years Away"	1999	—	—	—	—	—	—	—	—	—	—	—		Eye II Eye
"Eye to Eye"	1999	—	—	—	—	—	—	—	—	—	—	—		Eye II Eye
"Moment of Glory" (with Berliner Philharmoniker)	2000	67	—	—	—	—	—	—	—	—	—	—		Moment of Glory
"Hurricane 2000" (with Berliner Philharmoniker)	2000	—	—	—	—	—	—	—	—	—	—	—		Moment of Glory
"Here in My Heart" (with Berliner Philharmoniker & Lyn Liechty)	2000	—	—	—	—	—	—	—	—	91	—	—		Moment of Glory
"When Love Kills Love"	2001	—	—	—	—	—	—	—	—	—	—	—		Acoustica
"Miracle"	2004	—	—	—	—	—	—	—	—	—	—	—		non-album
"You Are the Champion" (with Michael Kleitman)	2004	92	—	—	—	—	—	—	—	—	—	—		non-album
"Humanity"	2007	—	—	—	—	—	—	—	—	—	—	—		Humanity: Hour I
"Love Will Keep Us Alive"	2007	—	—	—	—	—	—	—	—	—	—	—		Humanity: Hour I
"The Game of Life"	2008	—	—	—	—	—	—	—	—	—	—	—		Humanity: Hour I
"The Good Die Young" (featuring Tarja Turunen)	2010	—	—	—	—	—	—	—	—	—	—	—		Sting in the Tail
"Raised on Rock"	2010	—	—	—	—	—	—	—	—	—	—	—		Sting in the Tail
"The Best Is Yet to Come"	2010	—	—	—	—	—	—	—	—	—	—	—		Sting in the Tail
"Sting in the Tail"	2010	—	—	—	—	—	—	—	—	—	—	—		Sting in the Tail
"Still Loving You"	2011	—	—	—	—	—	—	—	—	—	—	—		Comeblack
"Where the River Flows"	2013	—	—	—	—	—	—	—	—	—	—	—		MTV Unplugged – Live in Athens
"Rock You Like a Hurricane" (featuring Johannes Strate)	2014	—	—	—	—	—	—	—	—	—	—	—		MTV Unplugged – Live in Athens
"We Built This House"	2015	—	—	—	—	—	—	—	—	—	—	—		Return to Forever
"Eye of the Storm"	2015	—	—	—	—	—	—	—	—	—	—	—		Return to Forever
"Going out with a Bang"	2015	—	—	—	—	—	—	—	—	—	—	—		Return to Forever
"Rock 'n' Roll Band"	2016	—	—	—	—	—	—	—	—	—	—	—		Return to Forever
"Follow Your Heart"	2017	—	—	—	—	—	—	—	—	—	—	—		Born to Touch Your Feelings: Best of Rock Ballads
"Sign of Hope"	2020	—	—	—	—	—	—	—	—	—	—	—		Digital non-album
"Peacemaker"	2021	—	—	—	—	—	—	—	—	—	—	—		Rock Believer
"Rock Believer"	2022	—	—	—	—	—	—	—	—	—	—	—		Rock Believer
"Seventh Sun"	2022	—	—	—	—	—	—	—	—	—	—	—		Rock Believer
"Shining of Your Soul"	2022	—	—	—	—	—	—	—	—	—	—	—		Rock Believer
"When You Know (Where You Come From)"	2022	—	—	—	—	—	—	—	—	—	—	—		Rock Believer
"—" denotes items which were not released in that country or failed to chart.

== Soundtrack ==
Year	Song	Movie	Description
1972	"Lonesome Crow"	Das Kalte Paradies	German anti-drugs film
1984	"Still Loving You"	Corpo a Corpo	Brazilian soap opera
1992	"Hit Between the Eyes"	Freejack	Starring Anthony Hopkins, Rene Russo, Mick Jagger
1993	"Under the Same Sun"	Sonho Meu	Brazilian soap opera
1993	"Wind of Change"	Melrose Place	Episode: "Irreconcilable Similarities"
1994	"Under the Same Sun"	On Deadly Ground	Starring Steven Seagal
1996	"Rock You Like a Hurricane"	Race the Sun	Starring Halle Berry and James Belushi
1996	"You and I (Special Single Mix)"	Quem É Você?	Brazilian telenovela
1996	"Still Loving You"	Bordello of Blood	Starring Dennis Miller, Erika Eleniak, Angie Everhart, Corey Feldman and Chris Sarandon
1997	"Send Me an Angel"	Lancelot: Guardian of Time	Starring Marc Singer, Claudia Christian, John Saxon and Jerry Levine
1997	"Are You the One?"	A Indomada	Brazilian telenovela
1999	"Rock You Like a Hurricane"	Jawbreaker	Starring Rose McGowan
1999	"Send Me an Angel"	Michael Jackson & Friends	Television special on ZDF, hosted by Thomas Gottschalk and Michelle Hunziker
2000	"Rock You Like a Hurricane"	Little Nicky	Starring Adam Sandler
2002	"No One Like You"	Ash Wednesday	Starring Edward Burns
2004	"Send Me an Angel"	Cold Case	Starring Kathryn Morris
2004	"Rock You Like a Hurricane"	The O.C.	Episode: "The Blaze of Glory"
2005/2010	"Rock You Like a Hurricane" / "No One Like You"	Supernatural	Starring Jared Padalecki and Jensen Ackles
2007	"Rock You Like a Hurricane"	The Simpsons Game	Trailer and game
2007	"No One Like You"	Guitar Hero Encore: Rocks the 80s	Game
2007	"Rock You Like a Hurricane"	Guitar Hero III: Legends of Rock	Game
2007	"Rock You Like a Hurricane"	Knocked Up	Starring Seth Rogen
2007	"Wind of Change"	In Search of a Midnight Kiss	Starring Scoot McNairy
2007/2008	"The Game of Life"	Caminhos do Coração	Brazilian telenovela
2008	"Animal Magnetism"	The Wrestler	Starring Mickey Rourke
2008	"Rock You Like a Hurricane"	Role Models	Starring Seann William Scott
2009	"Wind of Change"	Gentlemen Broncos	Starring Michael Angarano and Jemaine Clement
2009	"Blackout" / "Holiday"	Brütal Legend	Game
2010	"The Sails of Charon"	Gran Turismo 5	Game
2010	"Rock You Like a Hurricane"	Knight and Day	Starring Tom Cruise and Cameron Diaz
2010	"Wind of Change"	Call of Duty: Black Ops	video game
2011	"Hurricane 2000"	Killer Elite	In the trailer. Starring Robert De Niro, Clive Owen and Jason Statham
2011	"Send Me an Angel"	Hung	Episode: "What's Going on Downstairs? or Don't Eat Prince Eric!"
2011	"Wind of Change"	Chuck	Starring Zachary Levi, Yvonne Strahovski and Joshua Gomez
2012	"No One Like You" / "Rock You Like a Hurricane"	Rock of Ages	Starring Julianne Hough, Diego Boneta, Russell Brand, Paul Giamatti, Catherine Zeta-Jones, Malin Åkerman, Mary J. Blige, Alec Baldwin, Tom Cruise and Bryan Cranston
2013	"Rock You Like a Hurricane"	Warm Bodies	Starring Nicholas Hoult
2014	"Rock You Like a Hurricane"	Brooklyn Nine-Nine	Episode: "The Bet"
2014	"Rock You Like a Hurricane"	Let's Be Cops	Starring Jake Johnson, Damon Wayans, Jr.
2014	"Rock You Like a Hurricane"	Scorpion	Episode: "A Cyclone"
2014	"Wind of Change"	The Interview	Starring Seth Rogen, James Franco
2015	"Rock You Like a Hurricane"	A Walk in the Woods	Starring Robert Redford, Nick Nolte and Emma Thompson
2016	"Rock You Like a Hurricane"	The Angry Birds Movie	Starring Jason Sudeikis, Josh Gad, Maya Rudolph, Kate McKinnon, Sean Penn, Tony Hale, Keegan-Michael Key, Bill Hader and Peter Dinklage
2016	"Rock You Like a Hurricane"	It's Always Sunny in Philadelphia	Episode: "Being Frank"
2017	"Rock You Like a Hurricane"	Stranger Things	Starring Winona Ryder, David Harbour, Finn Wolfhard, Millie Bobby Brown, Gaten Matarazzo, Caleb McLaughlin, Natalia Dyer, Charlie Heaton, Cara Buono
2017	"Rock You Like a Hurricane"	GLOW	Episode: "Debbie Does Something"
2017	"Rock You Like a Hurricane"	Trial & Error	Episode: "The Verdict"
2017	"Rock You Like a Hurricane"	The Big Bang Theory	Starring Johnny Galecki, Jim Parsons, Kaley Cuoco, Simon Helberg, Kunal Nayyar, Sara Gilbert, Mayim Bialik, Melissa Rauch, Kevin Sussman
2017	"The Zoo"	NBA 2K18	video game
2018	"Rock You Like a Hurricane"	The Hurricane Heist	Starring Toby Kebbell, Maggie Grace, Ryan Kwanten, Ralph Ineson
2018	"Rock You Like a Hurricane"	LA to Vegas	Episode: "Two and a Half Pilots"
2018	"Wind of Change"	The Spy Who Dumped Me	Starring Mila Kunis, Kate McKinnon, Justin Theroux
2018	"Rock You Like a Hurricane"	The Romanoffs	Episode: "The One That Holds Everything"
2019	"Still Loving You"	Ibiza	Starring Christian Clavier, Mathilde Seigner, Leopold Buchsbaum
2021	"No One Like You"	Hightown	Episode: "Fresh as a Daisy"
2021	"Still Loving You"	MacGruber	Episode: "A Good Day to Die"
2022	"Rock you Like a Hurricane"	The Boys	Episode: "Barbary Coast"

== Covers ==
Year	Song	Album	Description	Original
1975	"Fuchs geh' voran" / "Wenn es richtig losgeht"	"The Hunters" (single)	Originally released as a single; German versions of "Fox on the Run" and "Action"	Sweet
1978	"Kōjō no Tsuki"	Tokyo Tapes	Recorded in Tokyo. Japanese song. New arrangements by the band	Rentarō Taki
1978	"Hound Dog"	Tokyo Tapes	Recorded in Tokyo. Medley with "Long Tall Sally"	Big Mama Thornton
1978	"Long Tall Sally"	Tokyo Tapes	Recorded in Tokyo. Medley with "Hound Dog"	Little Richard
1989	"I Can't Explain"	Best of Rockers 'n' Ballads	—	The Who
1990	"In the Flesh?"	The Wall – Live in Berlin	Opening song of the show, hosted by Roger Waters	Pink Floyd
1992	"White Dove"	"White Dove" (single) / Live Bites	English version of the song Gyöngyhajú lány. Recorded in support of UNICEF for Rwandan aid	Omega
1992	"Ave Maria No Morro"	"White Dove" (single B-side)	—	Trio de Ouro
1993	"(Marie's the Name) His Latest Flame"	Face the Heat (hidden bonus track)	Also performed live on Elvis: The Tribute televised Memphis, TN concert, 8 October 1994	Elvis Presley
2000	"Here in My Heart"	Moment of Glory	—	Tiffany
2001	"Love of My Life"	Acoustica	—	Queen
2001	"Dust in the Wind"	Acoustica	—	Kansas
2001	"Drive"	Acoustica	—	The Cars
2004	"You Are the Champion"	"You Are the Champion" (single) / Stand Up for the Champion – Michael Schumacher	Recorded with Michael Kleitmann in honor of Michael Schumacher winning his seventh Formula One Championship	Queen
2011	"Tainted Love"	Comeblack	—	Gloria Jones
2011	"Children of the Revolution"	Comeblack	—	T. Rex
2011	"Across the Universe"	Comeblack	—	The Beatles
2011	"Tin Soldier"	Comeblack	—	Small Faces
2011	"All Day and All of the Night"	Comeblack	—	The Kinks
2011	"Ruby Tuesday"	Comeblack	—	The Rolling Stones
2011	"Shapes of Things"	Comeblack	—	The Yardbirds
2014	"The Temple of the King"	Ronnie James Dio – This Is Your Life	Recorded in tribute to Ronnie James Dio	Rainbow

== Videography ==
=== Video albums ===
Year	Title	Certifications
1985	First Sting (Betamax, VHS and LaserDisc; four single promos)	—
1985	World Wide Live (VHS, LaserDisc and DVD; live 1984 and interviews)	RIAA: Gold
1985	To Russia with Love and Other Savage Amusements (VHS and LaserDisc; live 1988 and interviews)	RIAA: Gold
1991	Crazy World Tour Live... Berlin 1991 (VHS, VCD, LaserDisc and DVD; live 1990 and four single promos) Reissued and expanded as A Savage Crazy World DVD	—
2001	Moment of Glory – Berliner Philharmoniker Live (VHS, VCD, DVD and Blu-ray; live 2000 and interviews)	MC: Gold
2001	Acoustica (VHS, VCD and DVD; live 2001 and interviews)	PMB: Platinum
2002	A Savage Crazy World (DVD; Crazy World Tour Live... Berlin 1991 and 16 single promos)	—
2004	Unbreakable World Tour 2004: One Night in Vienna (VCD and DVD; live 2004 and documentary)	—
2007	Live at Wacken Open Air 2006 (DVD; live 2006)	—
2009	Amazônia – Live in the Jungle (DVD; live 2008 and documentary)	SNEP: Gold
2011	Live in 3D – Get Your Sting & Blackout (Blu-ray; live 2010-2011 and documentary)	—
2013	MTV Unplugged – Live in Athens (DVD and Blu-ray; live 2013 and documentary)	—
2015	Return to Forever — Tour Edition: Live at Hellfest, France (DVD; live 20 June 2015 and interviews); Live in Brooklyn, NY (DVD; live 12 September 2015, four single promos, documentary and interviews)	—
2016	Forever and a Day – Live In Munich 2012 (DVD and Blu-ray; documentary and live 2012)	—

=== Music videos ===
Year	Title	Album	Director(s)
1982	"No One Like You"	Blackout	Marty Callner and Hart Perry
1982	"Arizona"	Blackout	
1984	"I'm Leaving You"	Love at First Sting	Martin Kahan
1984	"Rock You Like a Hurricane"	Love at First Sting	David Mallet
1984	"Still Loving You"	Love at First Sting	Hart Perry
1985	"Rock You Like a Hurricane" (PCM Version)	Love at First Sting	David Mallet
1985	"Big City Nights"	World Wide Live	Marty Callner and Richard Perry
1988	"Rhythm of Love"	Savage Amusement	Marty Callner
1988	"Believe in Love"	Savage Amusement	Marty Callner
1988	"Passion Rules the Game"	Savage Amusement	—N/a
1989	"I Can't Explain"	Best of Rockers 'n' Ballads	—N/a
1990	"Tease Me Please Me"	Crazy World	—N/a
1990	"Don't Believe Her"	Crazy World	—N/a
1990	"Wind of Change"	Crazy World	—N/a
1990	"Send Me an Angel"	Crazy World	Meiert Avis
1991	"Wind of Change" (World Events Version)	Crazy World	Wayne Isham
1992	"Hit Between the Eyes"	Crazy World	—N/a
1993	"Alien Nation"	Face the Heat	Matt Mahurin
1993	"No Pain No Gain"	Face the Heat	—N/a
1993	"Woman"	Face the Heat	Jeff "Baschi" Richter
1993	"Under the Same Sun"	Face the Heat	Peter Christopherson and Wayne Isham
1994	"White Dove"	Live Bites	—N/a
1996	"You and I"	Pure Instinct	Marcus Nispel
1996	"When You Came into My Life"	Pure Instinct	—N/a
1996	"Does Anyone Know"	Pure Instinct	—N/a
1998	"Holiday" (live)	World Wide Live	
1999	"To Be No. 1"	Eye II Eye	David Mallet
1999	"What You Give You Give Back"	Eye II Eye	—N/a
1999	"A Moment in a Million Years"	Eye II Eye	—N/a
2000	"Hurricane 2000"	Moment of Glory	Pit Weyrich
2000	"Moment of Glory"	Moment of Glory	Pit Weyrich
2000	"Here in My Heart"	Moment of Glory	Pit Weyrich
2004	"Remember the Good Times"	Unbreakable	Hannes Rossacher
2007	"Humanity"	Humanity: Hour I	—N/a
2010	"The Good Die Young"	Sting in the Tail	Nikolaj Georgiew
2011	"All Day and All of the Night"	Comeblack	Oliver Sommer
2011	"Across the Universe"	Comeblack	Oliver Sommer
2011	"Children of the Revolution"	Comeblack	Oliver Sommer
2011	"Tainted Love"	Comeblack	Oliver Sommer
2011	"Ruby Tuesday"	Comeblack	Oliver Sommer
2014	"Rock You Like a Hurricane" (featuring Johannes Strate)	MTV Unplugged – Live in Athens	Sven Offen
2015	"We Built This House"	Return to Forever	Joern Heitmann
2015	"Going Out With a Bang"	Return to Forever	Dennis Dirksen
2016	"Rock 'n' Roll Band" (live)	Return to Forever	
2021	"Peacemaker"	Rock Believer	Joern Heitmann & Hinrich Pflug
2022	"Rock Believer"	Rock Believer	Joern Heitmann & Hinrich Pflug
2022	"When You Know (Where You Come From)"	Rock Believer	Joern Heitmann & Hinrich Pflug
