= Gold (Scorpions album) =

2006 greatest hits album by Scorpions

Greatest hits album by Scorpions
- Released: April 25, 2006
- Recorded: 1972–2002
- Genre: Hard rock, heavy metal
- Length: 0:28:22
- Label: Hip-O

Scorpions compilations chronology
Box of Scorpions (2004)	Gold (2006)	No.1's (2006)

Gold is a compilation album by German hard rock band Scorpions. It was released in 2006 on Hip-O Records.

== Background ==
The record, released as part of the Gold album series, is one of the group's few career-spanning sets. It features the Scorpions' better-known Mercury Records material, as well as earlier tunes with Uli Jon Roth.

Although Gold was released in 2006, it spanned the era between 1972 and 2002. It culled at least one song from all but two studio albums during that period, while also adding several studio tracks previously released on compilations (although "Over the Top" was not released on 1995 European edition of Deadly Sting) and one live track. Songs from the album Pure Instinct (1996) and Eye II Eye (1999) were not represented in this release.

== Track listing ==
=== Disc one ===
All tracks are written by Rudolf Schenker and Klaus Meine, except noted.

No.	Title	Original release (date)	Length
1.	"It All Depends" (Michael Schenker, Rudolf Schenker, Klaus Meine, Wolfgang Dziony, Lothar Heimberg)	Lonesome Crow (1972)	3:24
2.	"Speedy's Coming"	Fly to the Rainbow (1974)	3:33
3.	"In Trance"	In Trance (1975)	4:43
4.	"Pictured Life" (R. Schenker, Meine, Uli Jon Roth)	Virgin Killer (1976)	3:23
5.	"Catch Your Train"	Virgin Killer	3:34
6.	"Virgin Killer" (Roth)	Virgin Killer	3:42
7.	"Steamrock Fever"	Taken by Force (1977)	3:37
8.	"We'll Burn the Sky" (R. Schenker, Monika Dannemann)	Taken by Force	6:27
9.	"The Sails of Charon" (Roth)	Taken by Force	4:23
10.	"Top of the Bill" (Live)	Tokyo Tapes (1978)	6:47
11.	"Loving You Sunday Morning" (R. Schenker, Meine, Herman Rarebell)	Lovedrive (1979)	5:37
12.	"Holiday"	Lovedrive	6:30
13.	"Lovedrive"	Lovedrive	4:48
14.	"The Zoo"	Animal Magnetism (1980)	5:30
15.	"Can't Live Without You"	Blackout (1982)	3:46
16.	"Dynamite" (R. Schenker, Meine, Rarebell)	Blackout	4:13
17.	"Blackout" (R. Schenker, Meine, Rarebell, Sonja Kittelsen)	Blackout	3:47

=== Disc two ===
All tracks are written by Rudolf Schenker and Klaus Meine, except noted.

No.	Title	Original release (date)	Length
1.	"No One Like You"	Blackout	3:57
2.	"Rock You Like a Hurricane" (Schenker, Meine, Rarebell)	Love at First Sting (1984)	4:12
3.	"Big City Nights"	Love at First Sting	4:08
4.	"Still Loving You"	Love at First Sting	6:25
5.	"Rhythm of Love"	Savage Amusement (1988)	3:48
6.	"Believe in Love"	Savage Amusement	5:23
7.	"I Can't Explain" (The Who cover, written by Pete Townshend)	Best of Rockers 'n' Ballads (1989)	3:22
8.	"Tease Me Please Me" (Meine, Rarebell, Matthias Jabs, Jim Vallance)	Crazy World (1990)	4:43
9.	"Don't Believe Her" (Schenker, Meine, Rarebell, Vallance)	Crazy World	4:54
10.	"Wind of Change" (Meine)	Crazy World	5:11
11.	"Send Me an Angel"	Crazy World	4:32
12.	"Hit Between the Eyes" (Schenker, Meine, Rarebell, Vallance)	Crazy World	4:32
13.	"Alien Nation"	Face the Heat (1993)	5:44
14.	"Under the Same Sun" (Meine, Mark Hudson, Scott Fairbairn)	Face the Heat	4:52
15.	"Woman"	Face the Heat	5:55
16.	"Over the Top" (Jabs)	Deadly Sting: The Mercury Years (US release, 1997)	4:23
17.	"'Cause I Love You"	Bad for Good: The Very Best of Scorpions (2002)	3:44
