= Deadly Sting =

Compilation album by Scorpions
- Released: February 2, 1995 (Europe); July 15, 1997 (United States)
- Recorded: 1978–1995
- Genre: Heavy metal, glam metal, hard rock
- Length: 68:49, 76:07 (France) and 156:22 (US release)
- Label: EMI and Mercury (US release)
- Producer: Various

Scorpions compilations chronology
Hot & Hard (1993)	Deadly Sting (1995)	Born to Touch Your Feelings (1995)

Singles from Deadly Sting
- 1. "Edge of Time / No One Like You" Released: 1995; 2. "Over the Top" Released: 1997

Alternative Cover

Professional ratings
Review scores
Source	Rating
Allmusic	4.5/5 stars

Deadly Sting is a compilation album of hits and previously unreleased material by the German hard rock band Scorpions. The songs were culled from their catalog on the European Electrola and American Mercury labels.

== Background ==
Deadly Sting was released both as a single disc in 1995 and an expanded double-disc version in 1997. The single-disc album has 15 or 18 tracks depending on the country of release, which span from 1978 to 1988. The double-disc US release has 33 songs ranging from 1978 to 1995, including several previously unreleased studio tracks.

The original cover art gained controversy, as it depicted a naked woman being stung by a column of scorpions. An alternative cover with the woman airbrushed out was printed, which was used for the double-disc version of the album, subtitled The Mercury Years.

== Track listings ==
=== 1995 European release ===
1. "Coming Home" – 4:59 (from the album Love at First Sting – 1984)
2. "Rock You Like a Hurricane" – 4:12 (from the album Love at First Sting)
3. "No One Like You" – 3:57 (from the album Blackout – 1982)
4. "Lovedrive" – 4:49 (from the album Lovedrive – 1979)
5. "Bad Boys Running Wild" – 3:55 (from the album Love at First Sting)
6. "I'm Leaving You" – 4:17 (from the album Love at First Sting)
7. "Passion Rules the Game" – 3:59 (from the album Savage Amusement – 1988)
8. "China White" – 6:56 (from the album Blackout)
9. "Walking on the Edge" – 5:07 (from the album Savage Amusement)
10. "Coast to Coast" – 4:42 (from the album Lovedrive)
11. "Loving You Sunday Morning" – 5:37 (from the album Lovedrive)
12. "Another Piece of Meat" – 3:31 (from the album Lovedrive)
13. "Dynamite" – 4:12 (from the album Blackout)
14. "Can't Live Without You" – 3:46 (from the album Blackout)
15. "Edge of Time" (Rudolf Schenker, Klaus Meine) – 4:17 (previously unreleased)

=== French edition bonus tracks ===
16. "Still Loving You" – 3:56 (from the album Love at First Sting)
17. "Can't Get Enough (Part 1)" (live) – 2:06 (from the album World Wide Live – 1985)
18. "Can't Get Enough" (Part 2)" (live) – 1:42 (from the album World Wide Live)

=== 1997 US release ===
Disc one

1. "Loving You Sunday Morning" – 5:37 (from the album Lovedrive)
2. "Lovedrive (Remix)" – 4:53 (from the album Lovedrive)
3. "Holiday (Remix)" – 6:49 (from the album Lovedrive)
4. "Make it Real" – 3:50 (from the album Animal Magnetism – 1980)
5. "The Zoo" – 5:30 (from the album Animal Magnetism)
6. "Blackout" – 3:48 (from the album Blackout)
7. "Can't Live Without You" – 3:47 (from the album Blackout)
8. "No One Like You" – 3:58 (from the album Blackout)
9. "China White" – 6:57 (from the album Blackout)
10. "Dynamite" – 4:14 (from the album Blackout)
11. "Bad Boys Running Wild" – 3:56 (from the album Love at First Sting)
12. "Rock You Like a Hurricane" – 4:14 (from the album Love at First Sting)
13. "Coming Home" – 5:00 (from the album Love at First Sting)
14. "Big City Nights" – 4:11 (from the album Love at First Sting)
15. "Still Loving You" – 6:29 (from the album Love at First Sting)
16. "Coast to Coast" (live) – 4:53 (from the album World Wide Live)

Disc two

1. "Don't Stop at the Top" – 4:04 (from the album Savage Amusement)
2. "Rhythm of Love" – 3:49 (from the album Savage Amusement)
3. "Passion Rules the Game" – 4:01 (from the album Savage Amusement)
4. "Walking on the Edge" – 5:09 (from the album Savage Amusement)
5. "Believe in Love" – 5:24 (from the album Savage Amusement)
6. "I Can't Explain" – 3:22 (from the album Best of Rockers 'n' Ballads – 1989)
7. "Tease Me Please Me" – 4:45 (from the album Crazy World – 1990)
8. "Don't Believe Her" – 4:56 (from the album Crazy World)
9. "Wind of Change" – 5:13 (from the album Crazy World)
10. "Hit Between the Eyes" – 4:33 (from the album Crazy World)
11. "Send Me an Angel" – 4:34 (from the album Crazy World)
12. "Alien Nation" – 5:45 (from the album Face the Heat – 1993)
13. "Under the Same Sun" – 4:54 (from the album Face the Heat)
14. "Woman" – 5:58 (from the album Face the Heat)
15. "In Trance" (live) – 4:13 (from the album Live Bites – 1995)
16. "Over the Top" (Matthias Jabs) – 4:25 (previously unreleased)
17. "Life Goes Around" (Klaus Meine) – 3:41 (previously unreleased)

== Charts ==
Chart (1995)	Peak position
Austrian Albums (Ö3 Austria)	39
Finnish Albums (The Official Finnish Charts)	13
French Albums (SNEP)	15
German Albums (Offizielle Top 100)	28
Swiss Albums (Schweizer Hitparade)	32
