= Still Loving You (album) =

Compilation album by Scorpions
- Released: 6 April 1992
- Recorded: 1977–1991
- Genres: Hard rock, heavy metal
- Length: 61:38
- Label: Harvest/EMI
- Producers: Dieter Dierks (10 tracks); Keith Olsen & Scorpions (track 6)

Scorpions compilations chronology
Hot & Slow: The Best of the Ballads (1991)	Still Loving You (1992)	Hot & Hard (1993)

Professional ratings
Review scores
Source	Rating
Allmusic	2.5/5 stars

Still Loving You is a compilation album by the German hard rock band Scorpions.

== Background ==
Subtitled More Gold Ballads, the record is a follow-up to the 1985 compilation Gold Ballads. Nine of the tracks were remixed for this album by Erwin Musper at Wisseloord Studios, Hilversum, the Netherlands. The song "Living for Tomorrow" appears here for the first time.

== Track listing ==
1. "Believe in Love - Remix" (Rudolf Schenker, Klaus Meine) – 4:54 (originally released in 1988 on the album Savage Amusement; Klaus Meine's vocals were re-recorded for this track, which has slightly different lyrics)
2. "Still Loving You - Remix" (Schenker, Meine) – 6:12 (originally released in 1984 on the album Love at First Sting)
3. "Walking on the Edge - Remix" (Schenker, Meine) – 4:50 (originally released in 1988 on the album Savage Amusement)
4. "Born to Touch Your Feelings - Remix" (Schenker, Meine) – 7:21 (originally released in 1977 on the album Taken by Force)
5. "Lady Starlight - Remix" (Schenker, Meine) – 6:26 (originally released in 1980 on the album Animal Magnetism; Meine's vocals were also re-recorded for this track)
6. "Wind of Change" (Meine) – 5:10 (from the album Crazy World)
7. "Is There Anybody There? - Remix" (Schenker, Meine, Herman Rarebell) – 4:16 (originally released in 1979 on the album Lovedrive; this is a different remix than the one on Best of Rockers 'n' Ballads)
8. "Always Somewhere - Remix" (Schenker, Meine) – 4:57 (originally released in 1979 on the album Lovedrive)
9. "Holiday - Remix" (Schenker, Meine) – 6:26 (originally released in 1979 on the album Lovedrive; this is also a different remix than the one on Best of Rockers 'n' Ballads)
10. "When the Smoke Is Going Down - Remix" (Schenker, Meine) – 3:51 (originally released in 1982 on the album Blackout)
11. "Living for Tomorrow" (live) (Schenker, Meine) – 7:14 (previously unreleased; recorded live in Leningrad, now Saint Petersburg, 26 April 1988. Later appeared on the live album Live Bites)

== Personnel ==
- Klaus Meine – vocals
- Rudolf Schenker – rhythm guitar, lead guitar on tracks 2, 5, 6, 10
- Matthias Jabs – lead guitar except tracks 4 and 9, rhythm guitar on tracks 2, 5, 6, 10
- Francis Buchholz – bass
- Herman Rarebell – drums
- Ulrich Roth – lead guitar on "Born to Touch Your Feelings"
- Michael Schenker – lead and acoustic guitars on "Holiday"

== Singles ==
=== Still Loving You ===
"Still Loving You"

Single by Scorpions
- Released: 1992
- Genre: Heavy metal
- Label: Harvest/EMI

Released in Europe as a CD single.

1. "Still Loving You - Remix" – 6:12
2. "Still Loving You - Remix Radio Version" – 3:58
3. "Media Overkill" – 3:34 (from the album Savage Amusement)

=== Living for Tomorrow ===
"Living for Tomorrow"

Single by Scorpions
- Released: 1992
- Genre: Heavy metal
- Label: Harvest/Electrola

"Living for Tomorrow" was released in Europe as a 7" vinyl and CD single. The single contained an edited version of the song that eliminated the spoken introduction and faded the ending. This version was used in television advertising for Mustang Jeans, a German clothing company, and their logo appeared on the single's sleeve.

1. "Living for Tomorrow" – 3:35
2. "Bad Boys Running Wild" – 3:53 (from the album Love at First Sting)

== Charts ==
Chart (1992)	Peak position
Austrian Albums (Ö3 Austria)	32
Belgian Albums (Ultratop Wallonia)	40
Dutch Albums (Album Top 100)	16
Finnish Albums (The Official Finnish Charts)	2
French Albums (SNEP)	4
German Albums (Offizielle Top 100)	18
Italian Albums (Musica e Dischi)	15
Norwegian Albums (VG-lista)	14
Portuguese Album Charts (AFP)	1
Swedish Albums (Sverigetopplistan)	30
Swiss Albums (Schweizer Hitparade)	24

== Certifications and sales ==
Region	Certification	Certified units/sales
Finland (Musiikkituottajat)	Platinum	50,000
France (SNEP)	Gold	100,000^{*}
Germany (BVMI)	Gold	250,000^{^}
Italy (FIMI)	Gold	100,000
Malaysia	3× Platinum	75,000
Portugal (AFP)	Platinum	40,000^{^}
Singapore	—	24,000
Switzerland (IFPI Switzerland)	Gold	25,000^{^}
^{*} Sales figures based on certification alone.^{^} Shipments figures based on certification alone.
