= Acoustica (Scorpions album) =

2021 studio album by Scorpions

Live album by Scorpions
- Released: 14 May 2001
- Recorded: 8–10 February 2001
- Venues: Convento do Beato (Lisbon, Portugal)
- Genre: Acoustic rock
- Length: 70:20
- Label: East West
- Producers: Scorpions; Christian Kolonovits

Scorpions chronology
Moment of Glory (2000)	Acoustica (2001)	Bad for Good: The Very Best of Scorpions (2002)

Scorpions live albums chronology
Live Bites (1995)	Acoustica (2001)	Live 2011: Get Your Sting & Blackout (2011)

Singles from Acoustica
- 1. "When Love Kills Love" Released: 2001

Acoustica

Video by Scorpions
- Released: 14 May 2001
- Recorded: 8–10 February 2001
- Venues: Convento do Beato (Lisbon, Portugal)
- Genre: Acoustic rock
- Length: 110 min.
- Label: Warner Music Vision
- Directors: Rudi Dolezal and Hannes Rossacher
- Producer: DoRo Productions

Scorpions video albums chronology
Moment of Glory Live (2000)	Acoustica (2001)	A Savage Crazy World (2002)

Professional ratings
Review scores
Source	Rating
AllMusic	2.5/5 stars

Acoustica is an unplugged live album by German hard rock band Scorpions. It was released in 2001 on East West Records.

== Background ==
Acoustica was recorded during three concerts held in February 2001 at the Convento do Beato in Lisbon, Portugal. It was a most unusual set for the band, as Klaus Meine comments on the DVD. The group was supported by female backing vocalists, a percussionist, an extra guitarist, and Christian Kolonovits on keyboards. Kolonovits also collaborated on rearranging the songs for the acoustic set. He had previously worked with the band as a conductor and arranger on the Moment of Glory album.

Scorpions performed four new songs: "Life Is Too Short", "Back to You", "I Wanted to Cry" and "When Love Kills Love", the last of which was released as a single. All the new songs were featured on the VHS, while "Back to You" and five other previously recorded songs were omitted from the CD.

Acoustica also contains cover versions of The Cars' "Drive", Kansas' "Dust in the Wind", and the Queen hit "Love of My Life".

In 2003, an official 'Platinum Edition' was released by Warner Music Thailand, which coupled the original CD with a VCD. The VCD features behind-the-scenes and rehearsal footage as well as a band interview, conducted in English by a Thai television crew.

== Reception ==
The album attained gold status in Brazil, and the DVD attained platinum status. In Portugal the album went straight to No.1, selling 50,000 copies.

== Track listing ==
=== CD ===
All tracks were written by Rudolf Schenker and Klaus Meine, except where noted.

1. "The Zoo" – 5:49 (from Animal Magnetism)
2. "Always Somewhere" – 4:10 (from Lovedrive)
3. "Life Is Too Short" – 5:18
4. "Holiday" – 5:55 (from Lovedrive)
5. "You and I" (Meine) – 5:19 (from Pure Instinct)
6. "When Love Kills Love" – 4:53
7. "Dust in the Wind" (Kerry Livgren) – 3:49 (Kansas cover, from the Point of Know Return album)
8. "Send Me an Angel" – 5:24 (from Crazy World)
9. "Catch Your Train" – 3:46 (from Virgin Killer)
10. "I Wanted to Cry (But the Tears Wouldn't Come)" – 3:47
11. "Wind of Change" (Meine) – 5:34 (from Crazy World)
12. "Love of My Life" (Freddie Mercury) – 2:26 (Queen cover from A Night at the Opera album)
13. "Drive" (Ric Ocasek) – 4:00 (The Cars cover)
14. "Still Loving You" – 5:45 (from Love at First Sting)
15. "Hurricane 2001" (Schenker, Meine, Herman Rarebell) – 4:35 ("Is There Anybody There" for some markets) (Original name: Rock You Like a Hurricane) (from Love at First Sting)
16. "Rhythm of Love" (from Savage Amusement) (Japan Exclusive Bonus Track)
17. "Is There Anybody There" (Schenker, Meine, Rarebell) – 4:29 (from Lovedrive) (Portugal special limited edition bonus track)

=== Platinum Edition VCD ===
- Making of Acoustica (video)
- Band interview (video)
- "When Love Kills Love" (video)
- "Holiday" (video)
- "Drive" (video)
- "Send Me an Angel" (video)
- "Rhythm of Love" (audio only)
- "Tease Me Please Me" (audio only)
- "Is There Anybody There?" (audio only)

=== VHS / DVD ===
1. "Loving You Sunday Morning" – 5:24 (from Lovedrive)
2. "Is There Anybody There" – 4:39 (from Lovedrive)
3. "The Zoo" – 7:15 (from Animal Magnetism)
4. "Always Somewhere" – 5:26 (from Lovedrive)
5. "Life Is Too Short" – 6:32
6. "Holiday" – 6:02 (from Lovedrive)
7. "You and I" – 5:23 (from Pure Instinct)
8. "When Love Kills Love" – 5:10
9. "Tease Me Please Me" – 5:21 (from Crazy World)
10. "Dust in the Wind" – 4:01 (Kansas cover, from Point of Know Return)
11. "Send Me an Angel" – 5:55 (from Crazy World)
12. "Under the Same Sun" – 5:25 (from Face the Heat)
13. "Rhythm of Love" – 5:22 (from Savage Amusement)
14. "Back to You" – 4:57
15. "Catch Your Train" – 3:50 (from Virgin Killer)
16. "I Wanted to Cry (But the Tears Wouldn't Come)" – 4:07
17. "Hurricane 2001" – 4:39 (from Love at First Sting. Reversion of "Rock You Like a Hurricane)
18. "Wind of Change" – 6:56 (from Crazy World)
19. "Love of My Life" – 3:00 (Queen cover, from the A Night at the Opera)
20. "Drive" – 4:10 (The Cars cover, from Heartbeat City)
21. "Still Loving You" – 5:45 (from Love at First Sting)

== Personnel ==
Scorpions

- Klaus Meine – lead vocals
- Rudolf Schenker – acoustic guitar
- Matthias Jabs – acoustic guitar, 12-string acoustic guitar
- Ralph Rieckermann – bass, contrabass
- James Kottak – drums, backing vocals

Additional musicians

- Christian Kolonovits – piano and Hammond organ
- Johan Daansen – acoustic guitar
- Mario Argandoña – percussion
- Ariana Arcu – cello
- Hille Bemelmanns, Liv Van Aelst, Kristel Van Craen − backing vocals

== Charts ==
Chart (2001)	Peak position
European Albums (IFPI)	27
French Albums (SNEP)	46
German Albums (Offizielle Top 100)	13
Greek Albums (IFPI)	5
Italian Music DVD (FIMI)	18
Portuguese Albums (AFP)	1
Swiss Albums (Schweizer Hitparade)	35

== Sale and certifications ==
=== Album ===
Region	Certification	Certified units/sales
Brazil (Pro-Música Brasil)	Gold	50,000^{*}
Germany (BVMI)	Gold	150,000^{‡}
Indonesia	—	50,000
Malaysia	—	25,000
Portugal (AFP)	Platinum	40,000^{^}
Singapore	—	5,000
South Korea	—	27,376
Thailand	2× Platinum	80,000
^{*} Sales figures based on certification alone.^{^} Shipments figures based on certification alone.^{‡} Sales+streaming figures based on certification alone.

=== Video ===
Region	Certification	Certified units/sales
Argentina (CAPIF)	Platinum	8,000^{^}
Brazil (Pro-Música Brasil)	Platinum	50,000^{*}
Portugal (AFP)	2× Platinum	16,000^{^}
^{*} Sales figures based on certification alone.^{^} Shipments figures based on certification alone.
