= Best of Rockers 'n' Ballads =

Compilation album by Scorpions
- Released: November 29, 1989
- Recorded: 1978–1989
- Genres: Heavy metal; glam metal; hard rock
- Length: 61:28 (Europe) / 55:08 (US)
- Labels: EMI (Europe); Mercury (US)
- Producers: Dieter Dierks, except "I Can't Explain" by Bruce Fairbairn

Scorpions compilations chronology
Gold Ballads (1985)	Best of Rockers 'n' Ballads (1989)	Hot & Slow: The Best of the Ballads (1991)

Singles from Best of Rockers 'n' Ballads
- 1. "I Can't Explain" Released: October 1989; 2. "Holiday" Released: 1989

The Essential Scorpions cover

Professional ratings
Review scores
Source	Rating
AllMusic	4.5/5 stars
AllMusic	(The Essential Scorpions)

Best of Rockers 'n' Ballads is a compilation album by the German hard rock band Scorpions, released in 1989. All songs on this album are from their tenure with Mercury Records, from 1979 to 1988, in addition to rare or never-before released material.

== Background ==
The record was released with different track listings in different regions: At all the compilation features several rare or completely unreleased tracks: There are remixes of "Big City Nights", "Lovedrive", "Holiday" and "Is There Anybody There", which were previously unreleased. Also included are two different versions of "Hey You". While the European pressing features a previously unreleased remix of the song, the US and Japanese editions are the only ones featuring the original version, which was released in 1980 as a single. Another rarity was a cover of The Who's "I Can't Explain", which was also included on that same year's Stairway to Heaven/Highway to Hell charity compilation album. The European CD edition also includes one more rarity: the version of "China White", which features a different solo, a solo that was just released on US editions of Blackout before.

The track listing and individual running times differ between the US, European and Asian editions. While the European pressing features 14 or 15 tracks, the original version of "Hey You" is missing and replaced by a remix. The US and Japanese version just feature twelve tracks and omit the re-recorded version of "Is There Anybody There?" as well as "Another Piece of Meat" and "China White", but it includes the longer, original version of "Hey You". The European edition was re-released with the title The Essential Scorpions in 2003.

Best of Rockers 'n' Ballads reached platinum status in the United States, and is the Scorpions' only compilation album to be certified at least gold by the RIAA there.

== Track listing ==
All music is composed by Rudolf Schenker, except "I Can't Explain" by Pete Townshend, "Another Piece of Meat" by Herman Rarebell and Schenker.

European edition
No.	Title	Lyrics	From the album	Length
1.	"Rock You Like a Hurricane"	Klaus Meine, Rarebell	Love at First Sting, 1984	4:10
2.	"I Can't Explain"	Townshend	Stairway to Heaven/Highway to Hell, 1989	3:19
3.	"Rhythm of Love"	Meine	Savage Amusement, 1988	3:47
4.	"Big City Nights" (Remix)	Meine	Previously unreleased (Original version from Love at First Sting)	3:52
5.	"Lovedrive"	Meine	Lovedrive, 1979	4:50
6.	"Is There Anybody There?" (Remix)	Meine, Rarebell	Previously unreleased (Original version from Lovedrive)	4:16
7.	"Holiday" (Remix)	Meine	Previously unreleased (Original version from Lovedrive)	6:50
8.	"Still Loving You"	Meine	Love at First Sting	6:25
9.	"No One Like You"	Meine	Blackout, 1982	3:54
10.	"Blackout"	Meine, Rarebell, Sonja Kittelsen	Blackout	3:49
11.	"Another Piece of Meat"	Rarebell	Lovedrive	3:21
12.	"You Give Me All I Need"	Rarebell	Blackout	3:37
13.	"Hey You" (Remix)	Meine, Rarebell	Previously unreleased (Original version from the "Hey You" single, 1980)	3:43
14.	"The Zoo"	Meine	Animal Magnetism, 1980	5:29
15.	"China White" (US-solo version, CD bonus track)	Meine	Blackout	6:56

US and Japanese edition
No.	Title	From the album	Length
1.	"Rock You Like a Hurricane"	Love at First Sting	4:12
2.	"I Can't Explain"	Stairway to Heaven/Highway to Hell	3:22
3.	"Still Loving You"	Love at First Sting	6:27
4.	"Big City Nights"	Love at First Sting	4:09
5.	"Lovedrive" (Remix)	Previously unreleased (Original version from Lovedrive)	4:51
6.	"Holiday" (Remix)	Previously unreleased (Original version from Lovedrive)	6:48
7.	"Blackout"	Blackout	3:45
8.	"Rhythm of Love"	Savage Amusement	3:49
9.	"No One Like You"	Blackout	3:55
10.	"You Give Me All I Need"	Blackout	3:40
11.	"Hey You"	Non-album single	4:29
12.	"The Zoo"	Animal Magnetism	5:28

== Charts ==
Chart (1989)	Peak position
Dutch Albums (Album Top 100)	92
Finnish Albums (The Official Finnish Charts)	12
German Albums (Offizielle Top 100)	14
Swedish Albums (Sverigetopplistan)	35
Swiss Albums (Schweizer Hitparade)	21
US Billboard 200	43

== Sales and certifications ==
Region	Certification	Certified units/sales
Canada (Music Canada)	Gold	50,000^{^}
Finland (Musiikkituottajat)	Gold	25,000
Germany (BVMI)	Gold	250,000^{^}
Switzerland (IFPI Switzerland)	Gold	25,000^{^}
United States (RIAA)	Platinum	1,000,000^{^}
^{^} Shipments figures based on certification alone.
