= World Wide Live =

1985 double live album by Scorpions

Live album by Scorpions
- Released: June 14, 1985
- Recorded: Love at First Sting World Tour; 23 January 1984 – 7 February 1985
- Genres: Hard rock, heavy metal
- Length: 77:27
- Labels: Harvest/EMI (Europe); Mercury (US)
- Producer: Dieter Dierks

Scorpions live albums chronology
Tokyo Tapes (1978)	World Wide Live (1985)	Live Bites (1995)

Singles from World Wide Live
- 1. "Big City Nights" Released: June 1985

World Wide Live

Video by Scorpions
- Released: 1985
- Recorded: 1984–1985 World Tour
- Length: 60 min.
- Label: PMI / Castle
- Director: Hart Perry
- Producers: Marty Callner, Hart Perry

Scorpions video albums chronology
World Wide Live (1985)	To Russia with Love and Other Savage Amusements (1988)

Professional ratings
Review scores
Source	Rating
AllMusic	4/5 stars
Collector's Guide to Heavy Metal	6/10
Rolling Stone	(mixed)

World Wide Live is a live album by German rock band Scorpions, released in 1985. The original audio recording was produced by Dieter Dierks. A VHS was released at the same time with footage of Scorpions' world tour.

The live album was originally released as a 2LP vinyl set, in a gatefold-sleeve, and a cassette. The liner notes contain a crew member list, tour date information and when the shows were recorded:

- Bercy, Paris, France (1984-02-29)
- The Forum, Los Angeles, CA, USA (1984-04-24 & 1984-04-25)
- Sports Arena, San Diego, CA, USA (1984-04-26)
- Pacific Amphitheatre, Costa Mesa, CA, USA (1984-04-28)
- Sporthalle, Cologne, West Germany (1984-11-17)

The initial CD release featured 15 tracks (dropping "Another Piece of Meat", "Six-String Sting" and "Can't Get Enough", parts 1 and 2, due to time constraints), but the remastered edition of 1997 features the original album in full.

A 50th anniversary boxset was released in 2018 with remastered album on 2-CD and also a DVD.

== Track listing ==
=== Audio ===
Side one

1. "Countdown" (Klaus Meine, Matthias Jabs) - 0:41
2. "Coming Home" (Rudolf Schenker, Meine) - 3:17 (original studio version appears on Love at First Sting, 1984)
3. "Blackout" (Schenker, Meine, Herman Rarebell, Sonja Kittelsen) - 4:11 (original studio version appears on Blackout, 1982)
4. "Bad Boys Running Wild" (Schenker, Meine, Rarebell) - 3:45 (original studio version appears on Love at First Sting)
5. "Loving You Sunday Morning" (Schenker, Meine, Rarebell) - 4:41 (original studio version appears on Lovedrive, 1979)
6. "Make It Real" (Schenker, Rarebell) - 3:51 (original studio version appears on Animal Magnetism, 1980)

Side two

7. "Big City Nights" (Schenker, Meine) – 4:49 (original studio version appears on Love at First Sting)
8. "Coast to Coast" (Schenker) – 4:40 (original studio version appears on Lovedrive)
9. "Holiday" (Schenker, Meine) – 3:12 (original studio version appears on Lovedrive)
10. "Still Loving You" (Schenker, Meine) – 5:44 (original studio version appears on Love at First Sting)

Side three

1. "Rock You Like a Hurricane" (Schenker, Meine, Rarebell) – 4:04 (original studio version appears on Love at First Sting)
2. "Can't Live Without You" (Schenker, Meine) – 5:28 (original studio version appears on Blackout)
3. "Another Piece of Meat" (Schenker, Rarebell) – 5:36 (original studio version appears on Lovedrive)
4. "Dynamite" (Schenker, Meine, Rarebell) – 7:05 (original studio version appears on Blackout)

Side four

5. "The Zoo" (Schenker, Meine) – 5:46 (original studio version appears on Animal Magnetism)
6. "No One Like You" (Schenker, Meine) – 4:07 (original studio version appears on Blackout)
7. "Can't Get Enough", Pt. 1 (Schenker, Meine) – 1:59 (original studio version appears on Lovedrive)
8. "Six String Sting" (Matthias Jabs guitar solo) – 5:18
9. "Can't Get Enough", Pt. 2 (Schenker, Meine) – 1:52 (original studio version appears on Lovedrive)

=== Video ===
1. "Coming Home"
2. "Blackout"
3. "Big City Nights"
4. "Loving You Sunday Morning"
5. "No One Like You"
6. "Holiday"
7. "Bad Boys Running Wild"
8. "Still Loving You"
9. "Rock You Like a Hurricane"
10. "Dynamite"
11. "I'm Leaving You" (Studio version which plays over credits)

== Personnel ==
Scorpions

- Klaus Meine – lead vocals, rhythm guitar on "Coast to Coast"
- Rudolf Schenker – rhythm guitars, lead guitars on "Big City Nights", "Coast To Coast", "Holiday" and "Still Loving You", backing vocals
- Matthias Jabs – lead guitars, rhythm guitars on "Big City Nights", "Coast To Coast", "Holiday" and "Still Loving You", talk box on "The Zoo", backing vocals
- Francis Buchholz – bass, backing vocals
- Herman Rarebell – drums, backing vocals

Production

- Dieter Dierks – producer, audio mixing
- Mike Beiriger – engineer, mixing
- David Hewitt – engineer
- Gerd Rautenbach – engineer

== Charts ==
Chart (1985)	Peak position
Austrian Albums (Ö3 Austria)	4
Canada Top Albums/CDs (RPM)	39
Dutch Albums (Album Top 100)	47
Finnish Albums (The Official Finnish Charts)	9
French Albums (SNEP)	20
German Albums (Offizielle Top 100)	4
Japanese Albums (Oricon)	43
Swedish Albums (Sverigetopplistan)	9
Swiss Albums (Schweizer Hitparade)	18
UK Albums (Official Charts)	18
US Billboard 200	14

== Certifications ==
Region	Certification	Certified units/sales
Canada (Music Canada)	Platinum	100,000^{^}
France (SNEP)	Gold	100,000^{*}
Germany (BVMI)	Gold	250,000^{^}
Spain (Promusicae)	Platinum	100,000^{^}
United States (RIAA) audio release	Platinum	1,000,000^{^}
United States (RIAA) vhs release	Gold	50,000^{^}
^{*} Sales figures based on certification alone.^{^} Shipments figures based on certification alone.
