= Best of Scorpions Vol. 2 =

Compilation album by Scorpions
- Released: July 10, 1984
- Recorded: 1974–1978
- Genre: Heavy metal, hard rock
- Length: 41:58
- Label: RCA Records
- Producer: Dieter Dierks and Scorpions

Scorpions compilations chronology
Hot & Heavy (1982)	Best of Scorpions Vol. 2 (1984)	Gold Ballads (1985)

Professional ratings
Review scores
Source	Rating
Allmusic	4.5/5 stars
Kerrang!	(reissue)

Best of Scorpions Vol. 2 is a compilation album of songs by the German heavy metal band Scorpions, released on July 10, 1984 in the United States.

== Track listing ==
1. "Top of the Bill" - 3:22 (from the album In Trance)
2. "They Need a Million" - 4:47 (from the album Fly to the Rainbow)
3. "Longing for Fire" - 2:42 (from the album In Trance)
4. "Catch Your Train" - 3:32 (from the album Virgin Killer)
5. "Speedy's Coming" (live) - 3:21 (from the album Tokyo Tapes)
6. "Crying Days" - 4:36 (from the album Virgin Killer)
7. "All Night Long" (live) - 2:55 (from the album Tokyo Tapes)
8. "This Is My Song" - 4:07 (from the album Fly to the Rainbow)
9. "Sun in My Hand" - 4:20 (from the album In Trance)
10. "We'll Burn the Sky" (live) - 8:16 (from the album Tokyo Tapes)

== Charts ==
Chart (1984)	Peak position
US Billboard 200	175
