= Still Lovin' You =

Still Lovin' You or Still Loving You may refer to:

- "Still Lovin' You", a song by Stephanie Mills from the album Tantalizingly Hot, 1982
- "Still Lovin' You", a 2014 song by Namie Amuro
- Still Lovin' You, a 2003 album by Robert Bradley's Blackwater Surprise
- "Still Loving You", a song by Scorpions from the album Love at First Sting, 1984
- Still Loving You (album), a 1992 compilation album by Scorpions
