= Francis Buchholz =

German bass guitarist (1950–2026)

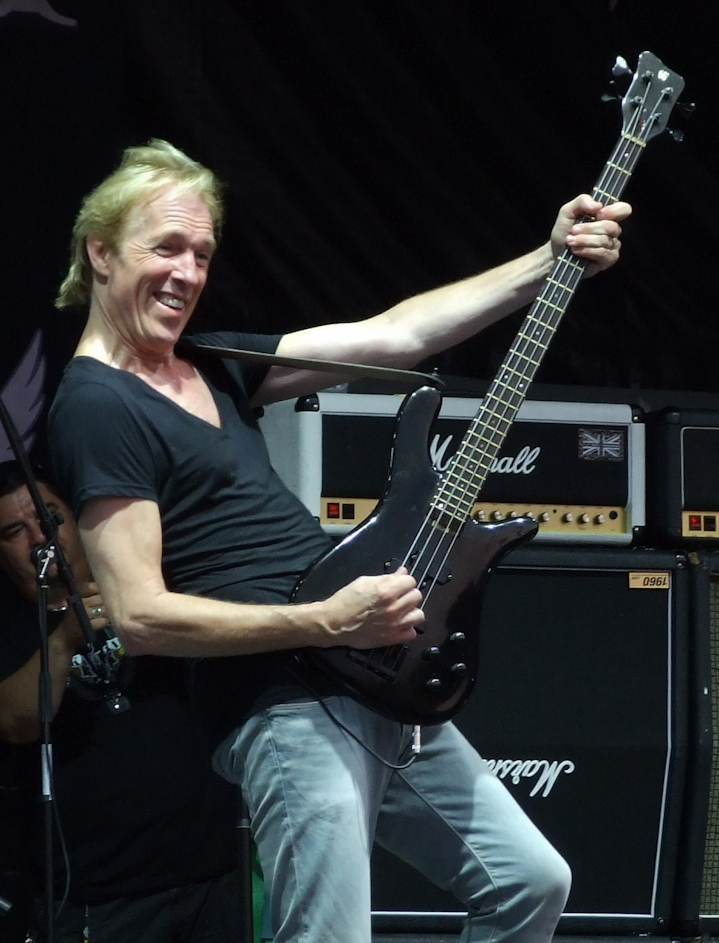
- Buchholz performing in 2012

Background information
- Born: 19 February 1954; Hanover, Lower Saxony, Germany
- Died: 22 January 2026 (aged 71)
- Genres: Hard rock; heavy metal
- Occupation: Bassist
- Years active: 1965–2026
- Formerly of: Scorpions; Dawn Road; Dreamtide; Michael Schenker's Temple of Rock; Phantom V

Francis Buchholz (19 February 1954 – 22 January 2026) was a German musician best known as the bass guitarist of the German rock band Scorpions from 1973 until 1992, a group that was successful internationally; his bass riffs for hits such as "Rock You Like a Hurricane" and "Wind of Change" were regarded as iconic. After leaving Scorpions, he was a member of Michael Schenker's Temple of Rock, among others.

== Early life and career ==
Born in Hanover on 19 February 1954, Buchholz discovered rock music at the age of 11. His first public appearance as a bass player was at age 15, with a school band, Blue Carps. From then on he played in different rock, blues and jazz bands in his hometown. While studying mechanical engineering at the TU Hannover and taking jazz classes at the Musikhochschule Hannover, Buchholz joined the band Dawn Road, whose lineup included vocalist and guitarist Uli Roth, drummer Jürgen Rosenthal and Achim Kirschning on keyboards. Eventually they and the two members who first formed Scorpions, singer Klaus Meine and guitarist Rudolf Schenker, merged into a new incarnation of the Scorpions in 1973, with Buchholz on bass. Buchholz's first recording with the Scorpions was 1974's Fly to the Rainbow, and he stayed as a band member for 18 years, recording 12 albums during the band's most commercially successful period. His bass riffs for hit songs such as "Rock You Like a Hurricane", "Wind of Change", "Big City Nights", "Still Loving You", "No One Like You", and others were regarded as iconic. In 1988, Scorpions were the first metal band to tour the Soviet Union. They returned the following year for the Moscow Music Peace Festival, where other bands included Bon Jovi and the Ozzy Osbourne Band. "Wind of Change" was written in the spirit of perestroika and also appeared in Russian. Scorpions sold over 15 million records in the US and over 100 million records worldwide. For his success with the Scorpions, Buchholz was awarded with over 50 gold and platinum awards for record sales all over the world.

Buchholz and the band separated after disagreement over band management in 1992. His last album with the Scorpions was Crazy World, which also contained the only Scorpions track Buchholz contributed to writing, "Kicks After Six". His final appearance on a Scorpions project, which was in the form of archived concert recordings, would be for their 1995 album Live Bites, which involved concert recordings dating back to 1988. Though the Scorpions would not disband, Buchholz's departure is acknowledged to have marked the end of the band's peak era, with the Las Vegas Sun stating in 1994 that "In the Garden of Eden time is running out. The party is over."

Buchholz reunited with Uli Roth for a tour of Europe and the United States in 2005 and 2006. In 2008 Buchholz worked with the band Dreamtide as their bass player and co-producer for the album Dream And Deliver.

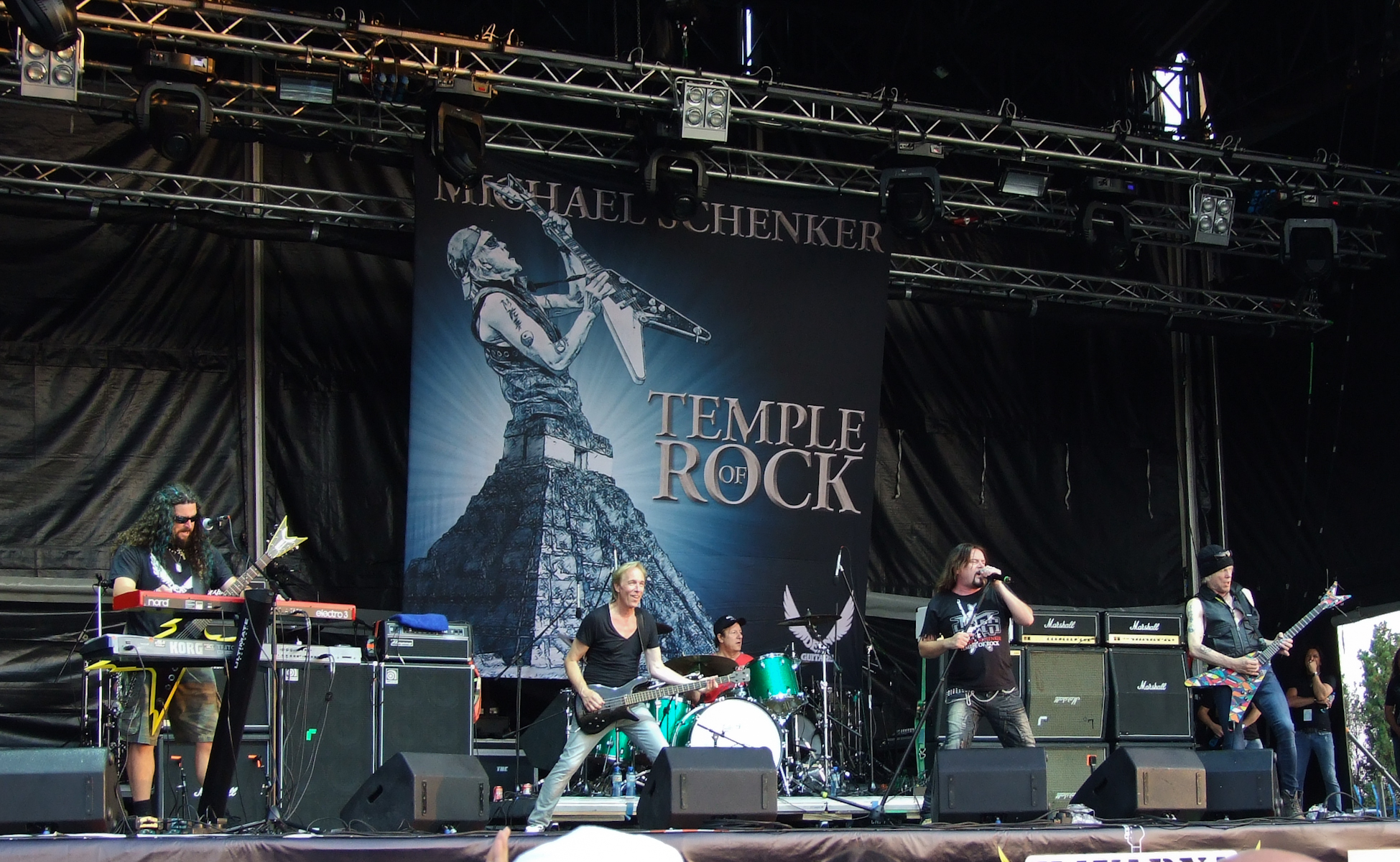
(from l.) Wayne Findlay, Buchholz, Herman Rarebell, Doogie White and Schenker, 2012

From 2012 to 2016, Buchholz toured with former Scorpions lead guitarist Michael Schenker with his Temple of Rock formation, first for the European dates of his "Temple of Rock – Lovedrive Reunion Tour" alongside former Scorpions drummer Herman Rarebell, with ex-Rainbow Doogie White (vocals) and MSG's Wayne Findley (guitars and keys).

Temple of Rock's next album Bridge the Gap featured Buchholz on bass and was released in November 2013. A European tour in 2013 was followed by concerts in Mexico and South America and in 2014 they toured Japan and Europe. Their new album Spirit On A Mission was released in 2015 and the band toured US, Japan and Europe. Early in 2016 they played more shows in UK and Scandinavia.

== Personal life ==
In 1978, Buchholz founded a PA and stage lighting rental company, Rocksound, in Germany. The company began as a way to distribute special exponential loudspeaker cabinets Buchholz had developed, but also to provide employment for the Scorpions' roadies when not on tour.

Buchholz lived in Hannover with his wife Hella; they had a son and twin daughters. In 1996, Buchholz authored the book Bass Magic; he also worked as a record producer and consultant.

Buchholz died from cancer on 22 January 2026, at the age of 71.

== Discography ==
Recordings with Buchholz include:

=== With Scorpions ===
- 1974: Fly to the Rainbow
- 1975: In Trance
- 1976: Virgin Killer
- 1977: Taken by Force
- 1978: Tokyo Tapes (live)
- 1979: Lovedrive
- 1980: Animal Magnetism
- 1982: Blackout
- 1984: Love at First Sting
- 1985: World Wide Live (live)
- 1988: Savage Amusement
- 1990: Crazy World

=== With Dreamtide ===
- 2008: Dream and Deliver

=== With Michael Schenker's Temple of Rock ===
- 2012: Live in Europe (DVD, bonus DVD, Blu-Ray and double-CD)
- 2013: Bridge the Gap
- 2015: Spirit on a Mission
- 2016: On a Mission – Live in Madrid (DVD, double-Blu-Ray and double-CD)

=== With Phantom 5 ===
- 2016: Phantom 5 (CD)
- 2017: Play II Win (CD, vinyl)
