= Live Bites =

Live album by Scorpions
- Released: 3 April 1995
- Recorded: Live tours from 1988 to 1994
- Studio: Goodnight LA Studios, Los Angeles, California, Wisseloord Studios, Hilversum, The Netherlands; Scorpio Sound Studio, Hannover, Germany (studio tracks)
- Genre: Heavy metal, hard rock
- Length: 66:39 (international), 63:21 (US)
- Label: Mercury/PolyGram
- Producer: Scorpions (live tracks and "Edge of Time"); Keith Olsen & Scorpions (other studio tracks)

Scorpions live albums chronology
World Wide Live (1985)	Live Bites (1995)	Acoustica (2001)

Singles from Live Bites
- 1. "White Dove" / "Ave Maria No Morro" Released: 1994; 2. "Edge of Time" / "No One Like You" Released: 1995; 3. "In Trance (live)" Released: 1995

Professional ratings
Review scores
Source	Rating
AllMusic	2/5 stars
Collector's Guide to Heavy Metal	4/10
Metal Hammer (GER)	5/7
Rock Hard	8.5/10

Live Bites is a live album by the German hard rock band Scorpions, released on 3 April 1995.

It was recorded between 1988 and 1994 in Leningrad (Russia), San Francisco (US), Mexico City (Mexico), Berlin (Germany) and Munich (Germany).

== Track listing ==
=== International version ===
No.	Title	Lyrics	Music	Recorded	Length
1.	"Tease Me Please Me"	Klaus Meine, Herman Rarebell, Jim Vallance	Matthias Jabs, Vallance	live in Mexico City	4:52
2.	"Is There Anybody There?"	Meine, Rarebell	Rudolf Schenker	live in Mexico City	4:08
3.	"Rhythm of Love"	Meine	Schenker	live in Berlin	3:45
4.	"In Trance"	Meine	Schenker	live in Mexico City	4:06
5.	"No Pain No Gain"	Meine, Mark Hudson	Schenker	live in Mexico City	4:06
6.	"When the Smoke Is Going Down"	Meine	Schenker	live in Mexico City	2:37
7.	"Ave Maria No Morro"	Herivelto Martins, Manuel Salinas	Martins, Salinas	live in Mexico City	3:15
8.	"Living for Tomorrow"	Meine	Schenker	live in Leningrad	6:55
9.	"Concerto in V" (instrumental)		Schenker	live in Berlin or San Francisco	3:00
10.	"Alien Nation"	Meine	Schenker	live in Mexico City	5:29
11.	"Hit Between the Eyes"	Rarebell, Meine, Vallance	Schenker	live in Mexico City	4:08
12.	"Crazy World"	Meine, Schenker, Rarebell, Vallance	Schenker	live in San Francisco	5:33
13.	"Wind of Change"	Meine	Meine	live in Munich	5:46
14.	"Heroes Don't Cry"	Meine	Schenker	new studio track	4:32
15.	"White Dove" (cover of Omega song "Gyöngyhajú lány")	Gábor Presser, Schenker, Meine	Anna Adamis, Schenker, Meine	new studio track	4:18

=== US version ===
No.	Title	Lyrics	Music	Recorded	Length
1.	"Tease Me Please Me"			live in Mexico City	4:51
2.	"Is There Anybody There?"			live in Mexico City	4:08
3.	"Rhythm of Love"			live in Berlin	3:45
4.	"In Trance"			live in Mexico City	4:06
5.	"No Pain No Gain"			live in Mexico City	4:06
6.	"When the Smoke Is Going Down"			live in Mexico City	2:36
7.	"Living for Tomorrow"			live In Leningrad	6:55
8.	"Concerto in V" (instrumental)			live in Berlin or San Francisco	3:00
9.	"Alien Nation"			live in Mexico City	5:28
10.	"Crazy World"			live in San Francisco	5:33
11.	"Wind of Change"			live in Munich	5:46
12.	"Edge of Time" (US edition bonus track)	Meine	Schenker	new studio track	4:07
13.	"Heroes Don't Cry"			new studio track	4:32
14.	"White Dove" (cover of Omega song "Gyöngyhajú lány")	Gábor Presser, Schenker, Meine	Anna Adamis, Schenker, Meine	new studio track	4:19

== Personnel ==
Scorpions

- Klaus Meine – lead vocals
- Rudolf Schenker – rhythm guitar, lead guitar, 6 & 12-string acoustic guitars, backing vocals
- Matthias Jabs – lead guitar, rhythm guitar, 6 & 12-string acoustic guitars, backing vocals
- Herman Rarebell – drums, keyboards on "Concerto in V"
- Ralph Rieckermann – bass, upright bass, backing vocals
- Francis Buchholz – bass on "Rhythm of Love", "Living for Tomorrow", and "Crazy World"

Studio session musicians

- Luke Herzog – keyboards on "Edge of Time"
- Richard Baker – orchestration programming on "Heroes Don't Cry"
- Fred White, Linda McCrary, Alfie Silas, Ricky Nelson – choir on "Heroes Don't Cry"
- Kinderchor Majell Lustenhouwer – children's choir on "White Dove"
- Rocq-E Harrel – additional vocals on "White Dove"

Production

- Keith Olsen – producer ("Heroes Don't Cry" and "White Dove")
- Erwin Musper – engineer, mixing
- Sander van der Heide – mastering

== Charts ==
Chart (1985)	Peak position
German Albums (Offizielle Top 100)	66
UK Rock & Metal Albums (OCC)	29
