= No One Like You =

Single by Scorpions

from the album Blackout
- A-side: "Now!' (Japan)
- B-side: "Now!" (worldwide)
- Released: March 1982; June 1982 (US)
- Recorded: 1981
- Studio: Dierks Studios, Stommeln, West Germany
- Genre: Hard rock; heavy metal; glam metal
- Length: 3:57
- Label: Harvest; Mercury
- Composer: Rudolf Schenker
- Lyricist: Klaus Meine
- Producer: Dieter Dierks

Scorpions singles chronology
| "Make It Real" (1980) | "No One Like You" (1982) | "Can't Live Without You" (1982) |

Music video
- "No One Like You" on YouTube

"No One Like You" is a 1982 song by German rock band Scorpions. It was written by band members Rudolf Schenker (guitar) and Klaus Meine (vocals) and released as the lead single from the band's eighth studio album Blackout (1982). It was produced by Dieter Dierks and was recorded at Dierks Studios.

== Background ==
"No One Like You" first appeared on the band's 1982 album Blackout. It was one of three hit singles from the record. The track also appeared on multiple greatest hits-type albums including: Best of Rockers 'n' Ballads, Bad for Good: The Very Best of Scorpions, and Box of Scorpions.

A video was shot for the song in San Francisco. It features Alcatraz Island—with Klaus Meine being the recipient of capital punishment.

The track was originally written in German and much of its meaning changed in translation.

== Reception ==
The song reached number 65 on the Billboard Hot 100 singles chart. It also attained the number 1 position on the US Billboard Rock Tracks chart. The track peaked at number 49 in Canada.

Scorpions released a live version as a taster for their forthcoming live album World Wide Live in 1984, along with their second hit "Big City Nights". The record's flipside also features a performance of their classic "The Zoo".

== Personnel ==
- Klaus Meine – vocals
- Rudolf Schenker – rhythm guitar
- Matthias Jabs – lead guitar
- Francis Buchholz – bass
- Herman Rarebell – drums
- Dieter Dierks – producer

== Charts ==
| Chart (1982) | Peak position |
|---|---|
| Canada Top Singles (RPM) | 49 |
| UK Singles (Official Charts) | 64 |
| US Billboard Hot 100 | 65 |
| US Mainstream Rock (Billboard) | 1 |

| Chart (1985) | Peak position |
|---|---|
| French Singles (IFOP) | 69 |
| West Germany (GfK) | 40 |

== See also ==
- List of Billboard Mainstream Rock number-one songs of the 1980s
