= Big City Nights (song) =

Single by Scorpions

from the album Love at First Sting
- Released: 13 August 1984
- Recorded: 1983
- Genre: Hard rock; arena rock
- Length: 4:08; 3:56 (single remix)
- Label: Harvest/EMI
- Songwriters: Rudolf Schenker; Klaus Meine
- Producer: Dieter Dierks

Scorpions singles chronology
"Still Loving You" (1984)	"Big City Nights" (1984)	"Coming Home" (1984)

Music video
- "Scorpions - Big City Nights (Official Video)" on YouTube

"Big City Nights" is a song by German metal band Scorpions. The song was released as the sixth track of their 1984 album Love at First Sting. Like many Scorpions songs, "Big City Nights" was composed by band members Rudolf Schenker and Klaus Meine. The song was also released as the third single from the album in 1984, with the B-side being "Bad Boys Running Wild". The guitar solo is performed by Rudolf Schenker.

The band created a music video for the song. The video is a live version of the song taken from concert footage of their 1984 Love at First Sting world tour. A different version can be seen on their World Wide Live concert documentary home video released in 1985.

== Personnel ==
Personnel taken from Love at First Sting liner notes.

- Klaus Meine – lead and backing vocals
- Rudolf Schenker – lead guitar
- Matthias Jabs – rhythm guitar
- Francis Buchholz – bass, Moog Taurus
- Herman Rarebell – drums

== Charts ==
Chart (1984)	Peak position
UK Singles (OCC)	76
US Mainstream Rock (Billboard)	14
