= Tokyo Tapes (album) =

Live album by Scorpions
- Released: 15 August 1978
- Recorded: 24 & 27 April 1978
- Venues: Nakano Sun Plaza, Tokyo, Japan
- Genres: Hard rock, heavy metal
- Length: 85:07
- Label: RCA Records
- Producer: Dieter Dierks

Scorpions live albums chronology
| Tokyo Tapes (1978) | World Wide Live (1985) |

Original 1978 cover (Japan only)

Professional ratings
Review scores
| Source | Rating |
|---|---|
| AllMusic | 3/5 stars |

Tokyo Tapes is the first live album by German rock band Scorpions and their last release by RCA Records. It was also the final release to feature Uli Jon Roth, who left after the 27 April taping session.

== Overview ==
Tokyo Tapes includes songs from all Scorpions' albums released before 1978, which were recorded at Nakano Sun Plaza (Tokyo's Nakano Ward, Japan) on 24 and 27 April, during the band's Japanese tour in 1978. These shows were guitarist Uli Jon Roth's last performances with the band, who had announced his departure after the release in December 1977 of the studio album Taken by Force.

The live album was originally released on 15 August 1978 in Japan only, with a cover artwork of an embossed platinum scorpion set on a rose, as opposed to a live shot of the band when it was eventually released in Europe in December 1978. It was released in the US in January 1979.

During these two shows (which share the same setlist), the songs "Hell-Cat", "Catch Your Train" and the Japanese national anthem "Kimi ga yo" were also performed but were not included in the official album. At each show, "Catch Your Train" was chronologically played between "Speedy's Coming" and "Top of the Bill" while "Kimi ga yo" was played as the penultimate track and "Hell-Cat" as the final track.

On the 2001 EMI re-mastered CD, "Polar Nights" was omitted so as to fit a single CD, although it was included on the re-mastered version of Taken by Force. The earlier (1984) two-CD release, however, is the original album in its entirety.

Roth commented about the recording of the album:

Tokyo Tapes was a peak time, we have played together for all these years and it all came together at that time. Particularly on the first show, which unfortunately wasn't recorded. There were three shows in Tokyo, the first one was by far the best, but the second one was good too. Those are the ones on the album, the second and the third that were used. The first one I thought was a lot better and I was disappointed that it wasn't recorded.

In 2015, as part of Scorpions' 50th Anniversary, Tokyo Tapes was remastered and re-released as a double-disc special edition, with all omitted songs ("Polar Nights" and the three excluded songs) restored and including alternate version of several songs originally found on the album. Due to time constraints on Disc 1, "Robot Man", the last track of the original release, was shifted to the beginning of Disc 2 which, otherwise, contains the bonus tracks.

== Track listing ==
All lyrics are written by Klaus Meine, except where noted; all music is composed by Rudolf Schenker, except where noted.

Side one
| No. | Title | Writer(s) | Length |
|---|---|---|---|
| 1. | "All Night Long" | Ulrich Roth, Meine | 3:44 |
| 2. | "Pictured Life" | Lyrics: Meine, Roth | 3:12 |
| 3. | "Backstage Queen" | | 3:44 |
| 4. | "Polar Nights" (omitted from single-disc releases) | Roth | 6:43 |
| 5. | "In Trance" | | 5:25 |

Side two
| No. | Title | Writer(s) | Length |
|---|---|---|---|
| 6. | "We'll Burn the Sky" | Lyrics: Monika Dannemann | 8:07 |
| 7. | "Suspender Love" | | 3:38 |
| 8. | "In Search of the Peace of Mind" | Michael Schenker, R. Schenker, Meine, Wolfgang Dziony, Lothar Heimberg | 3:02 |
| 9. | "Fly to the Rainbow" | M. Schenker, Roth | 9:39 |

Side three
| No. | Title | Writer(s) | Length |
|---|---|---|---|
| 10. | "He's a Woman, She's a Man" | Lyrics: Meine, Herman Rarebell | 5:22 |
| 11. | "Speedy's Coming" | | 3:40 |
| 12. | "Top of the Bill" | | 6:45 |
| 13. | "Hound Dog" | Jerry Leiber and Mike Stoller | 1:14 |
| 14. | "Long Tall Sally" | Enotris Johnson, Robert Blackwell, Richard Penniman | 2:50 |

Side four
| No. | Title | Writer(s) | Length |
|---|---|---|---|
| 15. | "Steamrock Fever" | | 3:41 |
| 16. | "Dark Lady" | Roth | 4:18 |
| 17. | "Kōjō no Tsuki" | Lyrics: Bansui Doi / Music: Rentarō Taki, arranged by Scorpions | 3:35 |
| 18. | "Robot Man" (first track on disc 2 of the 2015 50th Anniversary 2-CD release) | | 5:47 |

2015 remastered edition bonus tracks
| No. | Title | Writer(s) | Length |
|---|---|---|---|
| 19. | "Hell Cat" (recorded 27 April 1978) | Roth | 9:47 |
| 20. | "Catch Your Train" (recorded 27 April 1978) | | 3:52 |
| 21. | "Kimi ga yo" (Japanese National Anthem, recorded 24 April 1978) | Yoshiisa Oku, Akimori Hayashi, Franz Eckert, arranged by Scorpions | 1:29 |
| 22. | "Polar Nights" (recorded 24 April 1978) | Roth | 7:32 |
| 23. | "He's a Woman, She's a Man" (recorded 24 April 1978) | Lyrics: Meine, Rarebell | 6:06 |
| 24. | "Top of the Bill" (recorded 24 April 1978) | | 10:48 |
| 25. | "Robot Man" (recorded 27 April 1978) | | 6:49 |

== Personnel ==
Scorpions

- Klaus Meine – vocals
- Ulrich Roth – lead guitar, vocals on "Polar Nights", "Dark Lady", and "Hell Cat", storytelling in "Fly to the Rainbow"
- Rudolf Schenker – rhythm guitar, lead guitar on "He's a Woman, She's a Man" (only intro), guitar solo on "Long Tall Sally"
- Francis Buchholz – bass
- Herman Rarebell – drums

Production

- Dieter Dierks – producer, mixing
- Tamotsu Yoshida – live engineer

== Charts ==
| Chart (1978–1979) | Peak position |
|---|---|
| French Albums (SNEP) | 14 |
| German Albums (Offizielle Top 100) | 35 |
| Japanese Albums (Oricon) | 51 |
| Swedish Albums (Sverigetopplistan) | 42 |

== Certifications ==
| Region | Certification | Certified units/sales |
|---|---|---|
| France (SNEP) | Gold | 100,000^{*} |
^{*} Sales figures based on certification alone.
