= Taken by Force =

Studio album by Scorpions
- Released: December 1977
- Recorded: June–October 1977
- Studios: Dierks Studios, Stommeln, West Germany
- Genres: Hard rock, heavy metal
- Length: 39:05
- Label: RCA Records
- Producer: Dieter Dierks

Scorpions chronology
Virgin Killer (1976)	Taken by Force (1977)	Lovedrive (1979)

Singles from Taken by Force
- 1. "He's a Woman – She's a Man" Released: 1977; 2. "The Sails of Charon" Released: 1978 (Japan)

Alternative cover

Professional ratings
Review scores
Source	Rating
AllMusic	3.5/5 stars

Taken by Force is the fifth studio album by German band Scorpions, released by RCA Records in 1977. It was the band's first album to feature drummer Herman Rarebell and their last studio album to feature guitarist Uli Jon Roth. Roth left in 1978, following the end of the album's tour, and was replaced by Michael Schenker, then by Matthias Jabs.

The lyrics to "We'll Burn the Sky" were initially a poem by Monika Dannemann, the last girlfriend of Jimi Hendrix, and are a tribute to the late guitarist.

"The Sails of Charon" was lauded by Megadeth front man Dave Mustaine: "When I think of the Scorpions, the very first song that always comes to mind is the one that paved the way for me with lead guitar playing, and just the incredible shred factor done with a classical violinist approach on electric guitar by Uli Jon Roth. And that song is the one, the only, 'Sails of Charon'. For any guitar player that was going to the Guitar Institute of Technology, it was almost an unwritten rule that you had to learn the solo for 'Sails of Charon' to be worth your salt." Mustaine also acclaimed 'Steamrock Fever' ("Just full-on plodding metal") and 'He's a Woman – She's a Man' ("I just loved the guitar playing on this… these inexcusable (sic) outbursts of shredding guitar."

== Artwork ==
The cover photography was by Michael von Gimbut; his third Scorpions cover commission. Like its two predecessors, Taken by Force provoked controversy, which again resulted in the artwork being replaced in most markets with photographs of the band members. Guitarist Uli Jon Roth defended the original artwork in a 2008 interview:

I think the original idea was children playing with guns at a military cemetery in France and some people found that offensive. I don't think it's offensive because I think it was actually a quite a good image because it puts war totally into perspective; very often it is young people, eighteen, nineteen, going to war that don't fully understand life. When you're fifteen you don't fully understand life, but these guys then have to shoot other people simply because someone tells them to do it for their country. Politicians are sometimes also children with guns, in all periods of time a lot of politicians are far too trigger happy and war too easily becomes an "easy solution", whereas for me it should never be a solution, there should be no war in the first place. Maybe every once in a while a country may need to defend itself, I understand that, but in general if you consider that there are over a hundred wars raging in the present day on this planet alone then it's just sheer lunacy and always the tool of the Dark Side. Usually bad things come from war, very few good things, but sometimes good things come from bad things, that's true, nothing's that black and white. It's always the wrong solution to kill people.

== Track listing ==
All music composed by Rudolf Schenker except where noted.

Side one
No.	Title	Lyrics	Music	Length
1.	"Steamrock Fever"	Klaus Meine		3:37
2.	"We'll Burn the Sky"	Monika Dannemann		6:26
3.	"I've Got to Be Free"	Ulrich Roth	Roth	4:00
4.	"The Riot of Your Time"	Meine		4:09

Side two
No.	Title	Lyrics	Music	Length
5.	"The Sails of Charon" ( (Note: Most versions feature an edited version of "The Sails of Charon". The editing removes an introduction of wind-like sound effects performed on guitar. Similar sound effects can be heard at the end of the song.))	Roth	Roth	5:16
6.	"Your Light"	Roth	Roth	4:31
7.	"He's a Woman – She's a Man"	Meine, Herman Rarebell		3:15
8.	"Born to Touch Your Feelings" ( (Note: Women's voices are performed by some friends and fans: Junko and Mutsumi from Japan, Esther from Suriname, Rosa from Rome, Susan from L.A., and Leila from Tahiti.))	Meine		7:40

2001 CD reissue bonus tracks
No.	Title	Lyrics	Music	Length
9.	"Suspender Love"	Meine		3:20
10.	"Polar Nights" ( (Note: Live version from Tokyo Tapes))	Roth	Roth	6:56

== Personnel ==
Scorpions

- Klaus Meine – vocals
- Ulrich Roth – lead guitar (rhythm guitar & bass on "Sails of Charon")
- Rudolf Schenker – rhythm guitar (except "Sails of Charon")
- Francis Buchholz – bass guitar (except "Sails of Charon")
- Herman Rarebell – drums, percussion

Production

- Dieter Dierks – producer, engineer, mixing

== Cover versions ==
- "We'll Burn the Sky" was covered by the Japanese metal musician Syu on his cover album Crying Stars -Stand Proud!- in 2010.
- "The Sails of Charon" was covered by the American thrash metal band Testament on their compilation album Signs of Chaos in 1997.
- "The Sails of Charon" was also covered by Yngwie Malmsteen on his 1996 cover album Inspiration
- "He's a Woman – She's a Man" was covered by the German power metal band Helloween on their cover album Metal Jukebox in 1999.
- "He's a Woman – She's a Man" was also covered by American thrash metal band Evildead on their album The Underworld in 1991.
- "He's a Woman – She's a Man" was also covered by the American power metal band Helstar on their 1988 album A Distant Thunder.
- "He's a Woman – She's a Man" was also covered by American thrash metal band Exodus in 2025. The recording features lead vocals by Mark Osegueda of Death Angel.
