= Crazy World (Scorpions album) =

- Cover design by Richard Evans

Studio album by Scorpions
- Released: 6 November 1990
- Recorded: 1990
- Studios: Goodnight LA Studios, Los Angeles, U.S. Wisseloord Studios, Hilversum, Netherlands
- Genres: Hard rock; pop metal
- Length: 52:53
- Labels: Vertigo, Mercury
- Producers: Keith Olsen; Scorpions

Scorpions chronology
Savage Amusement (1988)	Crazy World (1990)	Face the Heat (1993)

Singles from Crazy World
- 1. "Tease Me Please Me" Released: November 1990; 2. "Don't Believe Her" Released: December 1990; 3. "Wind of Change" Released: 21 January 1991; 4. "Send Me an Angel" Released: 17 September 1991

Professional ratings
Review scores
Source	Rating
AllMusic	4.5/5 stars
Classic Rock	6/10 stars
Collector's Guide to Heavy Metal	5/10
Forces Parallèles	4/5 stars
Rock Hard	8.0/10

Crazy World is the eleventh studio album by the German hard rock band Scorpions, released on 6 November 1990. The album peaked at No. 21 on the Billboard 200 chart for albums in 1991. That same year, the song "Wind of Change" reached No. 4 on the Billboard Hot 100 and "Send Me an Angel" reached No. 44 on the same chart. It also has the only Scorpions track to credit bassist Francis Buchholz as a writer, on the song titled "Kicks After Six". This album was the band's first album since 1974's Fly to the Rainbow to not be produced by Dieter Dierks.

Crazy World became the band's only album to reach number one in their home country of Germany. In the UK, it remains the only Scorpions album to attain Silver certification (60,000 units sold) by the British Phonographic Industry, achieving this in November 1991. In the United States, it is the band's second best-selling album to 1984's Love at First Sting, and their last one to be certified at least gold by the RIAA. It was the band's last studio album to feature the Lovedrive-era lineup, with Buchholz leaving the band in October 1992.

"Hit Between the Eyes" was played during the ending credits of the 1992 film Freejack.

"Send Me an Angel" was played at the closing scene in the 2004 Cold Case episode "Who's Your Daddy." "Wind of Change" was also used during the 2009 film Gentlemen Broncos and towards the end of the 2014 film The Interview and international version soundtrack featured Nutri Ventures in pilot episode.

== Reception ==
Adrien Begrand writing for PopMatters called the album "pop metal by [the] numbers".

== Track listing ==
Side one
No.	Title	Lyrics	Music	Length
1.	"Tease Me Please Me"	Klaus Meine, Herman Rarebell, Vallance	Matthias Jabs, Jim Vallance	4:44
2.	"Don't Believe Her"	Rarebell, Meine, Vallance	Rudolf Schenker, Vallance	4:55
3.	"To Be with You in Heaven"	Meine	Schenker	4:48
4.	"Wind of Change"	Meine	Meine	5:13
5.	"Restless Nights"	Meine, Rarebell, Vallance	Schenker	5:44
Total length:				25:24

Side two
No.	Title	Lyrics	Music	Length
1.	"Lust or Love"	Meine, Rarebell, Vallance	Meine	4:22
2.	"Kicks After Six"	Rarebell, Meine, Vallance	Francis Buchholz, Vallance	3:49
3.	"Hit Between the Eyes"	Rarebell, Meine, Vallance	Schenker	4:33
4.	"Money and Fame"	Jabs, Rarebell	Jabs	5:06
5.	"Crazy World"	Meine, Schenker, Rarebell, Vallance	Schenker	5:08
6.	"Send Me an Angel"	Meine	Schenker	4:32
Total length:				27:30

== Personnel ==
=== Scorpions ===
- Klaus Meine – vocals, additional "gang" vocals on "Tease Me Please Me", additional "bang" vocals on "Crazy World"
- Rudolf Schenker – rhythm guitar, lead guitar on "Wind of Change" and "Send Me an Angel", additional "gang" vocals on "Tease Me Please Me", additional "bang" vocals on "Crazy World"
- Matthias Jabs – lead guitar, rhythm guitar on "Wind of Change" and "Send Me an Angel", additional "gang" vocals on "Tease Me Please Me"
- Francis Buchholz – bass
- Herman Rarebell – drums

=== Additional musicians ===
- Koen van Baal – keyboards on "Wind of Change"
- Jim Vallance – keyboards on "Send Me an Angel"
- Russell Powell – guitars
- Roy Tesse, Dries van der Schuyt, Ria Makker, Gerard v.d. Pot, Louis Spillman, Wolfgang Praetz, Inka Esser, Claudia Frohling, Cliff Roles, Peter Angmeer, Tony Ioannoua and Jim Lewis – "gang" vocals on "Tease Me Please Me"
- Marcel Gelderblom, Mirjam Erftemeijer, Henk Horden and Patrick Ulenberg – "bang" vocals on "Crazy World"

=== Production ===
- Keith Olsen – producer, engineer, mixing, additional "gang" vocals on "Tease Me Please Me", additional "bang" vocals on "Crazy World"
- Erwin Musper – engineer, mixing, additional "gang" vocals on "Tease Me Please Me", additional "bang" vocals on "Crazy World"
- Shay Baby – additional engineering, mixing
- Attie Bauw, Albert Boekholt, Tom Fletcher – assistant engineers

== Charts ==
Chart performance for Crazy World
Chart (1990–1991)	Peak position
Australian Albums (ARIA)	49
Austrian Albums (Ö3 Austria)	1
Canada Top Albums/CDs (RPM)	20
Dutch Albums (Album Top 100)	6
Finnish Albums (The Official Finnish Charts)	14
French Albums (SNEP)	2
German Albums (Offizielle Top 100)	1
Hungarian Albums (MAHASZ)	5
Italian Albums (Musica e Dischi)	13
Japanese Albums (Oricon)	39
Norwegian Albums (VG-lista)	4
Swedish Albums (Sverigetopplistan)	6
Swiss Albums (Schweizer Hitparade)	3
UK Albums (Official Charts)	27
US Billboard 200	21

== Certifications ==
Region	Certification	Certified units/sales
Austria (IFPI Austria)	Platinum	50,000^{*}
Belgium (BRMA)	Gold	25,000^{*}
Canada (Music Canada)	2× Platinum	200,000^{^}
Denmark (IFPI Danmark)	Platinum	80,000^{^}
Finland (Musiikkituottajat)	Gold	40,716
France (SNEP)	Platinum	300,000^{*}
Germany (BVMI)	2× Platinum	1,000,000^{^}
Greece (IFPI Greece)	Gold	30,000
Italy (FIMI)	Gold	100,000
Mexico (AMPROFON)	Gold	100,000^{^}
Netherlands (NVPI)	Gold	50,000^{^}
Norway (IFPI Norway)	Gold	50,000
Spain (Promusicae)	Gold	50,000^{^}
Sweden (GLF)	Gold	50,000^{^}
Switzerland (IFPI Switzerland)	3× Platinum	150,000^{^}
United Kingdom (BPI)	Gold	100,000^{^}
United States (RIAA)	2× Platinum	2,000,000^{^}
Summaries
Southeast Asia	—	400,000
Worldwide	—	7,000,000
^{*} Sales figures based on certification alone.^{^} Shipments figures based on certification alone.
