= Virgin Killer =

1976 studio album by Scorpions

- The original album cover. The cracked-glass effect is part of the original image.

Studio album by Scorpions
- Released: 22 November 1976
- Recorded: 1976
- Studios: Dierks Studios, Stommeln, West Germany
- Genres: Hard rock; heavy metal
- Length: 34:45
- Label: RCA
- Producer: Dieter Dierks

Scorpions chronology
In Trance (1975)	Virgin Killer (1976)	Taken by Force (1977)

Singles from Virgin Killer
- 1. "Pictured Life" Released: 1977 (Japan); 2. "Virgin Killer" Released: 1977 (Japan)

Alternative cover
- The replacement cover used in some countries

Virgin Killer is the fourth studio album by the German rock band Scorpions, released on 22 November 1976 by RCA Records. It was the band's first album to attract attention outside Europe. The title is described as being a reference to time as the killer of innocence. The original cover featured a nude ten-year-old girl, which stirred controversy in the United Kingdom, the United States, and elsewhere. As a result, the album was re-issued with a different cover in some countries.

The image again gave rise to a controversy in December 2008, when the British Internet Watch Foundation placed certain pages from Wikipedia on its internet blacklist, since it considered the image to be "potentially illegal" under the Protection of Children Act 1978, effectively classifying the website as child pornography. This resulted in much of the UK being prevented from editing Wikipedia and significant public debate on the decision. The decision was reversed by the IWF after four days of blocking.

== Critical reception ==
Professional ratings
Review scores
Source	Rating
AllMusic	4/5 stars

Virgin Killer failed to attain any serious attention in the United States but was quite popular in Japan, according to AllMusic, where it peaked at number 32 in the charts in the nation. The album was another step in the band's shift from psychedelic music to hard rock. Critic Vincent Jeffries of AllMusic contend that the album was "the first of four studio releases that really defined the Scorpions and their urgent metallic sound that was to become highly influential." He also counts the title track and "Pictured Life" among the "all-time Scorpions standouts." Lead guitarist Uli Jon Roth considers Virgin Killer and the previous release In Trance, his favourite Scorpions albums.

== Cover photo ==
The original cover art for the album depicted a nude ten-year-old girl, with a shattered glass effect obscuring her genitalia. The image was designed by Steffan Böhle who was then the product manager for the West German branch of RCA Records. In a 2007 interview bassist Francis Buchholz recollects that the girl depicted on the cover was either the daughter or the niece of the cover designer. The photograph was taken by Michael von Gimbut. The band's rhythm guitarist Rudolf Schenker offers the following description of the circumstances behind the album cover:

We didn't actually have the idea. It was the record company. The record company guys were like, "Even if we have to go to jail, there's no question that we'll release that." On the song "Virgin Killer" time is the virgin killer. But then, when we had to do the interviews about it, we said "Look, listen to the lyrics and then you'll know what we're talking about. We're using this only to get attention. That's what we do." Even the girl, when we met her fifteen years later, had no problem with the cover. Growing up in Europe, sexuality, of course not with children, was very normal. The lyrics really say it all. Time is the virgin killer. A kid comes into the world very naive, they lose that naiveness and then go into this life losing all of this getting into trouble. That was the basic idea about all of it.

In a separate interview Schenker also notes that he thought the cover art was a "great thing" and that he had "pushed the band to really stay behind it" as he felt that people would "think differently" when they looked at the lyrics and realized that the cover art was only being used as "a symbol of the lyrics". Schenker added: "We would never again do something like this". Roth notes that the cover art of the "old Scorpion albums" were "usually done by other people". He has since expressed regret over the original album cover:

Looking at that picture today makes me cringe. It was done in the worst possible taste. Back then I was too immature to see that. Shame on me—I should have done everything in my power to stop it. The record company came up with the idea, I think. The lyrics incidentally were a take-off on Kiss, whom we had just supported on a tour. I was fooling around and played the riff of the song in the rehearsal room and spontaneously improvised 'cause he's a virgin killer!' trying to do a more or less way-off-the-mark Paul Stanley impersonation. Klaus immediately said 'that's great! You should do something with it.' Then I had the unenviable task of constructing a meaningful set of lyrics around the title, which I actually managed to do to some degree. But the song has a totally different meaning from what people would assume at first. Virgin Killer is none other than the demon of our time, the less compassionate side of the societies we live in today—brutally trampling upon the heart and soul of innocence.

In 2008, photographer Michael von Gimbut emphasized that he, his wife, the girl's mother, sister, and three female assistants had been present during the shooting and stated: "Back then, we loved and protected children and did not sleep with them."

The cover generated controversy: the album could only be sold sealed in black plastic in several countries and the cover was replaced in some countries with an alternative cover art depicting the band members. The original is named in various "worst album cover" lists: Cracked named it the No. 1 "Worst Album Cover of All-Time", while Gigwise lists it as No. 1 on its March 2008 "The 50 Most Controversial Album Covers of All Time!" list. It was named by UGO Networks as one of the "Weirdest Album Covers" and placed No. 6 on the "All-Time Worst Album Covers" list made by two.one.five magazine.

This would not be the last time that the band attracted controversy with its album covers. Taken by Force originally featured cover art that depicted "children playing with guns at a military cemetery in France and some people found that offensive". Lovedrive featured a "bizarre artwork" that depicts "a woman on the back seat of a car with bubblegum over her breast". Both covers were replaced by an alternative design. Vocalist Klaus Meine explains that the band's penchant for controversial cover art stems from a desire "to go over the edge" and not "to offend some people or make the headlines [as] that would be stupid", contrasting guitarist Rudolf Schenker's earlier statement: "We're using this only to get attention." In a 2010 interview Meine commented on the cover art again stating:

Back in those days [the 1970s] it was RCA, our record label then, went over the edge with Virgin Killer. Today when you think of child pornography on the net, you would never do something like that. We never did this in the sense of pornography, we did it in the sense of art. It is about the song and the label was pushing the idea because they wanted to get the controversy to help the album sale and you cannot get better promotion than that. Looking back from the band point of view it was never an album cover that we took home to our parents and said, "Look what we just released." There was always mixed feelings about it and even 30 years later it caused a scandal at Wikipedia because the site for that album was blocked and even the FBI was getting involved. All of that after so many years, can you believe that?

In August 2015, a court in Sweden said that it considered the album cover to be child pornography.

=== Wikipedia controversy ===
In May 2008, the American far-right news site WorldNetDaily reported the cover image on Wikipedia to the Federal Bureau of Investigation (FBI). A subsequent investigation by the FBI concluded that the artwork did not violate any US laws. EContent magazine subsequently reported the Wikipedia community's internal debate: "Prior discussion has determined by broad consensus that the Virgin Killer cover will not be removed" and asserted that Wikipedia contributors "favour inclusion in all but the most extreme cases".

In December 2008, the Internet Watch Foundation (IWF), a UK-based non-government organization, added the Wikipedia article "Virgin Killer" to its internet blacklist due to concerns over legality of the image, which had been assessed as the lowest level of legal concern: "erotic posing with no sexual activity". As a result, people using many major UK ISPs were blocked from viewing the entire article by the Cleanfeed system. A large part of the UK was blocked from editing Wikipedia. Following representations by the Wikimedia Foundation (which hosts the Wikipedia website) and public complaints, the IWF reversed their decision three days later and confirmed that in future they would not block copies of the image that were hosted overseas. The IWF stated that one of the reasons for reversing their decision was that it had increased public interest in the image—an example of the Streisand effect.

In 2026, the non-government organization Save the Children Finland issued a memo urging the Finnish Wikipedia to remove the cover image on the basis that it "sexualises the child" and "can be seen as child sexual exploitation material". Following community discussion, the Finnish Wikipedia declined.

== Track listing ==
Side one
No.	Title	Writer(s)	Length
1.	"Pictured Life"	Klaus Meine, Ulrich Roth, Rudolf Schenker	3:21
2.	"Catch Your Train"	Meine, Schenker	3:32
3.	"In Your Park"	Meine, Schenker	3:39
4.	"Backstage Queen"	Meine, Schenker	3:10
5.	"Virgin Killer"	Roth	3:41

Side two
No.	Title	Writer(s)	Length
6.	"Hell-Cat"	Roth	2:54
7.	"Crying Days"	Meine, Schenker	4:36
8.	"Polar Nights"	Roth	5:04
9.	"Yellow Raven"	Roth	4:58
Total length:			34:45

== Personnel ==
Scorpions

- Klaus Meine – vocals
- Uli Jon Roth – lead guitars, rhythm guitar ("Polar Nights", "Yellow Raven"), vocals ("Hell-Cat", "Polar Nights")
- Rudolf Schenker – rhythm guitars (except on "Polar Nights" and "Yellow Raven")
- Francis Buchholz – bass
- Rudy Lenners – drums, percussion

Additional musicians

- Achim Kirschning – synthesizer, keyboards

Production

- Dieter Dierks – arrangement, production

== Covered songs ==
- "Pictured Life" was covered by the Greek power metal band Firewind on their début album Between Heaven and Hell in 2002.
- "Crying Days" was covered by Swedish symphonic metal band Therion for the various artist compilation A Tribute to the Scorpions, but was incorrectly labelled as "Polar Nights" in track list, thus making a rumor that Therion made a cover of "Polar Nights". This incorrect title spread to many catalogue sites, such as AllMusic. Therion added this cover of "Crying Days" as a bonus track to their 2001 album Secret of the Runes, labelling it correctly.
- "Yellow Raven" was covered by Swedish progressive metal band Pain of Salvation on their Linoleum EP in 2009.

== Charts ==
Chart (1976)	Peak position
Japanese Albums (Oricon)	32

== Certifications ==
Region	Certification	Certified units/sales
Germany	—	120,000
Japan (RIAJ)	Gold	100,000^{^}
^{^} Shipments figures based on certification alone.

== See also ==
- List of controversial album art
