= Rock You Like a Hurricane =

- Artwork for the pressing "made in EEC", whose photograph was also used for the UK release

Single by Scorpions

from the album Love at First Sting
- B-side: "Coming Home"
- Released: 30 January 1984
- Recorded: 1983
- Genre: Glam metal; hard rock; heavy metal; pop metal
- Length: 4:11
- Label: Harvest; Mercury
- Composer: Rudolf Schenker
- Lyricists: Klaus Meine; Herman Rarebell
- Producer: Dieter Dierks

Scorpions singles chronology
"Can't Live Without You" (1984)	"Rock You Like a Hurricane" (1984)	"Still Loving You" (1984)

Music video
- "Rock You Like a Hurricane" on YouTube

"Rock You Like a Hurricane" is a song by the German hard rock band Scorpions, considered their signature song. It was released as the lead single from their ninth studio album, Love at First Sting (1984). It was written by Klaus Meine, Herman Rarebell, Rudolf Schenker and arranged/produced by Dieter Dierks. The lyrics of "Rock You Like a Hurricane" also reference the title of the album on which it originally appeared – Love at First Sting.

In 2015, "Sleazegrinder" of Louder included the song in his list of "The 20 Greatest Hair Metal Anthems Of All Time".

== Chart performance ==
"Rock You Like a Hurricane" reached number 25 in the US Billboard Hot 100, greatly contributing to the album's success, and MTV put the video in heavy rotation.

== Accolades ==
In 2002, the Carolina Hurricanes used "Rock You Like a Hurricane" alongside their mascot Stormy as an intro for their team and Stormy plants a storm warning flag into PNC Arena. In 2009 it was named the 18th greatest hard rock song of all time also by VH1. On 15 November 2010 it was named the fourth best riff of the 1980s. The racetrack depicted on the single's sleeve corresponds to the Circuito de Jerez, located in Spain.

== Re-recordings ==
A new version was recorded in 2000 as "Hurricane 2000" on the album Moment of Glory, featuring Berlin Philharmonic Orchestra backing the track. In the same way, it was titled "Hurricane 2001" when played on the follow-up Acoustica. A third re-recording by the band features on their album Comeblack, released in 2011.

== Personnel ==
Band members

- Klaus Meine – lead and backing vocals
- Matthias Jabs – lead guitar
- Rudolf Schenker – rhythm guitar, backing vocals
- Francis Buchholz – bass
- Herman Rarebell – drums

Production

- Dieter Dierks – producer, mixing
- Gerd Rautenbach – engineer, mastering

== Notable appearances ==
The 2011 Comeblack re-recording was featured in the 2014 ad for Fiber One cookies, the films Knight and Day, Scouts Guide to the Zombie Apocalypse, The Angry Birds Movie, Caught Stealing, and in an episode of the TV shows The Simpsons, It's Always Sunny in Philadelphia, Stranger Things, The Big Bang Theory, The Boys and Knuckles. A version recorded in Spanish by Steph Honde and Micki Milosevic under the name of Unprotected Innocence was featured in and on the score for the 2019 Hellboy film. Rachel Bloom recorded a version of the song for Trolls World Tour as her character Barb.

== Charts ==
Chart (1984–1985)	Peak position
Canada Top Singles (RPM)	37
France (SNEP)	17
Netherlands (Single Top 100)	47
UK Singles (Official Charts)	78
US Billboard Hot 100	25
US Mainstream Rock (Billboard)	5

== Certifications ==
Region	Certification	Certified units/sales
Germany (BVMI)	Gold	300,000^{‡}
New Zealand (RMNZ)	Platinum	30,000^{‡}
United Kingdom (BPI)	Silver	200,000^{‡}
^{‡} Sales+streaming figures based on certification alone.
