= Savage Amusement =

Studio album by Scorpions
- Released: 18 April 1988
- Recorded: 1987–1988
- Studios: Dierks Studios, Stommeln, Scorpio Sound Studios, Hanover, West Germany
- Genres: Glam metal; hard rock
- Length: 37:19
- Labels: Harvest/EMI (Europe); Mercury (US)
- Producer: Dieter Dierks

Scorpions chronology
Love at First Sting (1984)	Savage Amusement (1988)	Crazy World (1990)

Singles from Savage Amusement
- 1. "Rhythm of Love" Released: May 1988; 2. "Believe in Love" Released: August 1988; 3. "Passion Rules the Game" Released: February 1989

Professional ratings
Review scores
Source	Rating
AllMusic	3/5 stars
Collector's Guide to Heavy Metal	5/10
Rock Hard	8.0/10

Savage Amusement is the tenth studio album by the German hard rock band Scorpions, released in 1988. It peaked at No. 5 in the US and was certified platinum by the RIAA on June 20, 1988. It was the last Scorpions record to be produced by Dieter Dierks.

== Cover art ==
The cover shows a woman wearing a black dress on a dark blue background. With her right hand she hides her eyes; thus, only her mouth and nose are visible. The cover of Savage Amusement is notable, however, for the fact that instead of the lady's right leg, a scorpion tail is seen. The typical band logo is shown on the upper left, while the title of the album is found in the lower right corner, in red, and underlined (also in red).

== Track listing ==
All lyrics are written by Klaus Meine, except where noted; all music is composed by Rudolf Schenker, except where noted.

No.	Title	Lyrics	Music	Length
1.	"Don't Stop at the Top"	Meine, Herman Rarebell		4:03
2.	"Rhythm of Love"			3:47
3.	"Passion Rules the Game"		Rarebell	3:58
4.	"Media Overkill"			3:32
5.	"Walking on the Edge"			5:05
6.	"We Let It Rock... You Let It Roll"			3:38
7.	"Every Minute Every Day"			4:21
8.	"Love on the Run"	Meine, Rarebell		3:35
9.	"Believe in Love"			5:20

2015 bonus tracks (50th Anniversary Deluxe Edition)
No.	Title	Lyrics	Music	Length
10.	"Taste of Love" (Demo Song)	Rarebell		4:35
11.	"Edge of Time" (Demo Version)			3:40
12.	"Fast and Furious" (Demo)		Matthias Jabs	3:08
13.	"Dancing in the Moonlight" (Demo Version of "Dancing with the Moonlight")		Jabs	3:07
14.	"Living for Tomorrow" (Demo Song)			3:37
15.	"I Can't Explain" (The Who cover)	Pete Townshend	Townshend	3:20

== Personnel ==
Scorpions

- Klaus Meine – lead vocals, backing vocals
- Rudolf Schenker – rhythm guitars, lead guitars, slide guitars, acoustic guitars, backing vocals
- Matthias Jabs – lead guitars, rhythm guitars, acoustic guitars, voice box, backing vocals (track 6)
- Francis Buchholz – bass, backing vocals (track 6)
- Herman Rarebell – drums, backing vocals (track 6)

Additional musicians

- Lee Aaron – backing vocals on "Rhythm of Love"
- Peter Baltes – intro vocals on "Every Minute Every Day"

Production

- Dieter Dierks – producer, engineer, mixing on tracks 2 and 9
- Ian Taylor, Gerd Rautenbach – engineers
- Mike Shipley – mixing on tracks 2 and 9
- Nigel Green and Scorpions – mixing at Battery Studios, London
- Howie Weinberg – mastering at Masterdisk, New York

== Charts ==
Chart (1988)	Peak position
Austrian Albums (Ö3 Austria)	18
Canada Top Albums/CDs (RPM)	25
Dutch Albums (Album Top 100)	24
Finnish Albums (The Official Finnish Charts)	1
French Albums (SNEP)	16
German Albums (Offizielle Top 100)	4
Italian Albums (Musica e Dischi)	17
Japanese Albums (Oricon)	32
Norwegian Albums (VG-lista)	5
Swedish Albums (Sverigetopplistan)	2
Swiss Albums (Schweizer Hitparade)	5
UK Albums (Official Charts)	18
US Billboard 200	5

== Certifications ==
Region	Certification	Certified units/sales
Canada (Music Canada)	Platinum	100,000^{^}
Finland (Musiikkituottajat)	Gold	34,906
France (SNEP)	Gold	100,000^{*}
Germany (BVMI)	Gold	250,000^{^}
Malaysia	Gold	20,000
Sweden (GLF)	Gold	50,000^{^}
Switzerland (IFPI Switzerland)	Gold	25,000^{^}
United States (RIAA)	Platinum	1,000,000^{^}
^{*} Sales figures based on certification alone.^{^} Shipments figures based on certification alone.
