= Animal Magnetism (Scorpions album) =

- Cover art by Hipgnosis

Studio album by Scorpions
- Released: 31 March 1980
- Recorded: October 1979 – February 1980
- Studios: Dierks, Stommeln, West Germany; Manta Sound, Toronto, Ontario, Canada
- Genres: Hard rock, heavy metal
- Length: 39:10
- Labels: Harvest (Europe); Mercury (US, Canada)
- Producer: Dieter Dierks

Scorpions chronology
Lovedrive (1979)	Animal Magnetism (1980)	Blackout (1982)

Singles from Animal Magnetism
- 1. "Lady Starlight" Released: April 1980; 2. "Make It Real" Released: May 1980; 3. "The Zoo" Released: August 1980

Professional ratings
Review scores
Source	Rating
AllMusic	2.5/5 stars
Collector's Guide to Heavy Metal	10/10
Rolling Stone	(favorable)

Animal Magnetism is the seventh studio album by German hard rock band Scorpions, released in 1980. The RIAA certified the record as Gold on 8 March 1984, and Platinum on 28 October 1991.

In the 2001 remaster edition by EMI, an extra track "Hey You" (rare single), sung by Rudolf Schenker is included (although Klaus Meine sings the chorus). The song was originally recorded during the Lovedrive sessions in 1978 and released two years later as side-A (together with "The Zoo" as side-B). A shorter remix from 1989 was used on the 2001 and 2015 reissues instead of the longer original single version.

"Lady Starlight" is the only song in the entire Scorpions discography so far (as of 2018) to include an arrangement for strings and orchestral winds.

== Artwork ==
The album cover was created by Storm Thorgerson of the design firm Hipgnosis and, as with earlier Scorpions album sleeves, courted controversy. However, unlike several of their previous album sleeves, the controversy did not result in the cover being replaced with an alternate sleeve. Recalling the cover photo, Thorgerson remarked, "That one was funny. I don't think we figured it out. We just knew there was something rude somewhere."

Scorpions bassist at the time, Francis Buchholz, recalls that, "Herman came up with the title for the album Animal Magnetism and we all liked it because it's an interesting title. So we had this guy Storm who was doing album covers for Pink Floyd, I think he did the one with the guy with the flames. So Storm came up with the idea for the Animal Magnetism cover, I personally didn't like it, but the rest of the band loved it. I liked the dog though."

== Track listing ==
All music is composed by Rudolf Schenker, except where noted

Side one
No.	Title	Lyrics	Music	Length
1.	"Make It Real"	Herman Rarebell		3:49
2.	"Don't Make No Promises (Your Body Can't Keep)"	Rarebell	Matthias Jabs	2:55
3.	"Hold Me Tight"	Klaus Meine, Rarebell		3:53
4.	"Twentieth Century Man"	Meine		3:00
5.	"Lady Starlight"	Meine		6:15

Side two
No.	Title	Lyrics	Music	Length
6.	"Falling in Love"	Rarebell	Rarebell	4:09
7.	"Only a Man"	Meine, Rarebell		3:32
8.	"The Zoo"	Meine		5:28
9.	"Animal Magnetism"	Meine, Rarebell		5:56

2001 CD remastered edition bonus track
No.	Title	Lyrics	Length
10.	"Hey You" (original version on Japanese and US versions of Best of Rockers 'n' Ballads (1989))	Meine, Rarebell	3:48

2015 bonus tracks (35th anniversary deluxe edition)
No.	Title	Lyrics	Length
10.	"Hey You" (vocals by Rudolf Schenker)	Meine, Rarebell	3:48
11.	"Animal Magnetism" (demo version)	Meine, Rarebell	4:30
12.	"American Girls" (demo song)	Meine	3:29
13.	"Get Your Love" (demo version of "Heroes Don't Cry")	Meine	3:42
14.	"Restless Man" (demo version of "Twentieth Century Man")	Meine	3:18
15.	"All Night Long" (demo song)	Meine	4:59

== Personnel ==
=== Scorpions ===
- Klaus Meine – vocals
- Rudolf Schenker – rhythm guitar, lead guitar (tracks 3–5, 9), acoustic guitar (track 5), vocals (track 10)
- Matthias Jabs – lead guitar (tracks 1, 2, 4, 6–8 and 10) slide guitar (track 9), talk box (track 8)
- Francis Buchholz – bass
- Herman Rarebell – drums

=== Additional musicians on "Lady Starlight" ===
- Allan Macmillan – strings and horns arrangements, conductor
- Adele Arman, Victoria Richard – violins
- Paul Arman – viola
- Richard Arman – cello
- Charles Elliot – double bass
- Melvin Berman – oboe
- George Stimpson, Brad Wamaar – French horns

=== Production ===
- Dieter Dierks – producer, engineer, mixing
- David Green – engineer on "Lady Starlight"
- Steve Fallone – mastering
- Howie Weinberg – re-mastering for CD

== Charts ==
Chart (1980)	Peak position
Canada Top Albums/CDs (RPM)	76
German Albums (Offizielle Top 100)	12
Swedish Albums (Sverigetopplistan)	37
UK Albums (Official Charts)	23
US Billboard 200	52

== Certifications ==
Region	Certification	Certified units/sales
Canada (Music Canada)	Gold	50,000^{^}
United States (RIAA)	Platinum	1,000,000^{^}
^{^} Shipments figures based on certification alone.
