= Blackout (Scorpions album) =

- Cover art by Gottfried Helnwein

Studio album by Scorpions
- Released: 8 March 1982
- Recorded: Early 1981; November 1981 – January 1982
- Studios: Villa San Pecaïre (Saint Jacques, Grasse, France) with Dierks Recording Mobile; Dierks Studios (Stommeln, West Germany)
- Genres: Hard rock, heavy metal
- Length: 36:44
- Label: Harvest/EMI
- Producer: Dieter Dierks

Scorpions chronology
Animal Magnetism (1980)	Blackout (1982)	Love at First Sting (1984)

Singles from Blackout
- 1. "Now!" Released: March 1982 (Japan); 2. "No One Like You" Released: March 1982; 3. "Can't Live Without You" Released: July 1982 (UK)

Professional ratings
Review scores
Source	Rating
AllMusic	4.5/5 stars
Collector's Guide to Heavy Metal	10/10
Forces Parallèles	5/5 stars
Rolling Stone	3/5 stars

Blackout is the eighth studio album by the German metal/Hard rock band Scorpions. It was released in 1982 by Harvest and EMI Records.

In the US, the album was certified gold on 24 June 1982 and platinum on 8 March 1984 by RIAA. Rolling Stone ranked Blackout as 73rd on their list of "The 100 Greatest Metal Albums of All Time" in 2017.

== Background ==
After losing his voice during the writing of the album, lead singer Klaus Meine had to undergo surgery on his vocal cords and was uncertain as to whether or not he would be able to record. Demos of the material were recorded with singer Don Dokken from Dokken, a then-unknown band from Los Angeles. However, none of those recordings are featured on the album and Dokken is only credited with backing vocals.

In Kerrang! issue 12, guitarist Rudolf Schenker said that he could not choose between his guitar solos on "China White" so the US and European releases differed in this detail.

A self-portrait of artist Gottfried Helnwein is featured on the cover of the album. Schenker portrays this character in the "No One Like You" music video.

== Track listing ==
All music is composed by Rudolf Schenker except where noted

Side one
No.	Title	Lyrics	Length
1.	"Blackout"	Klaus Meine, Herman Rarebell, Sonja Kittelsen	3:49
2.	"Can't Live Without You"	Meine	3:47
3.	"No One Like You"	Meine	3:57
4.	"You Give Me All I Need"	Rarebell	3:39
5.	"Now!"	Meine, Rarebell	2:35

Side two
No.	Title	Lyrics	Length
6.	"Dynamite"	Meine, Rarebell	4:12
7.	"Arizona"	Rarebell	3:56
8.	"China White"	Meine	6:59
9.	"When the Smoke Is Going Down"	Meine	3:50
Total length:			36:44

2015 bonus tracks (Deluxe Edition)
No.	Title	Lyrics	Music	Length
10.	"Blackout" (Demo Version)	Meine, Rarebell, Kittelsen		4:03
11.	"Running for the Plane" (Demo Song)	Meine		4:07
12.	"Sugar Man" (Demo Song)	Meine	Schenker, Matthias Jabs	4:22
13.	"Searching for the Rainbow" (Demo Song)	Meine		3:56

== Personnel ==
Scorpions

- Klaus Meine – lead vocals
- Rudolf Schenker – rhythm guitars, 6 & 12-string acoustic guitars, backing vocals (tracks 1, 2, 8), lead guitars (tracks 4, 8, 9)
- Matthias Jabs – lead guitars, 6-string acoustic guitar, rhythm guitars (track 4, 8, 9)
- Francis Buchholz – bass
- Herman Rarebell – drums

Others

- Don Dokken – backing vocals
- Tom Croucier – bass

Production

- Dieter Dierks – producer, engineer
- Gerd Rautenbach – mixing
- Bob Ludwig and Howie Weinberg – mastering at Masterdisk, New York

== Charts ==
Chart (1982)	Peak position
Canada Top Albums/CDs (RPM)	11
Dutch Albums (Album Top 100)	45
Finnish Albums (The Official Finnish Charts)	12
German Albums (Offizielle Top 100)	10
Japanese Albums (Oricon)	47
Swedish Albums (Sverigetopplistan)	12
UK Albums (Official Charts)	11
US Billboard 200	10

Chart (2015)	Peak position
UK Rock & Metal Albums (Official Charts)	27

== Certifications ==
Region	Certification	Certified units/sales
Canada (Music Canada)	Platinum	100,000^{^}
France (SNEP)	Gold	100,000^{*}
Mexico (AMPROFON)	Gold	100,000
United States (RIAA)	Platinum	1,000,000^{^}
^{*} Sales figures based on certification alone.^{^} Shipments figures based on certification alone.
