= Herman Rarebell =

German drummer (born 1949)

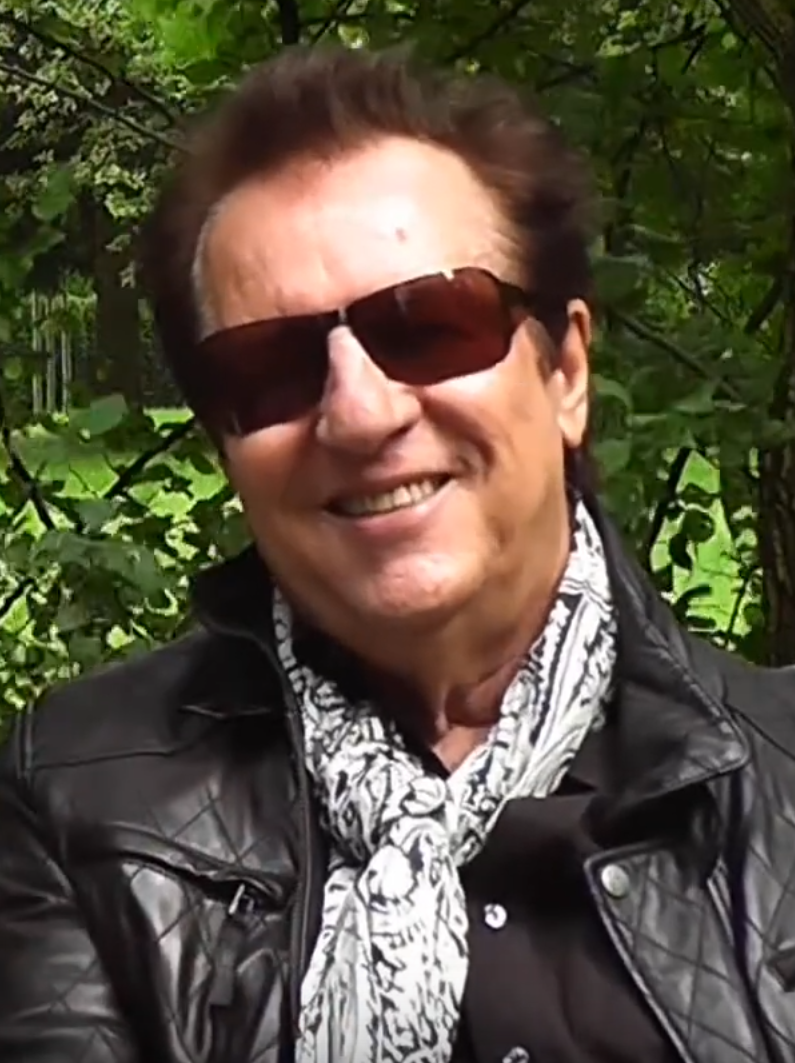
- Herman Rarebell in 2014

Background information
- Born: Hermann Erbel; 18 November 1949 (age 76)
- Origin: Schmelz, West Germany
- Genres: Hard rock; heavy metal
- Occupation: Drummer
- Years active: 1965–present
- Formerly of: Scorpions, Michael Schenker's Temple of Rock
- Website: hermanrarebell.com

Hermann Erbel (born 18 November 1949), known professionally as Herman Rarebell, is a German musician, best known as the drummer for the hard rock band Scorpions from 1977 to 1996, during which time he played on eight studio albums. Aside from playing drums, Rarebell wrote or co-wrote several songs for the group such as "Another Piece of Meat", "Falling in Love" and "Passion Rules the Game". He wrote the lyrics for some of the band's most well known songs such as "Rock You Like a Hurricane", "Blackout", "Make It Real", "Arizona", "Bad Boys Running Wild" and "Tease Me Please Me".

Herman Rarebell received his education in the subjects drums and piano at the Musikhochschule Saarbrücken. Rarebell played drums from 1965 with the band The Mastermen, from 1968 with The Fuggs Blues and RS Rindfleisch, with whom he released one single and performed in the clubs of the US military throughout Germany. In 1972–73, he played on three albums by the Krautrock band Missus Beastly, with a lineup consisting of three RS Rindfleisch members with a new singer and two additional musicians. The following year, he joined the band Onyx after the name change to Vineyard. During his time in Scorpions, Rarebell released two solo albums Nip in the Bud (1981) and Herman Ze German (1986).

== Setup ==
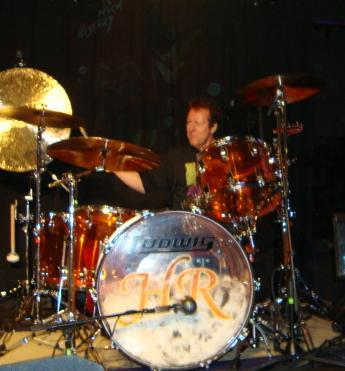
Herman Rarebell performing in 2011

Rarebell has been a long-time user of Ludwig drums and Paiste cymbals, which he used for his entire duration with Scorpions, though he would occasionally alter the amount of drums and cymbals he would have on his setup.

== Discography ==
Missus Beastly

- 1972 – Volksmusik
- 1973 – Spinatwachtel
- 1973 – Weramean · Missus Beastly (split) – Super Rock Made in Germany / Im Garten des Schweigens

Scorpions

- 1977 – Taken by Force
- 1978 – Tokyo Tapes
- 1979 – Lovedrive
- 1980 – Animal Magnetism
- 1982 – Blackout
- 1984 – Love at First Sting
- 1985 – World Wide Live
- 1988 – Savage Amusement
- 1990 – Crazy World
- 1993 – Face the Heat
- 1995 – Live Bites

Solo

- 1981 – Nip in the Bud
- 1986 – Herman Ze German
- 1986 – Herman Ze German and Friends: "Wipe Out" b/w "Pancake" (Single)
- 2005 – Drum Legends (Rarebell/Pete York/Charly Antolini)
- 2007 – I'm Back! (released in Germany, not distributed in the US)
- 2008 – My Life as a Scorpion
- 2008 – Herman's Collection (Best of solos)
- 2010 – Herman Ze German + My Life as a Scorpion (Box set)
- 2010 – HZG: "Top of the Rock" (Single)
- 2010 – Take It as It Comes (US version of I'm Back!)
- 2013 – Acoustic Fever

Michael Schenker's Temple of Rock

- 2011 – Temple of Rock
- 2013 – Bridge the Gap
- 2015 – Spirit in a Mission

Other

- 1995 – D. H. Cooper – Dee Cooper
- 2020 – Thomas Tomsen: "No Return to Earth"
