= Love at First Sting =

- Cover photo by Helmut Newton

Studio album by Scorpions
- Released: February 1984 (US)
- Recorded: 1983
- Studios: Dierks (Stommeln, West Germany)
- Genres: Hard rock; heavy metal; glam metal
- Length: 40:55
- Label: Harvest/EMI
- Producer: Dieter Dierks

Scorpions chronology
Blackout (1982)	Love at First Sting (1984)	Savage Amusement (1988)

Singles from Love at First Sting
- 1. "Rock You Like a Hurricane" Released: 27th March 1984; 2. "Still Loving You" Released: June 1984 (US); 3. "Big City Nights" Released: August 1984 (UK); 4. "I'm Leaving You" Released: November 1984 (US)

Alternate "clean" cover

Professional ratings
Review scores
Source	Rating
AllMusic	4.5/5 stars
Collector's Guide to Heavy Metal	7/10
Forces Parallèles	4/5 stars
Rock Hard	7.5/10
Rolling Stone	3/5 stars

Love at First Sting is the ninth studio album by German hard rock/heavy metal band Scorpions. It was released in February 1984 by Mercury Records in the US and in March 1984 by Harvest Records in the UK. The album contains "Rock You Like a Hurricane", "Still Loving You", and "Big City Nights", three of the band's most famous songs.

== Music ==
The album's music has been described as heavy metal, hard rock, and glam metal.

== Background and recording ==
The album was recorded at Dierks Studios in Stommeln, West Germany. Initial sessions took place in Stockholm's Polar Studios in the Summer of 1983 with ex-Rainbow members Jimmy Bain on bass and Bobby Rondinelli on drums, but nothing made it to the final album.

It became the group's most successful album in the US, where it peaked at number 6 on the Billboard 200 chart in 1984, and went double-platinum by the end of the year, reaching triple-platinum status in 1995. The song "Rock You Like a Hurricane" reached number 25 on the Billboard Hot 100 chart in the same year; "Still Loving You" reached number 64 on the same chart, number 14 in Germany, and number 3 in the French and Swiss single charts.

== Artwork ==
The original cover art was created by Kochlowski, which is a German graphic design company, and features a photo shot by renowned German photographer Helmut Newton. Despite the record company having shown the original cover art to retailers without any concerns, a complaint by Walmart in the US after the album was released resulted in PolyGram Records issuing a "clean" cover for use in several department store chains. The alternative cover was designed to be less controversial by simply showing a photo of the band members, which was the same photo as the one on the inner sleeve.

== Track listing ==
All lyrics are written by Klaus Meine except where noted; all music is composed by Rudolf Schenker except where noted.

Side one
No.	Title	Lyrics	Length
1.	"Bad Boys Running Wild"	Meine; Herman Rarebell	3:54
2.	"Rock You Like a Hurricane"	Meine; Herman Rarebell	4:11
3.	"I'm Leaving You"		4:16
4.	"Coming Home"		4:58
5.	"The Same Thrill"		3:30

Side two
No.	Title	Length
6.	"Big City Nights"	4:08
7.	"As Soon as the Good Times Roll"	5:01
8.	"Crossfire"	4:31
9.	"Still Loving You"	6:26

2015 bonus tracks (50th anniversary deluxe edition)
No.	Title	Music	Length
10.	"Coming Home" (Demo Version)		3:17
11.	"Living at Night" (Demo Song)		4:14
12.	"First Sting Jam" (Demo)	Matthias Jabs; Schenker	1:25
13.	"Anytime (You Want It)" (Demo Song)		5:16
14.	"Still Loving You" (Demo Version)		5:46

2015 bonus CD live at Madison Square Garden, New York City, 7 June 1984 (50th anniversary deluxe edition)
No.	Title	Length
1.	"Countdown"	1:58
2.	"Coming Home"	3:11
3.	"Blackout"	3:48
4.	"Bad Boys Running Wild"	4:11
5.	"Loving You Sunday Morning"	4:45
6.	"Big City Nights"	5:14
7.	"Coast to Coast"	4:58
8.	"Still Loving You"	5:52
9.	"Rock You Like a Hurricane"	4:20
10.	"The Zoo"	8:05
11.	"Dynamite"	6:41

== Personnel ==
Scorpions

- Klaus Meine – vocals
- Rudolf Schenker – rhythm guitar, lead guitar (6, 7, 9), backing vocals (2, 3, 8)
- Matthias Jabs – lead guitar, rhythm guitar (6, 7, 9)
- Francis Buchholz – bass, Moog Taurus
- Herman Rarebell – drums

Production

- Dieter Dierks – production, mixing
- Gerd Rautenbach – engineering, mastering
- Kochlowski/Missmahl/Pieczulski – cover design

== Charts ==
Chart (1984)	Peak position
Austrian Albums (Ö3 Austria)	19
Canada Top Albums/CDs (RPM)	15
Finnish Albums (The Official Finnish Charts)	4
French Albums (SNEP)	4
German Albums (Offizielle Top 100)	6
Japanese Albums (Oricon)	25
New Zealand Albums (RMNZ)	48
Swedish Albums (Sverigetopplistan)	17
Swiss Albums (Schweizer Hitparade)	9
UK Albums (Official Charts)	17
US Billboard 200	6

== Certifications ==
Region	Certification	Certified units/sales
Canada (Music Canada)	2× Platinum	200,000^{^}
France (SNEP)	Platinum	400,000^{*}
Germany (BVMI)	Gold	250,000^{^}
Japan (RIAJ)	Gold	100,000^{^}
Switzerland (IFPI Switzerland)	Gold	25,000^{^}
United States (RIAA)	4× Platinum	4,000,000^{^}
^{*} Sales figures based on certification alone.^{^} Shipments figures based on certification alone.
