= Lovedrive =

- Cover art by Hipgnosis

Studio album by Scorpions
- Released: 25 February 1979
- Studios: Dierks Studios, Stommeln, West Germany
- Genres: Hard rock, heavy metal
- Length: 36:49
- Label: Harvest
- Producer: Dieter Dierks

Scorpions chronology
Taken by Force (1977)	Lovedrive (1979)	Animal Magnetism (1980)

Michael Schenker chronology
Strangers in the Night (1979)	Lovedrive (1979)	The Michael Schenker Group (1980)

Singles from Lovedrive
- 1. "Loving You Sunday Morning" Released: March 1979 (US); 2. "Is There Anybody There?" Released: May 1979 (UK); 3. "Lovedrive" Released: July 1979 (UK); 4. "Another Piece of Meat" Released: 1979 (Ger.); 5. "Holiday" Released: 1979 (US)

Alternative cover

Professional ratings
Review scores
Source	Rating
AllMusic	4.5/5 stars
Classic Rock	4.5/5 stars
Forces Parallèles	4/5 stars
MusicHound Rock: The Essential Album Guide	2/5 stars

Lovedrive is the sixth studio album by the German rock band Scorpions, released in 1979. Considered by some critics to be the pinnacle of their career, Lovedrive was a major evolution in the band's sound, exhibiting their "classic style" that would be developed over the next few albums. Lovedrive cemented the "Scorpions formula" of hard rock combined with melodic ballads.

Following the band's departure from RCA, Lovedrive was their first album to be released by Harvest Records in Europe and Mercury Records in the United States and Canada. A major commercial breakthrough, it reached No. 55 on the Billboard Top 200, which none of their previous five albums had dented. The RIAA certified the record gold on 28 May 1986. In the United Kingdom, Lovedrive was the first Scorpions album to chart, peaking at No. 36.

Lovedrive ranked No. 25 on IGN's 2007 list of the top 25 metal albums.

"Another Piece of Meat" was lauded by Megadeth front man Dave Mustaine: "Michael Schenker was always the Kinder Egg of the Scorpions: y'know, would he appear on this record or not? Without a doubt, 'Another Piece of Meat' is my favourite song he did with the band. There were these really tasty little blurts of guitar that he did in between the vocal lines, and he would almost take this running jump at the solo. It was different from anything I'd heard before in heavy metal." Mustaine also acclaimed the title track: "You've got that cool, galloping riff, and behind it a second guitar doing counterpoint, which shows you how beautiful a guitar duo can be, if they know how to work off each other."

== Line-up changes ==
This is the first album to feature Matthias Jabs on lead guitar, and thus the first record to feature the band's "classic" lineup. Jabs replaced Uli Jon Roth, who went on to form his own band, Electric Sun.

Michael Schenker, younger brother of rhythm guitarist Rudolf, had just split from UFO. He recorded lead guitars on "Another Piece of Meat", "Coast to Coast", "Holiday", "Loving You Sunday Morning" and "Lovedrive". At the beginning of the Scorpions' German tour in February 1979, Michael rejoined the band and the group reluctantly parted ways with Matthias Jabs. However, in April 1979, while the band was touring in France, Michael quit. After intense negotiations, Jabs returned immediately.

== Artwork ==
The original cover depicted a well-dressed man and woman in the back of a car, with the woman's right breast partially exposed and connected to the man's hand by stretched bubblegum. The back cover featured the same man and woman holding a photograph of the band, with the woman's left breast completely exposed, without any gum. Created by Storm Thorgerson of the design firm Hipgnosis, it caused controversy in the US. Thorgerson remarked: "Not exactly the most politically correct scene you've ever seen. I thought it was funny, but women read a different inflection into it now." Later pressings instead bore a simple design of a blue scorpion on a black background. The original, uncensored art was restored for a remaster series.

In 2010, singer Klaus Meine commented: "We just did not know it would be a problem in America. It was just sex and rock 'n' roll. It is odd that, in America, some of these covers were a problem, because in the '80s when we would tour here, we always had boobs flashed to us at the front of the stage. Nowhere else in the world, just here. We just did not think it would be a problem to put out a record like Lovedrive in America."

== Track listing ==
All music is composed by Rudolf Schenker, except "Another Piece of Meat" by Herman Rarebell and Schenker.

Side one
No.	Title	Lyrics	Length
1.	"Loving You Sunday Morning"	Klaus Meine, Rarebell	5:36
2.	"Another Piece of Meat"	Rarebell	3:30
3.	"Always Somewhere"	Meine	4:56
4.	"Coast to Coast"	(instrumental)	4:42

Side two
No.	Title	Lyrics	Length
5.	"Can't Get Enough"	Meine	2:36
6.	"Is There Anybody There?"	Meine, Rarebell	3:58
7.	"Lovedrive"	Meine	4:49
8.	"Holiday"	Meine	6:32

2015 Bonus tracks (50th Anniversary Deluxe Edition)
No.	Title	Lyrics	Length
9.	"'Cause I Love You" (demo version)	Meine	4:31
10.	"Holiday" (demo version)	Meine	9:34

2015 Bonus DVD: Live in Japan 1979 / Documentary (50th Anniversary Deluxe Edition)
No.	Title	Lyrics	Music	Length
1.	"Intro"			0:50
2.	"We'll Burn the Sky"	Monika Dannemann	Schenker	7:27
3.	"Lovedrive"			4:48
4.	"Life's Like a River"	Corina Fortmann	Ulrich Roth, Schenker	4:04
5.	"Fly to the Rainbow"	Roth	Michael Schenker, Roth	2:28
6.	"Is There Anybody There?"			4:07
7.	"Another Piece of Meat"			3:15
8.	"Can't Get Enough"			6:23
9.	"Kōjō no Tsuki"	Bansui Doi	Rentarō Taki, arranged by Scorpions	3:09
10.	"Documentary: The Story of Lovedrive" (Interviews with Klaus Meine, Rudolf Schenker, Matthias Jabs and Herman Rarebell)			46:57

== Personnel ==
Scorpions

- Klaus Meine – vocals
- Rudolf Schenker – rhythm guitar, lead guitar on track 3
- Francis Buchholz – bass
- Herman Rarebell – drums
- Matthias Jabs – lead guitar on tracks 1, 5 & 6

Additional musician

- Michael Schenker – lead guitar ("Loving You Sunday Morning", "Another Piece of Meat", "Coast to Coast", "Lovedrive", "Holiday" and "'Cause I Love You")

Production

- Dieter Dierks – producer, engineer, mixing
- Steve Fallone – mastering

== Charts ==
Chart (1979)	Peak position
French Albums (SNEP)	10
German Albums (Offizielle Top 100)	11
Japanese Albums (Oricon)	70
Swedish Albums (Sverigetopplistan)	32
UK Albums (Official Charts)	36
US Billboard 200	55

== Certifications ==
Region	Certification	Certified units/sales
France (SNEP)	2× Gold	200,000^{*}
Germany (BVMI)	Gold	250,000^{^}
United States (RIAA)	Gold	500,000^{^}
^{*} Sales figures based on certification alone.^{^} Shipments figures based on certification alone.
