= Shred guitar =

Virtuoso lead guitar solo playing style

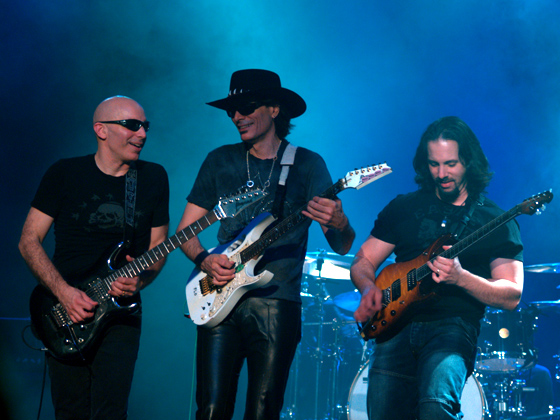
Joe Satriani, Steve Vai and John Petrucci at the G3 (tour) in December 2006

Shred guitar is a virtuosic style of electric guitar performance. Categorized by its use of advanced techniques, shredding is a complex art form. Shred guitar includes fast alternate picking, sweep-picking, diminished and harmonic minor scales, tapping, and whammy bar use. Often incorporated in heavy metal, guitarists employ a guitar amplifier and a range of effects such as distortion. This creates a sustained guitar tone and may facilitate guitar feedback.

The term is sometimes used in reference to virtuosic playing by instrumentalists other than guitarists as well. The term "shred" is used outside the metal idiom, particularly by bluegrass musicians and jazz-rock fusion electric guitarists.

== History ==
Many jazz guitarists in the 1950s such as Les Paul, Barney Kessel and Tal Farlow used an improvised technique by raking the pick across the strings to play a rapid succession of notes, today known as sweep picking. Les Paul's performance of "How High the Moon" contained sweep picking, one of the earliest recordings of the technique.

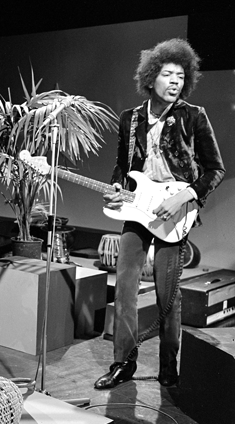
Jimi Hendrix in 1967

Jimi Hendrix, Eric Clapton, and Jeff Beck further developed guitar techniques towards the end of the 1960s.

Ritchie Blackmore, best known as the guitarist of Deep Purple and Rainbow, was an early shredder. He founded Deep Purple in 1968 and combined elements of blues, jazz and classical into his high speed, virtuosic rock guitar playing. Songs like "Highway Star" and "Burn" from Deep Purple and "Gates of Babylon" from Rainbow are examples of early shred. Blackmore was distinguished by his use of complex arpeggios and harmonic minor scales. His influence on Randy Rhoads and Yngwie Malmsteen is considered definitive for the evolution of the genre.

In 1969, guitarist Jimmy Page from Led Zeppelin composed "Heartbreaker"; his guitar solo introduced many complex techniques mixed together (very fast playing with hammer-ons and pull-offs). Page included excerpts of classical music in the solo when playing it live.

In 1969, Alvin Lee's lightning-fast licks playing at Woodstock were also a prime example of early shredding.

In September 1973, guitarist and singer Glen Campbell used shredding technique in between verses while performing a jazzy version of (Back Home Again in) Indiana on The Tonight Show.

In 1974, the German band Scorpions used their new guitarist Ulrich Roth for their album Fly to the Rainbow, for which the title track features Roth performing "one of the most menacing and powerful whammy-bar dive bombs ever recorded". A year later, Roth's solo guitar playing for the album In Trance would become "the prototype for shred guitar. Everything associated with the genre can be found on this brilliant collection of songs—sweep-picked arpeggios, harmonic minor scales, finger-tapping and jaw-dropping whammy bar abuse". Also in 1974, the song "Free Bird" by Lynyrd Skynyrd was released, and the guitar solo in the song is widely acclaimed as an earlier example of shredding.

In 1978, Eddie Van Halen recorded "Eruption", using the tapping technique in his instrumental. Niccolò Paganini used similar techniques on the violin in the early 1800s. This is found in traditional Turkish folk music. The first example on the guitar was in 1932 by Roy Smeck.

In 1979, Roth left Scorpions to begin his own power trio, Electric Sun. Their debut album Earthquake contained "heaps of spellbinding fret gymnastics and nimble-fingered classical workouts."

Randy Rhoads and Yngwie Malmsteen advanced this style with the infusion of neo-classical elements. Progressive rock, heavy metal, hard rock, and jazz fusion have all made use of and adapted the style successfully over the years. In general, the phrase "shred guitar" has been traditionally associated with instrumental rock and heavy metal guitarists. This association has become less common now that modern forms of metal have adopted shredding as well. In the 1990s, its mainstream appeal diminished with the rise of grunge and nu metal, both of which eschewed flashy lead guitar solos. Lesser known guitarists like Shawn Lane and Buckethead continued to develop the genre further in the 1990s.

== Playing style ==
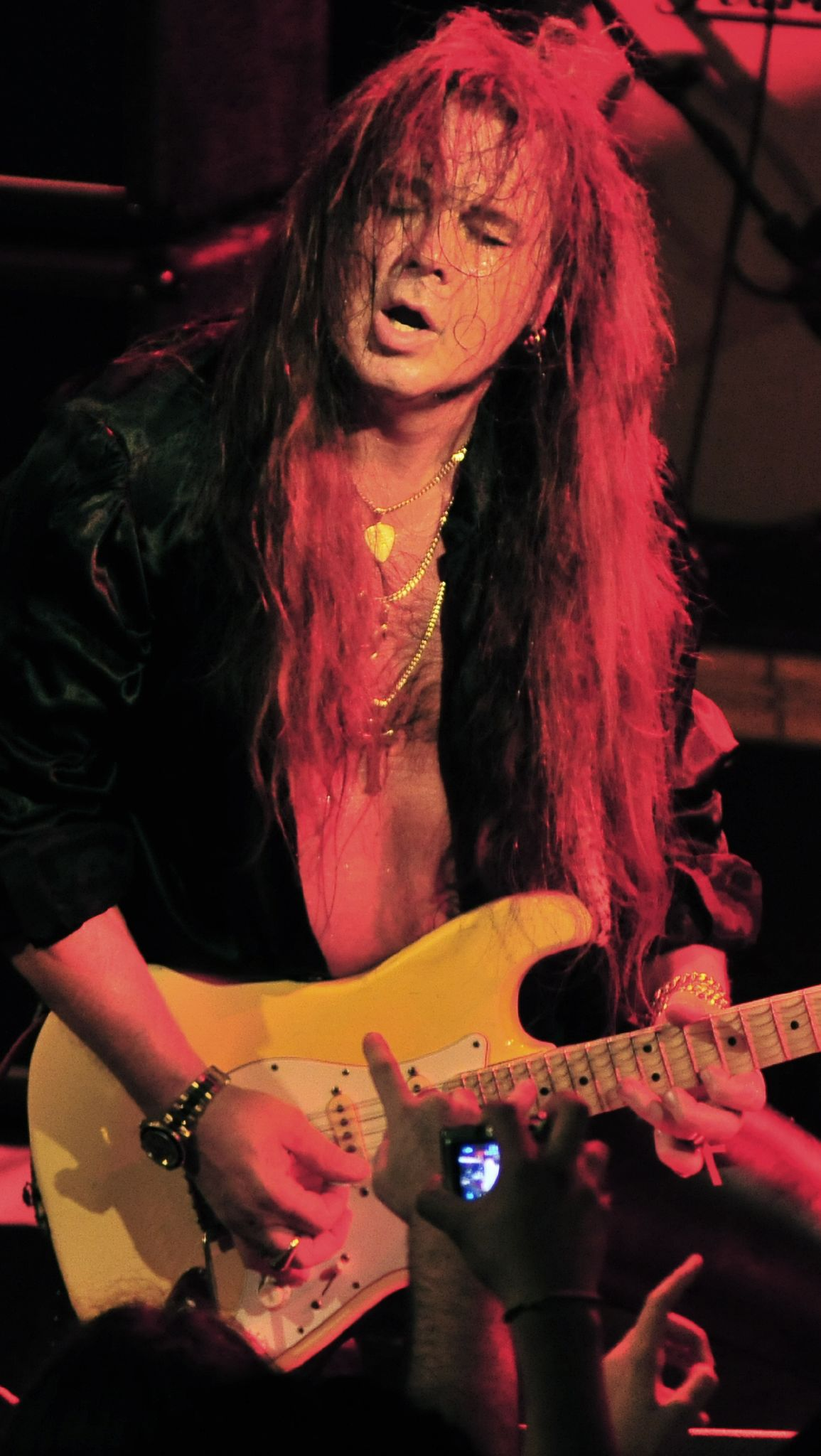
Yngwie Malmsteen in Barcelona, Spain, 2008

Shredding includes difficult guitar techniques such as "sweep, alternate, and tremolo picking; string skipping; multi-finger tapping; slurs, [and] trills." Shred guitarists use two - three octave scales, triads, or modes, played ascending and descending at a fast tempo. Often such runs are arranged in the form of an intricate sequential pattern, creating a more complex feel.

A lick in guitar playing consists of a short sequence of notes which form a phrase. One famous example of this concept is "The Lick", which is a commonly used jazz phrase based on the minor scale. In shredding, licks become more complex by including advanced guitar techniques. Playing licks at fast tempos also adds complexity. Using short rhythmic figures like 16th notes/triplets creates faster licks. For every beat of the metronome, the guitarist plays three/four notes depending on the rhythm. Shorter rhythms may be difficult for new players. Precision is crucial to achieving the desired effect. If the notes are sloppy, the playing sounds amateur.

Guitarists use rehearsed licks in otherwise improvised solos, or for practicing. Guitarists often 'trade licks' with each other, sharing such sequences.

The lick can be played by multiple-picking notes (alternate picking), or picking just the first or second note of a string followed by a rapid succession of hammer-ons and/or pull-offs (slurs). Rhythmically, a shredder may include precise usage of syncopation and polyrhythms. Sweep picking is used to play rapid arpeggios across the fretboard (sometimes on all strings). The tapping technique is used to play rapid flourishes of notes or to play arpeggios or scalar patterns using pure legato with no picking (the picking hand is used to "tap" notes on the fretboard). Various techniques are used to perform passages with wide intervals, and to create a flowing legato sound. Some performers utilize complex combinations of tapping, sweeping, and classical-style finger picking. This increases speed by reducing the motion of the plucking hand.

== Equipment ==
Dive bomb effect
Dive bomb effect, a typical deep pitch bend using a whammy bar; followed by string noise.

Shred guitar players often use electric solid-body guitars from brands such as Charvel, ESP, Fender, Gibson, Ibanez, Jackson, Kiesel/Carvin, Kramer and Schecter. Some shred guitarists use elaborately shaped models by B.C. Rich or Dean, as well as modern versions of classic-radical designs like Gibson's Flying V and Explorer models. Tremolo bars (also known as "whammy bars"), which are hinged bridges that can be bent down or up in pitch, are an important part of shred playing, as they permit the "dive bombing" effect and many sounds which are not possible with a fixed-bridge instrument.

Guitars with double-cutaways give performers easier access to the higher frets, allowing extended room for the fretting hand to get extended reach onto the higher notes of the fretboard. Some shred guitarists, such as Scorpions' Ulrich Roth, have used custom-made tremolo bars and developed modified instruments, such as Roth's "Sky Guitar, that would greatly expand his instrumental range, enabling him to reach notes previously reserved in the string world for cellos and violins."

Most shred guitar players use a range of effects such as distortion and audio compression units, both of which increase sustain and facilitate the performance of shred techniques such as tapping, hammer-ons, and pull-offs. These and other effects units, such as delay effects are also used to create a unique tone. Shred-style guitarists often use high-gain vacuum tube amplifier brands such as Bogner, Marshall, Carvin, Peavey, Soldano, Mesa Boogie, Orange, Laney, Hughes & Kettner and Randall. To facilitate the use of audio feedback effects with the guitar, shred guitarists use high gain settings, distortion pedals and high on-stage volume.

== In media ==
In 2007, various shredders were parodied by the Finnish multimedia artist Santeri Ojala who uploaded a series of "Shreds" videos to YouTube under the pseudonym StSanders. The most popular videos mocked Eric Clapton, Metallica, Steve Vai and Kiss by replacing the original concert performance sound with badly played electric guitar and other noises. Ojala's videos went viral but they were taken down by YouTube in early 2008 for copyright infringement. The videos continued to be available at Ojala's StSanders website, and through his MySpace page. Wired magazine also provided a webhost for the videos. The American comedian Jimmy Kimmel was a fan of the videos, and he asked Ojala to appear on the next Jimmy Kimmel Live! show with Slash, the guitarist for Guns N' Roses, who was already a target for Ojala's satire. Live on the show, Slash appeared uncomfortable during Ojala's demonstration of the parody technique, interrupting him to show what an actual Slash guitar solo sounded like. Ojala said, however, that Slash praised his work backstage, after the show: "...he liked the video, he had no problem with it." Other online parodies appeared after this, created by other artists. These were collectively called "X Shreds" videos.

In 2011, Guitar World magazine focused on shredding outside the heavy metal music genre with an article discussing the magazine's Top 5 Shredding Bluegrass songs. The list included songs by instrumentalists Tony Rice, Josh Williams, Bryan Sutton, Chris Thile and David Grier. Music Radar's list of the top 20 greatest shred guitarists of time featured Al Di Meola, John Petrucci and Steve Vai as the top three, respectively. Guitar World ranked Al Di Meola – Elegant Gypsy, Van Halen – Van Halen, and Ozzy Osbourne – Blizzard of Ozz (featuring Randy Rhoads on guitar), as the top three shred albums of all time, respectively.

In 2017, Jawbone Press released the book Shredders!: The Oral History of Speed Guitar (and More) by author Greg Prato, which explored the entire history of shred guitar. The book featured a foreword by Alex Lifeson and an afterword by Uli Jon Roth, and featured all new interviews with Joe Satriani, Steve Vai, Billy Sheehan, Paul Gilbert, George Lynch, Kirk Hammett, Michael Schenker, Ace Frehley, Guthrie Govan, and Alexi Laiho, among others.

== See also ==
- Heavy metal guitar
- Djent
