= Beyond the Astral Skies =

Studio album by Electric Sun
- Released: 1985
- Recorded: December 1983 and April 1984
- Label: EMI
- Producer: Uli Jon Roth

Electric Sun chronology
Fire Wind (1980)	Beyond the Astral Skies (1985)

Beyond the Astral Skies is the third and final album by Electric Sun. It was released in 1985 on EMI.

== Track listing ==
- All songs composed by Uli Jon Roth
1. "The Night the Master Comes" - 4:16
2. "What Is Love?" - 3:24
3. "Why?" - 4:51
4. "I'll Be There" - 5:02
5. "Return (Chant of Angels)" - 3:27
6. "Icebreaker" - 2:39
7. "I'm a River" - 4:45
8. "Angel of Peace" - 3:43
9. "Eleison" - 6:56
10. "Son of Sky" - 2:21

== Personnel ==
- Michael Flexig (as Michael Flechsig) - lead vocals on tracks 2, 6, 9, 10, harmony vocals on tracks 1–4 and 6–10
- Uli Jon Roth - lead and backing vocals, guitars, keyboards, bass
- Nicky Moore - harmony vocals on track 1
- Ule Ritgen - bass guitar, harmony vocals on tracks 2 and 4
- Clive Bunker - drums, timpani
- Elizabeth Mackenzie - soprano and alto on track 9
- Robert Curtis - violin and viola on track 9
- Jenni Evans - harmony vocals on tracks 1, 5, 6, 8
- Dorothy Patterson - harmony vocals on tracks 5, 6
- Zeno Roth - harmony vocals on tracks 1, 3, 6, 8
- Rainer Przywara - harmony vocals on tracks 2–4, 7, 9, 10

== Production ==
- Produced by Uli Jon Roth

== Influence ==
The composer-guitarist Andy DiGelsomina of Lyraka has mentioned the album as containing both his favorite guitar solos and tones.
