= Best of Scorpions =

Compilation album by Scorpions
- Released: November 1979
- Recorded: 1974–1977
- Genre: Heavy metal, hard rock
- Length: 38:48
- Label: RCA Records
- Producer: Dieter Dierks

Scorpions compilations chronology
Best of Scorpions (1979)	Hot & Heavy (1982)

Alternative Covers
- Top: Japanese Edition; Bottom: U.S. Edition

Professional ratings
Review scores
Source	Rating
Allmusic	4.5/5 stars
Kerrang!	(reissue)
Record Mirror	2.5/5 stars

Best of Scorpions is a compilation album by the German heavy metal band Scorpions. It was released in November 1979 in the United States. The record contains songs from their albums between Fly to the Rainbow and Taken by Force. No songs were culled from their debut album, Lonesome Crow.

The original German edition of the cover art featured an image of a scorpion stinging a naked girl's hip. The Japanese edition features an alternative cover showing a naked female's buttocks. The 1984 U.S. re-release cover featured an image of a man wearing a leather jacket and a scorpion necklace. The album was reissued for the first time on CD in 1984.

== Track listing ==
=== Side one ===
1. "Steamrock Fever" - 3:35 (from the album Taken by Force)
2. "Pictured Life" - 3:23 (from the album Virgin Killer)
3. "Robot Man" - 2:42 (from the album In Trance)
4. "Backstage Queen" - 3:12 (from the album Virgin Killer)
5. "Speedy's Coming" - 3:35 (from the album Fly to the Rainbow)
6. "Hell Cat" - 2:54 (from the album Virgin Killer)

=== Side two ===
1. "He's a Woman, She's a Man" - 3:14 (from the album Taken by Force)
2. "In Trance" - 4:43 (from the album In Trance)
3. "Dark Lady" - 3:25 (from the album In Trance)
4. "The Sails of Charon" - 4:24 (from the album Taken by Force)
5. "Virgin Killer" - 3:41 (from the album Virgin Killer)

Note that the Japanese edition of this album features the original version of "The Sails of Charon" with a length of 5:16. Other editions including the German and US versions feature an edited, shorter version with a length of 4:24

== Charts ==
Chart (1979)	Peak position
US Billboard 200	180
