= Under a Dark Sky =

Studio album by Uli Jon Roth
- Released: 2008
- Genre: Progressive rock
- Length: 63:40
- Label: SPV GmbH

Uli Jon Roth chronology
Metamorphosis of Vivaldi's Four Seasons (2003)	Under a Dark Sky (2008)	Scorpions Revisited (2015)

Professional ratings
Review scores
Source	Rating
Allmusic	link
Terrorizer	(Nov 2008)

Under a Dark Sky is a progressive rock album by Uli Jon Roth, featuring Mark Boals and Liz Vandall on vocals. It marks the first official release in the long-awaited series of Symphonic Legends, which is a cycle of music written for Roth's all-encompassing Sky of Avalon project.

Mark Boals has stated in an interview that the next installment is planned for the near future, and that he will appear in it.

Andy DiGelsomina, composer of the heavy metal opera Lyraka, calls it "the most relevant rock guitar album of the 21st century...it takes as its base the pioneering progressive rock of the 70s, and with the lead guitar in (Roth)'s hands, ups the expressive content of the compositions to a heretofore unrealized degree. Roth's guitar becomes like a separate voice, a vital protagonist in an apocalyptic opera.".

== Track listing ==
All tracks are written by Uli Jon Roth

No.	Title	Length
1.	"S.O.S."	4:09
2.	"Tempus Fugit"	2:32
3.	"Land of Dawn: i) Techno Man; ii) Land of Dawn; iii) Lion Wings"	11:09
4.	"The Magic Word"	6:11
5.	"Inquisition"
6.	"Letter of the Law"	3:03
7.	"Stay in the Light"	6:30
8.	"Benediction"	3:45
9.	"Light & Shadows"	6:13
10.	"Tanz in die Dämmerung: i) Destination Twilight; ii) Morgenrot; iii) Searchlights from Hell; iv) Seelenschmerz; v) Inside the Titanic; vi) Fama Errat; vii) Requiem For The Nations; viii) Morituri; ix) Rex Tremendae; x) Star Peace; xi) Tanz in die Dämmerung; xii) Silence"	18:55
