= MTV Unplugged – Live in Athens =

2013 MTV Unplugged by Scorpions

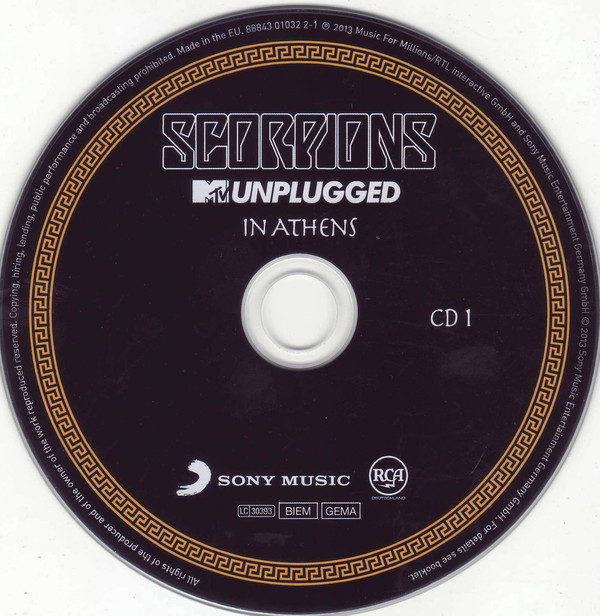

Live album by Scorpions
- Released: 29 November 2013
- Recorded: Lycabettus Theatre, Athens; 11–12 September 2013
- Genre: Acoustic rock
- Length: 1:49:08
- Label: Sony Music
- Producer: Mikael Andersson; Martin Hansen

Scorpions chronology
Comeblack (2011)	MTV Unplugged – Live in Athens (2013)	Return to Forever (2015)

Scorpions video video chronology
Live in 3D: Get Your Sting and Blackout (2011)	MTV Unplugged – Live in Athens (2013)	Forever and a Day (2015)

Singles from MTV Unplugged – Live in Athens
- 1. "Rock You Like a Hurricane" Released: 14 February 2014

MTV Unplugged – Live in Athens is the sixth live album by the German hard rock and heavy metal band Scorpions, released in 2013 by Sony Music. In late 2012, MTV proposed that the band take part in the MTV Unplugged concert series, an offer the members had previously declined on two occasions for various reasons. Once the project was confirmed, both parties agreed to hold the first open-air show in the series' history, for which they chose the theater on Mount Lycabettus in Athens. The decision to hold it in this city was due to several factors, although the main reason was that the band wanted to somehow reciprocate the unwavering support of their Greek fans.

During pre-production, guitarist Matthias Jabs and record producers Mikael Andersson and Martin Hansen selected and arranged the songs. The inclusion of new instruments allowed them to change the sound, tempo and musical genre of some of them. In total, three concerts were scheduled for 11, 12 and 14 September 2013, but only the first two were recorded. For the event, the band was supported by over a dozen musicians, including the producers, a string section and three guest vocalists.

Upon its release in several formats, including a double CD and DVD, it received generally positive reviews from the music press. The most highly praised aspects were the musicians' performances, the arrangements, the sound, Klaus Meine's vocal quality and the set list. In contrast, some reviewers had mixed opinions about the participation of the guest vocalists. Commercially, it achieved moderate positions on major music charts worldwide. Its success was primarily in Germany, where it reached number 5 on the Media Control Charts. Additionally, both the audio and video recordings received gold certification from the Bundesverband Musikindustrie.

As part of the album's promotion, Sony released three promotional singles in certain countries: the live versions of "Rock You Like a Hurricane" and "Still Loving You" and the studio version of "Passion Rules the Game". Furthermore, they released music videos on YouTube for "Dancing with the Moonlight", "Where the River Flows", "Passion Rules the Game" and "Rock You Like a Hurricane", although the latter featured brief footage from the making-of. Due to the album's success in Germany, the band performed the acoustic show live in 2014 only in Kempten, Munich, Cologne, Hamburg and Stuttgart.

== Background ==
Before finalizing the 2013 event, MTV had reportedly offered Scorpions the chance to be part of MTV Unplugged on two previous occasions.

On 24 January 2010, Scorpions announced that they would end their career and bid farewell to the public with the Get Your Sting and Blackout World Tour. Starting on 15 March in Prague, it allowed them to visit several countries over the following months, and was initially scheduled to include live performances until 2011. Due to its success, the performance on 15 April 2011 in Saarbrücken, Germany, was recorded for the subsequent live album and 3D DVD, Live 2011: Get Your Sting and Blackout. Furthermore, with the idea of having new recorded material to extend the tour, Sony Music requested the band record a new album. Thus, Scorpions recorded the cover and re-recording album Comeblack, which was released on 4 November 2011 in Europe, coinciding with the new tour extension called Final Sting, which increased the number of concerts until 17 December 2012. In January 2013, the band unexpectedly cancelled their retirement plans, because, in the words of vocalist Klaus Meine: "It's one thing to say, 'This is going to be the end of the Scorpions,' and another thing to do it." Meine claimed the decision changed gradually during the tour. (Note: Years later, Matthias Jabs pointed out that they genuinely considered the concert in Munich as the last one and that, if MTV's proposal hadn't arrived, it was very likely that Scorpions' career would have ended as planned.)

Around late 2012, MTV offered the band the chance to be part of the MTV Unplugged series. (Note: According to guitarist Matthias Jabs, the proposal was made by MTV along with Sony in January 2013.) The television channel had already proposed this idea to them in 1988, but Scorpions refused because they were recording the album Savage Amusement (1988) at the time. Later, MTV tried to contact the members again, although on this occasion they had to decline because they were on the promotional tour for Crazy World (1990). The concept of doing an acoustic event remained on the agenda for years, but for various reasons it never materialized. It wasn't until 2001, following a positive mood from experimenting with side projects after the crossover album Moment of Glory (2000), that the band independently released the unplugged album Acoustica, published on 14 May 2001 by East West Records. In a later interview, Meine noted that MTV's offer was like the "icing on the cake" after a long career and that they felt honored to be part of the "MTV Unplugged family".

== Recording ==
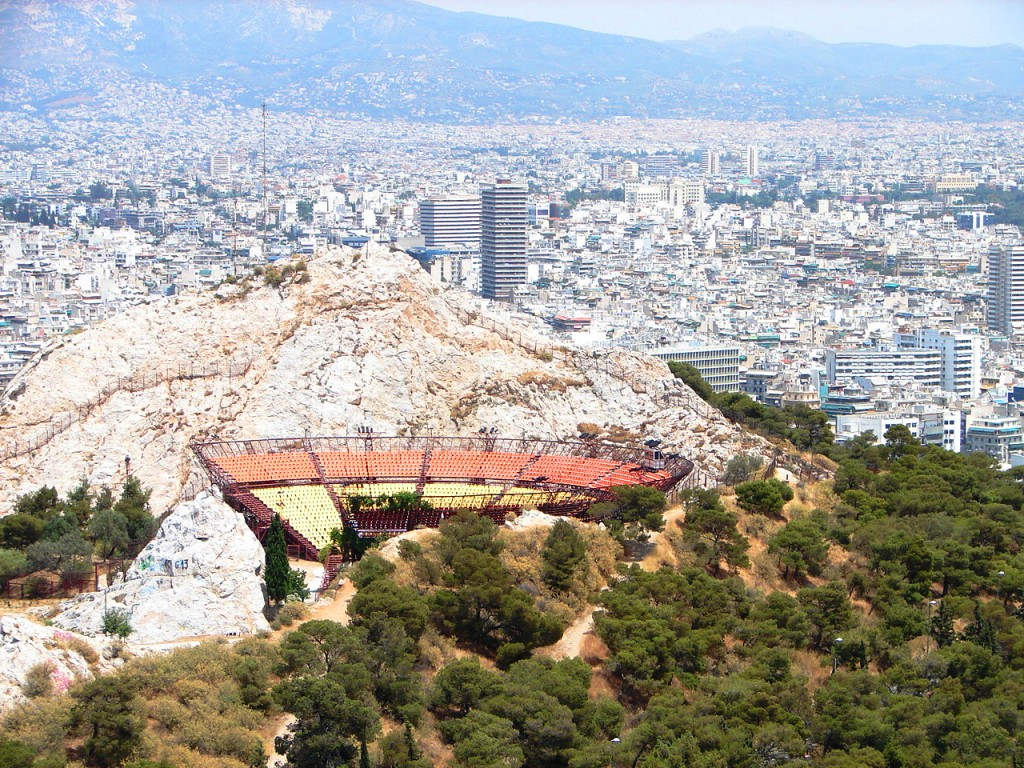
The recording took place at the Lycabettus Theatre in Athens, Greece.

At the time, MTV Unplugged shows were held indoors in front of a small audience, so both the band and the television channel agreed to challenge themselves and create the first open-air show in the series' history. To do this, they looked for an open-air venue, and it was the Greek producer and promoter Alex Alexopoulos who convinced MTV and Sony to hold it in a theater in Greece. Initially, they considered the Acropolis of Athens, but the space was limited, the sound quality was poor, and there were many restrictions from the government. Finally, they chose the theater on Mount Lycabettus in Athens. The choice was due to several factors, one of which was the weather, as for September, the month chosen for the recording, Greece is one of the few European countries that still maintains a pleasant temperature for this type of concert. Furthermore, the location was taken into consideration, as being situated at the highest point of the city provided a "beautiful setting", according to Meine. However, the main reason was that the band wanted to reciprocate the unwavering support of their Greek fans, as, up to that point, their last three studio albums —Unbreakable (2004), Humanity: Hour I (2007) and Sting in the Tail (2010)— had reached number one on the national music chart. Furthermore, according to Blabbermouth.net, for several years the Greek public had voted Scorpions as one of the most popular artists, their compilation album Best was one of the best-selling, and, until 2009, more than 150,000 people had attended their concerts in Greece.

In total, three concerts were scheduled for 11, 12 and 14 September 2013, although only the first two were recorded. The shows started at 8:30 pm (local time) and tickets had a general price of €38, plus a limited number of €30 tickets for students and children. Held at an ambient temperature of 27 °C, most of the material featured on the album was taken from the 12th. MTV executives wanted to maintain the tradition of the series' intimate atmosphere, so it wasn't supposed to be a big rock show. The goal was for both the musicians and the audience to remain seated, and for the true focus of the concert to be the music. However, Meine commented that it was impossible to keep the audience in their seats, as they were "crazy", and stated that "it was a fantastic setting". For the recording days, the theater's capacity was reduced to three thousand people, although it was still a considerable number for an event of this type. For the concert on 14 September, the band played to the full capacity of eight thousand spectators. (Note: This difference was because on the first two days, seats were arranged for all the audience, including the area in front of the stage. For the last day, people in that section were standing.) The production of both the audio and audiovisual recording was handled by the Swedes Mikael Andersson and Martin Hansen, while Mats Lindorfs performed the audio mastering at Cutting Room Studios in Stockholm, Sweden. Sven Offen was responsible for directing the audiovisual recording, with Jörg Jungwrirth as production representative.

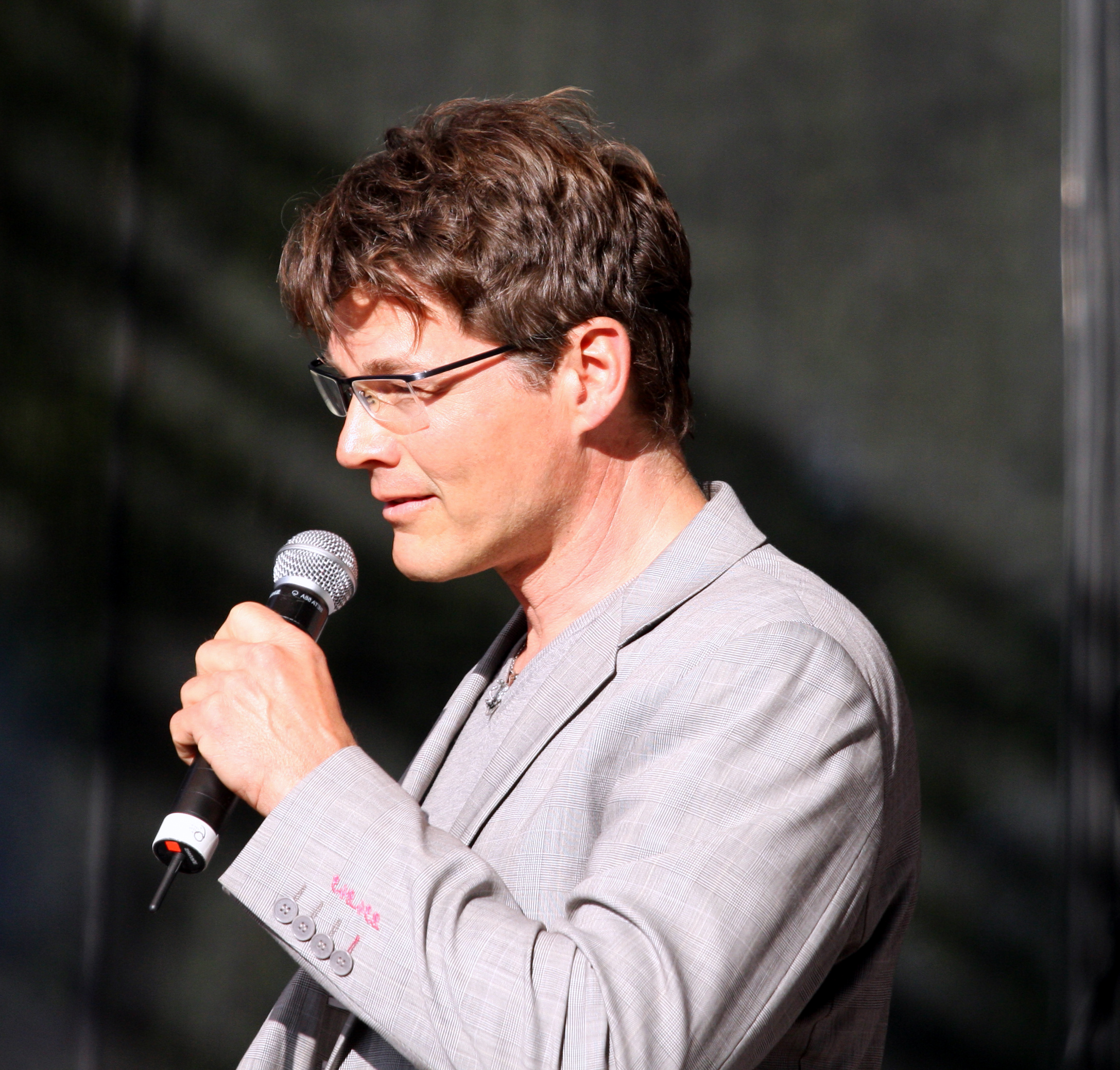
Morten Harket was one of the three guest vocalists.

The band was supported by several musicians on stage, including Mikael Andersson, who played guitar, mandolin, slide guitar, Weissenborn guitar and backing vocals, and Martin Hansen, who handled guitar, piano, harmonica and backing vocals. Additionally, guests included Ola Hjelm (guitar and backing vocals), Pitti Hecht (percussion and backing vocals), Ingo Powitzer (guitar and baritone guitar) and Hans Gardemar (accordion, piano and backing vocals), as well as a string section called Strings for Heaven, comprising violinists Irina Shalenkova, Elena Shalenkova and Ewa Moszynska, cellists Alexandros Botinis and Marcela Bassiou-Bineri, and violists Lilia Giousoupova and George Gaitanos. (Note: Hecht had previously worked with Scorpions on the album Pure Instinct (1996).) Furthermore, for the song "Born to Touch Your Feelings", they featured the Greek actress Dimitra Kokkori, who recites the final poem of the track.

For certain songs, Scorpions considered having special guests, such as friends, acquaintances or contemporary artists connected to the world of hard rock and heavy metal. Although there were no official proposals, in later interviews Meine and Schenker mentioned they had thought of musicians like Steven Tyler, David Coverdale, Jon Bon Jovi, Alice Cooper, Slash, Richie Sambora or Lemmy Kilmister. However, since MTV Germany was in charge, the channel's executives demanded the inclusion of local emerging artists to take advantage of the project and serve as a showcase for them. For this reason, singer Cäthe appeared on "In Trance", while Revolverheld vocalist Johannes Strate appeared on "Rock You Like a Hurricane". Regarding the latter, Schenker recounted that they had met him half a year earlier in a Russian city, when their manager contacted them because Strate wanted to attend one of their concerts, so they gave him some passes and ended up talking with him backstage. Meanwhile, A-ha vocalist Morten Harket sang on "Wind of Change". All three vocalists performed the respective songs as duets with Meine.

== Composition ==
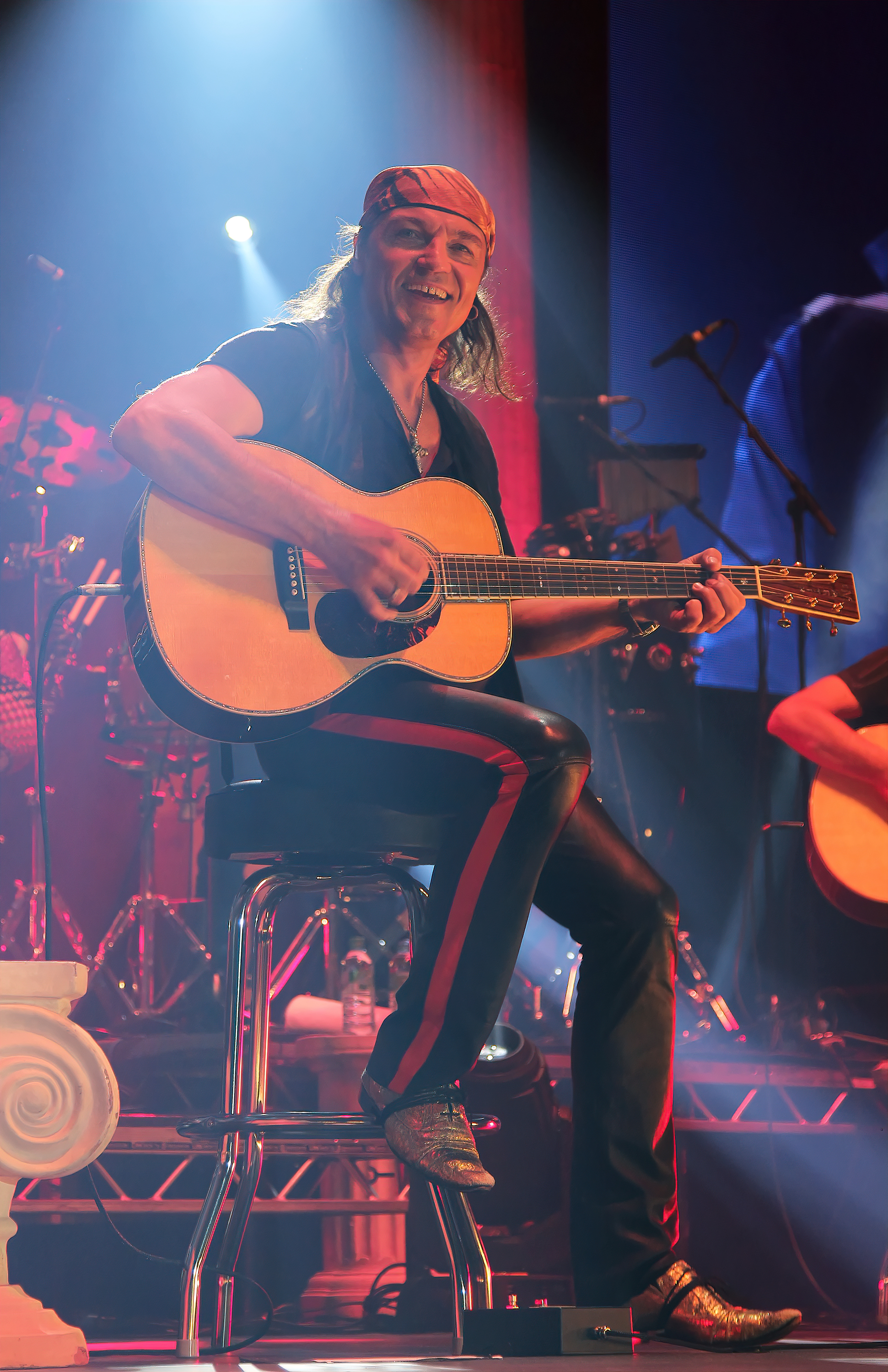
Matthias Jabs, along with the producers, was in charge of arranging the songs.

After reaching an agreement with MTV, the band had six months to prepare the concert. Firstly, the members wrote a list of the songs they wanted to perform, focusing on those they had never played live, but they also planned to create exclusive compositions. With this idea in mind, they initially did not want to include their biggest hits, like "Wind of Change" or "Rock You Like a Hurricane", since they had already been worked on for the 2001 album Acoustica, although they eventually added them at the insistence of the executives. According to Schenker, MTV told them: "No, they are very important songs and you have to put them on the album." In turn, the channel asked them to include covers of other artists, but the band rejected the idea after realizing, upon trying some, that they didn't work with the rest of the material. Aiming for a dynamic show, they avoided having too many slow songs, so they decided to arrange several rockers. Among them, they added some they had never considered playing with acoustic guitars, such as the metal songs "Blackout" and "Hit Between the Eyes".

In late February 2013, guitarist Matthias Jabs traveled to Stockholm to meet with the producers, and the three of them selected the songs that would be part of the event. Over a week they arranged eight tracks together with the Swedish musician Hans Gardemar, a process that "was easy, but for some of the songs that everyone knows, it represented a much bigger challenge," according to Jabs. To achieve a "bigger sound", the arrangements were designed to have five guitars tuned in different keys, including open tunings and the use of capos. For this reason, they had fifty-six guitars on stage. At first, they thought of creating an octet, a musical group of eight musicians, but for some songs they ended up with arrangements for eighteen people, for instruments like harp, mandolin, accordion, piano or harmonica. After a week in Stockholm, the producers and Jabs traveled to Germany to present the arrangements to Meine and Schenker, so they could hear them and determine what they liked or what needed modification. In total, during the preparation process, they reworked between thirty and forty songs, but for the production they chose twenty-five.

The incorporation of new instruments allowed them to change the sound, tempo and musical genre of certain songs. In fact, Meine noted that some ended up with a country or western feel. For the string section arrangements, they were inspired by Led Zeppelin's "Kashmir", aiming for a Middle Eastern sound, audible in "In Trance" and "Speedy's Coming". In the latter, they also changed part of the lyrics. The opening track, "Sting in the Tail", from the 2010 album of the same name, is arranged in a Cajun style, and features mandolin picking and a handclap rhythm that enhances the guitar riff, bringing it closer to Americana. "Wind of Change" had a more simplified change, with the band primarily playing it with rhythm guitar, piano and accordion. Jabs stated he wasn't sure about incorporating the accordion into the arrangements, but once Gardemar brought it along and they improvised a tango with two guitars on "Still Loving You", they were overwhelmed by the performance. Meanwhile, the mandolin was the star in "Hit Between the Eyes" and "Rock You Like a Hurricane", giving them a Greek touch; about the latter, Meine noted: "Now it feels like a Greek song." In contrast, the band had to omit the guitar solos in "No One Like You", both the intro and the main one, as Jabs couldn't transcribe the electric guitar fills to acoustic. To solve this, they created a "melodic thing" with the rhythm guitar and mandolin.

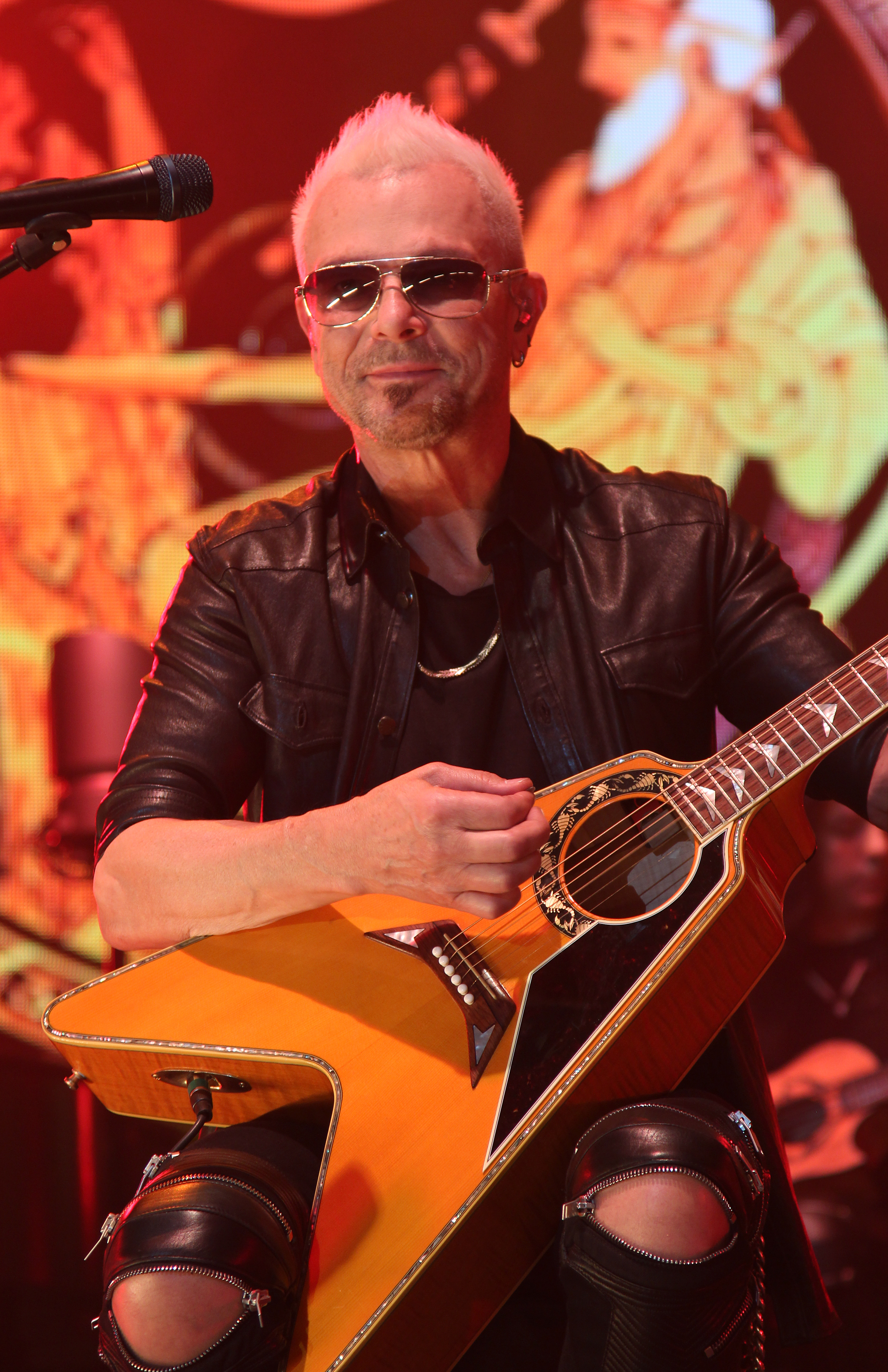
Rudolf Schenker at one of the acoustic concerts held in Germany in 2014.

The production includes four songs that had never been performed live before: "Born to Touch Your Feelings", "When You Came Into My Life", "Where the River Flows" and "Passion Rules the Game". The first was a choice by Schenker, as he felt it had "so much soul and so much heart" to be on the album. With the accordion as the lead, the arrangements brought such emotion that the actress reciting the poem ended up crying on stage during the conclusion. Jabs explained that having several backing vocalists, like Andersson, Hansen and Hjelm, helped include "Passion Rules the Game", as they hadn't performed it before because the lead vocal overlapped in the chorus. The harmonica was the new feature in "Where the River Flows", while the sitar was featured in "When You Came into My Life". Schenker noted that, since he composed it with Meine and the Indonesian musicians Titiek Puspa and James F. Sundah, it had a "very Asian flavor". For that reason, he replaced the twelve-string guitar with the sitar, although it wasn't easy for him to learn to play it.

"Rock and Roll Band" and "Dancing with the Moonlight" are two new tracks that came from a 2011 project called Outtakes, which consisted of recovering unfinished songs written in the eighties for a future album. Although the idea didn't prosper due to the farewell tour, the band chose to add these two, but first modified the lyrics. After Meine learned from the producers that Schenker had a new composition, the idea arose for him and both guitarists to have the opportunity to perform a track as soloists. "Love is the Answer" is a piano ballad that Schenker wrote while traveling on the Trans-Siberian Railway during one of the tours in Russia. At that time he only had the melody, but later added the lyrics and recorded a demo to show his bandmates. Meine encouraged him to sing it, something he hadn't done for years. Jabs, for his part, came up with "Delicate Dance", a psychedelic glam and boogie woogie-folk instrumental piece, which he composed while in Stockholm. Its inclusion was more of a suggestion from Meine, as the concert would last over two hours, he proposed adding it to give his voice a rest for a moment. Finally, the vocalist presented "Follow Your Heart", which he performed live playing the acoustic guitar himself; in fact, this was the first time in Scorpions' history that Meine sang without his bandmates on stage.

== Release and reissues ==
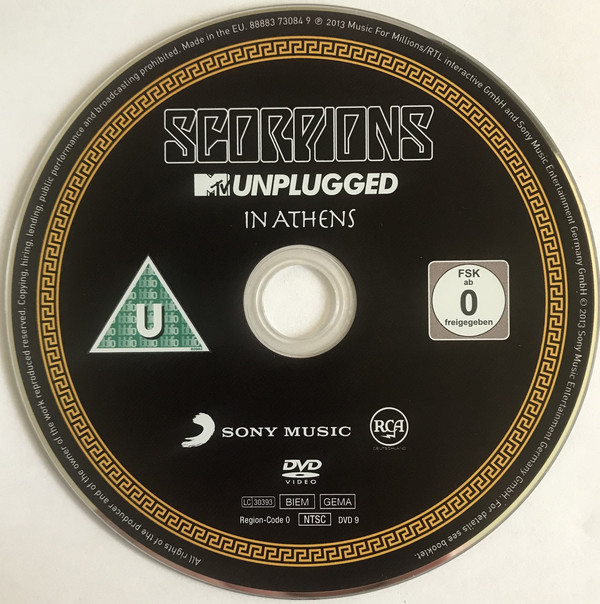
The concert was also released on DVD.

MTV Unplugged – Live in Athens was released on 29 November 2013 in fifty countries through Sony Music. (Note: Klaus Meine mentioned that the concert was broadcast by MTV in thirty countries, while in the United States it aired on VH1.) Depending on the market, it was released in different physical formats; for example, the European audio version features twenty-four tracks spread over two CDs or on three LPs. Additionally, in that continent a deluxe edition was also released containing a studio version of "Where the River Flows" as a bonus track, sung as a duet with the German artist Ina Müller.

On 2 December 2013, Sony, through its subsidiary RCA Deutschland, released a deluxe 1CD+DVD edition. Due to storage capacity, the compact disc only featured sixteen tracks, excluding "Pictured Life", "Speedy's Coming", "Born to Touch Your Feelings", "The Best Is Yet to Come", "In Trance", "When You Came Into My Life", "Passion Rules The Game" and "Hit Between the Eyes". The DVD, meanwhile, included the entire live show, including the drum and percussion solo called "Drum-Athenica/Pitti vs. James". Also in 2013, the audiovisual edition was released on both DVD and Blu-ray, which included exclusive behind-the-scenes footage about the making of the event.

On 11 December 2013, RCA Records released it as a double compact disc in Japan, while on 21 January 2014 it was released in the United States in CD and CD+DVD formats. On 11 April 2014, an album titled MTV Unplugged: The Studio Edits was uploaded to digital streaming platforms, consisting of ten songs in their studio versions. Three days later, the Tour Edition appeared on the European market, containing the live show spread over two compact discs, the DVD with the full show and the documentary, plus a third disc with the studio edits.

== Promotion ==
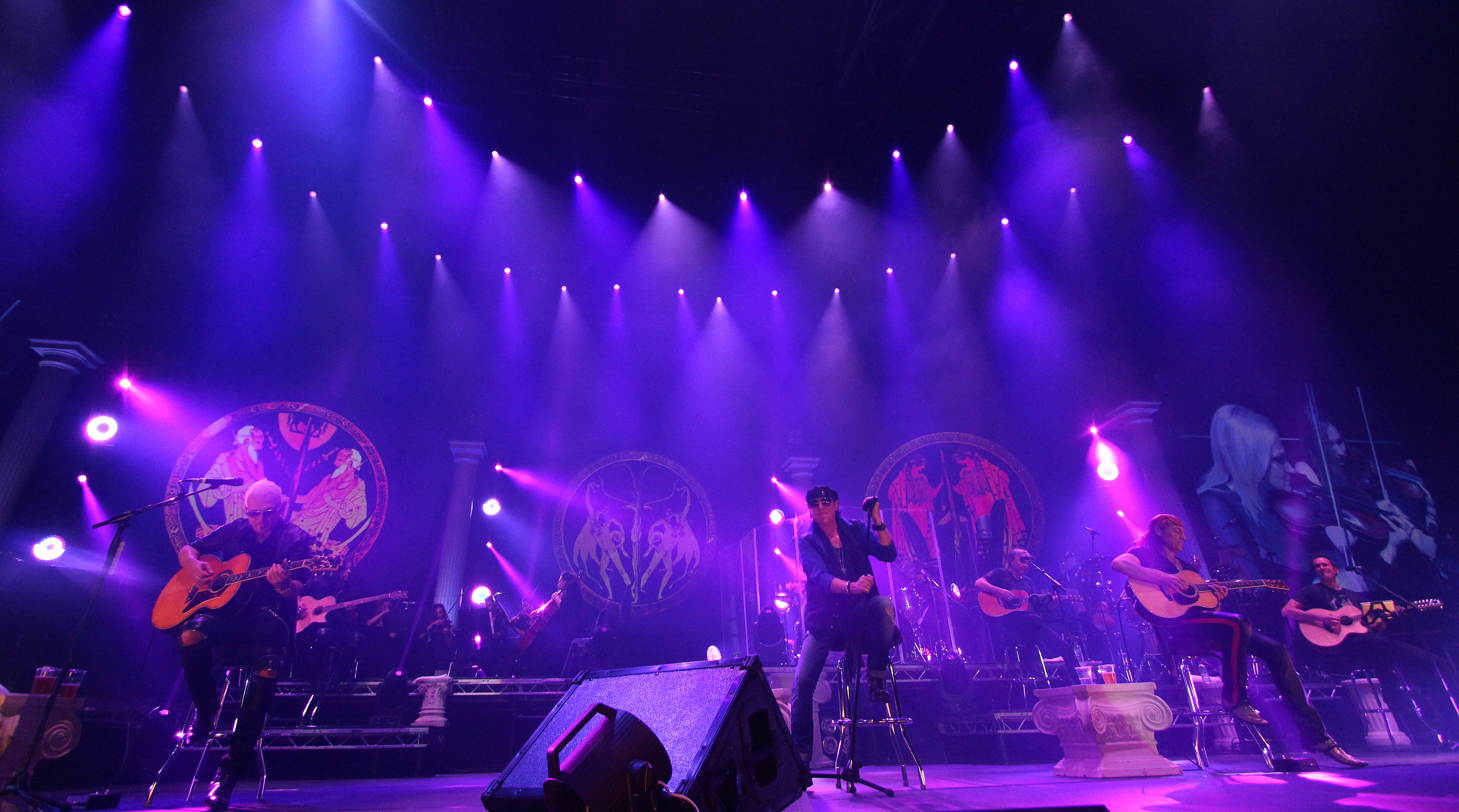
Scorpions performed the acoustic concert in five German cities in 2014. Pictured is the band at one of these events.

Although no single from MTV Unplugged – Live in Athens appears in the discography section of the Scorpions official website, Sony released three songs as promotional singles, which were available in certain markets. On 14 February 2014, "Rock You Like a Hurricane ft. Johannes Strate" was released via digital download in some European countries. In 2024, Promusicae certified this version gold, after selling more than 30,000 units in Spain. In Germany, the studio edit of "Passion Rules the Game" was made available to radio stations, while in France it was the live version of "Still Loving You". Likewise, in the days following the album's release, live videos for "Dancing with the Moonlight", "Where the River Flows", "Passion Rules the Game" and "Rock You Like a Hurricane" were published on YouTube, although the latter featured brief footage from the making-of.

Due to the album's success in Germany, in 2014, during the final leg of the Get Your Sting and Blackout tour called Rock N' Roll Forever Tour, the band performed the live concert in Kempten (28 April), Munich (29 April), Cologne (1 May), Hamburg (2 May) and Stuttgart (4 May). At all these shows, they were supported by musicians Martin Hansen, Mikael Andersson, Ola Hjelm, Hans Gardemar and Pitti Hecht. Johan Franzon covered the position of drummer James Kottak, after the latter was arrested in Dubai in April.

== Reception ==
=== Critical reception ===
Professional ratings
Review scores
Source	Rating
AntiMusic	5/5 stars
Classic Rock Revisited	A−
Forces Parallèles	3/5 stars
Ultimate Guitar	8/10

MTV Unplugged – Live in Athens received mostly positive reviews from the music press. Gregory Heany of AllMusic stated that the set feels "quite personal" despite being recorded in a large venue, as the songs reveal emotions and, in the case of the power ballads, a "new level of simplicity". He concluded his review by saying: "With two discs of acoustic goodness, Scorpions fans will definitely want to give this a listen." Kevin Wierzbicki of AntiMusic gave it a rating of five out of five stars, highlighting the band's "flexibility" in adding new elements to the songs, the guest vocalists, Schenker and Jabs' skill on acoustic guitar, Meine's "patented" voice, and the "playful rhythm" of Kottak and Paweł Mąciwoda. He added, "Scorpions have released many live efforts but none until now have been free of bombast" because "there is much more here than you'd get if the same set had been played through a stack of Marshalls." Jeb Wright of Classic Rock Revisited praised the arrangements, the musicians' performances, the guest artists, and the work of Jabs and Schenker. He also expressed that Meine was the "man who steals the show", as his "voice is unique and still going strong" and "he carries himself with a confident presence." Regarding the songs, he called "Dancing with the Moonlight" "impressive", highlighted the duet on "In Trance", and noted the "new personality" of "Passion Rules the Game". In closing, he commented that the album "shows a band taking risks but doing so with the self-confidence and the passion necessary to make it a huge success." Chris Franzkowiak of the German edition of Classic Rock described the arrangements as tasteful and considered the biggest surprise to be the ballad "Love is the Answer". However, he felt that Strate's "rather indifferent" performance on "Rock You Like a Hurricane" detracted a point.

Mark Uricheck of the American magazine Elmore Magazine noted that the album's strength lies in the "custom-tailored modifications" of the songs and it is a "sensuous achievement in terms of arrangement". He also distinguished the duet between Meine and Harket on "Wind of Change", as well as that of Meine with Cäthe on "In Trance", as the latter "roars with a somber, orchestral intensity". In turn, he highlighted Gardemar's performance and the folk accents on "When the Smoke Is Going Down", the ballad "Love is the Answer", and "Rock You Like a Hurricane", as it "resonates with a Wagnerian air of classical inspiration". Chris McHugh of the American Pittsburgh Music Magazine wrote that the arrangements are "dynamic and robust" and every visual and auditory detail makes the show worth watching. He also reviewed that the sound is full and rich, the quality is exceptional, and the music is perfect, as they "stay true to the spirit and energy of Scorpions". Overall, he reflected that "it's an entertaining set, although a bit more laid back and calm compared to the band's earlier catalog", but it is "a must-have for any die-hard Scorpions fan". Canadian critic Martin Popoff declared it an "elaborate and interesting acoustic recording", where the band "sets up various arrangements that lighten the tempo of many of their hits". About the show itself, he added that it is "captured with much splendor".

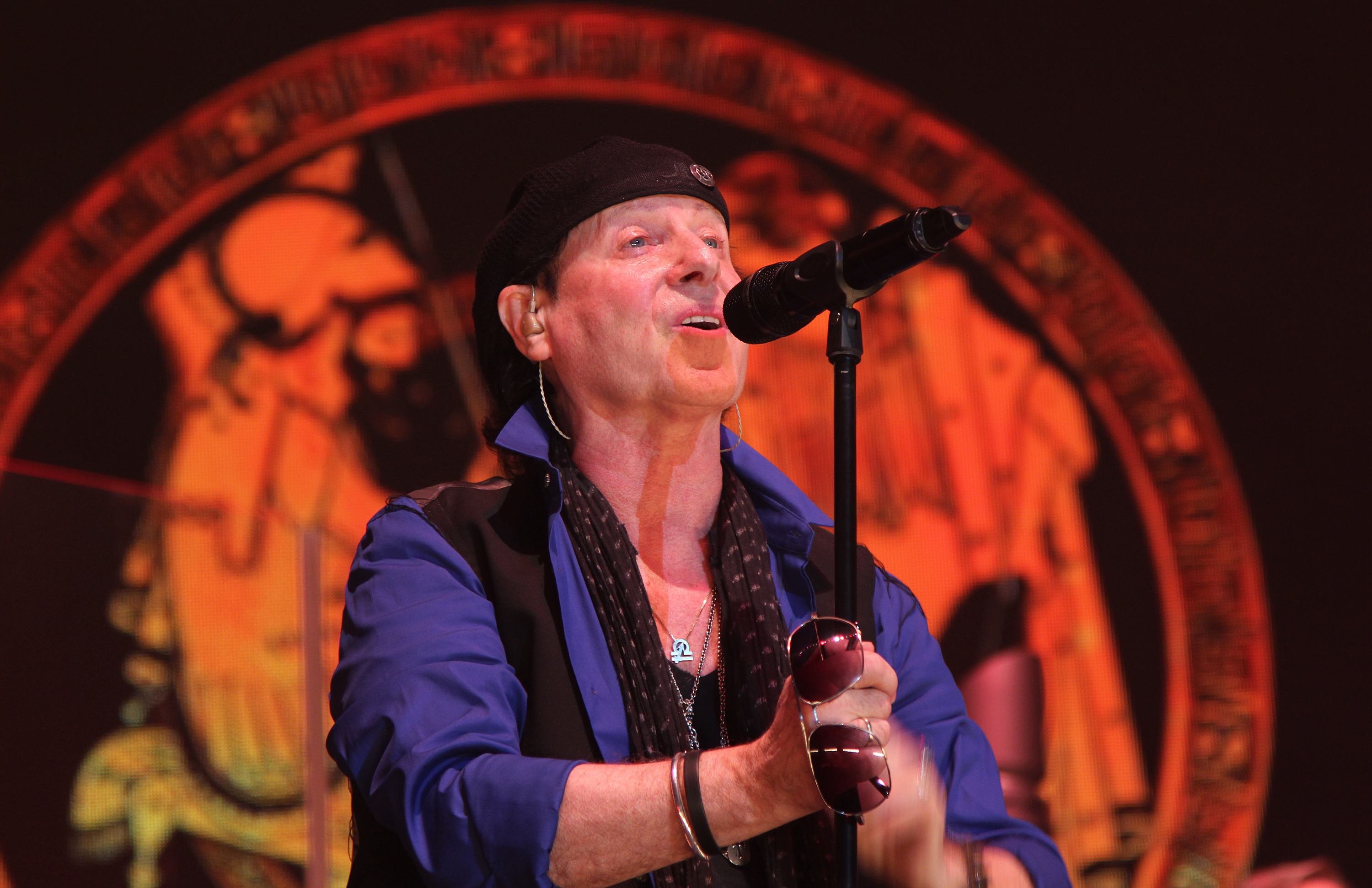
Klaus Meine's vocal quality was one of the aspects most praised by critics.

Alexander Kolbe of the German magazine Rocks commented that the execution is "exciting", even more so than on 2001's Acoustica. He highlighted the "variable instrumentation and the modified arrangements" that, in certain songs, venture into worldbeat, such as the Cajun-Greek folk blend on "Sting in the Tail", the Indian ambiance on "When You Came Into My Life", or the Far Eastern touch on "Passion Rules the Game". He also opined that Meine's performance "is magnificent again", although he noted that "Love is the Answer" is a "bad moment", mainly due to Schenker's vocal intonation. Matt Wardlaw of Ultimate Classic Rock stated there is a variety of instrumentation that makes the reworked material feel "intimate", but according to the author, the most interesting thing is that the band delves into their song catalog to present "unexpected surprises". In summary, Wardlaw commented that they "deliver a performance that has a pretty satisfying touch." The team at Ultimate Guitar opined that the addition of a string section gives new depth to the songs, especially on "Blackout". In turn, they stated that Meine's voice is still admirable and the band creatively renews some of their hits, giving them something extra to keep them sounding interesting. The review concluded: "No matter which side you look at it from, MTV Unplugged is an outstanding work that any rock fan should at least pay attention to." The German television channel VOX named it "another highlight in the repertoire of an extraordinary band". They also observed that both the rockers and the power ballads, regardless of their reworkings, did not lose their class, as "the melodies have a timeless compositional appeal".

However, the album also received more mixed reviews from some outlets. For example, Guillaume Gaguet of the French site Forces Parallèles considered the arrangements "innovative", but in some songs they are not really convincing, like the string section on "Blackout" and "Hit Between the Eyes". Although some dissatisfactions reduced the album's impact, such as the presence of the guest vocalists and the disappointment of some moments due to the multiplicity of interlocutors, he stated that Scorpions' great merit is that they "respect the original spirit of the songs and offer them new, very flattering adornments." Kai Butterweck of the German online magazine Laut.de commented that the band created a "coherent and warm sound package", with danceable atmospheres on "Pictured Life" or a slight nod to Mediterranean music on "Can't Live Without You" and "Born to Touch Your Feelings". Regarding the guest singers, he highlighted the "unusual tension" between Cäthe's raspy voice and Meine's on "In Trance", but criticized the "unintentional role of an insecure karaoke singer" by Strate on "Rock You Like a Hurricane" and the "melodious, clumsy and lifeless verses" by Harket on "Wind of Change", where Meine "tries to limit the damage with fervently pronounced pathos". As for the new compositions, Butterweck noted that only "Dancing with the Moonlight" and "Delicate Dance" would cause a sensation outside the band's fan club. While he considered the set attractive, there are "quite ambivalent" interpretations.

On the other hand, thanks to this production, the band received two nominations at the German Echo Awards in the categories of Best National Rock/Alternative Group and Best Music DVD.

=== Commercial reception ===
Album

Upon its release, the material achieved moderate positions on major music charts worldwide. On 13 December 2013, it debuted at number nine on the German Media Control Charts, and the following week reached number five as its peak position. In total, it spent twenty-two weeks on the chart, with its last appearance on 6 June 2014 at position 98. It ended 2013 as the seventy-fourth best-selling album of the year. On the German chart compiled by Billboard, it also reached number five, but only stayed for three weeks. In the same year, the Bundesverband Musikindustrie (BVMI) certified the audio version gold, for selling over 100,000 copies. In 2016, the DVD also achieved gold certification for surpassing 25,000 units.

In Greece, it reached number 8 on Billboard Greece Albums for the week of 17 May 2014. In other European countries, MTV Unplugged – Live in Athens reached position 29 on the Swiss Hitparade, 37 on the Austrian Ö3 Austria Top 40, 50 on the Spanish Top 100 Álbumes, 90 on the Ultratop chart in Wallonia, Belgium, and 195 in Flanders, Belgium. In France, it reached number 85 on the French Albums Chart. As of 2018, the French company InfoDisc estimated its sales at 14,100 units, without considering streaming. In South Korea, it placed at number 61 on the Circle Chart.

On 8 February 2014, it entered the US Billboard 200 at number 113 and stayed for only one week. On that date, it reached the same position on the Top Album Sales chart. On other Billboard charts, it reached number 7 on Top Hard Rock Albums, number 27 on Independent Albums, number 41 on both Top Rock Albums and Top Rock & Alternative Albums, and number 106 on Top Current Album Sales.

DVD

Regarding the audiovisual release, for the week of 15 December 2013 it reached number 9 on the Swiss Musik DVD Charts Top 10. In Spain, on 2 December 2013 it debuted at number fifteen on the Top 20 DVD Musical, and in 2014 it re-entered on two occasions: on 5 May at number 17 and on 6 June at number 20. By 16 June, it had reached number thirteen as its peak position. In the United Kingdom, it held the number 41 spot on the UK Music Video Chart for 14 December 2013, while in Sweden it placed at number 16. In France, it ended 2013 as the thirty-third best-selling DVD with 3,600 copies, while the following year it finished in seventy-first place with 2,100 units.

== Track listing ==
Audio version; disc one
No.	Title	Writer(s)	Length
1.	"Sting in the Tail"	Rudolf Schenker, Klaus Meine	4:38
2.	"Can't Live Without You"	Schenker, Meine	3:53
3.	"Pictured Life"	Schenker, Meine, Uli Jon Roth	3:56
4.	"Speedy's Coming"	Schenker, Meine	4:16
5.	"Born to Touch Your Feelings"	Schenker, Meine	6:14
6.	"The Best Is Yet to Come"	Schenker, Eric Bazilian, Fredrik Thomander, Anders Wikström	5:03
7.	"Dancing with the Moonlight"	Meine, Matthias Jabs	3:58
8.	"In Trance" (duet with Cäthe)	Schenker, Meine	4:34
9.	"When You Came into My Life"	Schenker, Meine, Titiek Puspa, James F. Sundah	5:04
10.	"Delicate Dance"	Jabs	5:10
11.	"Love is the Answer"	Schenker	4:30
12.	"Follow Your Heart"	Meine	2:45

Audio version; disc two
No.	Title	Writer(s)	Length
13.	"Send Me an Angel"	Schenker, Meine	3:57
14.	"Where the River Flows"	Schenker, Meine	3:58
15.	"Passion Rules the Game"	Meine, Herman Rarebell	5:45
16.	"Rock You Like a Hurricane" (duet with Johannes Strate)	Schenker, Meine, Rarebell	4:58
17.	"Hit Between the Eyes"	Schenker, Meine, Rarebell, Jim Vallance	4:45
18.	"Rock 'n' Roll Band"	Meine	4:32
19.	"Blackout"	Schenker, Meine, Rarebell, Sonja Kittelsen	4:57
20.	"Still Loving You"	Schenker, Meine	3:42
21.	"Big City Nights"	Schenker, Meine	4:31
22.	"Wind of Change" (duet with Morten Harket)	Meine	5:31
23.	"No One Like You"	Schenker, Meine	4:39
24.	"When the Smoke Is Going Down"	Schenker, Meine	3:43
Total length:			1:49:08

DVD and Blu-ray versions
No.	Title	Writer(s)	Length
1.	"Sting in the Tail"	Schenker, Meine	4:38
2.	"Can't Live Without You"	Schenker, Meine	3:53
3.	"Pictured Life"	Schenker, Meine, Roth	3:56
4.	"Speedy's Coming"	Schenker, Meine	4:16
5.	"Born to Touch Your Feelings"	Schenker, Meine	6:14
6.	"The Best Is Yet to Come"	Schenker, Meine, Thomander, Wikström	5:03
7.	"Dancing with the Moonlight"	Meine, Jabs	3:58
8.	"In Trance" (duet with Cäthe)	Schenker, Meine	4:34
9.	"When You Came into My Life"	Schenker, Meine, Puspa, Sundah	5:04
10.	"Delicate Dance"	Jabs	5:10
11.	"Love is the Answer"	Schenker	4:30
12.	"Follow Your Heart"	Meine	2:45
13.	"Send Me an Angel"	Schenker, Meine	3:57
14.	"Where the River Flows"	Schenker, Meine	3:58
15.	"Passion Rules the Game"	Meine, Rarebell	5:45
16.	"Rock You Like a Hurricane" (duet with Johannes Strate)	Schenker, Meine, Rarebell	4:58
17.	"Hit Between the Eyes"	Schenker, Meine, Rarebell, Vallance	4:45
18.	"Drum-Athenica Pitti vs James" (drum and percussion solo)		5:42
19.	"Rock 'n' Roll Band"	Meine	4:32
20.	"Blackout"	Schenker, Meine, Rarebell, Kittelsen	4:57
21.	"Still Loving You"	Schenker, Meine	3:42
22.	"Big City Nights"	Schenker, Meine	4:31
23.	"Wind of Change" (duet with Morten Harket)	Meine	5:31
24.	"No One Like You"	Schenker, Meine	4:39
25.	"When the Smoke Is Going Down"	Schenker, Meine	3:43
26.	"Scorpions plus guest – Making-of documentary"		41:41

MTV Unplugged – The Studio Edits
No.	Title	Writer(s)	Length
1.	"Dancing with the Moonlight"	Meine, Jabs	3:29
2.	"Rock You Like a Hurricane" (duet with Johannes Strate)	Schenker, Meine, Rarebell	3:56
3.	"Where the River Flows" (duet with Ina Müller)	Schenker, Meine	3:55
4.	"In Trance" (duet with Cäthe)	Schenker, Meine	3:51
5.	"Born to Touch Your Feelings"	Schenker, Meine	4:02
6.	"Passion Rules the Game"	Meine, Rarebell	4:02
7.	"When You Came into My Life"	Schenker, Meine, Puspa, Sundah	3:32
8.	"Rock You Like a Hurricane"	Schenker, Meine, Rarebell	3:56
9.	"Where the River Flows"	Schenker, Meine	3:55
10.	"In Trance"	Schenker, Meine	3:51

== Charts ==
=== Weekly charts (CD) ===
Chart (2013–2014)	Peak position
Austrian Albums (Ö3 Austria)	37
Belgian Albums (Ultratop Flanders)	195
Belgian Albums (Ultratop Wallonia)	90
French Albums (SNEP)	85
German Albums (Offizielle Top 100)	5
Greek Albums (Billboard Greece)	8
Russian Albums (2M Charts)	9
South Korean Albums (Circle)	61
Spanish Albums (Promusicae)	50
Swiss Albums (Schweizer Hitparade)	29
US Billboard 200	113
US Top Hard Rock Albums (Billboard)	7
US Independent Albums (Billboard)	27
US Top Rock Albums (Billboard)	41
US Top Album Sales (Billboard)	113
US Top Current Album Sales (Billboard)	106
US Top Rock & Alternative Albums (Billboard)	41

Chart (2015)	Peak position
Belgian Albums (Ultratop Wallonia)	187

=== Year-end charts (CD) ===
Chart (2013)	Position
German Albums (Offizielle Top 100)	74

=== Weekly charts (DVD) ===
Chart (2013–2014)	Peak position
French Music DVD (SNEP)	10
Spanish Music DVD (PROMUSICAE)	13
Swedish Music DVD (Sverigetopplistan)	16
Swiss Music DVD (Swiss Hitparade)	9
UK Music Video (OCC)	41

=== Year-end charts (DVD) ===
Chart (2013)	Position
French Music DVD (SNEP)	33

Chart (2014)	Position
French Music DVD (SNEP)	71

Chart (2019)	Position
Portuguese Music DVD (AFP)	33

Chart (2020)	Position
Portuguese Music DVD (AFP)	19

Chart (2022)	Position
Portuguese Music DVD (AFP)	43

== Certifications ==
CD

Region	Certification	Certified units/sales
Germany (BVMI)	Gold	100,000^{^}
^{^} Shipments figures based on certification alone.

DVD

Region	Certification	Certified units/sales
Germany (BVMI)	Gold	25,000^{^}
^{^} Shipments figures based on certification alone.

== Personnel ==
=== Musicians ===
Scorpions

- Klaus Meine – vocals, acoustic guitar on "Follow Your Heart"
- Rudolf Schenker – acoustic guitar, sitar, vocals on "Love is the Answer"
- Matthias Jabs – guitar
- Paweł Mąciwoda – bass
- James Kottak – drums

Accompanying musicians

- Mikael Andersson – guitar, mandolin, slide guitar, Weissenborn guitar, backing vocals
- Martin Hansen – guitar, harmonica, piano, backing vocals
- Ola Hjelm – guitar, backing vocals
- Hans Gardemar – accordion, piano, backing vocals
- Ingo Powitzer – guitar, baritone guitar
- Pitti Hecht – percussion, backing vocals
- Dimitra Kokkori – recitation on "Born to Touch Your Feelings"

Guest vocalists

- Cäthe – vocals on "In Trance"
- Johannes Strate – vocals on "Rock You Like a Hurricane"
- Morten Harket – vocals on "Wind of Change"
- Ina Müller – vocals on studio version of "Where the River Flows"

The Strings from Heaven (string section)

- Irina Shalenkova – violin (leader)
- Elena Shalenkova, Ewa Moszynska – violin
- George Gaitanos, Lilia Giousoupova – viola
- Alexandros Botinis, Marcela Bassiou-Bineri – cello

=== Production ===
- Mikael Andersson, Martin Hansen – production
- Mats Lindorfs – mastering
- Sven Offen – direction (video)
- Jörg Jungwrirth – production representative (video)

Source: MTV Unplugged – Live in Athens (Tour Edition) liner notes.

== Bibliography ==
- Popoff, Martin (2016). Wind of Change – The Scorpions Story. Wymer Publishing. ISBN 978-1-9087244-0-3.
