= Scorpions Revisited =

Studio album by Uli Jon Roth
- Released: 10 February 2015
- Recorded: 2014 Hannover, Germany
- Genre: Hard rock
- Label: Warner / UDR Music

Uli Jon Roth chronology
Under a Dark Sky (2008)	Scorpions Revisited (2015)	Tokyo Tapes Revisited - Live in Japan (2016)

Scorpions Revisited is a studio album by Uli Jon Roth released on 9 February 2015. The guitarist revisited his personal favourites from the early Scorpions period. The album was produced by German producer Sascha Paeth.

== Track listing ==
No.	Title	Music	Length
1.	"The Sails of Charon" (Taken by Force, 1977)	Uli Jon Roth	8:50
2.	"Longing For Fire" (In Trance, 1975)	Rudolf Schenker / Roth	2:50
3.	"Crying Days" (Virgin Killer, 1976)	Schenker / Klaus Meine	5:35
4.	"Virgin Killer" (Virgin Killer, 1976)	Roth	3:58
5.	"In Trance" (In Trance, 1975)	Schenker / Meine	6:44
6.	"Sun In My Hand" (In Trance, 1975)	Roth	4:48
7.	"Yellow Raven" (Virgin Killer, 1976)	Roth	4:50
8.	"Polar Nights" (Virgin Killer, 1976)	Roth	7:35
9.	"Dark Lady" (In Trance, 1975)	Roth	8:19
10.	"Catch Your Train" (Virgin Killer, 1976)	Schenker / Meine	3:16
11.	"Evening Wind" (In Trance, 1975)	Roth	5:39
12.	"All Night Long" (Tokyo Tapes, 1978)	Roth / Meine	3:11
13.	"We'll Burn The Sky" (Taken by Force, 1977)	Schenker / Monika Dannemann	8:33
14.	"Pictured Life" (Virgin Killer, 1976)	Roth / Schenker / Meine	3:12
15.	"Hell-Cat" (Virgin Killer, 1976)	Roth	3:00
16.	"Life's Like A River" (In Trance, 1975)	Roth / Schenker / Corina Fortmann	3:05
17.	"Drifting Sun" (Fly to the Rainbow, 1974)	Roth	6:40
18.	"Rainbow Dream Prelude"	Improvisation: Roth	4:00
19.	"Fly to the Rainbow" (Fly to the Rainbow, 1974)	Michael Schenker / Roth	11:36

== Musicians ==
- Uli Jon Roth - Lead guitar
- Nathan James - Vocals
- Liz Vandall - Vocals
- Jamie Little - Drums
- Ule W. Ritgen - Bass
- Niklas Turmann - Guitar, vocals
- Corvin Bahn - Keyboards, vocals
- David Klosinski - Guitar
