= Lyraka Volume 1 =

- Cover art by Ken Kelly

Studio album by Lyraka
- Released: November 02, 2010
- Genre: Wagnerian rock, rock opera, progressive metal, progressive rock classic metal.
- Producer: Andre Maquera, Andy DiGelsomina

Lyraka Volume 1 is the debut studio album from the Wagnerian opera metal project Lyraka. It was released on November 2, 2010.

== History ==
The Lyraka opera was first conceived by Jasmine Aliara in 2006. Her plans were for a multimedia fantasy experience: movie, website, video game, and a line of Ken Kelly artwork. Upon creating the characters and storyline for the original screenplay, she enlisted Andy DiGelsomina to begin writing music for the project. At first DiGelsomina's role was to score the script as a soundtrack, but as work progressed the project developed into a full blown metal opera. According to DiGelsomina's blog, "Lyraka as a musical project draws inspiration from the operas of The Who, King Diamond, and Richard Wagner, as well as the guitar hero stylings and concept albums of Uli Jon Roth."

== Characters ==
- Neires: The main character of the story, a young man that loves heavy metal and guitar.
- Lilliput: Queen of the desert land Errandia.
- Semmonet: Neires' father, the vizier of Lilliput.
- Empress Jasmine: Monarch of the underwater sovereign, Lyraka.
- Locke: Head of Lyraka's palace guard.
- Scatherus: The serpentine ruler of the abyss.

== The plot ==
The plot centers around the protagonist Neires, a rebellious metal head who finds an enchanted guitar and embarks upon a journey to find himself. The antagonists are Semmonet, Lilliput, and Scatherus. The Lyraka lyrics are influenced by the writings of Carl Jung, Friedrich Nietzsche, and Søren Kierkegaard, and are essentially allegorical.

=== Coronation ===
This song serves as an invitation to the opera, and coincidentally introduces a recurrent theme: the reinforcement of belief in an ideal via repetition, vivid imagery, and hyperbole. Through the use of these techniques, the protagonists of this song make the underwater empire of Lyraka seem to be a paradise, abstractly conceived and thus inherently imperfect.

Another primary theme introduced in the song is the dichotomy between the "world above" (Errandia, desert), and "below" (Lyraka, oceanic). These two landmarks are based upon archetypes that the psychoanalyst Carl Jung expanded upon. The ocean depths represent the inner depths of subjective experience, while the desert symbolizes the "real world", or how "others" see you. The desert also represents the place where one takes his or her dreams, in order to subject them to the harshness of reality and thereby submit to them to trial by fire. How the landmarks oppose, interact, and complement each other is a vital variable in the development of the Lyraka story.

The song features Graham Bonnet on vocals.

=== Scatherus ===
The opera character Scatherus is the anthropomorphic representation of despair, with lyrics influenced by both psychoanalyst Carl Jung's writings on the "shadow" portion of the psyche, as well as Saint Augustine's writings on the "felix culpa" and its relation to the Fall of Man. The lyrics refer to Scatherus as being an "entropic void", asserting that when the emptiness of despair is used as the quantitative measure of disorder in human experience, it reveals itself to be a vital, positive constant. This song features Veronica Freeman on vocals.

=== Beyond the Palace ===
This song features Graham Bonnet on vocals again, singing as the musical narrator. The song closes the album for good reason: following the despair and negativity in the suite "Scatherus-Errandia-Neires", "Beyond the Palace" attempts a reaffirmation of the starry-eyed ideals introduced earlier in the album, by both "Coronation" and "Palace Guard". The song is the most repetitive of the set, because mindful reinforcement can be required to continue belief in lofty ideals. Nietzsche's concept of self-overcoming is manifest in the lyrics "(by) knowing that it had to happen, you redeem your past". There are instances of irony in the track as well, most evidenced when Bonnet sings "ascend beyond the rainbow, all your fears are through", his voice cracking on "through".

== Reception ==
Professional ratings
Review scores
| Source | Rating |
|---|---|
| Martin Popoff | 8/10 stars |
| Metal Rules | 4/5 stars |
| Classic Rock | 7/10 stars |

Critic and author Martin Popoff was very complimentary toward the album, calling it a "strangely irresistible yet measured flood of fresh, catchy, creative, NWOBHM-ish ideas that draw you to the conclusion that with a pile of work, this is the next Led Zeppelin." Peter Makowski of Classic Rock writes that "the whole concept screams box office disaster, but somehow it works" and "at its best" the album " sounds like a tasty hybrid of Dio circa Rainbow, Iron Maiden, and early Metallica with a touch of Manowar." Metal Rules highly recommends the album, with the review highlighting the unusual composition of the songs and the use of a 1970s sound "blended with some Power Metal and (...) lots of instrumentation, orchestrations and long arrangements."

== Track listing ==
All music and lyrics composed by Andy DiGelsomina

1. "Coronation" - 5:10
2. "Palace Guard" - 7:43
3. "Scatherus" - 3:54
4. "Errandia" - 12:32
5. "Neires" - 5:21
6. "Beyond the Palace" - 6:13

== Personnel ==
- Andy DiGelsomina - Electric Lead Guitar Solos, all Music and Lyric composition, Orchestration, Co-producer.
- Andre Maquera - Co-producer, Mastering, Engineering, Rhythm and Acoustic/Nylon-string Guitars.
- Jasmine Aliara - Opera Concept, Story, Characters
- Graham Bonnet - lead & backing vocals on "Coronation", "Palace Guard", "Errandia", and "Beyond the Palace".
- Thom Carvey - bass, saxophone
- Gary Spaulding - drums, percussion
- Hannah Beth Crary - Solo Violin
- Tommy Heart - lead & backing vocals on "Neires".
- Veronica Freeman - lead & backing vocals on "Scatherus".
- Jeff Pilson - Vocal Engineering for Veronica Freeman.
- Ken Kelly - Cover Art.
