= Legends of Rock at Castle Donington =

Legends of Rock: Live at Castle Donington

Live album by Uli Jon Roth
- Released: 7 November 2002
- Recorded: 23 June 2001; Castle Donington, Leicestershire, England
- Genres: Heavy metal, rock
- Label: Crown Japan

Uli Jon Roth chronology
The Electric Sun Years Vol. I & II (2000)	Legends of Rock: Live at Castle Donington (2002)	Metamorphosis of Vivaldi's Four Seasons (2003)

Legends of Rock: Live at Castle Donington is a DVD released by German guitarist Uli Jon Roth. It features Roth's headlining show at Castle Donington, Leicestershire, England in 2001, along with his special guests Michael Schenker, Phil Mogg, and Pete Way from UFO, and Jack Bruce from Cream. Released in 2002.

== Track listing ==
1. "Trail on the Wind" (intro) (Uli Jon Roth) 1:46
2. "Sky Overture" (Roth) 7:25
3. "Concierto d'Aranjuez" (Joaquín Rodrigo) 2:57
4. "The King Returns" (Roth) 3:10
5. "Let It Roll" (with UFO) (Phil Mogg, Michael Schenker) 4:23
6. "Rock Bottom" (with UFO) (Mogg, Schenker) 12:40
7. "Sunshine of Your Love" (with Jack Bruce) (Pete Brown, Jack Bruce, Eric Clapton) 6:42
8. "White Room" (with Jack Bruce) (Brown, Bruce) 6:50
9. "All Along the Watchtower" (Bob Dylan) 5:06
10. "Little Wing" (Jimi Hendrix) 4:43
11. "Doctor Doctor" (with UFO) (Mogg, Schenker) 6:56
12. "Fireworks Jam" (Roth) 13:45
13. "Atlantis" (outro/the title credits) (Roth) 2:39

bonus tracks

1. "Midnight Train" (with UFO) (Mogg, Schenker) 5:12
2. "Spoonful" (with Jack Bruce) (Willie Dixon) 10:16

== Musicians ==
- Uli Jon Roth: Guitar, vocals
- Don Airey: keyboards
- Clive Bunker: drums
- Barry Sparks: Bass, rhythm guitar
- Jack Bruce: Bass, vocals
- UFO:
  - Michael Schenker: Guitar
  - Phil Mogg: Vocals
  - Pete Way: Bass

== Controversy ==
"Roth appeared in concert at Castle Donington in 2001 with original Scorpions lead guitarist Michael Schenker, and critics noted the healthy appearance of Roth and his mastery of his material, but described Schenker as past his prime." from the Article on [Uli Roth].
