= Lonesome Crow =

Studio album by Scorpions
- Released: 9 February 1972
- Recorded: October 1971
- Studios: Star Studios (Hamburg, West Germany)
- Genres: Hard rock; psychedelic rock; krautrock
- Length: 40:37
- Label: Brain
- Producer: Conny Plank

Scorpions chronology
Lonesome Crow (1972)	Fly to the Rainbow (1974)

Michael Schenker chronology
Lonesome Crow (1972)	Phenomenon (1974)

Professional ratings
Review scores
Source	Rating
AllMusic	2/5 stars
Forces Paralleles	3/5 stars

Lonesome Crow is the debut studio album by the German rock band Scorpions. It was recorded soon after Scorpions became a fully professional band under the production of Conny Plank, apparently in only six or seven days, and released on 9 February 1972 in West Germany as the soundtrack to the German anti-drug movie Das Kalte Paradies (The Cold Paradise), and May 1973 in the United States. The album's style is darkly melodic, typical for early Scorpions but unlike their later work.

== Background ==
It is the band's only album with lead guitarist Michael Schenker – just 16 at the time of the recording – as a full-time member. He soon left to join UFO and was replaced by Ulrich Roth. Schenker would, however, rejoin briefly during the recording and touring of 1979's Lovedrive.

With Lonesome Crow, we were just a young band trying to find our way, trying to shape an artistic style to find the Scorpions DNA. There was a ballad with "In Search of the Peace of Mind", and a psychedelic rocker with the title track, "I’m Goin' Mad", [which] was a great rocker with Michael Schenker playing great solos. We were just a young band with talented guys, with no idea on where to go from here. For the subsequent album, Fly to the Rainbow, we brought in Uli Roth, who had a Hendrix influence, and Rudolf and I became a songwriter team. When Matthias Jabs joined the band, we found our style, fast riffs but great melodies, along with the power ballads.

— Klaus Meine

Michael Schenker in later years has spoken bitterly about not getting his proper writing credit, with a blanket "all songs by Scorpions" when in his mind many of the songs were written by himself and Klaus alone. In particular Michael cites "In Search of the Peace of Mind" remaining, unjustly, in the Scorpions set list for years when it's in reality, his song. Apart from these occasional performances of "In Search of the Peace of Mind" up to 1978 and between 1996 and 2006, Scorpions have played no song from Lonesome Crow since the tour in support of their third album In Trance.

The songs "Action" and "I'm Goin' Mad" are re-recordings of the songs for their unreleased 1970 single on CCA label that were later released on the compilation Psychedelic Gems 2, making them the earliest released Scorpions recordings.

The album had several different sleeves and was re-titled Action for its initial release in Scandinavia, The Scorpions for one 1976 release, and The Original Scorpions, with a different running order, for a Japanese release in 1981 and its first-ever CD issue in 1986. The 1982 German reissue cover art was created by the artist Rodney Matthews.

== Track listing ==
All tracks are written by Scorpions (1972 Metronome Music).

Side one
No.	Title	Length
1.	"I'm Goin' Mad"	4:53
2.	"It All Depends"	3:30
3.	"Leave Me"	5:06
4.	"In Search of the Peace of Mind"	4:59

Side two
No.	Title	Length
5.	"Inheritance"	4:41
6.	"Action"	3:56
7.	"Lonesome Crow"	13:31

=== The Original Scorpions 1981 Japanese reissue ===
Side one
No.	Title	Length
1.	"Action"	3:56
2.	"It All Depends"	3:30
3.	"Lonesome Crow"	13:31

Side two
No.	Title	Length
4.	"I'm Goin' Mad"	4:53
5.	"Leave Me"	5:06
6.	"In Search of the Peace of Mind"	4:59
7.	"Inheritance"	4:41

== Personnel ==
Credits taken from Lonesome Crow liner notes.

Scorpions

- Klaus Meine – vocals
- Michael Schenker – lead guitar
- Rudolf Schenker – rhythm guitar
- Lothar Heimberg – bass guitar
- Wolfgang Dziony – drums

Production

- Conny Plank – producer
- Willem Makkee – mastering

== Charts ==
Chart performance for Lonesome Crow
Chart (2026)	Peak position
Belgian Albums (Ultratop Wallonia)	125
German Albums (Offizielle Top 100)	62
Greek Albums (IFPI)	73
Swiss Albums (Schweizer Hitparade)	54
