= In Dread Response =

- Origin: Auckland, New Zealand
- Genres: Melodic death metal
- Years active: Since 2005
- Labels: Deadboy, Universal
- Members: Steve Boag; Corey Friedlander; Trajan M. Schwencke; William Cleverdon; Ben Read
- Website: Official Website

In Dread Response is a New Zealand metal band from Auckland formed in 2005 commonly referred to as "In Dread" or "IDR".

In Dread has released three full-length studio albums and two EPs. Their video Cannons At Dawn from the album From the Oceanic Graves won the 2010 Juice TV Awards category Best Metal Video. In Dread have performed at GTaranaki 2010 alongside acts such as Slash. Their early EPs and first 2 albums have a sound that fuse Melodic Death Metal and Thrash Metal along with a few Doom Metal elements present. Their third album, "Heavenshore" was released independently and on Grind House Records in Japan in 2016 followed by a Tour of Japan to commemorate the signing.

== Members ==
Current members

- Steve Boag - Bass
- Corey Friedlander - Drums
- Trajan M. Schwencke - Guitars
- William Cleverdon (2015–present)
- Ben Read - Vocals (2014–present)

Former members

- Michael Exton - Bass
- Matthew Berry - Bass
- Nikolas Kissel - Drums
- Alex Bird - Drums
- David Wilson - Drums
- Ross McDougall - Guitars
- Andhe Chandler - Guitars
- Sean O'Kane Connolly - Vocals

== Discography ==
- Forgotten Wasteland EP (2005)
- In the Arms of the Absurd EP (2007)
- From the Oceanic Graves LP (2008)
- Embers in the Spiritless Void LP (2011)
- Heavenshore LP (2015)
