= Earthquake (album) =

Studio album by Electric Sun
- Released: April 1979
- Recorded: November 1978 and January 1979 at Olympic Studios, London
- Genre: Heavy metal, neo-classical metal
- Label: Brain/Metronome
- Producer: Uli Jon Roth

Electric Sun chronology
Earthquake (1979)	Fire Wind (1981)

Earthquake is the first album by Electric Sun. It was released in 1979 by Metronome.

Professional ratings
Review scores
Source	Rating
Allmusic	3.5/5 stars

== Track listing ==
- All compositions by Uli Roth
1. "Electric Sun" 5:16
2. "Lilac" 2:49
3. "Burning Wheels Turning" 6:41
4. "Japanese Dream" 3:52
5. "Sundown" 4:06
6. "Winterdays" 1:25
7. "Still So Many Lives Away" 4:40
8. "Earthquake" 10:31

== Personnel ==
Electric Sun

- Uli Jon Roth - guitars, vocals
- Clive Edwards - drums
- Ule Ritgen - bass guitar
