= Santeri Ojala =

Finnish musician known for "Shreds" video parodies

Santeri Ojala (born 20 February 1975), also known as StSanders, is a Finnish media artist and rock guitarist known for uploading the "Shreds" series of parody videos to YouTube, starting in 2007. The videos went viral, collectively attracting 7 million views by early 2008. Ojala appeared on Jimmy Kimmel Live! to demonstrate his method. Later imitators developed the idea further to create the "X Shreds" meme.

Each "Shreds" video by Ojala was based on concert footage of a famous shred guitarist, with the original sound completely replaced by Ojala playing badly for humorous effect. Sound effects were added, and Ojala replaced singing and speech with nonsense vocalizations.

Ojala's videos were taken down from YouTube in 2008 for copyright infringement despite the obvious fair use defense as parody. He continued to host them on his StSanders website. One targeted musician, Steve Vai, praised Ojala's humor, while Slash was uncomfortable being parodied on the Jimmy Kimmel Live! show.

== Shreds ==
The "Shreds" video idea came to Ojala as he was practicing on his electric guitar in front of his computer while watching a video by the American guitarist Steve Vai. Ojala discovered that it was fun to turn off the computer sound and replace it with his own imagination. On 11 April 2007, Ojala joined YouTube and began to upload his series of "Shred" videos. After eight months he was hosting 17 videos on his channel. The videos included parodies of Yngwie Malmsteen, Eric Clapton, Carlos Santana, Eddie Van Halen, Iron Maiden, Paco de Lucía and more. The video of Metallica was the first to go viral. Another popular video poked fun at Kiss performing "I Was Made for Lovin' You". Ojala told Guitar Player magazine in early 2008 that he selected his targets based on whether they were "great guitar players", and then he looked for "facial expressions and lots of showing off." His main tools were a "highly customized" Ibanez SA260 guitar, a Line 6 effects unit, and Adobe Audition editing software.

YouTube removed the videos at the beginning of February 2008. Ojala's account was banned after YouTube received three anonymous complaints of copyright infringement. Wired investigated the YouTube takedown and determined that it was likely Malmsteen who caused the removals. Ojala decided it would be too expensive to hire a lawyer and fight the decision. The videos continued to be available at Ojala's StSanders website and his MySpace page. Wired also provided a webhost for the videos at video.wired.com. The American comedian Jimmy Kimmel was a fan of the videos, and he asked Ojala to hurry to Los Angeles to appear on the next Jimmy Kimmel Live! show alongside Slash, the guitarist for Guns N' Roses, who was already a target for Ojala's satire. Live on the show, Slash appeared uncomfortable during Ojala's demonstration of the parody technique, interrupting him to show what an actual Slash guitar solo sounded like. Ojala said, however, that Slash praised his work backstage, after the show: "...he liked the video, he had no problem with it."

The humor of "Shreds" came from pairing the seriousness of the original performance and the overblown intensity of guitar solos with comically bad music. Part of the attraction of shred-type videos is that they are an example of cultural piracy, exploring the boundary between legal and illegal. Another attraction is the mockery of hypermasculinity. The replacement sound of the shred videos is usually strictly synchronized with the video; nothing is heard that is not a representation of something seen. In 2013, GQ magazine ranked "Shreds" as number 5 of the funniest 100 things on the internet.

=== X Shreds memes ===
Following Ojala's lead, other artists began making their own videos, collectively referred to as X Shreds. The first of these was a YouTube subcriber named Spiritswitchboard who parodied a total of five live performances by Creed, beginning in October 2007. Other media artists widened the scope to include any type of music and musician, for instance the American cellist Yo-Yo Ma performing "Air and Simple Gifts" at the first inauguration of Barack Obama in early 2009 was satirized by the YouTuber boilingsand. Inspired by Ojala's farcical treatment of Clapton, the Australian YouTuber allergonoise (Tom Mitchell) uploaded shred videos of Radiohead, Coldplay, Kings of Leon, Sigur Rós and others.

== Personal life ==
Ojala was born in a small town in Finland on 20 February 1975. He learned to play piano and guitar. He moved to Tampere for school and work. He became a multimedia artist, creating sizable art installations outdoors using audio and video electronics. Ojala is currently employed as a computer graphics supervisor at Energia VFX, involved in the 3D modeling process used by feature films, television programs and video advertisements.
