= Liz Vandall =

Swedish rock vocalist, and songwriter

- Born: Stockholm, Sweden
- Genres: Hard rock, blues rock, heavy metal, pop
- Occupations: Singer-songwriter, musician
- Instrument: Vocals
- Years active: 1987–present
- Formerly of: Sahara; Lyraka
- Website: Official website

Liz Vandall is a Swedish rock vocalist, and songwriter. She has recorded and performed as a member of the hard rock band Sahara, and recorded and toured extensively with Uli Jon Roth. A press release dated 7 April 2011 stated Vandall would be doing session work for the heavy metal opera project Lyraka.

Vandall lives in Germany with Roth, who is also her boyfriend. The two have a child, Akasha Dawn Roth.

== Discography ==
With Sahara

- Going Crazy (1992)
- The Seventh House (1994)

With Uli Jon Roth

- Transcendental Sky Guitar (2000)
- Under a Dark Sky (2008)

With Lyraka

- Lyraka Volume 2 (2012)

With Amadeus Awad (Lebanese Guitarist)

- Time of The Equinox (2012)
