= Zeno Roth =

German guitarist (1956–2018)

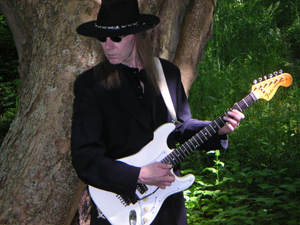

Background information
- Also known as: Jochen Roth
- Born: 30 June 1956; Düsseldorf, West Germany
- Died: 5 February 2018 (aged 61)
- Genres: Hard rock, blues-rock, pop-rock, heavy metal, neo-classical metal, classical
- Occupations: Musician, songwriter
- Instrument: Guitar
- Label: EMI Music
- Formerly of: Electric Sun

Jochen "Zeno" Roth (30 June 1956 – 5 February 2018) was a German guitarist and songwriter, playing in a neoclassical/blues style. He was the younger brother of guitarist Uli Jon Roth.

== Biography ==
In the 1970s, Jochen "Zeno" Roth and Ule W. Ritgen formed Black Angel in Hanover, and played together for a few years while attending university. After the band, which played music influenced by Eric Clapton, Jimi Hendrix, etc., broke up in 1977, Ritgen played bass in Jochen's brother Uli Jon Roth's band Electric Sun, appearing on three of their albums. By 1980, Jochen "Zeno" Roth and Ule Ritgen were again working together, now playing in a more melodic style. They were joined by Michael Flexig on vocals, and together they founded and formed the band ZENO.

Their first (self-titled) album was released in 1986. The band supported the album with shows, including a date opening for Queen in Newcastle, England on 9 July 1986, on what was the band's last-ever tour with Freddie Mercury.

Zenology was released in 1995, with songs that had been composed in the non-active period. A third album, Listen to the Light, was released in 1998. In April 1999, the band signed with Toshiba EMI (EMI Music Japan).

In the annual reader's pop poll of 1998 by Burrn! magazine, Listen to the Light was voted No. 2 as an album, and Jochen "Zeno" Roth reached the position No. 2 (guitarist) and No. 3 (songwriter). "Meet Me at the Rainbow" reached No. 9 as a tune. In 2000, ZENO re-released the first three albums with bonus tracks, on a set called The Making of Zeno. A compilation of previously unreleased material, Zenology II, was released in 2004.

In September 2006, the studio album Runway to the Gods was released. Roth was voted No. 2 as a guitarist in the annual Burrn! poll in 2006.

Roth died on 5 February 2018. According to his brother, he had been sick for several years.

== Discography ==
- Zeno (1986)
- Zenology (1995)
- Listen to the Light (1998)
- Zenology II (2005)
- Runway to the Gods (2006)
