= G-TARanaki Guitar Festival =

G-TARanaki
- Genre: Rock, Blues, Jazz, Classical, instrumental
- Dates: 14–19 July (2008); 28 September – 4 October (2009); 11–15 August (2010)
- Locations: New Plymouth, New Zealand
- Years active: 2008 – present
- Founders: Garry Sharpe-Young
- Website: www.gtaranaki.co.nz

GTaranaki, also known as G-TARanaki, was New Zealand's first international guitar festival held in New Plymouth, Taranaki, New Zealand annually from July 2008. The week-long festival brings some of the world's best guitarists to Taranaki to perform, educate, and inspire Kiwi guitarists and music fans throughout New Zealand. G-TARanaki features a celebration of all things guitar, with guitarists and bands from a range of genres including Rock, Funk, Classical, Jazz, Blues and Metal.

== 2008 ==
- Joe Satriani
- Uli Jon Roth
- Gray Bartlett
- Gilby Clarke
- Alex Skolnick Trio
- World War Four
- Glenn Hughes
- Vernon Reid
- Tim Donahue
- Brian Hatcher Band

The event was launched by an auction to benefit the cancer society. Items auctioned included guitars autographed by Pink Floyd, Bon Jovi, AC/DC and U2.

Guitar clinics and discussion forums were held throughout the week. Special midnight sessions included performances from Vernon Reid, from Living Colour, and Gilby Clarke, from Guns N' Roses, who were also joined by major artists on the bill such as Alex Skolnick (Testament / Alex Skolnick Trio) and Uli Jon Roth (Ex-Scorpions). These midnight sessions were held at Puke Ariki. Sky Academy, the music school founded by Uli Jon Roth, offered tuition classes at three Taranaki towns, Waitara, Inglewood and Ōpunake and included guests Vernon Reid and Gilby Clarke. Classical and Jazz performances were given by the New Zealand School of Music led by Matthew Marshall and Nick Granville.

There were a number of firsts for G-TARanaki. Uli Jon Roth performed songs from his album 'Under A Dark Sky' for the first time live. Glenn Hughes performed with a one off New Zealand band, involving guitarist Kara Gordon plus 8Forty8 band members Simon Koretz and drummer Nathan Koretz. Vernon Reid also played with a unique band comprising Jonathan Crayford on keyboards, Magesh Magesh on drums and Crete Haami on bass. Local vocalist Aidan Morrell also joined them for Living Colour hit 'Middle Man'

Paul Martin, DJ for New Zealand's longest standing Metal radio show 'The Axe Attack' performed with his band World War Four and was also MC for much of the G-TARanaki event.

New Zealand artists performing included False Start, Kara Gordon, Swap Gomez, Jamie Anderson, Frank John, Burt Ropiha, Bryce Wastney, Ross Townsend, Stephanie Piqette, Karl Austin, Nathan Annand, Brandon Reihana of Blindspott, Ross Halliday, Diarmuid Cahill, Adrian Whelan, New Plymouth Ukulele Orchestra, The Smiles, Dave Ritchie Smith, Craig Radford, Joel Haines, Matt Herrett and Ash & Aidan.

The second G-TARanaki festival is to be held in New Plymouth between 11 and 15 August 2010.

== Band Line Ups (2008) ==
Glenn Hughes
Glenn Hughes – vocals, bass
Simon Koretz – guitar
Kara Gordon – guitar
Nathan Koretz – drums
John Olinder – keyboards

Gilby Clarke
Gilby Clarke – vocals, guitar
Dennis Morehouse – drums
Muddy Stardust – guitar, bass, vocals

Vernon Reid
Vernon Reid – vocals, guitar
Magesh Magesh – drums
Crete Haami – bass
Jonathan Crayford – keyboards

Alex Skolnick Trio
Alex Skolnick – guitar
Matthew Zebroski – drums
Nathan Peklinsky – bass

Uli Jon Roth
Mark Boals – vocals
Liz Vandall – vocals
Uli Jon Roth – guitar
Lars Lehmann – bass
Niklas Turmann – guitar
Michael Ehre – drums
Corvin Bahn – keyboards
Akasha Roth – vocals

Joe Satriani
Joe Satriani – guitar
Jeff Campitelli – drums
Galen Henson – guitar
Stuart Hamm – bass

Kara Gordon Trio
Kara Gordon – vocals, guitar
Swap Gomez – drums
Jamie Anderson – bass

Gray Bartlett
Gray Bartlett – guitar
Chet O'Connell – guitar
Neil Hannan – bass
Bruce King – drums

Matthew Marshall Quartet
Matthew Marshall – guitar
Anita van Dijk – piano
Paul Dyne – bass
Roger Sellers – drums

Nick Granville Quartet
Nick Granville – guitar
Alex Nyman – saxophone
Nick Tipping – bass
Lance Phillip – drums

== 2009 ==
The 2009 event was held between 28 September and 4 October at Puke Ariki and TSB Stadium.

== Band Line-ups (2009) ==
Band Line-ups for 2009 UNKNOWN

== 2010 ==
The 2010 G-Taranaki line-up will consist of:

- Slash
- Uli Jon Roth
- Jennifer Batten
- Tony Levin
- Vinnie Moore
- Hail!
- Guy Pratt
- The Checks
- California Guitar Trio
- Oli Brown Band
- Desireé Bassett
- Shotgun Alley
- In Dread Response
- the Thomas Oliver Band
- Blue Monkey Racket
- Fall Within

-Legendary guitarist Leslie West was removed from the line-up for health reasons.

-the festival dates are 11 to 15 August, at the Puke Ariki and TSB Stadium in New Plymouth

== See also ==
- New Zealand music festivals
