= Fire Wind =

Studio album by Electric Sun
- Released: 1981
- Recorded: March and May, July and August 1980
- Studio: Olympic Sound Studios, London
- Genre: Heavy metal, neo-classical metal
- Label: BRAIN/Metronome
- Producer: Uli Jon Roth

Electric Sun chronology
Earthquake (1979)	Fire Wind (1981)	Beyond the Astral Skies (1985)

Professional ratings
Review scores
Source	Rating
Allmusic	2.5/5 stars

Fire Wind is the second album released by Electric Sun. It was released in 1981 by Metronome GmbH.

== Track listing ==
- All compositions by Uli Roth
1. Cast Away Your Chains 3:56
2. Indian Dawn 5:16
3. I'll Be Loving You Always 5:00
4. Firewind 5:03
5. Prelude in Space Minor 1:22
6. Just Another Rainbow 3:54
7. Children of the Sea 3:23
8. Chaplin and I 5:45
9. Enola Gay (Hiroshima Today?) 10:37
  - a) Enola Gay
  - b) Tune of Japan
  - c) Attack
  - d) Lament

== Personnel ==
Electric Sun

- Uli Roth – guitar, vocals
- Sidhatta Gautama – drums
- Ule Ritgen – bass guitar
