= In Trance =

Studio album by Scorpions
- Released: 17 September 1975
- Recorded: 1975
- Studios: Dierks Studios, Stommeln, West Germany
- Genres: Hard rock, heavy metal
- Length: 37:17
- Label: RCA
- Producer: Dieter Dierks

Scorpions chronology
Fly to the Rainbow (1974)	In Trance (1975)	Virgin Killer (1976)

Singles from In Trance
- 1. "In Trance" Released: November 1976

Alternative cover

Professional ratings
Review scores
Source	Rating
AllMusic	4.5/5 stars
Rock Hard	7.0/10
Teraz Rock	4/5 stars

In Trance is the third studio album by German rock band Scorpions, released by RCA Records in 1975. The music was a departure from the progressive rock of the two previous albums. Instead, the album has a hard rock sound of shorter and tighter arrangements with which the band would achieve their global success and fame. Extended suites in the vein of songs such as "Lonesome Crow" and "Fly to the Rainbow" are absent altogether. This was the first of two studio albums to feature drummer Rudy Lenners, and the first album by the band to contain the now-famous logo and controversial artwork.

== Artwork ==
The original version of the album cover--photographed by Michael von Gimbut was censored for clearly showing the cover model's exposed breast hanging down towards the guitar. Later releases blacked out the breast so that it is not visible. This is the first of many Scorpions album covers to have been censored. The band's former lead guitarist Uli Jon Roth claimed he may have "come up with the idea to do the thing with the guitar for the cover of In Trance".

However, in a 2008 interview Roth claimed that early Scorpions album covers in general were "the record company's idea-- but we certainly didn't object. And so shame on us. Those covers were probably the most embarrassing thing I've ever been involved with." He did, though, classify the In Trance cover as "borderline".

The White Stratocaster shown on the cover belonged to Roth and he can be seen playing the same guitar on the cover of the Electric Sun album Fire Wind. This is the guitar that Roth used on all subsequent Scorpions and Electric Sun albums on which he played.

This was the band's first album to feature the band's name written in the now-familiar font used on nearly all subsequent album covers--as well as their first collaboration with producer Dieter Dierks.

== Track listing ==
Side one
No.	Title	Writer(s)	Length
1.	"Dark Lady"	Ulrich Roth	3:30
2.	"In Trance"	Rudolf Schenker, Klaus Meine	4:47
3.	"Life's Like a River"	Roth, Schenker, Corina Fortmann	3:54
4.	"Top of the Bill"	Schenker, Meine	3:26
5.	"Living and Dying"	Schenker, Meine	3:24

Side two
No.	Title	Writer(s)	Length
6.	"Robot Man"	Schenker, Meine	2:47
7.	"Evening Wind"	Roth	5:06
8.	"Sun in My Hand"	Roth	4:25
9.	"Longing for Fire"	Schenker, Roth	2:44
10.	"Night Lights" (Instrumental)	Roth	3:14

== Personnel ==
Scorpions

- Klaus Meine – vocals
- Ulrich Roth – lead and slide guitar, vocals
- Rudolf Schenker – rhythm guitar, vocals
- Francis Buchholz – bass
- Rudy Lenners – drums

Additional musician

- Achim Kirschning – keyboards

Production

- Dieter Dierks – producer, engineer, mixing
