= Metamorphosis of Vivaldi's Four Seasons =

Metaporphosis of Vivaldi's Four Seasons

Studio album by Uli Jon Roth
- Released: 2003
- Genre: Rock, classical
- Length: 58:17

Uli Jon Roth chronology
Transcendental Sky Guitar (2000)	Metaporphosis of Vivaldi's Four Seasons (2003)	Under a Dark Sky (2008)

Metamorphosis of Vivaldi's Four Seasons is a musical piece featuring guitarist Uli Jon Roth's interpretation of Antonio Vivaldi's work The Four Seasons, in a rock-classical fusion. The album also includes a new concerto, "Metamorphosis". "Metamorphosis" is separated into 24 tracks bridged by soundscapes and narration. It was released in Europe and Japan in 2003, and in North America in 2004.

== Track listing ==
No.	Title	Length
1.	"Prelude to the Seasons" (by Uli Jon Roth)	1:44

I The Spring
No.	Title	Length
2.	"Venga La Primavera"	3:28
3.	"April Rain"	2:24
4.	"The Triumph of Spring"	3:59

II The Summer
No.	Title	Length
5.	"Tales of the Summer Wind"	4:59
6.	"Thunder in July"	1:34
7.	"The Tempest - Tuona e Fulmina"	3:20

III The Autumn
No.	Title	Length
8.	"Cheiron and Selenos"	4:41
9.	"Teardrops in October"	2:02
10.	"Artemis"	3:13

IV The Winter
No.	Title	Length
11.	"Ice, Wind & Fire"	3:15
12.	"Sleighbells at Yasnaya"	2:10
13.	"War of the Winds"	2:55

V Metamorphosis
No.	Title	Length
14.	"Thunder Cadenza"	1:25
15.	"Cry of the Night"	2:28
16.	"Summer's Breath"	0:43
17.	"Rodeo from Hell"	0:57
18.	"Les Adieux"	1:27
19.	"Springtime Euphoria"	2:11
20.	"The Heart of Chopin"	2:17
21.	"Dance of the Water Spirits"	0:45
22.	"Transfiguration"	1:18
23.	"Venga la Vita"	2:08
24.	"Postlude: The Morning of Forever"	2:54
Total length:		58:17

- 2–13 The Four Seasons by Antonio Vivaldi (Arranged and orchestrated by U.J.R.)
- 14–24 Metamorphosis by Uli Jon Roth

== Personnel ==
- Sky Guitar - Uli Jon Roth
- SKY ORCHESTRA - Section Leaders:
- 1st Violin - Stephen Bentley-Klein
- 2nd Violin - Brian Wright
- Viola - Giles Francis
- Cello - Nick Holland
- Contrabass - Lucy Shaw
- Harpsichord - Don Airey
- Timpani and percussion - Chris Lowe
- Narration - Uli Jon Roth
