= Dawn Road =

German band

- Origin: West Germany
- Genres: neoclassicism; hard rock
- Years active: 1972–1973
- Spinoffs: Scorpions
- Past members: Uli Jon Roth; Jürgen Rosenthal; Francis Buchholz; Achim Kirschning
- Website: ulijonroth.com

Dawn Road was a German hard rock band playing neoclassicism, formed in February 1972. All four members of Dawn Road ended up playing in Scorpions, with bassist Francis Buchholz staying for 12 albums throughout their most commercially successful era, leaving the band in 1992, later also playing with guitarist Uli Jon Roth who had a successful solo career after leaving Scorpions in 1978.

The line-up of Dawn Road featured Roth (lead vocals, guitar), Jürgen Rosenthal (drums), Buchholz (bass) and Achim Kirschning (keyboards, backing vocals). The band's repertoire consisted mainly of their own compositions, written by Roth and Kirschning, recorded in demos without releasing an album or single. For a short period between 1972 and 1973, Rudolf Schenker and Klaus Meine of Scorpions joined the group, before all four Dawn Road musicians joined the Scorpions in 1973, whom then only consisted of, Schenker and Meine.

Buchholz died on 22 January 2026.
