= Fly to the Rainbow =

Studio album by Scorpions
- Released: 1 November 1974
- Recorded: April 1974
- Studios: Musicland (Munich, West Germany); Studio Maschen (Seevetal, West Germany)
- Genres: Hard rock; psychedelic rock; krautrock
- Length: 40:47
- Label: RCA
- Producer: Frank Bornemann

Scorpions chronology
Lonesome Crow (1972)	Fly to the Rainbow (1974)	In Trance (1975)

Singles from Fly to the Rainbow
- 1. "Speedy's Coming" Released: 1975; 2. "Drifting Sun" Released: 1976

Professional ratings
Review scores
Source	Rating
AllMusic	3/5 stars
Teraz Rock	4.5/5 stars

Fly to the Rainbow is the second studio album by the German rock band Scorpions, released on 1 November 1974 by RCA Records. This was the band's first release with guitarist Uli Jon Roth and bassist Francis Buchholz, and the only one to include drummer Jürgen Rosenthal.

== Background ==
In support of the Lonesome Crow album, Scorpions toured as the opening act for the British rock band UFO. At the end of the tour, Scorpions lead guitarist Michael Schenker was asked to fill an open position as UFO's guitarist and accepted the position. Schenker's departure temporarily resulted in the breakup of the band but Rudolf Schenker and Klaus Meine ultimately merged with the band Dawn Road. The new band consisted of guitarist Uli Jon Roth replacing Michael as well as drummer Jürgen Rosenthal, keyboardist Achim Kirschnig and bass guitarist Francis Buchholz. The new lineup assumed the Scorpions name and recorded Fly to the Rainbow. Three songs on Fly to the Rainbow were co-written with departing guitarist Michael Schenker as part of his agreement on leaving the band.

== Artwork ==
When asked to comment on the cover art for the album, Uli Jon Roth said: "Don't ask me what that cover means… I disliked it from the beginning. It looked ludicrous to me back then and looks just as bad today. It was done by a firm of designers in Hamburg, who had actually done a good job on the Lonesome Crow album before, but I think that time they failed miserably. As for the meaning, I can only guess, but I'd rather not…"

Metal Hammer included it on their list of "50 most hilariously ugly rock and metal album covers ever". Staff writer Simon Young wrote: "Despite their success, Scorpions have played fast and loose with what constitutes a decent album cover. That milk carton helmet would provide no protection when you're flying around with bin lids for feet. But that's Scorpions for you. Visionaries when it comes to unorthodox footwear."

== Live performances ==
Six songs from Fly to the Rainbow were regularly performed live by Scorpions: the title track, "Speedy's Coming", "They Need a Million", "This Is My Song", and "Drifting Sun". "Far Away" was already performed by early lineups with Michael Schenker, since at least 1973. The live versions of "Speedy's Coming" and the title track appear on the live album Tokyo Tapes, which was recorded in April 1978. Soon afterwards, Scorpions dropped these songs from their setlist. Between 1980 and 1999, nothing from Fly to the Rainbow appeared in Scorpions concerts. Following a one-off performance of They Need a Million on 7 June 1999 at Patinoire de Kockelscheuer, Luxembourg, the title tune and "Speedy's Coming" were performed a number of times between 2000 and 2008. "Speedy's Coming" was played with relative frequency from 2015 to 2019.

== Track listing ==
Side one
No.	Title	Writer(s)	Length
1.	"Speedy's Coming"	Rudolf Schenker, Klaus Meine	3:36
2.	"They Need a Million"	R. Schenker, Meine	4:50
3.	"Drifting Sun"	Ulrich Roth	7:42
4.	"Fly People Fly"	Michael Schenker, Meine	5:03

Side two
No.	Title	Writer(s)	Length
5.	"This Is My Song"	R. Schenker, Meine	4:18
6.	"Far Away"	M. Schenker, R. Schenker, Meine	5:38
7.	"Fly to the Rainbow"	M. Schenker, Roth	9:40

== Personnel ==
Scorpions

- Klaus Meine – lead vocals, backing vocals ("Drifting Sun"), co-lead vocals ("They Need a Million")
- Ulrich Roth – lead and slide guitar, lead vocals ("Drifting Sun"), storytelling ("Fly to the Rainbow")
- Rudolf Schenker – rhythm guitar, co-lead vocals ("They Need a Million"), storytelling ("Drifting Sun")
- Francis Buchholz – bass guitar
- Jürgen Rosenthal – drums

Additional personnel

- Achim Kirschning – organ, Mellotron, synthesizers

Production

- Mack – engineer
- Horst Andritschke – engineer

== Charts ==
Chart (1976)	Peak position
Japanese Albums (Oricon)	83
