= Lyraka =

Multimedia art project

Lyraka is a multimedia art project. There has been one musical CD released from the project, Lyraka Volume 1, with another in the works. Also in the making is a graphic novel collaboration between the project's original creator, Jasmine Aliara, and horror artist Vince Locke. The project features several portraits both commissioned and licensed from fantasy artist Ken Kelly as well as Locke.

== Origins ==
Lyraka was originally conceived by Jasmine Aliara in 2006, as the result of a lifetime fascination with fantasy creatures and tales. Around that time composer-guitarist Andy DiGelsomina suggested making the project into something resembling a Wagnerian Gesamtkunstwerk, incorporating music, graphic novels, fiction, and ultimately film. As Aliara put together a website and script corresponding to her vision, DiGelsomina began composing music for the soundtrack.

== Story ==
Aliara's story is based upon a fictional teenager named Neires, who finds a magic guitar buried in his homeland of Errandia. The guitar transmits a siren's call to the ocean's depths (the latter containing the underwater empire of Lyraka), and the story centers around the protagonist's journey there. Other characters are the main antagonist, Lilliput, who tyrannically rules the aforementioned desert land; her vizier Semmonet; Pinador the dragon; Scatherus, a demonic servant of the ocean's abyss; Locke, the head of the underwater empire's palace guards, and the empress of Lyraka, Jasmine.

== Music ==
=== Lyraka Volume 1 ===
In November 2010 the CD Lyraka Volume 1 was released, which featured ex-Rainbow vocalist Graham Bonnet as Locke, Veronica Freeman as the serpentine Scatherus, and Tommy Heart as Neires.

=== Lyraka Volume 2 ===
The Lyraka Volume 2 CD is scheduled for 2016, and features Bonnet and Freeman reprising their roles; both Liz Vandall and Nina Osegueda as Lilliput (Vandall having been unable to complete her songs for personal reasons); Al Atkins as Semmonet; Mark Boals taking the place of Tommy Heart for the role of Neires, and Rob Diaz as Abyss. DiGelsomina has assumed the bulk of the production duties,

== Graphic novel ==
On May 6, 2012 it was announced Jasmine Aliara would collaborate with Vince Locke on the first Lyraka graphic novel which, like Lyraka Volume 2, is set to be published in 2016.
