= Andy DiGelsomina =

American songwriter

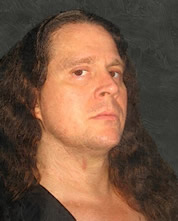
- DiGelsomina in 2012

Background information
- Born: Springfield, Ohio, US
- Genres: Rock opera, contemporary classical music, art music, Doom metal, Wagnerian rock, heavy metal
- Occupations: Composer, horror author, guitarist.
- Instrument: Lead guitar
- Years active: 2004–present
- Website: andydigelsomina.blogspot.com

Andy DiGelsomina is an American composer, horror author, lead guitarist, songwriter, and producer.

== Life and career ==
DiGelsomina was born in Springfield, Ohio. His father was a fan of rock music, while his fraternal grandfather preferred traditional art music which made both genres very impactful during the composer's early years.

Though the music of Elton John and Jerry Goldsmith started his lifelong love of music, DiGelsomina first aimed at becoming a fiction writer, shunning high school to earn a college degree at the age of eighteen. It was around that time that he heard the first Black Sabbath album and subsequently changed his major to music. His time in school was cut short when he abandoned the institutionalized education system and instead became a determined autodidact.

His next musical revelation came in the form of the operas of Richard Wagner, which spurred him to study orchestral scores and instruments, greatly expanding his range as a composer. He cites Ludwig van Beethoven's late-era string quartets as having had a profound effect on his writing during that time as well.

DiGelsomina first came to prominence in 2010, upon working with ex-Rainbow vocalist Graham Bonnet for the Lyraka album, Lyraka Volume 1, an album he wrote, played lead guitar on, and co-produced. Since then he has recorded with many people in the heavy metal genre, including Mark Boals, Al Atkins, and Veronica Freeman, among others.

In recent years DiGelsomina has reduced his involvement in the Rock genre in favor of writing Art music for the Symphony Orchestra, choir, and related instruments, as well as incorporating Aleatoric music, electronic, avant-garde, and Romantic compositional elements. This has resulted in the release of four symphonies, movements of which are featured on his blog.

It was announced May 14, 2020 that DiGelsomina would be returning to the heavy metal genre, working on a solo album entitled "Sic Itur Ad Astra" with ex-Candlemass vocalist Robert Lowe.

In 2026 it was announced that DiGelsomina would be collaborating with horror illustrator D. W. Frydendall on the Warrior Angel saga, a series of stories authored by DiGelsomina. The first story, entitled "Shadows of Nyarlathotep", will be published February 2027.

== Reception ==
Heavy metal critic Martin Popoff referred to DiGelsomina point blank as a "great songwriter", and Metal Rules magazine lauded the compositional style on Lyraka Volume 1, calling it a "type of cross-fertilized metal that...I've never heard before. Bands mixing different styles and influences is nothing new, but Lyraka have really created something special". DiGelsomina refers to this style as "Serial Vignette Composition".

== Discography ==
=== Lyraka ===
Lyraka Volume 1

- Released: November 2010
- Label: Mermaid's Song

Lyraka Volume 2

- Release: TBA
- Label: Mermaid's Song

=== Andy DiGelsomina ===
Symphony no. 1

- Release: October 2015
- Label: Phoenix Rising

Symphony no. 2

- Release: May 2017
- Label: Phoenix Rising

Symphony no. 3

- Release: August 2018
- Label: Phoenix Rising

Symphony no. 4

- Release: August 2019
- Label: Phoenix Rising

=== DiGelsomina ===
Sic Itur Ad Astra

- Release: June 2023
- Label: Phoenix Rising
