= Electric Sun =

German-English rock band

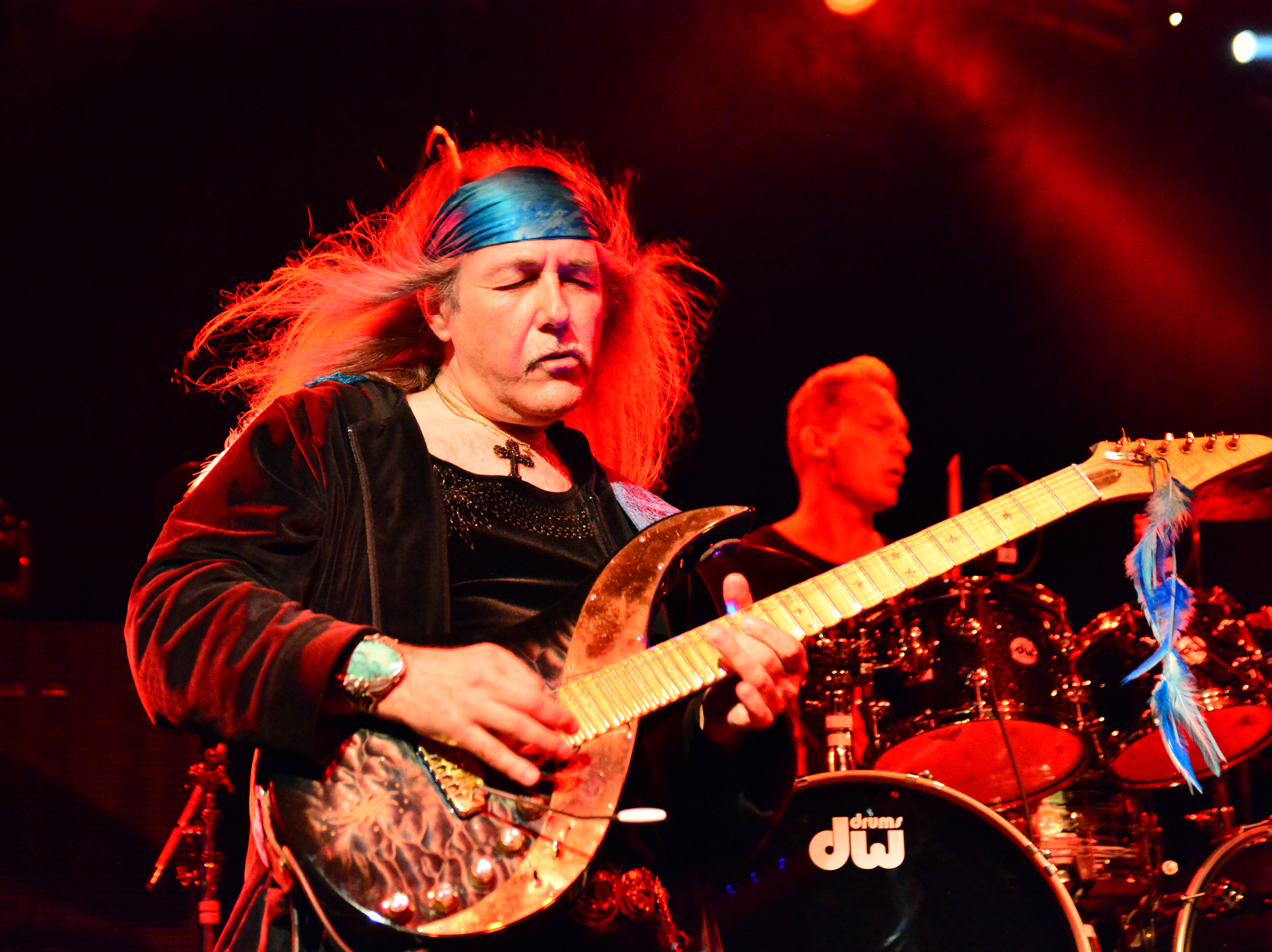
- Uli Jon Roth in 2015

Background information
- Origin: Hanover, Germany
- Genres: Hard rock; psychedelic rock; progressive rock
- Years active: 1978–1986
- Labels: Metronome GMBH, EMI
- Members: Uli Jon Roth; Ule Ritgen; Clive Edwards; Sidhatta Gautama; Clive Bunker; Michael Flexig; Nicky Moore; Simon Fox; John Young
- Website: ulijonroth.com

Electric Sun were an English rock band formed by German guitarist Uli Jon Roth of the rock band Scorpions in 1978. They released three albums between 1978 and 1986. The band are primarily English, with 3 German members and 1 Indonesian member.

Their first album, Earthquake, was released in 1979 and features guitarist/vocalist Roth, bassist Ule Ritgen and drummer Clive Edwards. Edwards departed, shortly after recording the first album.

Fire Wind was released next in 1981, featuring new drummer Sidhatta Gautama. The band toured, for the next few years afterwards. While the first two albums were recorded as a trio, the third album was more of an ensemble project. Veteran drummer Clive Bunker, formerly of Jethro Tull, appeared, as did bassist Ritgen, vocalist Michael Flexig and guest vocalist Nicky Moore from Samson, as well as an array of additional various singers and orchestral musicians. Another feature of the album, was the invention of Roth's Sky Guitar. In 1983, drummer and percussionist Simon Fox had worked, with drummer Clive Bunker.

The name Electric Sun was retired in 1986, and Uli Jon Roth continued to pursue classical-inspired rock, and focus on other artistic areas, under his own name.

== Discography ==
Date of release	Title	Label
1979	Earthquake	Brain/Metronome Gmbh
1981	Fire Wind	Brain/Metronome Gmbh
1985	Beyond the Astral Skies	EMI
