= Uli Jon Roth =

German guitarist (born 1954)

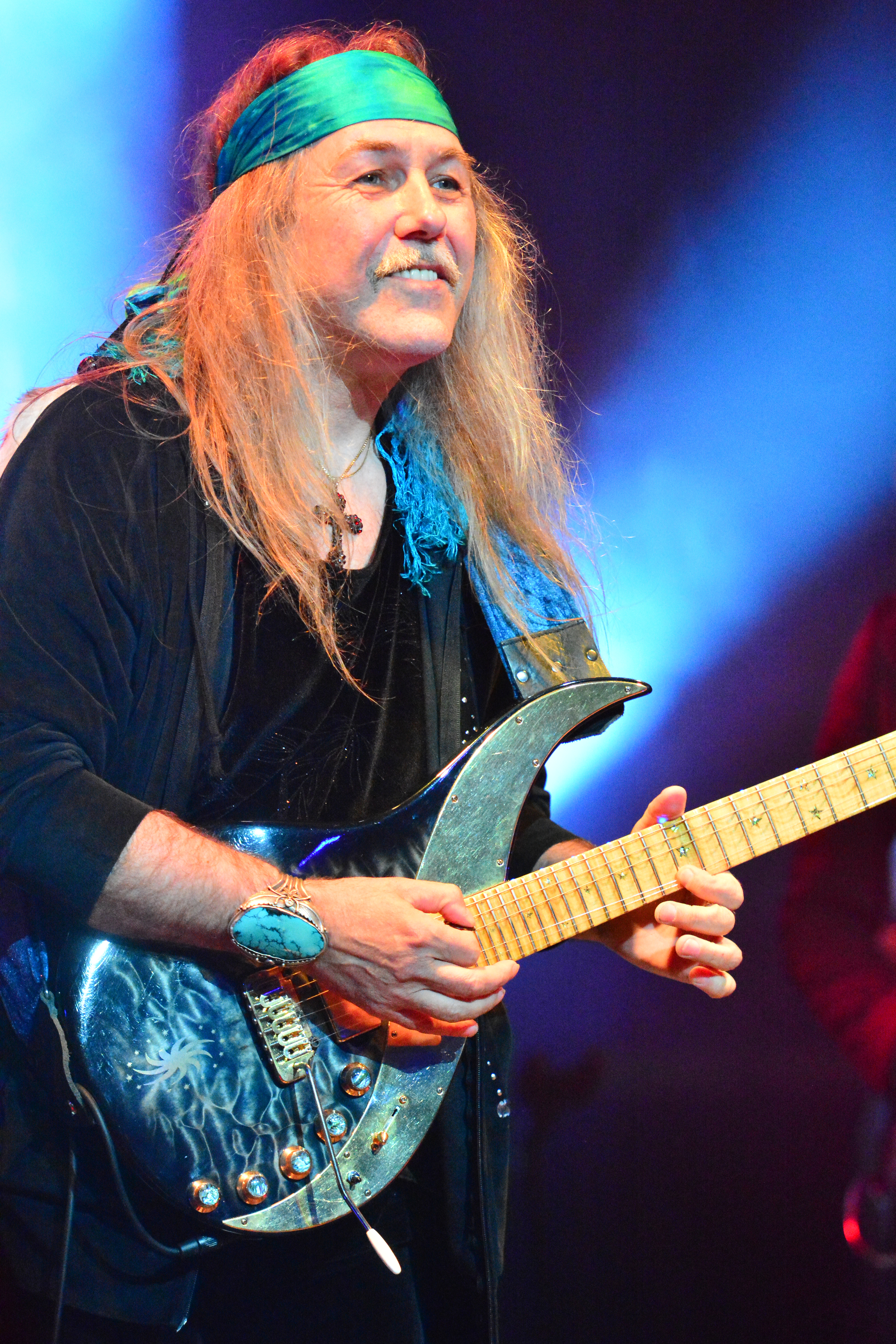
- Roth at Wacken Open Air 2015

Background information
- Also known as: Ulrich Roth
- Born: 18 December 1954 (age 71); Düsseldorf, West Germany
- Genres: Heavy metal; hard rock; speed metal; neoclassical metal; progressive metal; psychedelic rock; blues rock
- Occupation: Musician
- Instruments: Guitar, vocals
- Years active: 1968–present
- Formerly of: Dawn Road; Scorpions; Electric Sun
- Website: ulijonroth.com

Uli Jon Roth (born Ulrich Roth; 18 December 1954) is a German guitarist who became famous for his work with the hard rock band Scorpions and is one of the earliest contributors to the neoclassical metal genre. He is also the founder of the Sky Academy seminars and designer of the Sky Guitar. He is the older brother of fellow guitarist and artist Zeno Roth (1956–2018).

== Career ==
=== Dawn Road and Scorpions ===
Roth formed a band called Dawn Road in the early 1970s. When guitarist Michael Schenker left the Scorpions to join UFO in 1973, the two remaining Scorpions members Rudolf Schenker and Klaus Meine joined the four members of Dawn Road, but decided to use the name Scorpions rather than the less-well-known Dawn Road. Scorpions released four studio albums during his tenure as lead guitarist, main songwriter and occasional lead singer between 1974 and 1977, as well as their double live album, Tokyo Tapes, in 1978.

=== Electric Sun ===
Roth also formed his own band, Electric Sun, and released three albums: Earthquake (1979), dedicated to the spirit of Jimi Hendrix, Fire Wind (1981), dedicated to Anwar Sadat and featuring the song "Enola Gay (Hiroshima Today?)" about the atomic bombing of Japan by a Boeing B-29 Superfortress bomber of the same name, and Beyond the Astral Skies (1985), dedicated to both Martin Luther King Jr. and Roth's fans. This final album also featured ex-Jethro Tull drummer Clive Bunker on drums and timpani.

=== Solo career ===
Roth entered a new phase of creative work after Electric Sun, composing four symphonies and two concertos and sometimes performing with symphony orchestras throughout Europe. Roth used the name "Uli Jon Roth" for all subsequent album releases and concert appearances.

The G3 European tour of 1998 featured Roth playing with Joe Satriani and Michael Schenker. The show at London Wembley Arena also featured a jam with Brian May.

Roth played at the outdoor rock festival at Castle Donington in 2001 (also featuring original Scorpions lead guitarist Michael Schenker on the bill). This was filmed and subsequently released on DVD.

Roth appeared in concert with Scorpions onstage at the Wacken Open Air Festival in 2006 along with two other former members of the band. Billed as "A Night to Remember; A Journey Through Time", the Scorpions played four songs from the Roth era, most of which they had not played live since Roth had left in 1978. This concert was also filmed and released on DVD.

Although this was meant to be a "one night only" special event, its success meant that the format was repeated on several tours subsequently.

At the Rock am Ring festival in Germany in June 2007, Roth joined The Smashing Pumpkins on-stage for their epic closing song "Gossamer." He made another appearance with the Pumpkins upon their return to Germany on 26 February 2008, and a short documentary was made (which aired 1 May 2008) named "Corgan und Uli Jon Roth".

Roth had begun working on a new full-length studio album in 2007 which was to be released the following year. The title of the album would be: "Under A Dark Sky" and was going to be the first official release in the long-awaited series of Symphonic Legends (a cycle of music written by Uli for his all-encompassing Sky of Avalon project).

Roth debuted songs from "Under a Dark Sky" on 18 July 2008 in his headline set at the G-TARanaki Guitar Festival in New Zealand. This was his first concert in the country. Roth also took his "Sky Academy" tuition classes to Taranaki, Waitara, Inglewood and Ōpunake. Guests musicians included Vernon Reid and Gilby Clarke.

"Under a Dark Sky" was released in Japan on 20 August 2008 via Marquee records. The European and USA releases followed a month later on 20 September 2008 on the SPV record label.

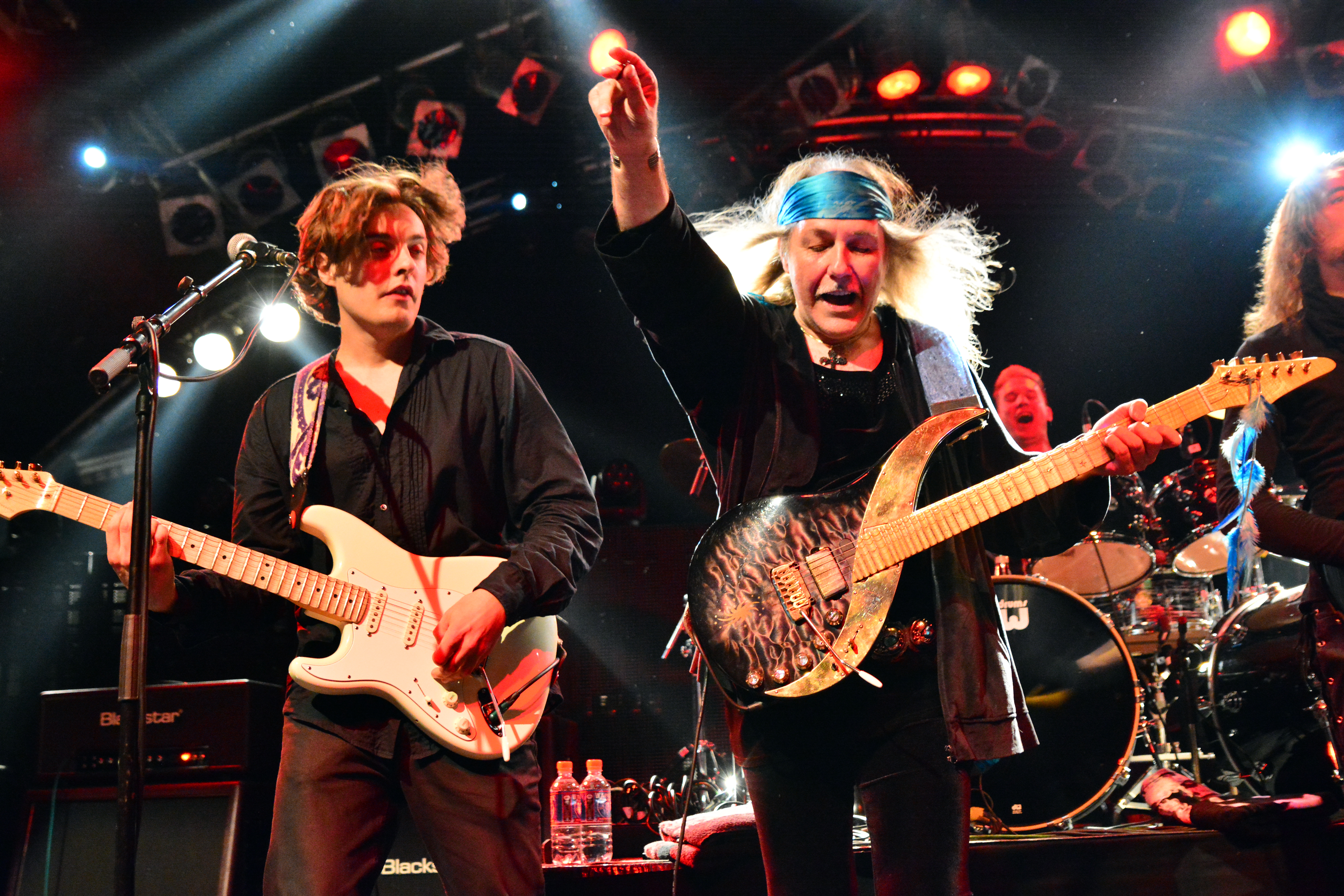
Roth (right) with his band at Hamburg Metal Dayz 2015

Uli Jon Roth released a two-CD studio album entitled Scorpions Revisited, which was recorded in 2014 in Hanover in early 2015. Roth revisited his personal favourites from the early Scorpions period.

A tour called The Ultimate Guitar Experience with fellow guitarists Jennifer Batten and Andy Timmons followed. Uli soon thereafter embarked on another world tour: this time playing The Tokyo Tapes, songs from the Scorpions 1978 tour of Japan and ensuing live album.

A double CD and Blu-ray/DVD were released in December 2016 of a concert Uli and his band played in Japan in 2015 commemorating the anniversary of The Tokyo Tapes. Roth concluded a short North American tour in March 2017, highlighting songs from both Scorpions Revisited and Tokyo Tapes.

Roth participated a second time at the G3 European tour with Joe Satriani and John Petrucci in March 2017.

Roth contributed an afterword to the 2017 book Shredders!: The Oral History of Speed Guitar (And More) by Greg Prato.

== Sky Guitars ==
Roth commissioned construction of custom guitars with additional frets from luthier Andreas Demetriou in the 1980s. Roth has had five of these "Sky" guitars made. To be able to emulate the high notes of a violin, all of the Sky Guitars have more frets than a typical electric guitar. The first Sky Guitar (used on the album Beyond the Astral Skies) had 30 frets. Later versions of the Sky Guitar overcame the problem of the higher register frets becoming too narrow by widening the frets by whole steps for the highest notes. In an April 2001 Guitar Player magazine interview, Roth reported that the guitars are either fretless above the 30th fret or have whole step fret spacing above the 27th fret, with 35 effective (half step) frets. All of the Sky Guitars with frets have scalloped fretboards. The Sky Guitar's pickups are custom 4-coil humbuckers, made by John Oram, with one guitar having an Oram pickup hidden under the 24th fret. For a time, Roth used a Framus Dragon amplifier, although currently he promotes Blackstar Artisan 100 & Series One 200 Watt heads. He has also used a stock-mounted Vibesware guitar resonator (sustainer) to introduce infinite sustain as on the instrumental Benediction on his Under A Dark Sky album. Dean Guitars produced 25 Custom Sky Guitars based on Roth's custom models with six and seven strings in 2011.

Roth founded Sky Guitars in 2017 and since then multiple guitars (10 distinct models as of 2024) have been made in Germany by Master Luthier Boris Dommenget

== Sky Academy ==
Roth established an annual seminar and concert program, known as Sky Academy, in May 2006. In it, Roth teaches a holistic approach to music making, comprising lectures, master classes, concentration exercises and special concerts. Guests have included Don Dokken, Tony Franklin, Rob Pagliari, Chris Poland, Kofi Baker, Chris Impellitteri, Jeff Scott Soto, Francis Buchholz and Robby Krieger. The first international Sky Academy was in July 2008, as part of the G-TARanaki Guitar Festival in New Plymouth, Taranaki, New Zealand.

== Playing style ==
Initially, Roth was inspired by The Beatles, The Jimi Hendrix Experience and Eric Clapton's fretwork on John Mayall & the Bluesbreakers and Cream. He would, later on, reveal his appreciation for fellow 1970 guitar heroes such as Pink Floyd's David Gilmour, Deep Purple's Ritchie Blackmore, The Kinks's Dave Davies and Jeff Beck, especially his fusion masterpiece Blow by Blow. In 1971 he began studying piano and classical guitar. His influences broadened, now including Spanish guitar virtuoso Andrés Segovia and violinist Yehudi Menuhin.

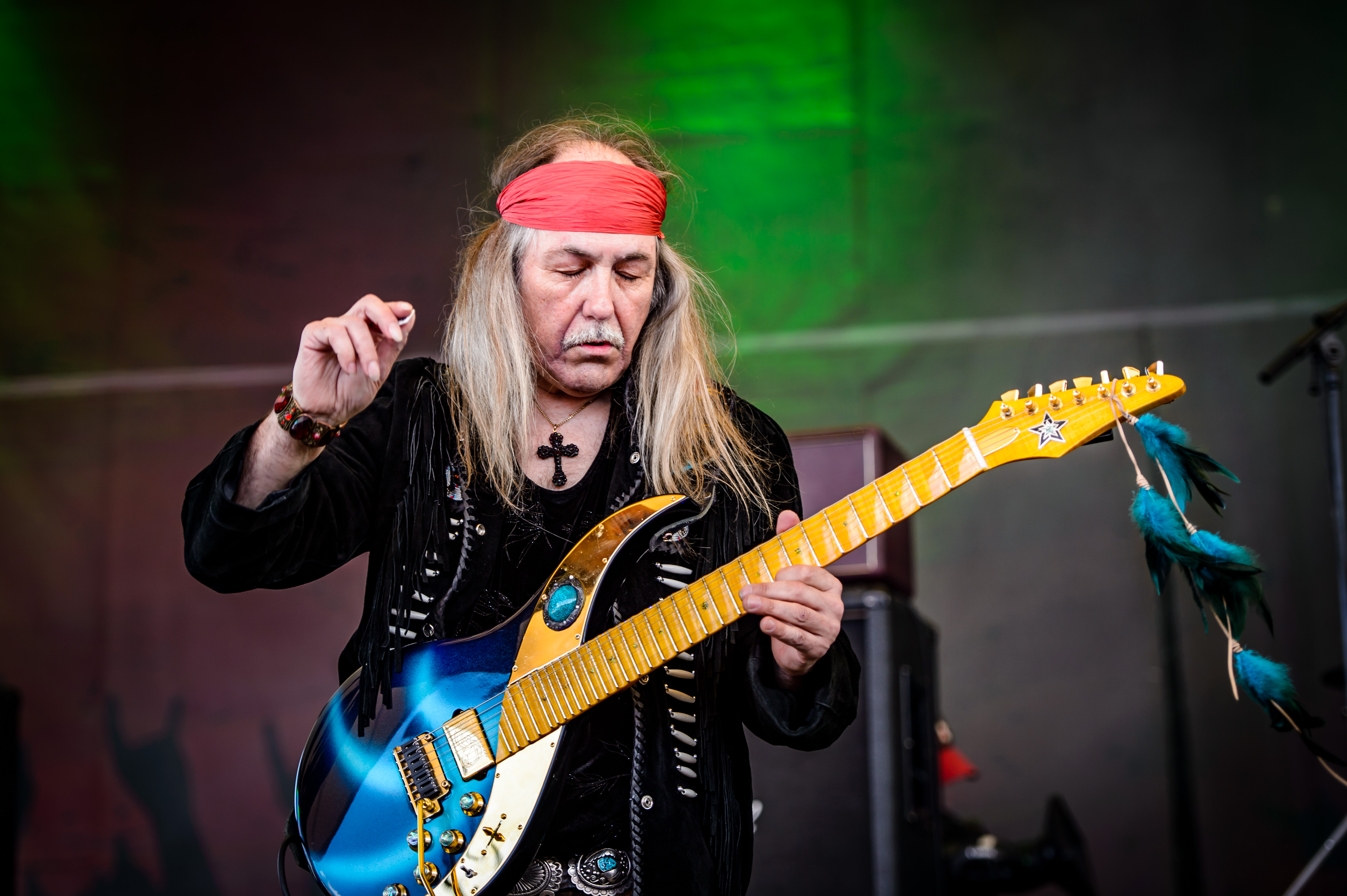
Roth performing in 2018

Roth's solo on Scorpion's "Sails of Charon," off the Taken by Force album, is notable for its speed and precision. The solo displayed a number of classical techniques, weaving pedal point sequences, harmonic "Middle Eastern" sounding scales and rapid-fire arpeggios. Metallica's Kirk Hammett famously quoted a portion of this solo on "Battery", the opening song of Master of Puppets (1986).

In Roth's early days with Scorpions, his soloing style was based primarily on the blues scale, occasionally incorporating notes from other modes. However, by the time the band recorded the Virgin Killer album, he began incorporating more advanced compositional elements from European classical music, such as pedal tone sequences and intricate arpeggios. Beginning with Electric Sun, the classical influence began to dominate his playing style, notably in songs like "Cast Away Your Chains" and "Still So Many Lives Away." His style eventually became a fusion of blues-based rock with European classical sensibilities. Roth employs major and minor pentatonic, the blues scale, phrygian, harmonic minor, diminished, and the whole tone scale.

== Personal life ==
Roth was romantically involved with artist Monika Dannemann, who had previously dated Jimi Hendrix and was with Hendrix on the night he died. Roth and Danneman collaborated on several songs, including "We'll Burn the Sky" from Scorpions' Taken by Force. Dannemann also painted the album covers for all three Electric Sun albums. Dannemann was convicted of breaking a 1996 British High Court order to not repeat allegations that Kathy Etchingham was an "inveterate liar" for accusing Dannemann of playing a role in Jimi Hendrix's death. Although Etchingham asked the judge to jail Dannemann, she was released. Dannemann was found dead days later in a fume-filled Mercedes-Benz near her cottage in Seaford, East Sussex, her death reported as a suicide. Roth dedicated his later works to the memory of Dannemann.

Roth currently resides in Llansilin, Powys, Wales. Roth performed his interpretation of Vivaldi's Four Seasons at a charity fundraising concert for Saint Silin's Church on 21 June 2019.

Roth has been a vegetarian since the Scorpions days.

== Legacy ==
Roth has been on the cover of many guitar magazines and has influenced many notable guitar players including: Billy Corgan, Kirk Hammett, Marty Friedman, Yngwie Malmsteen, Gus G, Andy DiGelsomina, Michael Romeo, Wolf Hoffman, Syu, Eric Peterson of Testament, Gordon Bergholtz, Hank Shermann of Mercyful Fate, Joe Stump, James Byrd, and Fredrik Åkesson from Opeth and Ghost.

== Discography ==
Year	Band	Title	Type
1974	Scorpions	Fly to the Rainbow	Studio
1975	Scorpions	In Trance	Studio
1976	Scorpions	Virgin Killer	Studio
1977	Scorpions	Taken by Force	Studio
1978	Scorpions	Tokyo Tapes	Live
1979	Electric Sun	Earthquake	Studio
1981	Electric Sun	Fire Wind	Studio
1985	Electric Sun	Beyond the Astral Skies	Studio
2000	Electric Sun	The Electric Sun Years Vol. I & II	DVD
1991	Uli Jon Roth	Aquila Suite – 12 Arpeggio Concert Etudes for Solo Piano	Studio
1996	Uli Jon Roth	Sky of Avalon – Prologue to the Symphonic Legends (with Sky Orchestra)	Studio
1998	Uli Jon Roth	From Here To Eternity	Compilation
2000	Uli Jon Roth	Transcendental Sky Guitar Vol. I & II	Live
2002	Uli Jon Roth	Legends Of Rock: Live At Castle Donington (DVD & CD)	Live
2003	Uli Jon Roth	Metamorphosis of Vivaldi's Four Seasons	Studio
2006	Uli Jon Roth	The Best Of Uli Jon Roth	Compilation
2008	Uli Jon Roth	Under a Dark Sky (Sky of Avalon)	Studio
2015	Uli Jon Roth	Scorpions Revisited	Studio
2016	Uli Jon Roth	Tokyo Tapes Revisited - Live in Japan (DVD & CD)	Live

=== Unreleased solo works ===
Year	Title
1987	Sky Concerto
1992	Europa ex Favilla (symphony)
1994	Hiroshima de Profundis (symphony)
1996/1997/1998	Requiem for an Angel (dedicated to the memory of Monika Dannemann)

=== Guest appearance ===
- Live at Wacken Open Air 2006 (2006) (DVD)
- The Sunflower Jam 2012 (2012) (DVD)
- Angels Cry 20th Anniversary Tour (2013) (DVD)

=== Session work ===
- Disco Motion (1978) lead guitar on "Rock Tell" by The Original Red Apple Orchestra
