= Rock Believer =

Studio album by Scorpions
- Released: 22 February 2022
- Recorded: 2020–2021
- Studios: Peppermint Park, Hannover, Germany
- Genres: Heavy metal; hard rock
- Length: 44:29
- Label: Vertigo
- Producers: Scorpions; Hans-Martin Buff

Scorpions chronology
Return to Forever (2015)	Rock Believer (2022)

Singles from Rock Believer
- 1. "Peacemaker" Released: 4 November 2021; 2. "Rock Believer" Released: 13 January 2022; 3. "Seventh Sun" Released: 11 February 2022; 4. "Shining of Your Soul" Released: 18 February 2022

Rock Believer is the nineteenth studio album by German rock band Scorpions, released on 22 February 2022 in the United Kingdom and 25 February elsewhere. This is the band's first studio album with drummer Mikkey Dee, who replaced James Kottak in 2016, and their first studio album in seven years since Return to Forever (2015), making it their longest gap between studio albums.

== Background and production ==
Scorpions toured for over a year in support of Return to Forever, where the band celebrated its 50th anniversary, and about three months before the album's tour cycle ended in December 2016, drummer James Kottak was fired from the band and Mikkey Dee was officially announced as his replacement. Scorpions toured for another three years, and a follow-up album from the band was uncertain, until August 2018 when guitarist Rudolf Schenker expressed interest in recording another album, telling the Digital Journal: "We are still waiting for a moment for inspiration to do another album, like Judas Priest and Metallica did. You have to wait until the time is right." In May 2019, frontman Klaus Meine hinted that "there might be a new album out in 2020."

Progress on Rock Believer had slowly been taking shape for nearly three years, with the writing sessions commencing as early as early-to-mid 2019, and the recording sessions beginning in July 2020 at Peppermint Park Studios in Hanover and wrapping up around the following summer/fall. The sessions were supposed to take place in Los Angeles, but the COVID-19 pandemic meant that the band would record the album remotely in Germany, with producer Greg Fidelman participating via Zoom. In a March 2021 interview with Robb Flynn of Machine Head, however, Dee revealed that Scorpions were forced to scrap plans to work with Fidelman because of the pandemic. Five months later, Scorpions posted a video on Facebook from the studio where they rehearsed an as-yet-untitled song for an upcoming tour.

On 29 September 2021, the band announced the release of Rock Believer with the first single "Peacemaker", which was released on 4 November, as well as a world tour, scheduled to begin with nine consecutive concerts in March 2022 in Las Vegas, Nevada.

== Critical reception ==
Professional ratings
Review scores
Source	Rating
AllMusic	3.5/5 stars
Blabbermouth.net	8/10
Classic Rock	4/5 stars
Sputnikmusic	3.5/5

Rock Believer has received mostly positive reviews. Jason Roche of Blabbermouth.net wrote that, with this album, "The rock icons revisit many of the sounds that fueled their superstardom's peak. The level of energy and songcraft present though keep those tracks from feeling tired, and perhaps for the first time in several records, there are even a few anthems that hold up next to the classics we've been re-purchasing on multiple formats over the decades." Roche also referred to it as a "testament to the band's self-confidence that on the fiftieth anniversary of their 1972 debut album, Lonesome Crow, the band's course of action was to simply do the things that they have always done best throughout their existence", and concluded that "Rock Believer serves as a comforting reminder that Scorpions are still capable of generating catchy rock anthems in their later years."

About Rock Believer, John Aizlewood of Classic Rock wrote, "The days of unashamed ballads such as 'Wind of Change', pop-metal ('Is There Anybody There?') and bold experiments ('The Zoo') are long gone. Instead, bar two versions of the majestic, lighters-aloft 'When You Know (Where You Come From)', they've gone full throttle with an intensity that would wind their grandchildren."

== Track listing ==
All lyrics are written by Klaus Meine, except "Crossing Borders" by Meine and Matthias Jabs.

Rock Believer track listing
No.	Title	Music	Length
1.	"Gas in the Tank"	Rudolf Schenker	3:40
2.	"Roots in My Boots"	Schenker	3:17
3.	"Knock 'em Dead"	Schenker	4:11
4.	"Rock Believer"	Meine, Schenker	3:57
5.	"Shining of Your Soul"	Schenker, Greg Fidelman	3:57
6.	"Seventh Sun"	Schenker, Hans-Martin Buff, Ingo Powitzer, Fidelman	5:30
7.	"Hot and Cold"	Jabs	4:12
8.	"When I Lay My Bones to Rest"	Schenker	3:07
9.	"Peacemaker"	Schenker, Paweł Mąciwoda	2:56
10.	"Call of the Wild"	Schenker	5:20
11.	"When You Know (Where You Come From)"	Schenker	4:22
Total length:			44:29

Deluxe edition
No.	Title	Music	Length
12.	"Shoot for Your Heart"	Meine	4:01
13.	"When Tomorrow Comes"	Schenker	3:47
14.	"Unleash the Beast"	Schenker	4:17
15.	"Crossing Borders"	Jabs	3:38
16.	"When You Know (Where You Come From)" (acoustic version)	Schenker	3:44
Total length:			63:56

Japanese edition bonus track
No.	Title	Music	Length
17.	"Out Go the Lights"	Schenker	3:39
Total length:			67:47

French edition bonus track
No.	Title	Music	Length
17.	"The Language of My Heart"	Meine	3:54

UK edition bonus track
No.	Title	Music	Length
17.	"Hammersmith"	Schenker, Mikkey Dee, Magnus Ax	3:44

== Personnel ==
Scorpions

- Klaus Meine – lead vocals
- Rudolf Schenker – rhythm guitar, background vocals, guitar solo on "When You Know (Where You Come From)", guitar arrangements
- Matthias Jabs – lead guitar, background vocals, acoustic guitar, slide guitar, guitar arrangements
- Paweł Mąciwoda – bass, background vocals
- Mikkey Dee – drums

Additional personnel

- Ingo Powitzer – additional guitars and bass, guitar solo on "When Tomorrow Comes", additional background vocals, claps, guitar arrangements, guitar tech
- Jakob Himmelein – additional background vocals, claps, recording assistant
- Alex Malek – additional background vocals, claps
- Pitti Hecht – percussion

Technical

- Scorpions – production
- Hans-Martin Buff – production, recording, programming, sound design, additional background vocals, claps
- Michael Ilbert – mixing
- Tom Porcell Woznik – mastering
- Peter Kirkman – guitar tech
- Matthias Liebetruth – drum tech
- René Thomsen – drum tech
- Rocket and Wink – design, artwork
- Jeff Thrower – cover-photo
- Marc Theis – backcover-photo
- Klaus Voormann – coverdesign

== Charts ==
=== Weekly charts ===
Weekly chart performance for Rock Believer
Chart (2022)	Peak position
Austrian Albums (Ö3 Austria)	4
Belgian Albums (Ultratop Flanders)	3
Belgian Albums (Ultratop Wallonia)	1
Canadian Albums (Billboard)	60
Croatian International Albums (HDU)	3
Czech Albums (ČNS IFPI)	14
Dutch Albums (Album Top 100)	15
Finnish Albums (Suomen virallinen lista)	3
French Albums (SNEP)	2
German Albums (Offizielle Top 100)	2
Greek Albums (IFPI)	7
Hungarian Albums (MAHASZ)	5
Italian Albums (FIMI)	24
Japanese Albums (Oricon)	27
Japanese Hot Albums (Billboard Japan)	33
Polish Albums (ZPAV)	1
Portuguese Albums (AFP)	5
Scottish Albums (Official Charts)	8
Spanish Albums (Promusicae)	5
Swedish Albums (Sverigetopplistan)	6
Swiss Albums (Schweizer Hitparade)	2
UK Albums (Official Charts)	18
UK Rock & Metal Albums (Official Charts)	2
US Billboard 200	59
US Top Hard Rock Albums (Billboard)	2
US Top Rock Albums (Billboard)	9

=== Year-end charts ===
Year-end chart performance for Rock Believer
Chart (2022)	Position
French Albums (SNEP)	168
German Albums (Offizielle Top 100)	22
Swiss Albums (Schweizer Hitparade)	77
