= Box of Scorpions =

Box set by Scorpions
- Released: 25 May 2004
- Genre: Hard rock, heavy metal
- Label: Hip-O
- Producer: various

Scorpions compilations chronology
| Bad for Good: The Very Best of Scorpions (2002) | Box of Scorpions (2004) | The Platinum Collection (2005) |

Box of Scorpions is a triple-CD compilation album by the German heavy metal band Scorpions, released on May 25, 2004. It is one of the only compilations to feature songs from both the RCA and Mercury Records catalogue, including tracks from every studio album from 1972's Lonesome Crow through 2000's Moment of Glory. It concludes with two tracks previously released on the 2002 hits compilation Bad for Good: The Very Best of Scorpions.

== Track listing ==
=== Disc one ===
1. "I'm Going Mad" – 4:51
2. "Speedy's Coming" – 3:33
3. "Fly to the Rainbow" – 9:35
4. "In Trance" – 4:42
5. "Pictured Life" – 3:23
6. "Virgin Killer" – 3:42
7. "Catch Your Train" – 3:34
8. "Steamrock Fever" – 3:36
9. "We'll Burn the Sky" – 6:26
10. "He's a Woman, She's a Man" – 3:13
11. "Backstage Queen" [Live] – 3:38
12. "Top of the Bill" [Live] – 6:46
13. "Dark Lady" [Live] – 3:39
14. "Robot Man" [Live] – 5:38
15. "Loving You Sunday Morning" – 5:36
16. "Holiday" – 6:30

=== Disc two ===
1. "Coast to Coast" – 4:38
2. "Lovedrive" – 4:47
3. "Make It Real" – 3:49
4. "Don't Make No Promises (Your Body Can't Keep)" – 2:56
5. "Twentieth Century Man" – 3:00
6. "The Zoo" – 5:28
7. "Blackout" – 3:47
8. "Can't Live Without You" – 3:45
9. "No One Like You" – 3:56
10. "Dynamite" – 4:12
11. "Bad Boys Running Wild" – 3:54
12. "Rock You Like a Hurricane" – 4:11
13. "Coming Home" – 4:58
14. "Big City Nights" – 4:08
15. "Still Loving You" – 6:26
16. "Another Piece of Meat" [Live] – 3:39
17. "Don't Stop at the Top" – 4:03
18. "Rhythm of Love" – 3:48
19. "I Can't Explain" – 3:21

=== Disc three ===
1. "Tease Me, Please Me" – 4:43
2. "Believe in Love" – 5:23
3. "Don't Believe Her" – 4:54
4. "Wind of Change" – 5:11
5. "Send Me an Angel" – 4:32
6. "Hit Between the Eyes" – 4:32
7. "Alien Nation" – 5:43
8. "Under the Same Sun" – 4:52
9. "Woman" – 5:55
10. "Over the Top" – 4:24
11. "Life Goes Around" – 3:41
12. "You and I" – 6:13
13. "Mysterious" – 5:28
14. "Hurricane 2000" – 6:02
15. "‘Cause I Love You" – 3:44
16. "Bad for Good" – 4:04
