= Classic Bites =

Greatest hits album by Scorpions
- Released: 5 February 2002
- Recorded: 1990–1994
- Genre: Hard rock, heavy metal
- Length: 79:16
- Label: Mercury
- Producer: Keith Olsen, Bruce Fairbairn, Scorpions

Scorpions compilations chronology
20th Century Masters - The Millennium Collection: The Best of Scorpions (2001)	Classic Bites (2002)	Bad for Good: The Very Best of Scorpions (2002)

Classic Bites is a compilation album released in 2002 by the German hard rock/heavy metal band Scorpions. It features songs from two studio albums—Crazy World (1990) and Face the Heat (1993)—as well as a single track from the 1995 live album Live Bites.

== Reception ==
Professional ratings
Review scores
Source	Rating
Allmusic	1.5/5 stars

Greg Prato of AllMusic criticises the compilation, claiming that it "falls very short" as it "focuses entirely on their early-'90s period... and nothing earlier". He suggests that Bad for Good: The Very Best of Scorpions is "a much more thorough collection".

== Track listing ==
All music is composed by Rudolf Schenker except where noted.

No.	Title	Lyrics	Original album	Length
1.	"Crazy World"	Klaus Meine, Schenker, Herman Rarebell, Jim Vallance	Crazy World	5:09
2.	"Alien Nation"	Meine	Face the Heat	5:43
3.	"Tease Me Please Me" (Music: Matthias Jabs, Vallance)	Meine, Rarebell, Vallance	Crazy World	4:36
4.	"No Pain No Gain"	Meine, Mark Hudson	Face the Heat	3:46
5.	"In Trance" (live)	Meine	Live Bites	4:02
6.	"Hit Between the Eyes"	Rarebell, Meine, Vallance	Crazy World	4:21
7.	"Under the Same Sun" (Music: Hudson, Scott Fairbairn, Meine)	Hudson, Fairbairn, Meine	Face the Heat	4:51
8.	"Lonely Nights"	Meine	Face the Heat	4:40
9.	"Send Me an Angel"	Meine	Crazy World	4:30
10.	"Ship of Fools"	Meine	Face the Heat	4:15
11.	"Restless Nights"	Meine, Rarebell, Vallance	Crazy World	5:22
12.	"Lust or Love" (Music: Meine)	Meine, Rarebell, Vallance	Crazy World	4:22
13.	"Don't Believe Her" (Music: Schenker, Vallance)	Rarebell, Meine, Vallance	Crazy World	4:51
14.	"Unholy Alliance"	Meine	Face the Heat	5:15
15.	"Kicks After Six" (Music: Francis Buchholz, Vallance)	Rarebell, Meine, Vallance	Crazy World	3:46
16.	"To Be with You in Heaven"	Meine	Crazy World	4:36
17.	"Wind of Change" (Music: Meine)	Meine	Crazy World	5:11
Total length:				79:16

== Personnel ==
- Klaus Meine – lead vocals, whistling on "Wind of Change"
- Matthias Jabs – lead guitar, acoustic guitar on "Send Me an Angel", backing vocals
- Rudolf Schenker – rhythm guitar, lead guitar, backing vocals
- Francis Buchholz – bass, backing vocals (tracks 1, 3, 6, 9, 11–13, 15–17)
- Ralph Rieckermann – bass, backing vocals (tracks 2, 4–5, 7–8, 10, 14)
- Herman Rarebell – drums, percussion, backing vocals
