= The Platinum Collection (Scorpions album) =

Compilation album by Scorpions
- Released: 2005
- Genre: Hard rock, Heavy metal
- Label: EMI Music Germany
- Producer: Various

Scorpions compilations chronology
Box of Scorpions (2004)	The Platinum Collection (2005)	Gold (2006)

The Platinum Collection is a compilation album by German hard rock band Scorpions, released in 2005, in Europe, Australia and South Africa.

A three-disc compilation covering 1975's In Trance through 2004's Unbreakable, it is one of the band's few near career-spanning sets, featuring their better-known Mercury Records material, as well as the earlier material released on RCA (although the band's first two albums Lonesome Crow and Fly To The Rainbow are ignored).

As the AllMusicGuide review from Greg Prato points out, "Ultimately, although it consists of a trio of discs, Platinum Collection features far too much post-1984 material (a full disc and a half), and not nearly enough '70s selections, when the Scorpions were one darn vicious metal act (and the non-inclusion of such early classics as 'Speedy's Coming' and 'The Sails of Charon' is absolutely ridiculous). As a result, one of the many shorter -- yet more wisely assembled -- Scorpions collections would make a better purchase (such as 2006's Gold)."

== Track listing ==
=== Disc one ===
1. "In Trance" (1975) (Rudolf Schenker/Klaus Meine) - 4:42
2. "Crying Days" (1976) (Rudolf Schenker/Klaus Meine) - 4:37
3. "Pictured Life" (1977) (Rudolf Schenker/Klaus Meine/Ulrich Roth) - 3:21
4. "He's A Woman - She's A Man"* (1977) (Rudolf Schenker/Klaus Meine, Herman Rarebell) - 3:14
5. "Coast To Coast"* (1979) (Rudolf Schenker) - 4:42
6. "Lovedrive"* (1979) (Rudolf Schenker/Klaus Meine) - 4:51
7. "Is There Anybody There?"* (1979) (Rudolf Schenker/Klaus Meine, Herman Rarebell) - 4:21
8. "Holiday"* (1979) (Rudolf Schenker/Klaus Meine) - 6:34
9. "Another Piece Of Meat"* (1979) (Rudolf Schenker/Herman Rarebell) - 3:33
10. "Make It Real"* (1980) (Rudolf Schenker/Herman Rarebell) - 3:52
11. "The Zoo"* (1980) (Rudolf Schenker/Klaus Meine) - 5:31
12. "Hey You"* (1980) (Rudolf Schenker/Klaus Meine) - 3:48
13. "Blackout"* (1982) (Rudolf Schenker/Klaus Meine, Herman Rarebell, Sonia Kittelson) - 3:47
14. "Can't Live Without You"* (1982) (Rudolf Schenker/Klaus Meine) - 3:44
15. "Now!"* (1982) (Rudolf Schenker/Klaus Meine, Herman Rarebell) - 2:32
16. "Dynamite"* (1982) (Rudolf Schenker/Klaus Meine, Herman Rarebell) - 4:10

=== Disc two ===
1. "No One Like You"* (1982) (Rudolf Schenker/Klaus Meine) - 3:54
2. "Bad Boys Running Wild"* (1984) (Rudolf Schenker/Klaus Meine, Herman Rarebell) - 3:53
3. "Still Loving You" (1984) (Rudolf Schenker/Klaus Meine) - 6:08
4. "Big City Nights"* (1984) (Rudolf Schenker/Klaus Meine) - 4:02
5. "Rock You Like A Hurricane"* (1984) (Rudolf Schenker/Klaus Meine, Herman Rarebell) - 4:10
6. "Coming Home"* (1984) (Rudolf Schenker/Klaus Meine) - 4:58
7. "Rhythm of Love"* (1988) (Rudolf Schenker/Klaus Meine) - 3:48
8. "Believe in Love"* (1988) (Rudolf Schenker/Klaus Meine) - 4:50
9. "Passion Rules The Game"* (1989) (Herman Rarebell/Klaus Meine) - 3:59
10. "Can't Explain" (1989) (Pete Townshend) - 3:21
11. "Living For Tomorrow" (Live) (1992) (Rudolf Schenker/Klaus Meine) - 7:14
12. "Wind of Change" (1991) (Klaus Meine) - 5:10
13. "Send Me an Angel" (1991) (Rudolf Schenker/Klaus Meine) - 4:33
14. "Alien Nation" (1993) (Rudolf Schenker/Klaus Meine) - 5:43
15. "No Pain No Gain" (1993) (Rudolf Schenker/Klaus Meine) - 3:54
16. "Under the Same Sun" (Album Version) (1993) (Mark Hudson, Klaus Meine, Scott Fairbairn) - 4:52

=== Disc three ===
1. "You And I" (Album Version) (1996) (Klaus Meine) - 6:13
2. "Does Anyone Know" (Album Version) (1996) (Klaus Meine) - 5:55
3. "Wild Child" (1996) (Rudolf Schenker/Klaus Meine) - 4:16
4. "Where The River Flows" (1997) (Rudolf Schenker/Klaus Meine) - 4:09
5. "Edge Of Time" (1995) (Rudolf Schenker/Klaus Meine) - 4:16
6. "When You Came Into My Life" (New Version) (1996) (James F. Sundah/Klaus Meine, Rudolf Schenker, Titek Puspa) - 4:23
7. "A Moment In A Million Years" (1999) (Klaus Meine) - 3:38
8. "10 Light Years Away" (1999) (Klaus Meine, M. Frederiksen, M. Jones, Rudolf Schenker) - 3:52
9. "Eye To Eye" (1999) (Rudolf Schenker/Klaus Meine) - 5:04
10. "Mysterious" (1999) (J.M. Byron, Matthias Jabs, R. Rieckermann, Rudolf Schenker/Klaus Meine) - 5:28
11. "Aleyah" (1999) (Rudolf Schenker/Klaus Meine) - 4:19
12. "Moment Of Glory" (2000) (Klaus Meine) - 5:07
13. "Here In My Heart" (2000) (Diane Warren) - 4:20
14. "When Love Kills Love" (2001) (Rudolf Schenker/Klaus Meine) - 3:38
15. "Deep And Dark" (2004) (Sebastian Dreher/Klaus Meine) - 3:37
16. "Remember The Good Times" (2004) (Retro Garage Mix) (Rudolf Schenker, Eric Bazlian/Eric Bazlian, Klaus Meine) - 4:24

'*Digital Remaster 2001

== Charts ==
Chart (2006)	Peak position
Belgian Albums (Ultratop Wallonia)	92
Finnish Albums (Suomen virallinen lista)	7
Italian Albums (FIMI)	79
Portuguese Albums (AFP)	25
Spanish Albums (PROMUSICAE)	78
