= Bad for Good: The Very Best of Scorpions =

Compilation album by Scorpions
- Released: 28 May 2002
- Recorded: 1979–2002
- Genre: Hard rock; glam metal; heavy metal
- Length: 79:44
- Label: Hip-O Records
- Producer: Various

Scorpions compilations chronology
Classic Bites (2002)	Bad for Good: The Very Best of Scorpions (2002)	Box of Scorpions (2004)

Professional ratings
Review scores
Source	Rating
Allmusic	4.5/5 stars

Bad for Good: The Very Best of Scorpions is a compilation album by the German heavy metal band Scorpions, released in 2002 by Hip-O Records. The final two songs, "Cause I Love You" and the title track are new tracks and were written for the compilation.

== Track listing ==
All tracks are written by Rudolf Schenker and Klaus Meine, except noted.

No.	Title	Original album (year)	Length
1.	"Rock You Like a Hurricane" (Schenker, Meine, Herman Rarebell)	Love at First Sting (1984)	4:12
2.	"Loving You Sunday Morning" (Schenker, Meine, Rarebell)	Lovedrive (1979)	5:36
3.	"The Zoo"	Animal Magnetism (1980)	5:28
4.	"No One Like You"	Blackout (1982)	3:56
5.	"Blackout" (Schenker, Meine, Rarebell, Sonja Kittelsen)	Blackout (1982)	3:47
6.	"Still Loving You" (Single version)	Love at First Sting (1984)	4:48
7.	"Big City Nights"	Love at First Sting (1984)	4:08
8.	"Believe in Love" (Single version)	Savage Amusement (1988)	4:04
9.	"Rhythm of Love"	Savage Amusement (1988)	3:48
10.	"I Can't Explain" (The Who cover, written by Pete Townshend)	Best of Rockers 'n' Ballads (1989)	3:22
11.	"Wind of Change" (Meine)	Crazy World (1990)	5:10
12.	"Send Me an Angel"	Crazy World (1990)	4:32
13.	"Don't Believe Her" (Schenker, Meine, Rarebell, Jim Vallance)	Crazy World (1990)	4:54
14.	"Tease Me Please Me" (Meine, Rarebell, Vallance, Matthias Jabs)	Crazy World (1990)	4:42
15.	"Hit Between the Eyes" (Schenker, Meine, Rarebell, Vallance)	Crazy World (1990)	4:31
16.	"Alien Nation" (Single version)	Face the Heat (1993)	5:01
17.	"Cause I Love You"	Previously unreleased (2002)	3:44
18.	"Bad for Good" (Schenker, Meine, Dieter Dierks)	Previously unreleased (2002)	4:02

== Personnel ==
Scorpions

- Klaus Meine – vocals, backing vocals, whistling (track 11)
- Rudolf Schenker – rhythm guitars, acoustic guitars, lead guitar [tracks 6 (outro), 7, 11 & 12], backing vocals
- Matthias Jabs – lead guitars, rhythm guitars (tracks 6, 7, 11 & 12), acoustic guitars (track 12), slide guitars, talk box (tracks 3 & 17)
- Michael Schenker – lead guitar (track 2)
- Francis Buchholz – bass guitars, backing vocals (tracks 1–15)
- Ralph Rieckermann – bass guitars, backing vocals (tracks 16–18)
- Herman Rarebell – drums, backing vocals (tracks 1–16)
- James Kottak – drums, backing vocals (tracks 17 & 18)

Additional musicians

- Lee Aaron – backing vocals (track 9)
- Koen van Baal, Robbie Buchanan – keyboards (track 11)
- Jim Vallance – keyboards (track 12)

== Charts ==
Chart (2002)	Peak position
US Billboard 200	161
