= Return to Forever (Scorpions album) =

Studio album by Scorpions
- Released: 20 February 2015
- Recorded: 2011–2014
- Genres: Hard rock; heavy metal
- Length: 47:38
- Labels: Sony Music Germany; RCA Records
- Producers: Mikael Nord Andersson; Martin Hansen

Scorpions chronology
Sting in the Tail (2010)	Return to Forever (2015)	Rock Believer (2022)

Singles from Return to Forever
- 1. "We Built This House" Released: 27 December 2014; 2. "Eye of the Storm" Released: 8 May 2015; 3. "Going Out with a Bang" Released: 21 August 2015; 4. "Rock 'n' Roll Band" Released: 11 March 2016

Return to Forever is the eighteenth studio album by German rock band Scorpions. It was released in Europe on 20 February 2015. The album marks the final release of the band to feature the Unbreakable-era lineup with longtime drummer James Kottak leaving the band in September 2016, being replaced by former Motörhead drummer Mikkey Dee.

== Background ==
In late 2011, the band started throwing ideas for further side projects. They had in mind two ideas. One was to release a film made from over 900 hours of footage from concerts different festivals, concert on Moscow's Red Square, concerts in Amazon rainforest, in front of Pyramids and Russian tour in 2002 and the other one was to release bonus track an album from unreleased songs, mainly from the period when their albums were released on vinyl which had the possibility to fit only eight or nine songs.

In 2011 the band members started searching unreleased songs in their archives. They found many unreleased songs and some of the songs that they hadn't finished composing. These songs mainly had draft lyrics and there were also a couple of jams. Band members compiled a total of three CDs of unreleased songs and gave them to the producers Mikael Nord Andersson and Martin Hansen to choose the best ones for the album. the band entered the studio in early January and stayed in there until late March 2012. They reworked the unfinished songs from Blackout (1982), Love at First Sting (1984), Savage Amusement (1988) and Crazy World (1990) era. Those unfinished songs were recorded only as a simple demos, without a click track. The band members worked with Andersson and Hansen on total of 12 songs, with a plan on working on a total of 16-18 songs and choosing the 12 best ones. They were adding new parts to the existing songs, especially the new set of lyrics in almost every song. The band recorded those songs in a modern way, but they managed to keep the feel, basic ideas, songwriting style and arrangements as much as possible from the period when those songs were written. Songs "Rock 'n' Roll Band" and "Dancing with the Moonlight" were recorded during those sessions. Later, the band paused the project because they didn't have enough time to finish it due to the rigorous touring schedule. In 2014 the band had 12 songs prepared for the project with a plan of releasing around 15 songs from the seventies and the eighties.

In 2010, the Scorpions announced their farewell tour. Before they retired, they wanted to release a bonus track album with leftovers from the seventies and eighties just for the fans. After playing the final show in Munich in December 2012, the band planned to take a break and go on vacation. In January 2013, MTV contacted the band and asked if they were interested in doing the MTV Unplugged album. They agreed on doing that project and it turned out to be successful. That whole thing pushed back the bonus track project. As soon as they finished the MTV Unplugged project, the band immediately went back to the studio to work on the bonus track project. The band was listening to the recordings they had already prepared for the project. They were happy with the result and Rudolf Schenker said that he had a tape with some songs that they could also use for this project. While searching for the tape, Schenker found an old ledger in which his mother enumerated the loans that his father provided to him, so he could buy all the equipment and establish the band. He looked into the book and it said: "September, 1965". He went back to the studio and told the band what he had found and their manager said that it would be great idea to celebrate 50th Anniversary since they were the only German band who was 50 years in music and one of the few in the world, along with The Rolling Stones, Status Quo, The Who, Beach Boys and Pink Floyd. The manager suggested to the band that they contact the promoters and see if they were interested in the band doing a 50th Anniversary Tour. Then Schenker suggested that if the band was going to do a 50th Anniversary Tour, then the band needed to release a brand new studio album. So the band went again into the listening process of bonus track material they had already prepared to see if they could improve something, like choruses and riffs. After that, they re-recorded the old stuff and started to write new songs with the producers Mikael Nord Andersson and Martin Hansen. The result was the album Return to Forever.

Until the end of 2014, the band had around 30 new written songs. When the band took the album to the record label, they had 19 songs that they wanted to do double album. The record label rejected the idea of the double album because they needed bonus tracks for different markets. So the band could only pick 12 songs that would go to the main track listing.

== About the tracks ==
- "Going Out With a Bang" is a new song written by Mikael Nord Andersson and Martin Hansen. It is about the triumph of friendship between band members and their survival through all 50 years and all the ups and downs in their careers. Klaus Meine said: "We are still standing strong and we are going out with a bang, yeah!". It is influenced a bit by blues.
- "We Built This House" is also a new song and songwriting collaboration between Klaus Meine, Andersson and Hansen. It is about a relationship, but also about the band's past fifty years, their philosophy, and lessons their unusual life taught them. Klaus Meine explained: "In the end, it tells our story. We’ve built this house called Scorpions brick by brick and often quite arduously. From the first days in Hannover, the first concerts abroad, until this very day. We’ve weathered severe storms, but the house withstood everything and turned out to be weatherproof and stable. However, building the house was never just cumbersome, but joyful as well. The joy of music, the joy of having experienced and still experiencing it all, the joy of – and the thankfulness for – the fans’ affection. We have been working hard for this dream, but we’re thankful as well for having been able to live it, and for still being able to live it today". The song has a chorus which comes after the verse and again one more chorus after the chorus.
- "Rock My Car" is a song that originates from 1985. It's about driving a fast car on the German Autobahn. Rudolf Schenker came on the idea for the song after the band came home from the long tour where they were traveling in planes and limousines. He just wanted to get into his car and push the "pedal to the metal".
- "House of Cards" is a song for which Schenker wrote music in 1998/99. and then Meine wrote lyrics for it in 2001. Originally, they wanted to put this song on the live album Acoustica (2001). Lyrically, it is about love and when love turns to hate.
- "All for One" is a song about the band's philosophy and friendship.
- "Rock 'n' Roll Band" is a song about sex, drugs, and rock 'n' roll and about nightlife in Los Angeles. Meine was inspired to write lyrics when he was walking down Sunset Boulevard and when he went to all the night clubs, including Rainbow and strip clubs seeing girls dancing to the Scorpions' music.
- "Catch Your Luck and Play" is a song that was written in 1986/87. and it was supposed to go on the album Savage Amusement (1988). Originally, it was called "Bite of the Snake" and almost made on the album's final track listing, but it didn't make it due to the weak chorus and weak hook line, even though it had a great opening riff. In collaboration with Andersson and Hansen, Schenker wrote a new chorus for the song. Lyrically, the song has a rock 'n' roll kind of theme. Explaining the theme of the song, Meine said: "No matter what comes my way, tomorrow is a brand new day. And we go for it".
- "Rollin' Home" is a new song. Hansen started to write lyrics for the song by himself and then, later, he and Meine finished the lyrics together. Hansen was inspired to write lyrics when Meine told him a story of how Scorpions travelled to concerts in an old beat-up van in the early seventies, in a period when American drummer Joe Wyman was in the band and how they had a traffic accident with the van in which they, luckily, all survived.
- "Hard Rockin' the Place" is a song that originates from the beginning of [the] eighties. It's a song that the band always had on their demo CD. Band members often picked this song for their albums, but every time they tried the song, it never fit any of the albums. But with the help of Andersson and Hansen, they found the right way it would fit on the album.
- "Eye of the Storm" is a song that was written around 1991. The band would occasionally pick the song for their albums, including Humanity: Hour I (2007), but it didn't make it on this album because the band was working with different composing teams and had plenty of other songs, so this song couldn't fit on it. Lyrically, [the] song is about writing a postcard home after a long tour.
- "The Scratch" is [the] last song written for the album and it was written around October 2014, right before the band had finished with the recording of the album. It's a swing kind of song and it very influenced by Benny Goodman and it has 18 different guitar lines, which were all recorded on the same day.
- "Gypsy Life" is a song that was written in 1999 and was supposed to go on the live album Acoustica (2001). It's about living life on the road, missing the life on the road after being at home for a long time, and then going back on the road again.
- "The World We Used to Know" is a political song written in 2014. It is inspired by the conflicts that happened around the world in 2014, including the ones in Gaza Strip and Ukraine. Klaus Meine explained: "I thought, we all go backwards in time, you know. And I hope we will have a chance to go forward, saying right now it feels like it's a long way to go to find the world we used to know. And the world we used to know is the world we have known for the past 25 years".
- "Dancing with the Moonlight" originates from a demo recorded during the Savage Amusement (1988) era called "Dancing In the Moonlight". It's a song about an airplane trip that occurred on Meine's birthday in 2009 when The Scorpions toured Russian Far East with Alice Cooper and Kingdom Come. While in the air, the airplane went through thunderstorm and in one moment started going down. Klaus Meine said: "I wrote the song about it "Dancing with the Moonlight", because our plane was dancing with the moonlight, going through these rough thunderstorms, but we survived."
- "When the Truth is a Lie" is a song that is in the vein of the songs "China White" from Blackout (1982) and the title song from Animal Magnetism (1980).
- "Who We Are" is a song that was written in 2014. It's in the tradition of the band The Who and with a length of 2:33 it's one of the shortest songs ever written by Klaus Meine and he described this song as a "nice song that you can throw in". The song features backing vocals by Andersson and Hansen and it's about a relationship, but it can be also interpreted as a song about the songwriter partnership between Meine and Schenker.
- "Delirious" is [a] song that originates from 1984/85 and it never made it onto any of the Scorpions albums because it's an experimental kind of a song and it has a dance rhythm. It was influenced by the album Physical Graffiti (1975) by Led Zeppelin.
- "One and One Is Three" is a song that Schenker started to write on Christmas, 2012 with Scorpions's road manager Clifford Gauntlett. Gauntlett came up with the title of the song and he said that the title describes perfectly what synergy is. He and Schenker started to write some of the lyrics in the third verse. Later, Schenker finished the song with his guitar technician Peter Kirkman and producers Andersson and Hansen. Lyrically, [the] song talks about how everything is possible to achieve when you truly believe in it.
- "Crazy Ride" is a song that originates from the late seventies. Lyrically, [the] song is about fifty years of the Scorpions, from their early days to days of international success. The line "A nameless band back in '65" is a reference to Scorpions's original band name "Nameless" that Schenker gave back in 1965 when he established the band.

== Release and promotion ==
On 16 August 2014 Scorpions released through their social media a promotional picture with which they announced a new studio album and 50th Anniversary Tour for 2015. On 19 December 2014 the band announced album title, artwork, and track listing for standard, deluxe edition and iTunes version of the album. On the same day, first single "We Built This House" was released as an Instant Grat on iTunes Store and Amazon MP3. On 19 February 2015, there was a 50th Anniversary and "Return to Forever" album release party held in Hamburg. The release party was video streamed live on The Scorpions' official website on 19 February 2015 at 8.30 pm C.E.T. After the exclusive pre-listening of the new album together with Klaus Meine, Rudolf Schenker and Matthias Jabs, the band answered questions by fans and media partners and shared intimate insights and stories around the creation of the new record. The album was available for pre-order via Amazon and it released on 20 February 2015 as a standard album, deluxe edition containing four bonus tracks, a double heavyweight vinyl and as a limited edition collector's boxset containing deluxe version of the album, an exclusive "Return to Forever" t-shirt, a 7" picture vinyl single, signed autograph card, USB, fan pass and an audiobook. "Eye of the Storm" was released as a second single on 8 May 2015 worldwide, except in North America. It was released as a digital download featuring the radio edit and album version of the song. Release date for first single "We Built This House", and release date and track listing for the album "Return to Forever" in North America were announced on 16 June 2015. On the same day, pre-orders started for the album. The first single "We Built This House" was released digitally on 3 July 2015, as an Instant Grat for the fans who pre-ordered the album on Amazon and iTunes. In United States "We Built This House" reached No. 10 on U.S. "Classic Rock" radio chart. On 15 July 2015, lyrics video for the song premiered in North America on Rolling Stone official website. Music video for the song premiered in North America on 11 August 2015 on Eddie Trunk's official website. Announcements related to the release of the "Going Out With a Bang" single and music video in Europe were released on 18 August 2015 along with the video teaser. On 21 August 2015, "Going Out With a Bang" was released as a single in Europe. On the same day, the music video for the song was released in Europe. Directed by Dennis Dirksen, the music video was shot during the concerts in Barcelona, Spain, and Maidstone, England. On 14 October 2015, Guitar Player premiered the music video for the "Going Out With a Bang" in North America.

On 11 September 2015, the album was released in various formats, including digital, Deluxe CD, and vinyl containing 19 songs. Besides the four tracks previously found on the deluxe edition of the album "The World We Used to Know", "Dancing with the Moonlight", "When the Truth Is a Live" and "Who We Are", the North American version of the album contains three additional exclusive bonus track "Crazy Ride", "One and One Is Three" and "Delirious". The Scorpions have also launched an official D2C store with exciting offerings for fans featuring brand new t-shirt and sweatshirt designs coupled with the CD and Vinyl versions of the album. Each bundle had an exclusive custom-made fan poster that featured every fan's name on it who pre-ordered the album through the D2C store by 14 August 2015.

== Critical reception ==
Professional ratings
Review scores
Source	Rating
AllMusic	3.5/5 stars
The Arts Desk	2/5 stars
Blabbermouth.net	8/10
Classic Rock	3.5/5 stars
Kerrang!	3/5
Melodic	4.5/5 stars
PopMatters	7/10

Fred Thomas from AllMusic stated that "Return to Forever follows suit very much, with the 12 new songs here embodying the same over-the-top celebration and hedonistic revelry of a much younger Scorpions. At times the throwbacks are a little transparent". Ray Van Horn Jr. from Blabbermouth.net wrote about the album that "The SCORPIONS do their damnedest here, like they did on Sting in the Tail prior, to make believe they're living in a "World Wide Live" once again". Nick Hasted from Classic Rock wrote that "It’s 1984 forever for the Scorpions, a return to slick, semi-hard rock and power ballads". Arie van der Graaf from Melodic said that the Scorpions "haven't made an album as fresh as this one for years. With its razor-sharp guitars, great melodic harmonies and hymns they still rule as Germany's most successful rock band, miles ahead of good followers Edguy and Rammstein". Jedd Beaudoin from PopMatters concluded its review saying "We don’t know that this will be the final Scorpions LP, but if it is, the little band from Hanover will certainly have gone out with, as they say, a bang".

== Track listing ==
No.	Title	Lyrics	Music	Length
1.	"Going Out with a Bang"	Klaus Meine, Martin Hansen	Hansen, Mikael Nord Andersson	3:47
2.	"We Built This House"	Meine, Hansen	Hansen, Andersson	3:53
3.	"Rock My Car"	Meine	Rudolf Schenker	3:20
4.	"House of Cards"	Meine	Schenker	5:05
5.	"All for One"	Meine, Andersson, Hansen	Meine, Andersson, Hansen	2:58
6.	"Rock 'n' Roll Band"	Meine	Meine	3:54
7.	"Catch Your Luck and Play"	Meine, Andersson, Hansen	Schenker	3:33
8.	"Rollin' Home"	Meine, Hansen	Hansen, Andersson	4:03
9.	"Hard Rockin' the Place"	Meine	Schenker	4:06
10.	"Eye of the Storm"	Meine	Meine, Andersson, Hansen	4:27
11.	"The Scratch"	Andersson	Andersson, Hansen	3:41
12.	"Gypsy Life"	Meine	Schenker	4:51
Total length:				47:38

Limited deluxe edition
No.	Title	Lyrics	Music	Length
13.	"The World We Used to Know"	Meine	Meine	3:51
14.	"Dancing with the Moonlight"	Meine	Matthias Jabs	3:42
15.	"When the Truth Is a Lie"	Jabs	Jabs, Andersson, Hansen	4:27
16.	"Who We Are"	Meine	Meine	2:33

Japanese edition
No.	Title	Lyrics	Music	Length
13.	"One and One Is Three"	Clifford Gauntlett, Andersson, Hansen	Schenker, Andersson, Hansen	4:22
14.	"Crazy Ride"	Meine	Schenker	4:21

iTunes edition
No.	Title	Lyrics	Music	Length
13.	"The World We Used to Know"			3:51
14.	"Dancing with the Moonlight"			3:42
15.	"When the Truth Is a Lie"			4:27
16.	"Who We Are"			2:33
17.	"Delirious"	Meine	Schenker	2:58
18.	"We Built This House" (Lyrics Video)			3:55
19.	"Return to Forever – Track-by-Track Interview"			22:47
20.	"Return to Forever – Generic Interview (English)"			31:36

Japanese limited deluxe edition
No.	Title	Length
13.	"The World We Used to Know"	3:51
14.	"Dancing with the Moonlight"	3:42
15.	"When the Truth Is a Lie"	4:27
16.	"Who We Are"	2:33
17.	"One and One Is Three"	4:22
18.	"Crazy Ride"	4:21

US deluxe edition
No.	Title	Length
13.	"The World We Used to Know"	3:51
14.	"Dancing with the Moonlight"	3:42
15.	"When the Truth Is a Lie"	4:27
16.	"Who We Are"	2:33
17.	"Crazy Ride"	4:21
18.	"One and One Is Three"	4:22
19.	"Delirious"	2:58

== Personnel ==
Scorpions

- Klaus Meine – lead vocals
- Rudolf Schenker – rhythm guitar, backing vocals
- Matthias Jabs – lead guitar, backing vocals
- Paweł Mąciwoda – bass, backing vocals
- James Kottak – drums, backing vocals

Production

- Mikael Nord Andersson – production, engineering, mixing
- Martin Hansen – production, engineering, mixing
- Tim Eckhorst – cover artwork

== Charts ==
=== Weekly charts ===
Chart (2015)	Peak position
Argentine Albums (CAPIF)	14
Austrian Albums (Ö3 Austria)	11
Belgian Albums (Ultratop Flanders)	17
Belgian Albums (Ultratop Wallonia)	36
Canadian Albums (Billboard)	16
Czech Albums (ČNS IFPI)	18
Dutch Albums (Album Top 100)	39
Finnish Albums (Suomen virallinen lista)	7
French Albums (SNEP)	5
German Albums (Offizielle Top 100)	2
Greek Albums (IFPI)	5
Hungarian Albums (MAHASZ)	4
Italian Albums (FIMI)	28
Japanese Albums (Oricon)	26
Mexican Albums (Top 100 Mexico)	12
Portuguese Albums (AFP)	17
Scottish Albums (Official Charts)	29
Spanish Albums (Promusicae)	11
Swedish Albums (Sverigetopplistan)	17
Swiss Albums (Schweizer Hitparade)	2
UK Albums (Official Charts)	31
UK Rock & Metal Albums (Official Charts)	4
US Billboard 200	65
US Top Rock Albums (Billboard)	7
US Top Hard Rock Albums (Billboard)	11

=== Year-end charts ===
Chart (2015)	Position
Belgian Albums (Ultratop Wallonia)	163
French Albums (SNEP)	78
German Albums (Offizielle Top 100)	95

== Certifications ==
Region	Certification	Certified units/sales
France (SNEP)	Gold	50,000^{‡}
Poland (ZPAV)	Gold	10,000^{‡}
Russia (NFPF)	Platinum	10,000^{*}
^{*} Sales figures based on certification alone.^{‡} Sales+streaming figures based on certification alone.
