= Pure Instinct =

- Cover photo by Gered Mankowitz

Studio album by Scorpions
- Released: 21 May 1996
- Studios: Scorpio Sound Studio, Hannover, Germany; Wisseloord Studios, Hilversum, Netherlands; Magic Moments Studio, New York City, New York, US; Goodnight LA, Los Angeles, California, US
- Genre: Hard rock
- Length: 51:04
- Label: East West (International) · Atlantic (US)
- Producers: Erwin Musper; Keith Olsen; Scorpions

Scorpions chronology
Face the Heat (1993)	Pure Instinct (1996)	Eye II Eye (1999)

Singles from Pure Instinct
- 1. "You and I" / "She's Knocking at My Door" Released: 1996; 2. "Does Anyone Know" / "Stone in My Shoe (live)" Released: 1996; 3. "Wild Child" Released: 1996 (US only); 4. "When You Came into My Life" Released: 1996; 5. "Where the River Flows" Released: 1997

Alternative cover photo by Michel Comte

Professional ratings
Review scores
Source	Rating
AllMusic	2/5 stars
Collector's Guide to Heavy Metal	4/10
Metal Hammer (GER)	5/7
Rock Hard	7.0/10
Music Waves (FRA)	2/5

Pure Instinct is the thirteenth studio album by the German hard rock band Scorpions, released in 1996. The album received mixed reviews from critics, with many criticizing it for having too many ballads and not enough hard rock songs.

The cover art for this album, as with several earlier Scorpions albums, was replaced with an alternative cover for some releases due to the nudity on the original cover. This is the only Scorpions album that does not feature an official drummer, released following the departure of Herman Rarebell before the recording sessions. The band hired session musician Curt Cress as drummer for the album. The song "You and I" gained some popularity and was often played in Scorpions concerts.

== Track listing ==
All lyrics are written by Klaus Meine, except "When You Came into My Life" by Meine, Rudolf Schenker, Titiek Puspa and James F. Sundah.

No.	Title	Music	Length
1.	"Wild Child"	Schenker	4:19
2.	"But the Best for You"	Meine	5:26
3.	"Does Anyone Know"	Meine	6:03
4.	"Stone in My Shoe"	Schenker	4:42
5.	"Soul Behind the Face"	Schenker	4:01
6.	"Oh Girl (I Wanna Be with You)"	Schenker	3:56
7.	"When You Came into My Life"	Meine, Schenker, Puspa, Sundah	5:13
8.	"Where the River Flows"	Schenker	4:16
9.	"Time Will Call Your Name"	Schenker	3:21
10.	"You and I"	Meine	6:16
11.	"Are You the One?"	Schenker	3:15

Japanese edition bonus track
No.	Title	Music	Length
12.	"She's Knocking at My Door"	Schenker	3:21

Pure Instinct single-only tracks
No.	Title	Writer(s)	Length
1.	"Kiss of Borrowed Time" (from the "When You Came into My Life" CD-single)	Meine	3:39
2.	"You and I" (special single mix from the "You and I" CD-single)	Meine	4:21

"Time Will Call Your Name" is 3:56 in length on European releases.

== Personnel ==
Scorpions

- Klaus Meine – lead vocals
- Rudolf Schenker – rhythm guitar, 6 & 12-string acoustic guitars, EBow, backing vocals
- Matthias Jabs – lead guitar, rhythm guitar, 6 & 12-string acoustic guitars, slide guitar
- Ralph Rieckermann – bass

Additional musicians

- Curt Cress – drums, percussion
- Pitti Hecht – percussion
- Luke Herzog, Koen van Bael – keyboards

Production

- Erwin Musper – producer, engineer, mixing
- Keith Olsen – producer on track 1
- Evelien Tjebbes, Attie Bauw, Peter Kirkman – assistant engineers
- David Foster – producer, arranger, keyboards on track 7 (uncredited on this album, but credited on single)
- Claude Gaudette – keyboards on track 7 (uncredited on this album, but credited on single)
- David Reitzas, Felipe Elgueta – engineers on track 7 (uncredited on this album, but credited on single)
- Chris Lord-Alge – mixing on track 7 (uncredited on this album, but credited on single)
- George Marino – mastering at Sterling Sound, New York

== Charts ==
Chart (1996)	Peak position
Austrian Albums (Ö3 Austria)	20
Belgian Albums (Ultratop Wallonia)	37
Dutch Albums (Album Top 100)	95
Finnish Albums (Suomen virallinen lista)	10
French Albums (SNEP)	11
German Albums (Offizielle Top 100)	8
Hungarian Albums (MAHASZ)	14
Japanese Albums (Oricon)	28
Norwegian Albums (VG-lista)	4
Swedish Albums (Sverigetopplistan)	38
Swiss Albums (Schweizer Hitparade)	15
UK Rock & Metal Albums (Official Charts)	18
US Billboard 200	99

== Certifications ==
Region	Certification	Certified units/sales
Finland (Musiikkituottajat)	Gold	25,000
France (SNEP)	Gold	100,000^{*}
Germany (BVMI)	Gold	250,000^{^}
Indonesia	Platinum	50,000
Malaysia	6× Platinum	150,000
Portugal (AFP)	Gold	20,000^{^}
Singapore (RIAS)	Gold	10,000
South Korea (KMCA)	Gold	15,000
Thailand	Platinum	50,000
^{*} Sales figures based on certification alone.^{^} Shipments figures based on certification alone.
