= Crazy World Tour =

2017–20 concert tour by the Scorpions

- Tour by Scorpions
- Location: Europe, North America, Oceania, Asia and South America
- Associated album: Crazy World
- Start date: June 6, 2017
- End date: March 4, 2020
- Legs: 14
- No. of shows: 133 (2017: 37; 2018: 48; 2019: 41; 2020: 6)

Scorpions concert chronology
- 50th Anniversary World Tour (2015–2016); Crazy World Tour (2017–2020); Rock Believer Tour (2022–2023)

The Crazy World Tour was a concert tour by German rock band Scorpions, which started on 6 June 2017 in Montbéliard, France, and concluded on 4 March 2020 in Kallang, Singapore. It is not to be confused with the similarly titled 1990–1991 tour in support of the band's eleventh studio album Crazy World.

== Background ==
On 22 March 2017, Scorpions officially announced the "Crazy World Tour" and the North American dates. They also announced Megadeth as their opening act for that leg. With this tour, the band is continuing to celebrate their more than 50 years in the music business. Commenting on the tour, Klaus Meine stated: "When our album Crazy World was released back in '91, right at the end of the Cold War, we toured around a world that was pretty crazy back then, but there was so much hope in the air for a more peaceful future. Now 26 years later, things are getting more crazy every other day. After all these years, 'Crazy World' is still a good motto for our upcoming world tour. We are very much looking forward to seeing all of you out there". On 7 October 2017, it was announced that concerts on 8 October in Phoenix, Arizona, on 11 October in San Antonio, Texas, 12 October in Dallas, Texas, 14 October in Fort Lauderdale, Florida, and on 15 October 2017 in Tampa, Florida would be cancelled due to Klaus Meine's severe laryngitis. Meine had been advised by otorhinolaryngologist in Los Angeles to rest his voice, because he could risk permanent vocal damage. On 7 November 2017, the band announced concerts for the spring of 2018 in France and the Netherlands.

== Critical reception ==
John J. Moser from The Morning Call for the concert in Santander Arena in Reading, Pennsylvania said that "In a 95-minute set of 12 songs that kicked off Scorpions' latest U.S. tour, the group was not perfect. At 69, singer Klaus Meine's voice still is amazing, but has started to show a tattered edge here and there. Also as 69, guitarist Rudolf Schenker carried few of the leads – though he was solid when he did and was impressively energetic. But what really carried the night was Scorpions' screaming yet melodic rock – its guitar attack like no other band." Joe Divita from Loudwire said that performance in Madison Square Garden was "just as driving and anthemic as any of their biggest hits". He also added that "they visibly have a blast onstage and when you're having this much fun, how could you stop? Why would you want to? One day, the band will inevitably call it a day for good, but until then, we'll turn up each time, cherishing the opportunity as the number of artists from this era dwindle".

Chris Bubinas from Exclaim! said about the concert in Place Bell in Laval that "Vocalist Klaus Meine, seeming immune to the hands of time, provided vocals that were absolutely flawless as he patrolled and poured himself into the crowd". Bob Gendron from Chicago Tribune said about the concert in Allstate Arena in Chicago that "Akin to many of the fans who sang along to nearly every word and occasionally filled in for Meine, the German quintet continues to cling to the straightforward identity it's projected for most of its 52-year career". Kari Kenner from Daily Herald commented about the concert in Salt Lake City that "Anyone who saw the German rockers on their previous two visits to USANA Amphitheatre in 2010 and 2012 as part of an announced farewell tour had to have an inkling — or at least an intense hope — that retirement wouldn't stick. The band simply had too much left in the tank from a live standpoint to think about exchanging their leather pants and jackets for stay-at-home loungewear". Azaria Podplesky from The Spokesman-Review about concert in Spokane Arena said "Judging by the smiles on the face of each musician as they waved goodbye and tossed picks and drumsticks into the crowd, it's safe to say Scorpions enjoyed the trip down memory lane as much as fans did".

== Tour dates ==
Date	City	Country	Venue	Supporting act
Europe
6 June 2017	Montbéliard	France	Axone	—
9 June 2017	Norje	Sweden	Sweden Rock Festival	—
11 June 2017	Rüsselsheim	Germany	Hessentag	—
18 June 2017	Dessel	Belgium	Graspop Metal Meeting	—
24 June 2017	Oświęcim	Poland	Life Festival	—
12 July 2017	Torrelavega	Spain	Campos del Malecon	—
14 July 2017	Mérida	Spain	Albergue Municipal Juvenil El Prado	—
15 July 2017	Vila Nova de Gaia	Portugal	Festival Marés Vivas	—
17 July 2017	Nîmes	France	Festival de Nîmes	—
19 July 2017	Saint-Julien-en-Genevois	France	Guitare en Scene Festival	—
23 July 2017	Ulm	Germany	Münsterplatz	—
North America
14 September 2017	Reading	United States	Santander Arena	Megadeth
16 September 2017	New York City	United States	Madison Square Garden	Megadeth
19 September 2017	Laval	Canada	Place Bell	Megadeth
22 September 2017	Toronto	Canada	Budweiser Stage	Megadeth
23 September 2017	Rosemont	United States	Allstate Arena	Megadeth
25 September 2017	Broomfield	United States	1stBank Center	Megadeth
26 September 2017	West Valley City	United States	USANA Amphitheatre	Megadeth
29 September 2017	Spokane	United States	Spokane Arena	Megadeth
30 September 2017	Tacoma	United States	Tacoma Dome	Megadeth
3 October 2017	Reno	United States	Grand Sierra Resort	Megadeth
4 October 2017	Oakland	United States	Oracle Arena	Megadeth
7 October 2017	Inglewood	United States	The Forum	Megadeth
Eurasia
28 October 2017	Sochi	Russia	Shayba Arena	—
30 October 2017	Krasnodar	Russia	Basket-Hall Krasnodar	—
1 November 2017	Moscow	Russia	Olympiiskiy	—
3 November 2017	St. Petersburg	Russia	Ice Palace	—
5 November 2017	Nizhny Novgorod	Russia	Nagorny Arena	—
7 November 2017	Ufa	Russia	Ufa Arena	—
9 November 2017	Ekaterinburg	Russia	KRK Uralets	—
11 November 2017	Kyiv	Ukraine	Sports Palace	—
22 November 2017	Oslo	Norway	Oslo Spektrum	—
24 November 2017	Gothenburg	Sweden	Scandinavium	—
25 November 2017	Stockholm	Sweden	Ericsson Globe Arena	—
27 November 2017	Helsinki	Finland	Hartwall Arena	—
29 November 2017	Copenhagen	Denmark	Royal Arena	—
1 December 2017	Gdańsk	Poland	Ergo Arena	—
22 March 2018	Nantes	France	Zénith Nantes Métropole	—
24 March 2018	Cournon-d'Auvergne	France	Zénith d'Auvergne	—
26 March 2018	Limoges	France	Zénith de Limoges Métropole	—
28 March 2018	Toulon	France	Zénith Oméga de Toulon	—
30 March 2018	Rouen	France	Zénith de la Métropole	—
2 April 2018	Amsterdam	Netherlands	Ziggo Dome	—
4 April 2018	Brussels	Belgium	Forest National	—
7 April 2018	Tashkent	Uzbekistan	Istiklol Concert Hall	—
North America				—
29 April 2018	Tijuana	Mexico	Fronterizo Fest	—
2 May 2018	Monterrey	Mexico	Citibanamex Auditorium	—
4 May 2018	Mexico City	Mexico	Hell & Heaven Metal Fest	—
6 May 2018	Guadalajara	Mexico	Telemex Auditorium	—
Europe / Israel
6 June 2018	Ostrava	Czech Republic	Ostravar Aréna	—
8 June 2018	Ljubljana	Slovenia	Arena Stožice	—
10 June 2018	Belgrade	Serbia	Kombank Arena	—
12 June 2018	Bucharest	Romania	Romexpo	—
16 June 2018	London	England	O2 Arena	Megadeth
24 June 2018	Amnéville	France	Galaxie	—
26 June 2018	Paris	France	AccorHotels Arena	—
28 June 2018	Saint-Vulbas	France	Polo Club de la Plaine de l'Ain	—
30 June 2018	Rennes	France	Le Liberte	—
4 July 2018	Las Palmas de Gran Canaria	Spain	Gran Canaria Arena	—
7 July 2018	Barcelona	Spain	Rock Fest Barcelona	—
11 July 2018	Oeiras	Portugal	Estádio Municipal de Oeiras	The Dead Daisies
13 July 2018	Viveiro	Spain	Resurrection Fest	—
16 July 2018	Athens	Greece	Panathenaic Stadium	Athens State Orchestra
19 July 2018	Tel Aviv	Israel	Menora Mivtachim Arena	—
21 July 2018	Locarno	Switzerland	Piazza Grande	—
23 July 2018	Verona	Italy	Arena di Verona	—
25 July 2018	Salem	Germany	Schule Schloss Salem	—
27 July 2018	Ludwigsburg	Germany	Ludwigsburg Palace	—
29 July 2018	Łódź	Poland	Atlas Arena	—
1 August 2018	Colmar	France	Foire Aux Vins	—
3 August 2018	Bad Kissingen	Germany	Luitpoldpark	—
North America
31 August 2018	Stateline	United States	Lake Tahoe Outdoor Arena	Queensrÿche
2 September 2018	Irvine	United States	FivePoint Amphitheater	Queensrÿche
5 September 2018	Phoenix	United States	Comerica Theatre	Queensrÿche
7 September 2018	San Antonio	United States	Freeman Coliseum	Queensrÿche
9 September 2018	Irving	United States	Toyota Music Factory	Queensrÿche
12 September 2018	Hollywood	United States	Seminole Hard Rock Hotel and Casino	Queensrÿche
14 September 2018	Tampa	United States	Amalie Arena	Queensrÿche
Asia
27 October 2018	Beirut	Lebanon	Seaside Arena	Rodge
Oceania
2 November 2018	Perth	Australia	RAC Arena	Def Leppard
4 November 2018	Adelaide	Australia	Adelaide Entertainment Centre	Def Leppard
6 November 2018	Brisbane	Australia	Brisbane Entertainment Centre	Def Leppard
12 November 2018	Auckland	New Zealand	Spark Arena	Def Leppard
Asia
17 November 2018	Beijing	China	Olympic Sports Center Gymnasium	—
21 November 2018	Shanghai	China	Mercedes-Benz Arena	—
North America
26 January 2019	Durant	United States	Choctaw Casino	—
Europe
9 February 2019	Limassol	Cyprus	Spyros Kyprianou Athletic Center	—
14 June 2019	Fuengirola	Spain	Rock the Coast Festival	—
20 June 2019	Regensburg	Germany	Donau Arena	—
22 June 2019	Copenhagen	Denmark	Copenhell	—
26 June 2019	Lisbon	Portugal	Altice Arena	—
28 June 2019	Madrid	Spain	Download Festival	—
5 July 2019	Tours	France	American Tours Festival	—
7 July 2019	Albi	France	Festival Pause Guitare	—
14 July 2019	Aix-les-Bains	France	Festival Musilac	—
16 July 2019	Saint-Malô-du-Bois	France	Festival de Poupet	—
19 July 2019	Rosenheim	Germany	Rosenheim Sommerfestival	—
21 July 2019	Gliwice	Poland	Gliwice Arena	—
23 July 2019	Gdańsk	Poland	Ergo Arena	—
27 July 2019	Lucca	Italy	Lucca Summer Festival	—
2 August 2019	Klam	Austria	Clam Rock Festival	—
4 August 2019	Lokeren	Belgium	Lokerse Feesten	—
6 August 2019	Schaffhausen	Switzerland	Stars in Town Festival	—
11 August 2019	Derbyshire	England	Bloodstock Open Air	—
14 August 2019	Avenches	Switzerland	Rock Oz'Arènes	—
16 August 2019	Fulda	Germany	Fulda Cathedral Square	—
18 August 2019	Bonn	Germany	Kunstrasen Bonn	—
South America
18 September 2019	Curitiba	Brazil	Pedreira Paulo Leminski	Whitesnake; Europe
21 September 2019	São Paulo	Brazil	Rockfest 2019; Allianz Parque	Whitesnake; Helloween; Europe; Armored Dawn
23 September 2019	Uberlândia	Brazil	Ginásio Municipal Tancredo Neves	Whitesnake; Helloween
25 September 2019	Brasília	Brazil	Ginásio Nilson Nelson	Whitesnake; Helloween
28 September 2019	Florianópolis	Brazil	Arena Petry	Helloween
1 October 2019	Porto Alegre	Brazil	Arena do Grêmio	Whitesnake; Helloween
4 October 2019	Rio de Janeiro	Brazil	Barra Olympic Park	Iron Maiden; Helloween; Sepultura
7 October 2019	Santiago	Chile	Movistar Arena	Whitesnake
10 October 2019	Bogotá	Colombia	Movistar Arena	Whitesnake
Europe
31 October 2019	Yekaterinburg	Russia	Uralets Sports Palace	—
3 November 2019	Krasnodar	Russia	Basket Hall	—
5 November 2019	Moscow	Russia	VTB Arena	—
7 November 2019	Saint Petersburg	Russia	SKK Ice Palace	—
10 November 2019	Voronezh	Russia	Ubileyniy Sports Palace	—
12 November 2019	Kyiv	Ukraine	Kyiv Sports Palace	—
15 November 2019	Minsk	Belarus	Minsk Arena	—
18 November 2019	Budapest	Hungary	László Papp Sport Arena	—
20 November 2019	Bratislava	Slovakia	Ondrej Nepela Winter Stadium	—
Oceania
19 February 2020	Melbourne	Australia	Rod Laver Arena	Whitesnake
26 February 2020	Sydney	Australia	Qudos Bank Arena	Whitesnake
Asia
1 March 2020	Yogyakarta	Indonesia	Kridosono Stadium	Whitesnake
4 March 2020	Kallang	Singapore	Fort Canning Park	Whitesnake

== Cancelled shows ==
List of cancelled concerts, showing date, city, country, and venue
Date	City	Country	Venue	Ref.
8 October 2017	Phoenix	United States	Talking Stick Resort Arena	
11 October 2017	San Antonio	United States	Freeman Coliseum	
12 October 2017	Dallas	United States	The Pavilion at the Irving Music Factory	
14 October 2017	Sunrise	United States	BB&T Center	
15 October 2017	Tampa	United States	Amalie Arena	
3 December 2017	Ostrava	Czech Republic	Ostravar Arena	
5 December 2017	Ljubljana	Slovenia	Arena Stožice	
7 December 2017	Belgrade	Serbia	Štark Arena	
8 November 2018	Melbourne	Australia	Rod Laver Arena	
10 November 2018	Sydney	Australia	International Convention Centre	
12 October 2019	Quito	Ecuador	Coliseo General Rumiñahui	
24 February 2020	Brisbane	Australia	Brisbane Entertainment Centre	
27 February 2020	Auckland	New Zealand	Spark Arena	
7 March 2020	Pasay	Philippines	Mall of Asia Arena	

== Personnel ==
- Klaus Meine – lead vocals
- Rudolf Schenker – rhythm guitar, backing vocals
- Matthias Jabs – lead guitar, backing vocals
- Paweł Mąciwoda – bass, backing vocals
- Mikkey Dee – drums, percussion
