= 50th Anniversary World Tour =

2015–16 concert tour by the Scorpions

- Tour by Scorpions
- Promotional poster for the tour
- Location: Asia, Europe, North America, Oceania, South America
- Associated album: Return to Forever
- Start date: May 1, 2015
- End date: December 2, 2016
- Legs: 16
- No. of shows: 126
- Box office: $48,600,000 (According to Pollstar)

Scorpions concert chronology
- Get Your Sting and Blackout World Tour (2010–2014); 50th Anniversary World Tour (2015–2016); Crazy World Tour (2017–2020)

The 50th Anniversary World Tour (or sometimes called Return to Forever Tour) was a worldwide tour by German rock band Scorpions. It started on 1 May 2015 in Zhenjiang and finished in Berlin on 2 December 2016. It was in the support of band's eighteenth studio album Return to Forever and it was also celebration of band's fifty years in music business. Tour was ranked by Pollstar at No. 79 at their "Top 100 Worldwide Tour" chart for 2015 with total gross of $22,400,000 and total of 375.576 tickets sold from 51 concerts. It was also ranged by Pollstar at No. 68 at their "Top 100 Worldwide Tour" chart for 2016 with total gross of $26,200,000 and total of 383,398 tickets sold from 59 concerts. It was, also, the last Scorpions worldwide tour to feature James Kottak and first worldwide tour to feature Mikkey Dee as a band's official drummer.

== Background ==
In 2010 Scorpions announced farewell tour. Before they retire, they wanted to release a bonus track album from leftovers from seventies and eighties just for the fans. After playing the final show in Munich in December 2012, band planned to take a break and go on vacation. In January 2013, MTV contacted the band and asked if they are interested in doing the MTV Unplugged album. They agreed on doing that project and turned out to be successful. That whole thing pushed back the bonus track project. As soon as they have finished the MTV Unplugged project, band immediately went back to studio to work on bonus track project. Band was listening the recordings they have already prepared for the project. They were happy with the result and Rudolf Schenker said that he has a tape with some songs that they could also use for this project. While searching for the tape, Schenker found an old ledger in which his mother enumerated the loans that his father provided to him, so he could buy all the equipment and establish the band. He looked into the book and it said: "September, 1965". He went back to the studio and told the band what he found and their manager said that it would be great idea to celebrate 50th Anniversary since they are the only German band who is 50 years in music and one of the few in the world along with The Rolling Stones, The Who, Beach Boys and Pink Floyd. Manager suggested to the band that they contact the promoters and see if they were interested in the band doing the 50th Anniversary Tour. Then Schenker suggested that if the band was going to do a 50th Anniversary Tour, then the band needed to release a brand new studio album. So the band went again into the listening process of bonus track material that they had already prepared and see if they could improve something, like choruses and riffs. After that, they re-recorded the old stuff and started to write new songs with the producers Mikael Nord Andersson and Martin Hansen. The result was the album Return to Forever.

On 16 August 2014 Scorpions released through their social media a promotional picture with which they announced 50th Anniversary Tour and new studio album for 2015. On 18 December 2014, band announced 2015 spring and summer European tour dates as well as German tour dates for the March 2016. North American dates for September and October 2016 with special quest Queensrÿche were announced on 16 June 2015, on very same day when were released North American release dates for the album Return to Forever (2015) and first single "We Built This House". On 1 May 2015, band performed on Changjiang International Music Festival in front of 100,000 people, making this their first performance in China in their career. Between 13 and 21 May 2016, Scorpions have performed their first time ever concert residency at The Joint in Las Vegas. Originally, the band received an offer to do a full month residency concert, but it didn't work out for various reasons, so the band was only able to perform five shows. On 18 October 2016, Scorpions performed in Palais Theatre in Melbourne, Australia, marking their first concert in Australia in their career. A concert in Bangkok scheduled for 26 October 2016 was cancelled because of the death of king Bhumibol Adulyadej.

== Stage and performances ==
Show set was designed by Günter Jäckle and Rainer Becker designed lighting. Manfred Nikitser, associated lighting designer and director also joined production team. Nikitser chose two GrandMA2 full-size desks, one grandMA2 light, 2 MA VPU plus MK2 video processing units, 2 MA NPU network processing units and 2 MA network switches. The lights used consist of 36 Clay Paky A.leda B-EYE K20s, 8 Sharpy Wash 330s, 10 Mythos units and 20 Stormy CCs. Stage design also consists of a big L.E.D. back screen, a set screen, and two IMAG screens. The set also has four crossbars and ladders. Stage also features flying platform with drum kit with the Sharpy Wash lights placed underneath. Nikister said that those lights were chosen because those lights are the best from point of compactness, high output and speed. PRG Nocturne provided all the equipment. MANIK Show Lighting and Manfred Nikitser managed the Lighting control console and MA VPUs. The visual content was dealt with by Hans-Otto Richter and Nikitser.

Every show started with a sound of sirens and curtain falling down. After that, band opened show with song "Going Out With a Bang" following with songs "Make It Real" and "The Zoo". During the performance of the song "The Zoo", Meine would tossing his cowbell drumsticks into the crowd. That song was followed by an instrumental "Coast to Coast" which lead to so-called "70's Medley" during which the band performed snippets of the songs "Top of the Bill", "Steamrock Fever", "Speedy's Coming" and "Catch Your Train". Medley was followed by performance of the song "We Built This House" and electric guitar instrumental "Delicate Dance" during which Matthias Jabs plays electric guitar with a guest guitar player, his technician, Ingo Powitzer. "Delicate Dance" was followed with an "Acoustic Medley" during which band plays acoustic versions of the songs "Always Somewhere", "Eye of the Storm" and "Send Me an Angel". That followed with "Wind of Change", "Rock 'n' Roll Band" and "Dynamite". After that James Kottak played his drum solo while his drum platform was risen above the stage. During his performance, pictures of all band's album covers were shown on the screen. When Kottak finished with his drum solo, band would return to stage to play "Blackout" during which Rudolf Schenker played electric guitar with dry ice dispenser. Band finished concert with "No One Like You" and "Big City Nights". After the concert was done, band return to stage to play "Still Loving You" and "Rock You Like a Hurricane". During the concert in Barclays Center In Brooklyn on 12 September 2015, 12-year old guitarist Brandon Niederauer joined the band on stage to play guitar on song "No One Like You".

== Live streaming and recordings ==
Scorpions teamed up with Yahoo! for their first global live streaming. Yahoo! streamed band's live performance on 12 September 2015 at 9:10 p.m. ET from Barclays Center in Brooklyn. Live streaming was available for desktop computers on Yahoo! Screen website and through Yahoo! Screen application for mobile devices with iOS and Android or connected devices (Apple TV, Roku, Xbox). On 22 April 2016, band released version of the album Return to Forever (2015) called Return to Forever: Tour Edition which has seven bonus tracks and two bonus DVD's. Those DVDs include full performances of the band on Barclays Center, full band's performance on Hellfest on 20 June 2015 and documentary called On the Road in America directed by Dennis Dirksen. Filmed in Los Angeles, Santa Barbara and Las Vegas, documentary takes a look at the group's impressive longevity and continued popularity in the United States.

== Klaus Meine health issues and departure of James Kottak ==
On 21 March 2016, 30 minutes into the concert at Barclaycard Arena in Hamburg, Klaus Meine complained of a sore throat. The band was forced to stop the concert and Meine was diagnosed with advanced viral infection and larynx and trachea inflammation, and as a result numerous shows in Germany were cancelled. Around that time, James Kottak went to Eric Claptons's Crossroads Centre in Antigua for one month of rehab treatment. While staying there, Kottak decided to remain for two more weeks, planning to return to the tour after treatment. Kottak ended up staying at Crossroads Centre for 92 days. Due to his extended absence, Mikkey Dee was called to replace Kottak on the upcoming tour dates. When Kottak was ready to return, the band realized that swapping the drummers' equipment would cost $25,000-$30,000; Kottak and the band agreed that Dee would finish rest of the tour, as there was a negligible amount of shows left. Following the tour, Kottak amicably left the band.

== Critical and commercial reception ==
Seb Male from The Edge said about the band's performance on Ramblin' Man Fair in 2015: " Scorpions were nearly half an hour late on stage, prompting some disappointed fans to head over to watch Camel on the Prog Stage instead, but when they finally did arrive they were definitely on form. Klaus Meine remains pitch-perfect after all these years". Jason MacNeil from Toronto Sun said about the concert in Molson Canadian Amphitheatre on 18 September 2015 that "it seems the band is running on fumes". Mark LePage from Montreal Gazette said about the concert in Bell Centre on 19 September 2015 that "At 67, Meine could easily have passed for a decade younger in both appearance and voice. Hell, the whole band was in fighting trim, from drummer James Kottak to guitarists Matthias Jabs and Rudolf Schenker. Metal makes old bones, and metal rules". Alan Cox from Denver Post said about the concert in Greenwood Village on 29 September 2015 that "It was symbolic of how, despite the many years of playing, the band is still out on the road and still giving their fans what they want–to be rocked like a hurricane". Raymond Ahner from National Rock Review gave positive review about concert SAP Center at San Jose on 1 October 2015 stating that "it was clear that even after fifty years, the Scorpions still know what it takes to deliver a big arena rock show". Cassandra Miasnikov from Santa Barbara Independent praised the show in Santa Barbara Bowl on 6 October 2015 by saying "The Scorpions proved that they deserve every bit of credit they've achieved as one of the most prominent and longest lasting rock bands in the world".

50th Anniversary World Tour was ranked by Pollstar at #79 at their "Top 100 Worldwide Tour" chart for 2015 with total gross of $22,400,000 and total of 375.576 tickets sold from 51 concerts. It was also ranged by Pollstar at #68 at their "Top 100 Worldwide Tour" chart for 2016 with total gross of $26,200,000 and total of 383.398 tickets sold from 59 concerts.

== Tour dates ==
Date	City	Country	Venue	Opening acts	Attendance	Revenue
Leg 1: Asia
1 May 2015	Zhenjiang	China	Chang Jiang International Music Festival	—N/a	—N/a	—N/a
Leg 2: Europe
8 May 2015	Pardubice	Czech Republic	Tipsport Arena	—N/a	—N/a	—N/a
9 May 2015	Łódź	Poland	Atlas Arena	—N/a	—N/a	—N/a
14 May 2015	Novosibirsk	Russia	Ice Sports Palace Sibir	—N/a	—N/a	—N/a
16 May 2015	Tyumen	Russia	Sports Palace Tyumen	—N/a	—N/a	—N/a
18 May 2015	Yekaterinburg	Russia	KRK Uralets	—N/a	—N/a	—N/a
20 May 2015	Perm	Russia	Universal Sports Palace Molot	—N/a	—N/a	—N/a
25 May 2015	Saint Petersburg	Russia	Ice Palace	—N/a	—N/a	—N/a
27 May 2015	Moscow	Russia	Olimpiyskiy Stadium	—N/a	—N/a	—N/a
29 May 2015	Ufa	Russia	Ufa Arena	—N/a	—N/a	—N/a
31 May 2015	Kazan	Russia	Tatneft Arena	—N/a	—N/a	—N/a
3 June 2015	Nizhny Novgorod	Russia	Trud Stadium	—N/a	—N/a	—N/a
5 June 2015	Voronezh	Russia	Ice Sports Palace Yubileyny	—N/a	—N/a	—N/a
7 June 2015	Krasnodar	Russia	Basket-Hall Krasnodar	—N/a	—N/a	—N/a
10 June 2015	Minsk	Belarus	Minsk-Arena	—N/a	—N/a	—N/a
20 June 2015	Clisson	France	Hellfest	—N/a	—N/a	—N/a
21 June 2015	Dessel	Belgium	Graspop Metal Meeting	—N/a	—N/a	—N/a
2 July 2015	Hérouville-Saint Clair	France	Festival Beauregard	—N/a	—N/a	—N/a
18 July 2015	Sion	Switzerland	Plaine de Tourbillon (with Gotthard)	—N/a	—N/a	—N/a
19 July 2015	Saint-Julien-en-Genevois	France	Guitare En Scène Festival	—N/a	—N/a	—N/a
23 July 2015	Barcelona	Spain	Barcelona Rock Fest	—N/a	—N/a	—N/a
25 July 2015	Maidstone	England	Ramblin' Man Fair (Mote Park)	—N/a	—N/a	—N/a
31 July 2015	Hamina	Finland	Bastioni	—N/a	—N/a	—N/a
1 August 2015	Jakobstad	Finland	Jakobstads Centralplan	—N/a	—N/a	—N/a
Leg 3: Asia
7 August 2015	Incheon	South Korea	Pentaport Rock Festival	—N/a	—N/a	—N/a
Leg 4: Europe
21 August 2015	Coburg	Germany	Schloßplatz	—N/a	—N/a	—N/a
Leg 5: North America
10 September 2015	Boston	United States	Leader Bank Pavilion	Queensrÿche	—N/a	—N/a
12 September 2015	Brooklyn	United States	Barclays Center	Queensrÿche	—N/a	—N/a
13 September 2015	Gilford	United States	Meadowbrook	Queensrÿche	3,454 / 7,348	$163,982
16 September 2015	Moncton	Canada	Moncton Coliseum	Queensrÿche	—N/a	—N/a
18 September 2015	Toronto	Canada	Molson Canadian Amphitheatre	Queensrÿche	—N/a	—N/a
19 September 2015	Montreal	Canada	Bell Centre	Queensrÿche	9,507 / 9,507	$514,128
22 September 2015	Columbus	United States	LC Pavilion	Queensrÿche	3,085 / 3,500	$122,553
23 September 2015	Cleveland	United States	Jacobs Pavilion at Nautica	Queensrÿche	—N/a	—N/a
25 September 2015	Windsor	Canada	Caesars Windsor	Queensrÿche	—N/a	—N/a
26 September 2015	Rosemont	United States	Allstate Arena	Queensrÿche	—N/a	—N/a
29 September 2015	Greenwood Village	United States	Fiddler's Green Amphitheatre	Queensrÿche	—N/a	—N/a
1 October 2015	San Jose	United States	SAP Center at San Jose	Queensrÿche	—N/a	—N/a
3 October 2015	Inglewood	United States	The Forum	Queensrÿche	10,572 / 10,572	$889,797
6 October 2015	Santa Barbara	United States	Santa Barbara Bowl	Queensrÿche	3,988 / 4,555	$311,675
7 October 2015	Las Vegas	United States	The Joint	Queensrÿche	2,920 / 2,920	$342,075
9 October 2015	Kent	United States	ShoWare Center	Queensrÿche	—N/a	—N/a
Leg 6: Europe
9 November 2015	Rome	Italy	PalaLottomatica	Rhapsody of Fire	—N/a	—N/a
11 November 2015	Milan	Italy	Mediolanum Forum	Gamma Ray	—N/a	—N/a
13 November 2015	Trieste	Italy	PalaTrieste	Rhapsody of Fire	—N/a	—N/a
21 November 2015	Lille	France	Zénith de Lille	Europe	—N/a	—N/a
22 November 2015	Antwerp	Belgium	Sportpaleis	Thunder	4,669 / 8,000	$247,944
24 November 2015	Paris	France	AccorHotels Arena	Europe	—N/a	—N/a
26 November 2015	Strasbourg	France	Zénith de Strasbourg	Europe	—N/a	—N/a
28 November 2015	Zürich	Switzerland	Hallenstadion	—N/a	—N/a	—N/a
30 November 2015	Lyon	France	Halle Tony Garnier	Europe	—N/a	—N/a
1 December 2015	Montpellier	France	Park&Suites Arena	Europe	—N/a	—N/a
3 December 2015	Bordeaux	France	Patinoire Meradeck	Europe	—N/a	—N/a
4 December 2015	Toulouse	France	Zenith	Europe	—N/a	—N/a
6 December 2015	Grenoble	France	Palais des Sports	Europe	—N/a	—N/a
8 December 2015	Geneve	Switzerland	Geneva Arena		—N/a	—N/a
Leg 7: Europe
17 February 2016	Odesa	Ukraine	Odesa Sports Palace	—N/a	—N/a	—N/a
19 February 2016	Kyiv	Ukraine	Palace of Sports	—N/a	—N/a	—N/a
22 February 2016	Riga	Latvia	Arena Riga	—N/a	—N/a	—N/a
24 February 2016	Kaunas	Lithuania	Žalgirio Arena	—N/a	—N/a	—N/a
27 February 2016	Prague	Czech Republic	O2 Arena	—N/a	—N/a	—N/a
29 February 2016	Budapest	Hungary	László Papp Budapest Sports Arena	—N/a	—N/a	—N/a
2 March 2016	Kosice	Slovakia	Steel Arena	—N/a	—N/a	—N/a
4 March 2016	Kraków	Poland	Tauron Arena	—N/a	—N/a	—N/a
12 March 2016	Esch-Sur-Alzette	Luxembourg	Rockhal	—N/a	—N/a	—N/a
14 March 2016	Stuttgart	Germany	Schleyerhalle	—N/a	—N/a	—N/a
16 March 2016	Munich	Germany	Olympiahalle	—N/a	—N/a	—N/a
18 March 2016	Dortmund	Germany	Westfalenhallen	—N/a	—N/a	—N/a
19 March 2016	Mannheim	Germany	SAP Arena	—N/a	—N/a	—N/a
21 March 2016	Hamburg	Germany	Barclaycard Arena	—N/a	6,444 / 9,905	$418,765
Leg 8: North America
6 May 2016	Concord	United States	Carolina Rebellion	—N/a	90,091/96,000	$5,063,330
7 May 2016	Atlanta	United States	Chastain Park Amphitheater	—N/a	—N/a	—N/a
9 May 2016	Nashville	United States	Grand Ole Opry	—N/a	1,994/4,404	$185,890
10 May 2016	St. Louis	United States	Fox Theatre	—N/a	—N/a	—N/a
13 May 2016	Las Vegas	United States	The Joint (Blacked Out in Vegas)	—N/a	11,537/13,278	$1,294,975
14 May 2016	Las Vegas	United States	The Joint (Blacked Out in Vegas)	—N/a	11,537/13,278	$1,294,975
18 May 2016	Las Vegas	United States	The Joint (Blacked Out in Vegas)	—N/a	11,537/13,278	$1,294,975
20 May 2016	Las Vegas	United States	The Joint (Blacked Out in Vegas)	—N/a	11,537/13,278	$1,294,975
21 May 2016	Las Vegas	United States	The Joint (Blacked Out in Vegas)	—N/a	11,537/13,278	$1,294,975
24 May 2016	El Paso	United States	Don Haskins Arena	—N/a	—N/a	—N/a
25 May 2016	Albuquerque	United States	Isleta Amphitheater	—N/a	—N/a	—N/a
28 May 2016	Pryor Creek	United States	Rocklahoma	—N/a	63,993/72,000	$3,200,219
29 May 2016	San Antonio	United States	River City Rockfest	—N/a	—N/a	—N/a
1 June 2016	Monterrey	Mexico	Monterrey Arena	—N/a	—N/a	—N/a
3 June 2016	Mexico City	Mexico	Mexico City Arena	—N/a	—N/a	—N/a
4 June 2016	Guadalajara	Mexico	Telmex Auditorium	—N/a	—N/a	—N/a
Leg 9: Europe
18 June 2016	Hinwil	Switzerland	Rock The Ring	—N/a	—N/a	—N/a
20 June 2016	Tilloloy	France	Château de Tilloloy	—N/a	—N/a	—N/a
23 June 2016	Copenhagen	Denmark	Copenhell Festival	—N/a	—N/a	—N/a
28 June 2016	Lisbon	Portugal	Meo Arena	—N/a	—N/a	—N/a
30 June 2016	Bilbao	Spain	Arena Miribilla	—N/a	—N/a	—N/a
2 July 2016	Cordoba	Spain	Plaza de Toros	—N/a	—N/a	—N/a
3 July 2016	Madrid	Spain	Barclaycard Arena	—N/a	—N/a	—N/a
12 July 2016	Istanbul	Turkey	Küçükçiftlik Park	—N/a	—N/a	—N/a
14 July 2016	Tel Aviv	Israel	Menora Mivtachim Arena	—N/a	—N/a	—N/a
16 July 2016	Bucharest	Romania	Romexpo	—N/a	—N/a	—N/a
17 July 2016	Sofia	Bulgaria	Armeets Arena	—N/a	—N/a	—N/a
20 July 2016	Athens	Greece	Plateia Nerou Faliro	—N/a	—N/a	—N/a
23 July 2016	Regensburg	Germany	Castle Thurn und Taxis	—N/a	—N/a	—N/a
29 July 2016	Kaarina	Finland	Hovirinnan Ranta	—N/a	—N/a	—N/a
30 July 2016	Nilsia	Finland	Tahko Spa Arena	—N/a	—N/a	—N/a
1 August 2016	Carcassonne	France	Festival de Carcassonne	—N/a	—N/a	—N/a
2 August 2016	Monaco		Sporting Summer Festival	—N/a	—N/a	—N/a
Leg 10: Asia
14 August 2016	Beijing	China	Worker's Gymnasium	—N/a	—N/a	—N/a
Leg 11: Europe
20 August 2016	Batumi	Georgia	Black Sea Arena	—N/a	—N/a	—N/a
Leg 12: South America
1 September 2016	São Paulo	Brazil	Credicard Hall	—N/a	16,637/20,022	$1,367,060
3 September 2016	São Paulo	Brazil	Credicard Hall	—N/a	16,637/20,022	$1,367,060
4 September 2016	São Paulo	Brazil	Credicard Hall	—N/a	16,637/20,022	$1,367,060
8 September 2016	Fortaleza	Brazil	Arena Do CFO	—N/a	10,995/12,726	$753,313
11 September 2016	Rio de Janeiro	Brazil	Metropolitan	—N/a	5,871/8,384	$519,671
13 September 2016	Santiago	Chile	Moviestar Arena	—N/a	10,940/14,974	$646,718
15 September 2016	Buenos Aires	Argentina	Microestadio Cubierto Malvinas Argentinas	—N/a	—N/a	—N/a
18 September 2016	Asunción	Paraguay	Jockey Club	—N/a	—N/a	—N/a
Leg 13: Asia
3 October 2016	Taipei	Taiwan	Nangang Exhibition Hall	—N/a	—N/a	—N/a
6 October 2016	Tokyo	Japan	Zepp Divercity	—N/a	—N/a	—N/a
8 October 2016	Saitama	Japan	Saitama Super Arena (Loud Park Festival)	—N/a	—N/a	—N/a
11 October 2016	Osaka	Japan	Grand Cube	—N/a	—N/a	—N/a
Leg 14: Oceania
15 October 2016	Nouméa	New Caledonia	Hippodrome Henri Milliard	—N/a	—N/a	—N/a
18 October 2016	Melbourne	Australia	Palais Theatre	—N/a	2,896 / 2,896	—N/a
Leg 15: Asia
21 October 2016	Singapore		Suntec Convention and Exhibition Centre	—N/a	—N/a	—N/a
23 October 2016	Hanoi	Vietnam	Monsoon Music Festival – The Citadel of Thăng Long	—N/a	—N/a	—N/a
29 October 2016	Selangor	Malaysia	Sepang International Circuit	—N/a	—N/a	—N/a
Leg 16: Europe
20 November 2016	Dijon	France	Zenith	—N/a	—N/a	—N/a
23 November 2016	Cologne	Germany	Lanxesse Arena	—N/a	—N/a	—N/a
25 November 2016	Leipzig	Germany	Arena Leipzig	—N/a	—N/a	—N/a
27 November 2016	Frankfurt	Germany	Festhalle	—N/a	—N/a	—N/a
29 November 2016	Hamburg	Germany	Barclaycard-Arena	—N/a	6,444/9,905	$418,765
2 December 2016	Berlin	Germany	Mercedes Benz Arena	—N/a	—N/a	—N/a
