= The Zoo (song) =

Single by Scorpions

from the album Animal Magnetism
- Released: 1 March 1980
- Recorded: December 1979 – February 1980
- Genre: Heavy metal
- Length: 5:28
- Label: Harvest/EMI (Europe); Mercury (US)
- Composer: Rudolf Schenker
- Lyricist: Klaus Meine
- Producer: Dieter Dierks

Scorpions singles chronology
"Lovedrive" (1979)	"The Zoo" (1980)	"Lady Starlight" (1980)

"The Zoo" is a song by the German hard rock band Scorpions, from their album Animal Magnetism. Written by group members Rudolf Schenker (guitar) and Klaus Meine (vocals), it features a talk box performed by lead guitarist Matthias Jabs.

== Background ==
Schenker wrote much of the music during the band's first tour of the United States in 1979. When Meine heard Schenker's riff, it reminded him of the band's earlier visit to a street in New York City, laconically referred to as a "zoo". Meine's lyrics duly contain references to city streets, especially New York's 42nd Street.

The song has been featured on Scorpions "best of" compilations, such as Deadly Sting, Bad for Good: The Very Best of Scorpions and the box set Box of Scorpions. A rerecorded version graces the Comeblack album.

It also appears on the soundtrack of the video game NBA 2K18.

== Reception ==
Released as a single in 1980, the song peaked at #75 in the UK. Even so, it is an acclaimed heavy metal song, with one critic noting that "The Zoo" is both "ominously slow and melodically accessible" with a key element being the "Berlin burlesque vocal melody". On this note, it is used by many strippers in their stage act.

"This song was permission to be a metal guy and to have songs with melody," noted Megadeth front man Dave Mustaine. "'The Zoo' doesn't have a giant riff, but it's got a really hooky melody. I thought, 'You know what? This legitimises everything I wanna do…' 'The Zoo' opened the door for us to write heavy songs with melody."

== Personnel ==
Personnel as per the Animal Magnetism liner notes.

- Klaus Meine – vocals
- Matthias Jabs – lead guitar, talk box
- Rudolf Schenker – rhythm guitar
- Francis Buchholz – bass
- Herman Rarebell – drums
