= You and I (Scorpions song) =

1996 single by Scorpions

Single by Scorpions

from the album Pure Instinct
- Released: 29 March 1996
- Genre: Hard rock, soft rock
- Length: 4:21 (Special single mix); 6:13 (Album version)
- Label: EastWest
- Songwriter(s): Klaus Meine
- Producer(s): Erwin Musper; Scorpions

Scorpions singles chronology
"In Trance" (1995)	"You and I" (1996)	"Wild Child" (1996)

"You and I" is a song by German rock band Scorpions from their thirteenth studio album Pure Instinct. It was released as the first single from the album, and was a top 40 hit in at least five countries, including their native Germany where it peaked at No. 22. A "Butcher" radio remix of this song was included as a Japan-only bonus track on the band's 1999 album Eye II Eye.

== Music video ==
The music video was directed by Marcus Nispel. It premiered in May 1996 and was filmed in Manhattan.

== Charts ==
Chart (1996)	Peak Position
Austria (Ö3 Austria Top 40)	34
France (SNEP)	23
Germany (GfK)	22
Switzerland (Schweizer Hitparade)	23
Sweden (Sverigetopplistan)	37
