= Paweł Mąciwoda =

Polish bassist (born 1967)

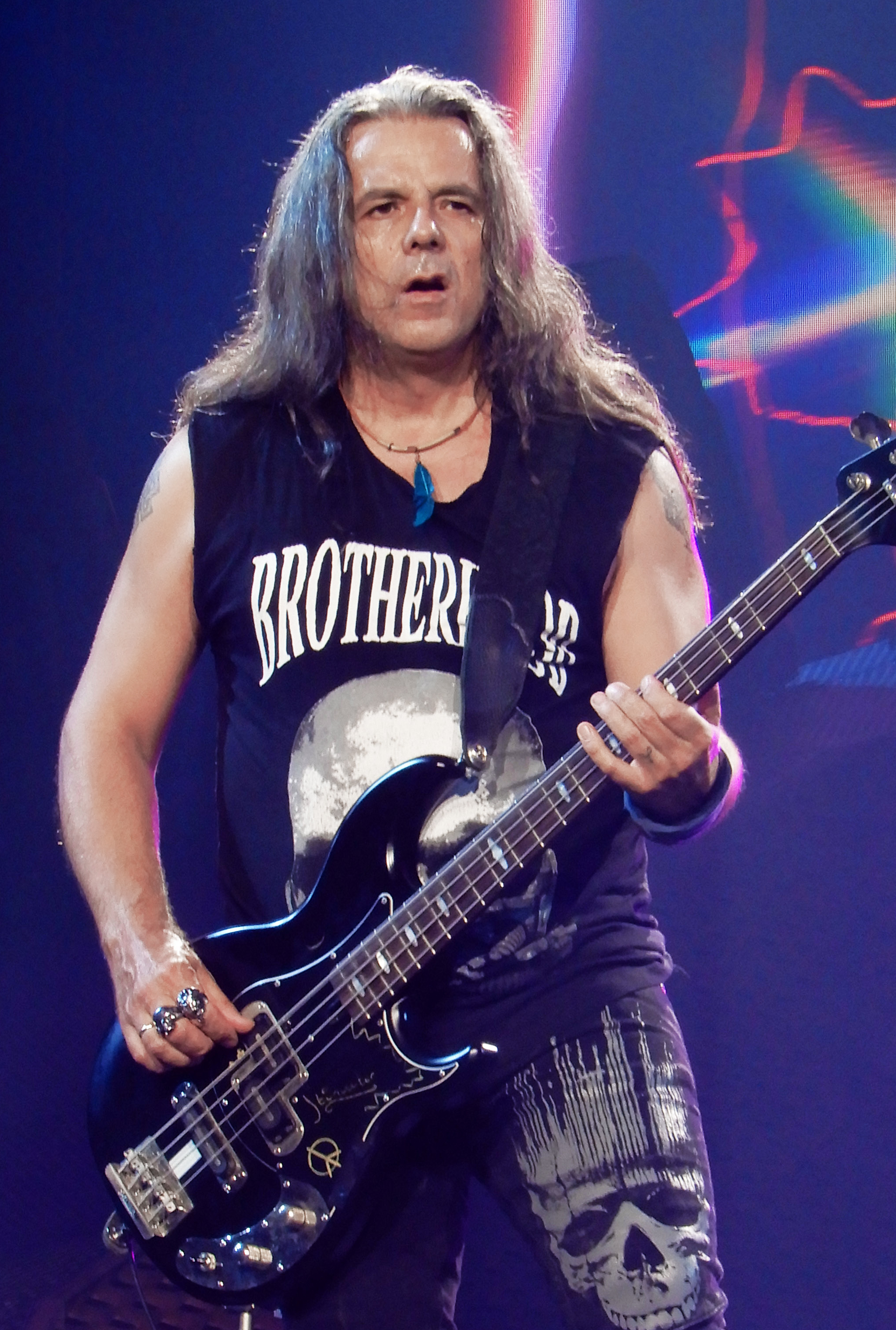
- Mąciwoda in 2022

Background information
- Born: 20 February 1967 (age 59); Wieliczka, Poland
- Genres: Hard rock; heavy metal; thrash metal; blues; funk rock; jazz fusion
- Occupation: Musician
- Instruments: Bass
- Member of: Scorpions; Stirwater; TSA
- Formerly of: Little Egoists; Dupa; Püdelsi; Walk Away; Funk de Nite; Oddział Zamknięty; LAPd; Virgin Snatch

Paweł Mąciwoda (Polish pronunciation: [ˈpavɛw mɔɲt͡ɕiˈvɔda]; born 20 February 1967) is a Polish bassist who began playing with the German hard rock band Scorpions in 2003 and became an official member in January 2004. He is the band's longest-tenured bassist, having since surpassed the nineteen-year tenure of bassist Francis Buchholz.

== Early career ==
Born in Wieliczka, Mąciwoda began playing bass guitar semi-professionally at the age of 15 with his father's encouragement. His young age on the rock and roll circuit earned him the nickname "Baby", but within a few years Mąciwoda was touring Europe with a jazz fusion band called the Little Egoists, and for overlapping periods of time performed as a member of the avant-garde rock bands Düpą and Püdelsi, both based in Kraków. At about the same time he also released a solo album entitled Radio Wieliczka. His other band credits during his early years included the popular jazz-rock band Walk Away, headed by the world-famous violinist Michał Urbaniak and lead vocalist Urszula Dudziak, with whom he recorded the album Magic Lady.

== Current projects ==
In 2009, he appeared on the WU-HAE's Opera Nowohucka album alongside such artists as Grzegorz Markowski, Maciej Maleńczuk and Olaf Deriglasoff.

As of 2011, Mąciwoda has been collaborating with friend and fellow musician Efrem Wilder in the outfit Stirwater. The name Stirwater is derived from the English translation of Mąciwoda's last name. The collaboration between musicians ended after a couple of years but they managed to get a single recorded. It was called "Water Water" and it was number two for a couple of weeks on the Polish radio station Trójka in the summer of 2012. After that the band broke up, but the project Stirwater has continued, as he is playing and recording with fellow musicians from all over the world like Florian Hofer from Germany, and Atma Anur from the UK.

== See also ==
- List of Poles
- Music of Poland
