= Scorpions (band) =

German rock band

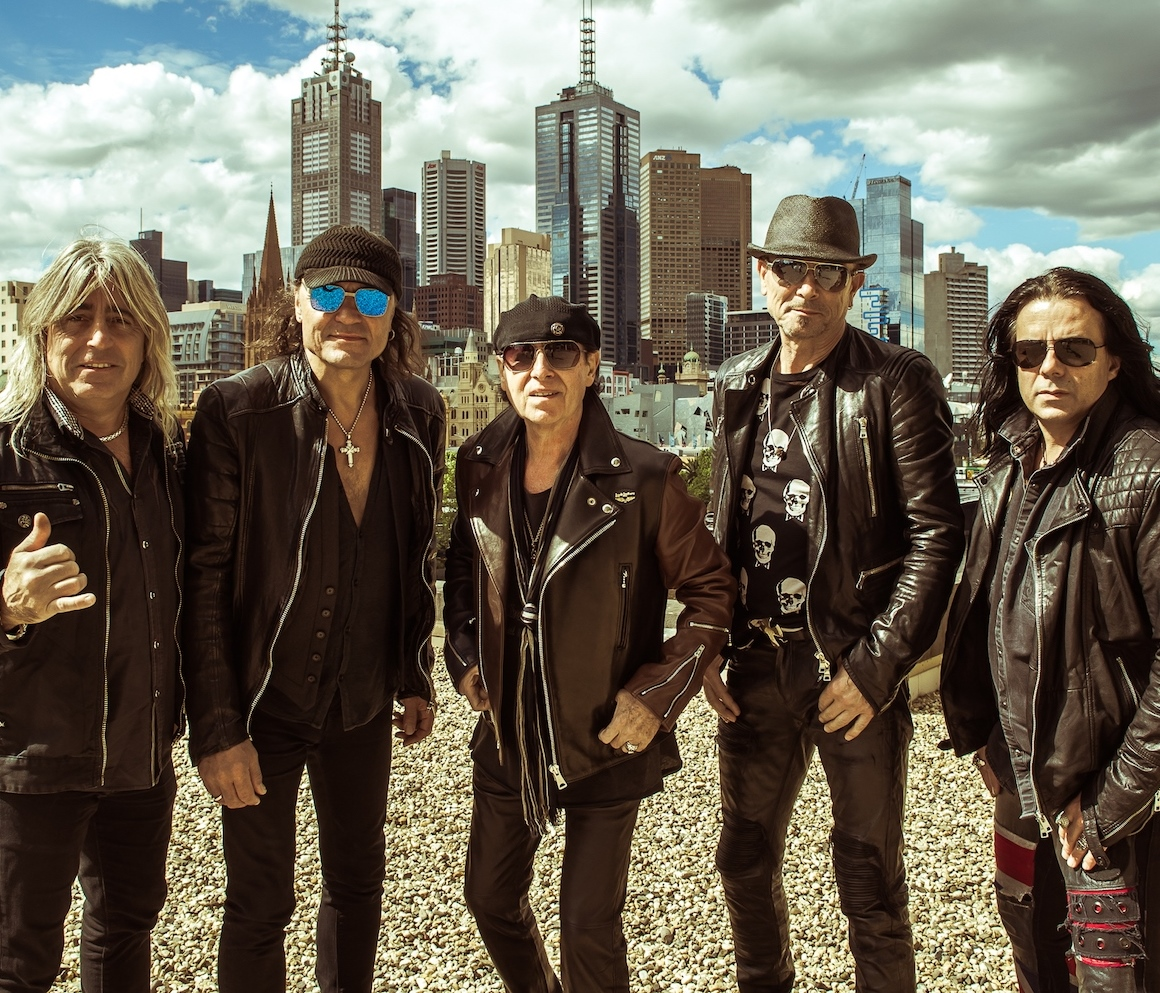
- The Scorpions in Melbourne, Australia, in 2016 during the 50th Anniversary World Tour: (from left) Mikkey Dee, Matthias Jabs, Klaus Meine, Rudolf Schenker and Paweł Mąciwoda.

Background information
- Also known as: The Nameless (1965); The Hunters (1975)
- Origin: Hanover, West Germany
- Genres: Hard rock; heavy metal; glam metal (1980s); krautrock (early)
- Works: Discography
- Years active: 1965–present
- Labels: RCA; Ariola; East West; Harvest/EMI; Vertigo; Mercury; EMI Classics; Sony
- Spinoffs: Michael Schenker Group; Electric Sun; Dawn Road
- Members: Rudolf Schenker; Klaus Meine; Matthias Jabs; Paweł Mąciwoda; Mikkey Dee
- Past members: Wolfgang Dziony; Lothar Heimberg; Michael Schenker; Francis Buchholz; Uli Jon Roth; Jürgen Rosenthal; Rudy Lenners; Herman Rarebell; Ralph Rieckermann; James Kottak; See List for others
- Website: the-scorpions.com

The Scorpions are a German hard rock/heavy metal band formed in Hanover in 1965 by guitarist Rudolf Schenker. The longest-running and most successful line-up of the band included Schenker, Klaus Meine (vocals), Matthias Jabs (lead guitar), Francis Buchholz (bass), and Herman Rarebell (drums), and lasted from 1978 to 1992. The Scorpions' only remaining original member has been Schenker, although Meine has been with the band continuously since 1969, while Jabs has been a consistent member since 1978 and bassist Paweł Mąciwoda and drummer Mikkey Dee have been members since 2003 and 2016, respectively.

The band's debut album, Lonesome Crow (1972), featured Schenker's younger brother Michael on lead guitar, before he departed to join UFO. He was replaced by Uli Jon Roth, who played with the band on their next four studio albums, Fly to the Rainbow (1974), In Trance (1975), Virgin Killer (1976) and Taken by Force (1977), and their first live album Tokyo Tapes (1978). Following Roth's departure, the band recruited Matthias Jabs and began moving towards a more melodic rock style on their sixth studio album Lovedrive (1979), which also saw the Scorpions reunite briefly with Michael Schenker before he left again to begin a solo career. Over the next decade, the band achieved influence, approval from music critics, and significant commercial success with the albums Animal Magnetism (1980), Blackout (1982), Love at First Sting (1984), the live album World Wide Live (1985), Savage Amusement (1988), the compilation album Best of Rockers 'n' Ballads (1989) and Crazy World (1990), all of which are certified at least platinum in the United States. The band has released thirteen consecutive studio albums that were in the top 10 in Germany, one of which reached No. 1, as well as three consecutive albums that were in the top 10 in the Billboard 200 in the United States. Their latest studio album, Rock Believer, was released in February 2022.

The Scorpions are estimated to have sold over 100 million records worldwide, making them one of the best-selling hard rock and heavy metal bands of all time. One of their most recognized hits is "Wind of Change" (from Crazy World), a symbolic anthem of the political changes in Eastern Europe in the late 1980s and early 1990s and the fall of the Berlin Wall, and it remains as one of the best-selling singles in the world with over 14 million copies. Two songs from their ninth studio album Love at First Sting, "Rock You Like a Hurricane" and "Still Loving You", are regarded as some of the most influential and popular works, both in heavy metal music and among rock ballads, defined as "rock anthem" and "a true hymn of love", respectively.

They became the first heavy metal band from a non-English-speaking country to achieve international success.

== History ==
=== Formation and early history (1965–1973) ===
Rudolf Schenker, the band's rhythm/lead guitarist, founded the band Scorpions together with three school friends, Wolfgang Dziony (drums) Karl-Heinz Vollmer (lead and rhythm guitar), and Achim Kirchoff (bass) in January 1965 as "the Nameless" before choosing "the Scorpions" as their moniker on December 26, 1965. Initially the band had Merseybeat influences and Schenker and Dziony who handled the vocals were influenced by the Everly Brothers.

Between 1966 and 1967 they gave several concerts in the north of what was then West Germany, performing versions of the Beatles, the Ventures, the Shadows, the Everly Brothers and the Rolling Stones, among other groups of the British Invasion. On occasion, they also opened for the Searchers, the Easybeats, the Lords and Dave Dee. In September 1966, they performed at the legendary Star-Club in Hamburg.

In 1967, they recruited 15-year-old Werner Hoyer as vocalist. Later that November, Karl Heinz Vollmer left the band due to his military obligations; military service prevented him from appearing at concerts and he was replaced by Ulrich Worobiec. Not long after, Werner Hoyer departed from the band to finish school and was replaced by Bernd Hegner while Rudolf finally finished school.

In 1968, Achim Kirchoff left and was replaced by Lothar Heimberg.

In 1969, Hegner and Worobiec also departed the band because they both wanted to finish school. Klaus Meine then joined as the new vocalist and apart from that, he invited Schenker's younger brother Michael to join the band as the new lead guitarist. Klaus and Michael had played together in the Led Zeppelin and Taste cover band Copernicus. With this line-up they won a music contest in 1972 and recorded two songs for a single that was never released on the CCA label, but the songs, "Action" and "I'm Going Mad" were later released on different compilation albums including Psychedelic Gems 2.

In 1972, the group recorded and released their debut album, Lonesome Crow, with Lothar Heimberg on bass and Wolfgang Dziony on drums and re-recorded their CCA songs. During the Lonesome Crow tour the Scorpions opened for up-and-coming British band UFO. In October 1972, drummer Dziony left and an Israeli born American drummer who was visiting Germany, Joe Wyman, answered their ad requesting a new drummer. But since the band was barely making any money at the time, Wyman quit in December 1972. Dziony then came back to complete their tour. But for their January 1973 appearances with Rory Gallagher, they had Helmut Eisenhut on drums.

Near the end of the tour for Lonesome Crow, guitarist Michael Schenker had accepted an offer to play lead guitar for UFO, which he joined in June of 1973. Uli Roth, who had been suggested by Michael, helped the band finish their tour. But when Eisenhut died and Heimberg left in the summer of 1973, they briefly played with a rhythm section of Ewi (bass) and Hal Fingerhood (drums).

The departure of Michael Schenker eventually led to the breakup of the band. In 1973, Roth, who had helped the Scorpions complete the Lonesome Crow tour, was offered the role of lead guitarist, but turned them down, preferring instead to remain in the band Dawn Road. Rudolf Schenker eventually decided he wanted to work with Roth, but did not want to resurrect the last Scorpions line-up. He attended some of Dawn Road's rehearsals and ultimately decided to join the band, which consisted of Roth, Francis Buchholz (bass), Achim Kirschning (keyboards) and Jürgen Rosenthal (drums). Uli Roth and Buchholz persuaded Rudolf Schenker to invite Klaus Meine to join on vocals, which he soon did. While there were more members of Dawn Road than Scorpions in the band, they decided to use the Scorpions name because it was well known on the German hard rock scene and an album had been released under that name.

=== Rise to fame (1974–1978) ===
In 1974, the new line-up released Fly to the Rainbow. The album proved to be more successful than Lonesome Crow and songs such as "Speedy's Coming" and the title track established the band's sound. Achim Kirschning decided to leave after the recordings. Soon after, Jürgen Rosenthal had to leave as well since he was drafted into the army (he later joined German progressive rock band Eloy, recording three albums). Rosenthal was replaced in July 1974 by Jürgen Fechter, but then in 1975 Rudy Lenners from Belgium became the band's next drummer.

That year, the band released In Trance, which marked the beginning of their long collaboration with German producer Dieter Dierks. The album was a huge step forward for the Scorpions and established their heavy metal formula. It garnered a fan base at home and abroad with cuts such as "In Trance", "Dark Lady" and "Robot Man".

Meanwhile, as "the Hunters", the band recorded "Fuchs geh' voran" and "Wenn es richtig losgeht", German language cover versions of "Action" and "Fox on the Run" by the Sweet for EMI's Electrola label.

In 1976, the Scorpions released Virgin Killer, the album cover of which featured a nude prepubescent girl behind a broken pane of glass. The cover art was designed by Stefan Bohle, who was the product manager for the West German division of RCA Records, their label at the time. The cover brought the band considerable market exposure as well as controversy and was subsequently pulled or replaced in other countries because of its imagery. The album itself garnered widespread praise for its music from select critics and fan base. In 2008, the cover art on the English Wikipedia was briefly blacklisted by the Internet Watch Foundation, before reversing their decision 4 days later.

The following year, Rudy Lenners resigned for personal reasons and was replaced by Herman Rarebell, an experienced musician who had recorded with the bands Missus Beastly and Onyx.

For the follow-up Taken by Force, RCA Records made a determined effort to promote the album in stores and on the radio. The album's single, "Steamrock Fever", was added to some of RCA's radio promotional records. Roth was not happy with the commercial direction the band was taking. Although he performed on the band's Japan tour, he departed to form his own band, Electric Sun prior to the release of the resultant double live album Tokyo Tapes. Tokyo Tapes was released in the US and Europe six months after its Japanese release. By that time in mid-1978, after auditioning around 140 guitarists, the Scorpions recruited Matthias Jabs, a veteran of the German rock scene who had played in the bands Lady and Fargo.

=== Commercial success (1978–1992) ===
Following the addition of Jabs, the Scorpions left RCA for Mercury Records in the United States and EMI Records worldwide to record their next album Lovedrive (1979).

Just weeks after quitting UFO, Michael Schenker returned to the group for a short period during the recordings for the album. This gave the band three guitarists. Lovedrive was an album that some critics consider to be the pinnacle of their career. Containing such fan favourites as "Loving You Sunday Morning", "Always Somewhere", "Holiday" and the instrumental "Coast to Coast", it firmly cemented the "Scorpions formula" of hard rock songs mixed with melodic ballads. Although it had been widely believed for decades that Michael Schenker's contribution to the record was only limited to three songs, he vehemently maintained he appeared on the whole album during an interview with satellite radio host Eddie Trunk. The album's provocative artwork was named "Best album sleeve of 1979" by Playboy magazine, yet ultimately changed for American release. Lovedrive reached No. 55 on the US charts, demonstrating that the band was gathering an international following. After the completion and release of the album the band decided to retain Michael in the band, forcing Jabs to leave. However, in April 1979, during their tour in France, Michael quit again and Jabs was brought in permanently to replace him.

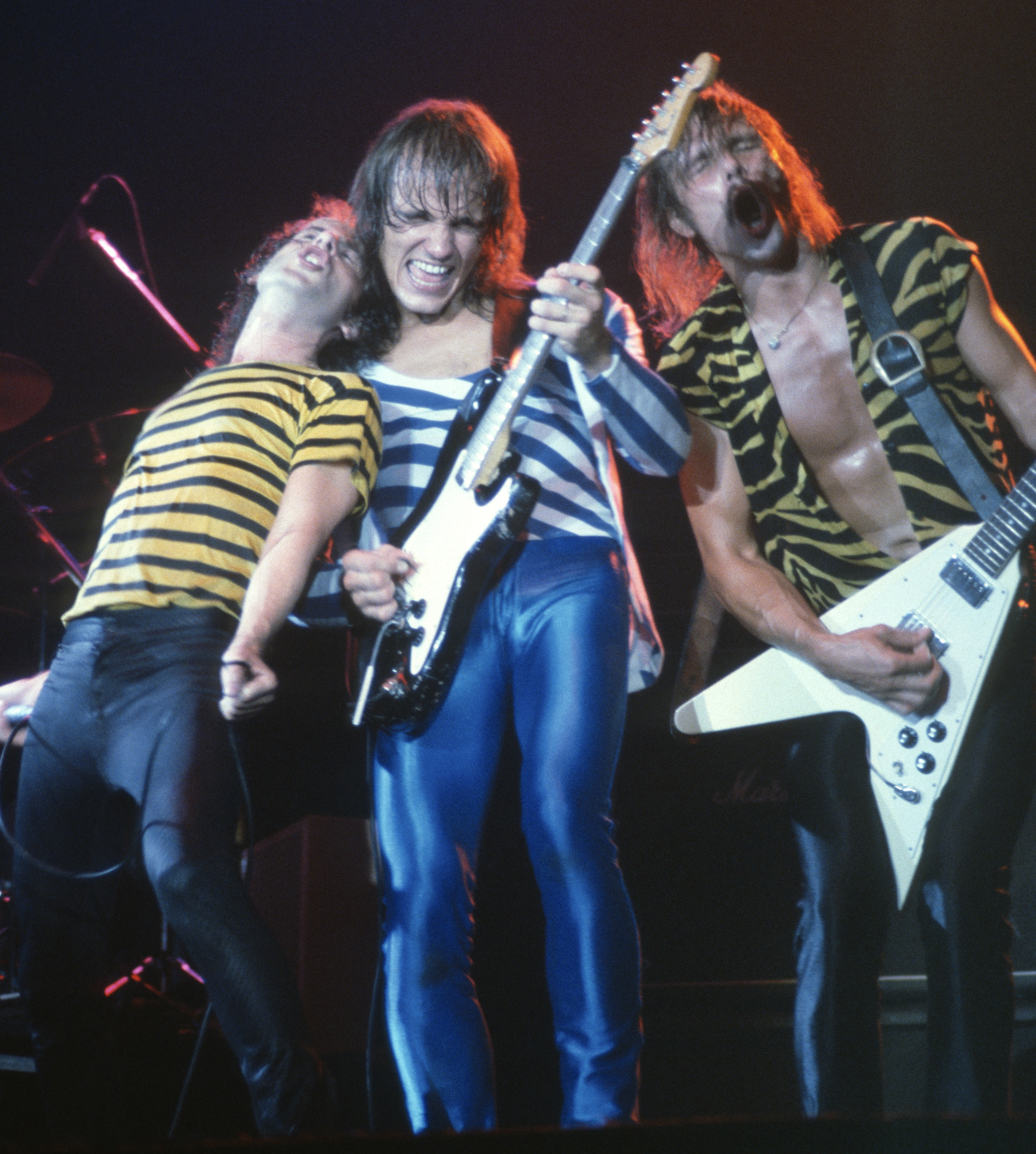
Klaus Meine, Matthias Jabs and Rudolf Schenker at the Aragon Ballroom, Chicago, 1980

In 1980, the band released Animal Magnetism, again with a provocative cover this time showing a girl kneeling and a Doberman Pinscher sitting in front of a man. Animal Magnetism contained classics such as "The Zoo" and "Make It Real". Soon after the album's release, Meine began experiencing throat problems. He required surgery on his vocal cords and doubts were raised about whether he would ever sing again.

Meanwhile, the band began working on their next album, Blackout in 1981. A then-unknown Don Dokken was brought in to provide guide and backing vocals, while Meine recovered. Meine's voice eventually healed completely and he was able to finish recording the album. Blackout was released in 1982 and quickly became the band's best selling album to date, eventually going platinum. Meine's voice showed no signs of weakness and reviews for the album were positive. Blackout spawned two singles: "No One Like You" and "Can't Live Without You".

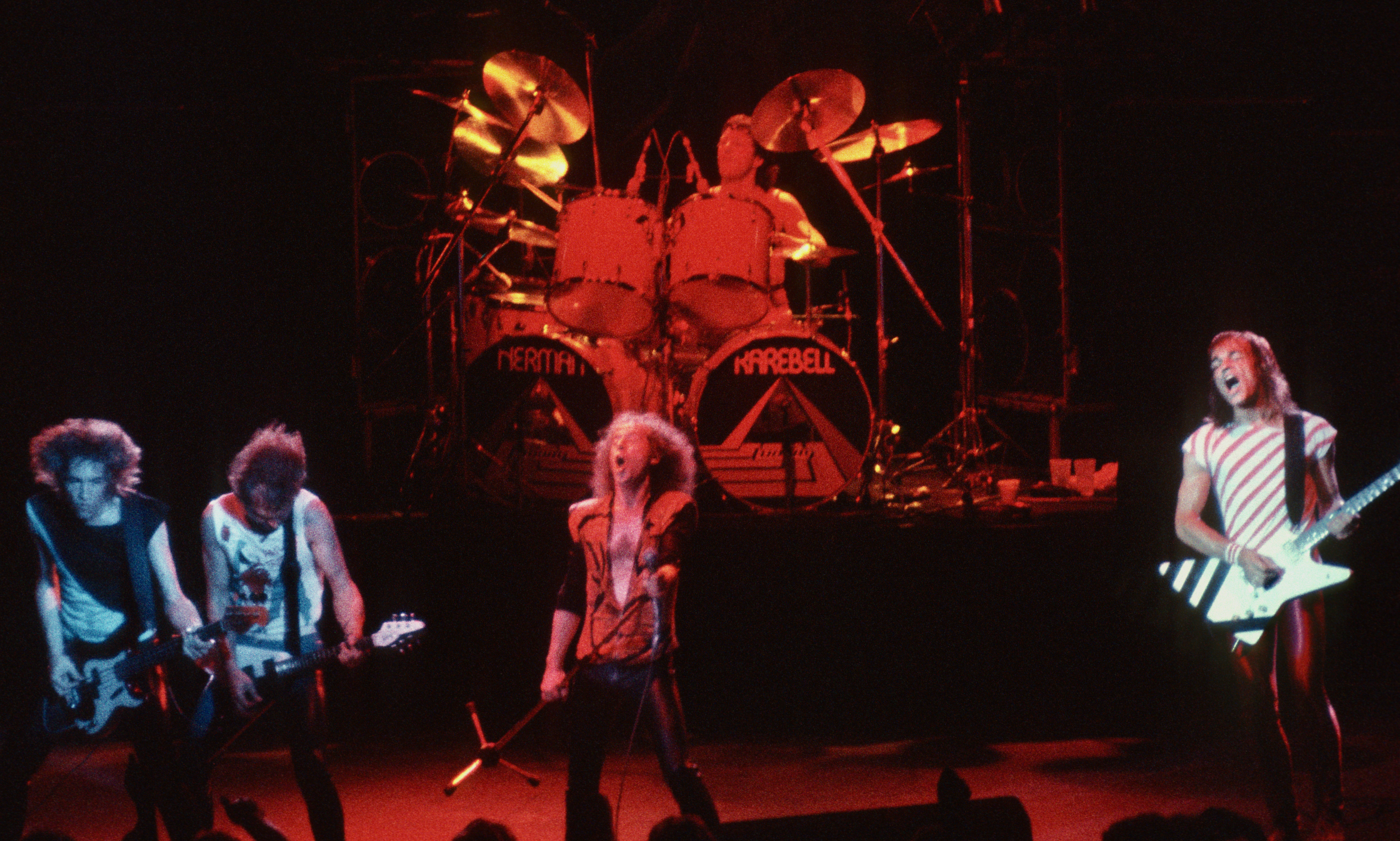
Scorpions performing at Alpine Valley Music Theatre, Wisconsin, 1982

Gaining in popularity from the success of Blackout, the Scorpions performed to over 375,000 fans on Day 2 at the three-day US Festival concert held in San Bernardino, California during Memorial Day Weekend of 1983. The concert was aired live on MTV, giving the band wide exposure in a live show.

The 1984 album Love at First Sting cemented the Scorpions' status as an internationally popular band. Propelled by the single "Rock You Like a Hurricane", Love at First Sting climbed the charts and went double platinum in the USA a few months after its release.

MTV gave the album's videos "Rock You Like a Hurricane", "I'm Leaving You", "Big City Nights", and the power ballad "Still Loving You" significant airplay, greatly contributing to the album's success. The channel even supplied the Scorpions with the nickname "the Ambassadors of Rock", to the chagrin of industry insiders who recognized the executive influence behind the scenes. Rolling Stone magazine named them "the Heroes of Heavy Metal".

The band toured extensively behind Love at First Sting and released their second live album, World Wide Live in 1985. Recorded over a year-long world tour and released at the height of their popularity, the album was another success for the band, peaking at No. 14 in the charts in the US and at No. 18 in the UK.

After their extensive world tours, the band finally returned to the studio, to record Savage Amusement. Released in 1988, four years after their previous studio album, Savage Amusement represented a more polished and mature sound similar to the style Def Leppard had found success with. The album sold well but was considered somewhat of a critical disappointment. However, British rock and metal magazine Kerrang! did award the album five K's out of five.

On the Savage Amusement tour in 1988, the Scorpions became only the second Western group (not American) to play in the Soviet Union. Uriah Heep had performed in the country earlier in December 1987, in Leningrad. The following year the band returned to perform at the Moscow Music Peace Festival. As a result, the Scorpions developed an extended Russian fan base and still return to perform. Also in 1989, the Scorpions released the compilation album Best of Rockers 'n' Ballads, which, in addition to the band's hits from 1979 to 1988, included several rare or previously unreleased tracks: "Hey You", from the Lovedrive sessions; a remixed version of "Is There Anybody There?"; and a cover of the Who's "I Can't Explain", which was also included on that same year's Stairway to Heaven/Highway to Hell charity compilation album. This is the band's only compilation album, to be certified platinum in the United States.

Wishing to distance themselves from the Savage Amusement style, the band parted ways with their long-time producer and "Sixth Scorpion", Dieter Dierks, replacing him with Keith Olsen when they returned to the studio in 1990. Crazy World was released that year and displayed a less polished sound. The album was propelled in large part by the massive success of the ballad "Wind of Change". The song muses on the socio-political changes that were occurring in Eastern Europe and other parts of the world at the end of the Cold War. Crazy World remains the band's last album to receive gold or platinum certification in the United States. On 21 July 1990, they joined many other guests for Roger Waters's massive performance of The Wall in Berlin. The Scorpions performed both versions of "In the Flesh" from The Wall.

After the Crazy World tour, in 1992, the anthology album Still Loving You was released that summer, containing a collection of ballads, plus the previously unreleased Living for Tomorrow, and the band's long-serving bassist Francis Buchholz left the group. Buchholz's departure would mark the end of the band's peak era, with the Las Vegas Sun stating in 1994 that "In the Garden of Eden time is running out. The party is over."

=== Later years (1993–2009) ===
In 1993, the Scorpions released Face the Heat. Bass was handled by Ralph Rieckermann. For the recording process, the band brought in producer Bruce Fairbairn. The album's sound was more metal than melodic. Neither the heavy metal single "Alien Nation" nor the ballad "Under the Same Sun" came close to matching the success of "Wind of Change". Face the Heat was a moderate success. In 1995, a new album, Live Bites, was produced. The disc documented retro live performances from their Savage Amusement Tour in 1988, all the way through the Face the Heat Tour in 1994. While the album had a technologically cleaner sound in comparison to their best-selling live album, World Wide Live, it was not as successful.

Prior to recording their 13th studio album, 1996's Pure Instinct, drummer Herman Rarebell left the band to set up a recording label. Curt Cress took charge of the drumsticks for the album before Louisville, Kentucky-born James Kottak took over permanently. The album had many ballads. Still, the album's singles "Wild Child" and the soothing ballad "You and I" both enjoyed moderate success.

1999 saw the release of Eye II Eye and a significant change in the band's style, mixing in elements of pop and techno. While the album was slickly produced, it was not received well by fans. The video to the album's first European single, "To Be No. 1", featured a Monica Lewinsky look-alike which did little to improve its popularity.

The following year, the Scorpions had an artistic collaboration with the Berlin Philharmonic that resulted in a 10-song album named Moment of Glory. The album went a long way toward rebuilding the band's reputation after the harsh criticism of Eye II Eye. However, critics accused them of following on the coattails of Metallica's similar collaboration (S&M) with the San Francisco Symphony which had been released the previous year, even though the orchestra had first approached the Scorpions with the idea in 1995.

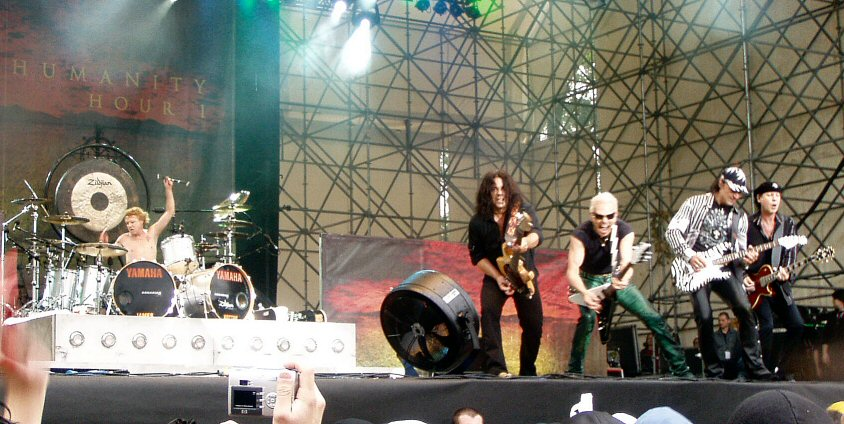
The Scorpions at Gods of Metal in 2007

In 2001, the Scorpions released Acoustica, a live unplugged album featuring acoustic reworkings of the band's biggest hits, plus new tracks. While appreciated by fans, the lack of a new studio album was frustrating to some, and Acoustica did little to return the band to the spotlight.

In 2004, the band released Unbreakable, an album that was hailed by critics as a long-awaited return to form. The album was the heaviest the band had released since Face the Heat. Whether a result of poor promotion by the band's label or the long time between studio releases, Unbreakable received little airplay and did not chart. the Scorpions toured extensively behind the album and played as "Special Guests" with Judas Priest during the 2005 British tour—these were the Scorpions' first dates in the UK since 1999.

In early 2006, the Scorpions released the DVD 1 Night in Vienna that included 14 live tracks and a complete rockumentary. In LA, the band spent about four months in the studio with producers James Michael and Desmond Child working on a concept album titled Humanity: Hour I, which was released in late May 2007, and was followed by the "Humanity World Tour".

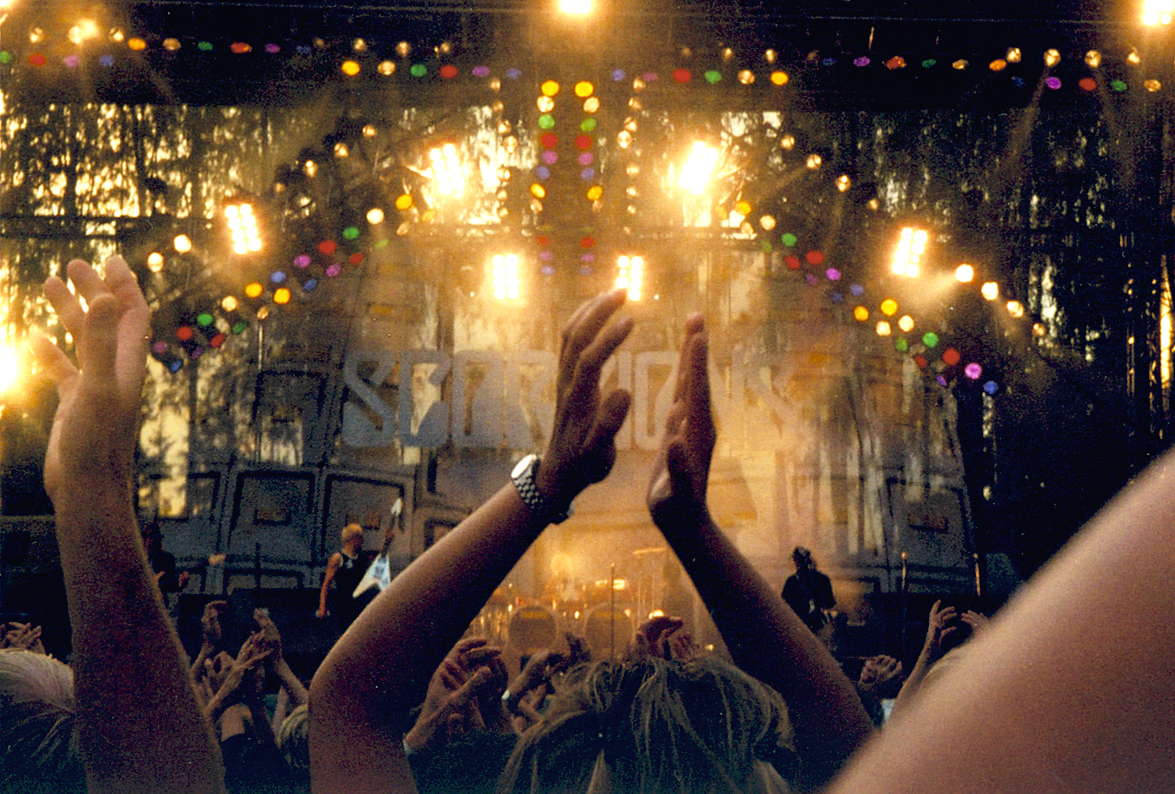
The Scorpions performing at Ankkarock in Vantaa, Finland, in 2007

In 2007, the band collaborated with two of their signature tracks in the video game series, Guitar Hero. "No One Like You" was featured on the Rocks the '80s version of the game while "Rock You Like a Hurricane" was released on Guitar Hero 3: Legends of Rock.

On 14 May 2007, the Scorpions released Humanity – Hour I in Europe. Humanity – Hour I became available in the U.S. on 28 August on New Door Records, entering the Billboard charts at number No. 63.

In a September 2007 podcast interview, Meine said the album was not so much a "concept album", but rather a collection of songs with a common theme. "We didn't want to make another record with songs about boys chasing girls. I mean, come on, give me a break," Meine said.

Asked in 2007 if the band was planning to release a Humanity – Hour II, Meine replied:

That is what everybody is asking. There might be. Who knows? Right now we are at the beginning of the world tour. It is exciting to play the new songs and they go very well with the classics. It is exciting that there is a whole new audience out there. There are many longtime fans but there are a lot of young kids. We just played in London and in Paris and there were young kids rocking out to songs that were written way before they were born. It is amazing. I don't want to think about Hour II right now because Hour I is so exciting. It is very inspiring to see how much the audience enjoys this new music.

On 20 December 2007, the Scorpions played at a concert for the elite of Russia's security forces in the Kremlin. The concert was a celebration of the 90th anniversary of the founding of the Cheka—predecessor of the KGB. The band claimed they thought they were performing a Christmas concert. They said their concert was by no means a tribute to the Cheka, communism, or Russia's brutal past. Members of the audience included Vladimir Putin and Dmitry Medvedev.

On 22 February 2009, the band received Germany's ECHO Honorary Award for lifetime achievement at Berlin's O2 World.

=== Sting in the Tail, Comeblack, and touring (2010–2014) ===
In November 2009, the Scorpions announced their 17th studio album, Sting in the Tail, would be released in early 2010, recorded in Hanover with Swedish producers Mikael "Nord" Andersson and Martin Hansen. It was released on 23 March 2010.

On 24 January 2010, the band announced their initial intentions for Sting in the Tail to be their last album, and the tour supporting it their final tour, although the band later made the decision to continue recording past the end of the tour. Dokken was scheduled to open for them but cancelled after a dispute.

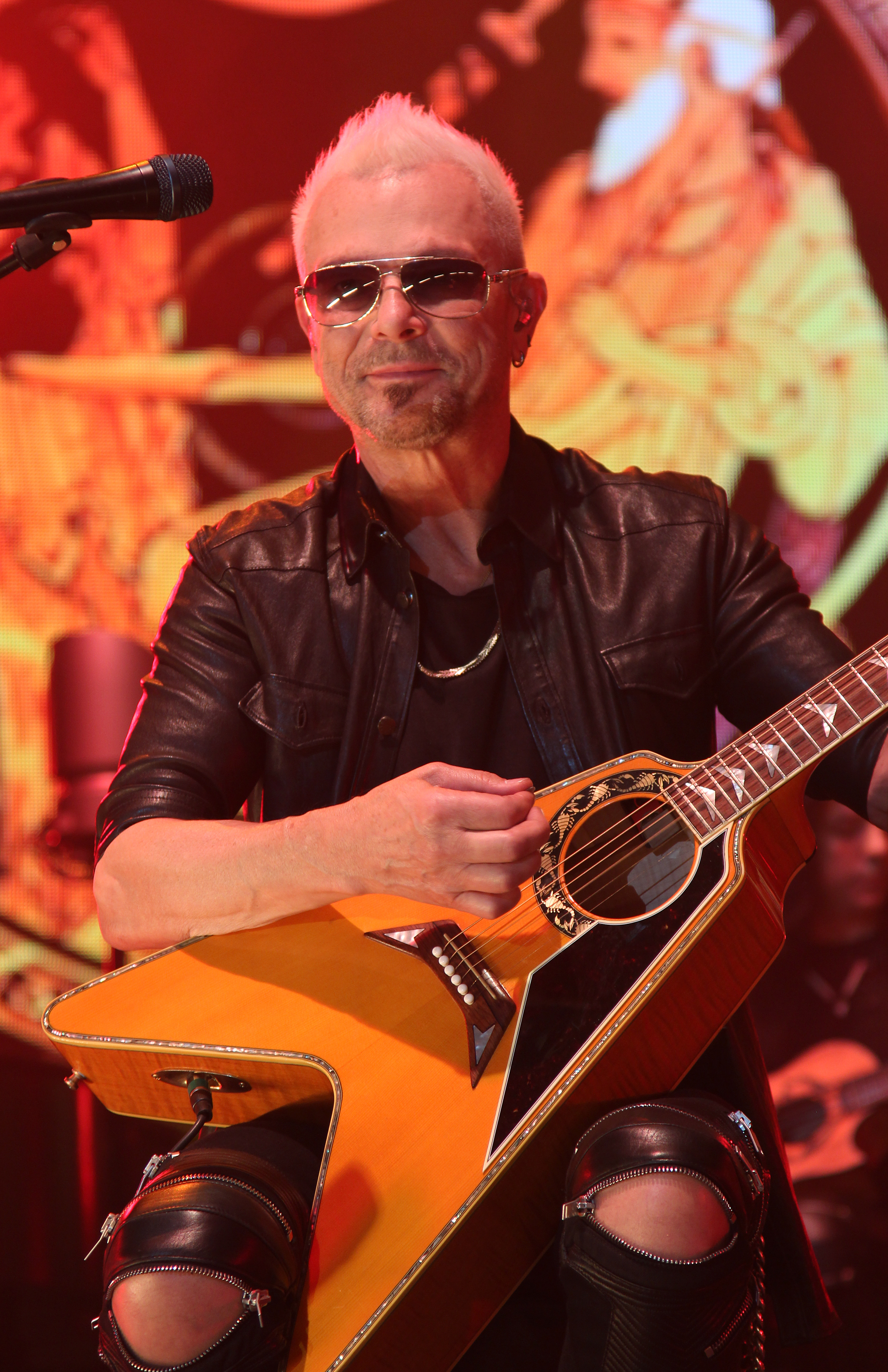
Rudolf Schenker – MTV Unplugged 2014

On 6 April 2010, they were enshrined in Hollywood's Rock Walk in a handprint ceremony, with the band members placing their hands in a long slab of wet cement next to other musical artists.

An album of re-recordings of older songs, Comeblack, was released on 7 November 2011.

July 2011 interview Meine was asked about the future of the Scorpions. He replied, "Our newest project comes out in the next few months. It gives you a chance to experience the Scorpions in 3D. You can actually feel the smoke string out of the guitar like it is a live show. It is an incredible experience. The DVD features our concerts in 3D in Germany. We are just about to do the mix and it should be in the Middle East and Saudi Arabia hopefully soon. Indeed, the strong 3D technology makes us feel like pioneers after all these years [he says, laughing]. We have an album coming out later this year featuring classics. You know our love for them. The '60s was the era for our inspiration. Our movie/documentary also is soon to be released. We have cameras with us on tours, so this documentary is being made during our tours. It also gives you a picture of the Scorpions career and journey."

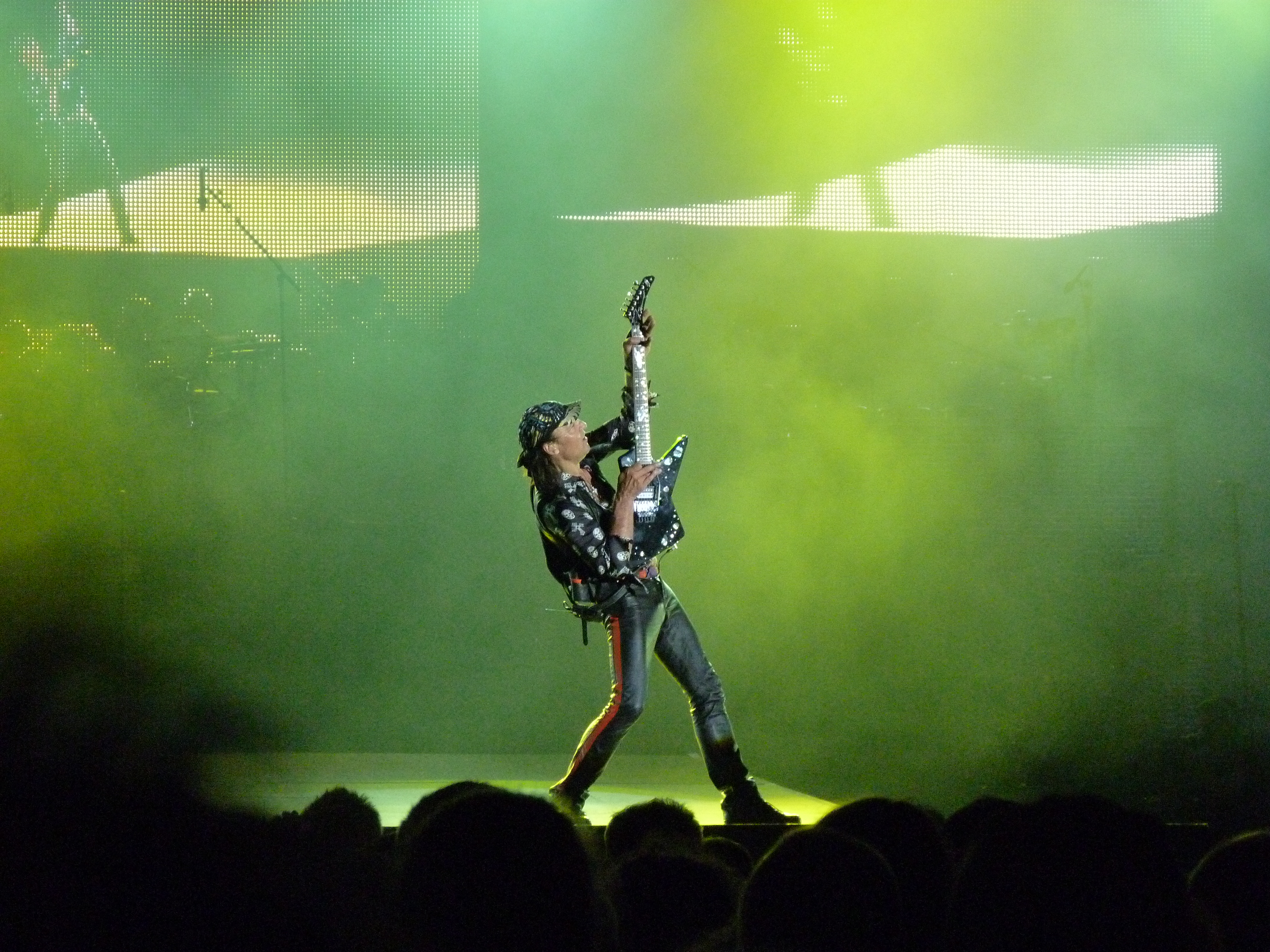
Matthias Jabs in 2014

Despite initial plans for a break up or retirement, guitarist Matthias Jabs told AZ Central on 12 June 2012 that the Scorpions would not split up. A month later, Jabs told Billboard magazine the band had been working on an album that would contain unreleased songs they recorded for the albums Blackout, Love at First Sting, Savage Amusement, and Crazy World and planned to release it in 2014. In April, the Scorpions announced shows in Russia and Belarus with an orchestra in October 2013. On 11, 12, and 14 September 2013, the band played three MTV Unplugged concerts at the Lycabettus-Theatre in Athens. On 6 November 2013, they announced four more MTV Unplugged Concert in Germany 2014. In December 2013, in an interview at Rock Show radio program in Greece, Meine said he was not sure if the album with unreleased songs they recorded for the albums Blackout, Love at First Sting, Savage Amusement and Crazy World would be released in 2014 or later on.

In 2013, the band released the album MTV Unplugged in Athens. The album featured classic songs like Rock You Like a Hurricane and Big City Nights done acoustically, but also included rare live performances of songs like When the Smoke Is Going Down and Where the River Flows.

On 16 August 2014, they announced a new album in the works, due for release sometime in 2015.

In 2014, the Scorpions were nominated for two Echo Awards ("Euro Grammys") for their MTV Unplugged.

=== 50th anniversary and Return to Forever (2015–2017) ===
On 23 October 2014, Meine spoke to the band's French fan-club Crazyscorps, and announced the new record would be published in February or March 2015, to coincide with the band's 50th anniversary. Contrary to what the band said in 2013, the new album presented not only newly recorded versions of never-published songs, but also new material, written between 2011 and 2014. The album was recorded in Sweden, with producers Martin Hansen and Mikael Nord Andersson. Drummer James Kottak, who left the band in May 2014 for rehab, returned to play drums. The new album Return to Forever was released on 20 February 2015.

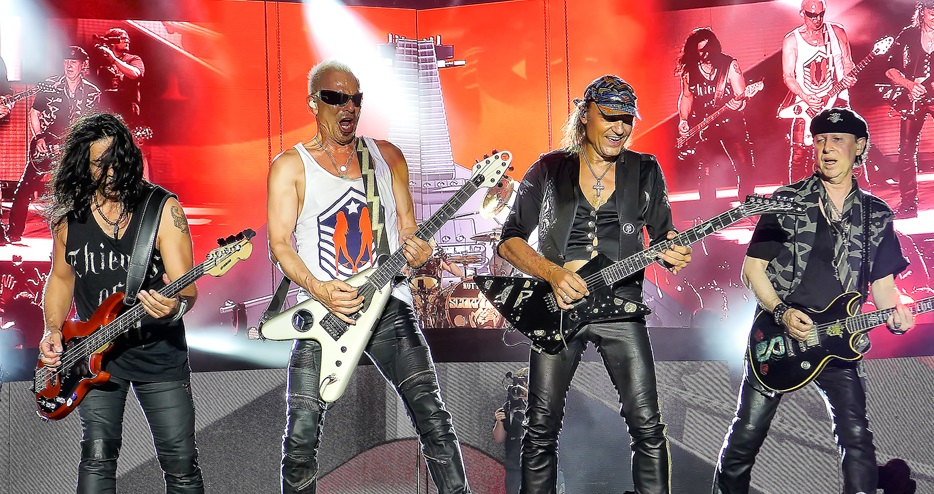
Scorpions performing at RockFest in 2015

On 29 August 2015, the Scorpions announced 50th anniversary deluxe editions of their albums Taken By Force, Tokyo Tapes, Lovedrive, Animal Magnetism, Blackout, Love at First Sting, World Wide Live, and Savage Amusement which were released 6 November 2015. These deluxe releases include "dozens of unreleased songs, alternate versions of big hits, rough mixes, and rare live concert recordings". On 28 April 2016, it was announced that former Motörhead drummer Mikkey Dee would fill in for James Kottak and play drums on 12 North American headlining dates, including a run of shows at the Hard Rock Hotel in Las Vegas dubbed "Scorpions Blacked Out in Las Vegas" with Queensrÿche opening the Vegas shows, and dates in São Paulo. On 12 September 2016, Dee was officially announced as the band's new permanent drummer.

On 18 January 2017, the Scorpions were inducted into the Hall of Heavy Metal History for leading the two-guitar attack in heavy metal. Proceeds from the ceremony benefitted the Ronnie James Dio Stand Up and Shout Cancer Fund.

=== Rock Believer and possible follow-up album (2018–present) ===
In an August 2018 interview with Digital Journal, Scorpions guitarist Rudolf Schenker stated that the band was open to the idea of recording a follow-up to Return to Forever. He explained: "We are still waiting for a moment for inspiration to do another album, like Judas Priest and Metallica did. You have to wait until the time is right." Klaus Meine hinted in May 2019 that "there might be a new album out in 2020."

On 28 April 2020, the Scorpions released (on their YouTube channel) a new (2-minute 16-second short) song entitled "Sign of Hope", inspired by the COVID-19 pandemic.

On 25 July 2020, the Scorpions entered Peppermint Park Studios in Hanover to resume working on their nineteenth studio album. The album's initial sessions, which were supposed to take place in Los Angeles, were done remotely, with producer Greg Fidelman participating via Zoom; however, drummer Mikkey Dee confirmed in a March 2021 interview with Robb Flynn of Machine Head that the band had to abandon their plans to work with Fidelman, due to the COVID-19 pandemic. Progress on the album had continued to be slow by August 2021, when the Scorpions posted a video on Facebook from the studio where they rehearsed a new song (possibly titled "Seventh Sun") for an upcoming tour.

On 29 September 2021, the Scorpions announced Rock Believer as the title of their nineteenth studio album and set 11 February 2022 as its release date; the band later pushed back the release of the album to two weeks after its initially planned release date. They supported the album with a European tour with Mammoth WVH and a North American tour with Thundermother and Whitesnake, as part of the latter's farewell tour.

During the COVID-19 pandemic, they collaborated with Japanese rock star Yoshiki to perform "Wind of Change" for the documentary film Yoshiki: Under the Sky. This was the first time the band came together to perform the Ukraine version of the song. The performance was later released as a music video on YouTube.

In December 2023, it was also announced that the band would return to Turkey for the first time in eight years to perform a live show in Istanbul in May 2024. On October 24, 2024, the band gave a press conference in Hanover at which a concert on July 5, 2025 at the Heinz-von-Heiden-Arena was announced for the 60th anniversary under the motto "Coming Home to Hannover Scorpions and Friends". Rosy Vista, Bülent Ceylan, Alice Cooper and Judas Priest appeared as special guests.

In February 2025, when asked if the Scorpions were planning to make a 20th studio album, Meine stated that "there are a million good reasons to go back into the studio sometime soon. But, on the other side, these days, it's not the time anymore really to make albums." He did not rule out recording a "few songs", and added that the band will discuss working on new music "before [they] make plans for what might come up" in 2026.

On 5 December 2025, the Scorpions released Coming Home Live, their 7th live album on Spinefarm Records, Vertigo Records and BMG Entertainment.

Former Scorpions bassist Francis Buchholz died in January 2026.

== Musical style ==
The Scorpions are described as primarily a hard rock and heavy metal band, as well as krautrock on their early works and glam metal in the 1980s. Later releases also incorporated elements of techno and pop music.

== Legacy ==
The Scorpions are one of the best-selling bands in the history of music, according to various sources, the band's sales are about 100 million worldwide, of which 10.5 million are certified in the United States. All their editions with issued sales certificates have repeatedly reached gold and platinum status in various countries around the world. Rolling Stone describes the Scorpions as the "heroes of heavy metal", and MTV called them "Ambassadors of Rock". They have received prestigious awards such as three World Music Awards, a star on the Hollywood Rock wall, and a presence in the permanent exhibition of the Rock and Roll Hall of Fame. In 2015, the group celebrated its 50th anniversary.

A biographical film Wind of Change was in production in 2025 aimed at a release to coincide with the band's 60th anniversary celebrations.

=== Influence ===
The Scorpions have been cited as a principal influence or inspiration on numerous hard rock and heavy metal scenes, including artists such as Alice in Chains, Anthrax, Arch Enemy, Carcass, Cinderella, Def Leppard, Doro, Exodus, Green Day, Guns N' Roses, Hanoi Rocks, Helloween, Iron Maiden, Kiss, Yngwie Malmsteen, Megadeth, Metallica, Morbid Angel, Mötley Crüe, Sepultura, Skid Row, Slayer, the Smashing Pumpkins, Testament, and Van Halen.

== Band members ==
Current

- Rudolf Schenker – rhythm guitar, backing vocals (1965–present)
- Klaus Meine – lead vocals (1969–present)
- Matthias Jabs – lead guitar, backing vocals (1978–present)
- Paweł Mąciwoda – bass, backing vocals (2003–present)
- Mikkey Dee – drums (2016–present)

== Awards and honours ==
- 1975: Best German Live Band
- 1976: Album of the Year in Germany – Virgin Killer
- 1979: Playboy magazine: Best artwork of the year for the Lovedrive cover
- 1985: Entry into the Golden Book of Hanover
- 1986: Bravo Otto Band in Silver Category, Hard & Heavy
- 1991: Bravo Otto in Gold Category band, Hard & Heavy
- 1991: Invitation to the Kremlin, reception in the former Soviet state with party leader Mikhail Gorbachev
- 1992: Bravo Otto in bronze category band, Hard & Heavy
- 1992: World Music Award for Best-Selling German Group
- 1992: Echo as the best national group
- 1992: Europe Golden (German: Goldene Europa)
- 1994: World Music Award for World's Best-Selling German Recording Artists
- 1994/95: Collector's tin from Coca Cola
- 1998: Radio Regenbogen Award, Rock International
- 2000: Town of Hanover Plaque (German: Stadtplakette)
- 2000: Entry into the Golden Book of Hanover
- 2000: Cultural Prize of the City of Hanover
- 2001: Scorpions Street in Leganes, Spain
- 2009: Echo Lifetime Achievement award
- 2010: Star on the Hollywood Rock Walk, Los Angeles
- 2010: World Music Awards: Rock Legend Award (special award for outstanding contribution to the development of rock music)
- 2010: Special postage stamp Scorpions for the Brazil tour, published by the Brazilian postal service
- 2010: Walk of Stars Munich
- 2010: Lifetime Achievement Awards, the Hard Rock Cafe chain
- 2011: Radio Regenbogen Award in the category Lifetime Rock
- 2011: Pioneer of Pop – awarded by SWR3-New-Pop-Festival
- 2011: Metal Guru Award from Classic Rock magazine
- 2012: CGDC Award for Music for Dialogue from the Center for Global Dialogue and Cooperation (CGDC)
- 2012: Deutscher Nachhaltigkeitspreis der Städte und Gemeinden
- 2013: Steiger Award
- 2017: 6 th of October is the "Scorpions Day" of the City of Los Angeles
- 2017: Hall of Heavy Metal History, Anaheim, California
- 2017: Wawel Royal Castle (Burg Wawel) Walk of Fame
- June 5, 2023: Inclusion in the Signs of Fame of the Fernwehpark in Oberkotzau
- July 25, 2023: Great Cross of Merit of the Lower Saxony Order of Merit (from the hands of Prime Minister Stephan Weil to Klaus Meine, Rudolf Schenker, Matthias Jabs for their political stance and their voluntary commitment)
- 2024: Handprints on the Walk of Legends, Wacken.
- 2024: Legend Award from Metal Hammer Awards 2024, Berlin.
- 2025: Entry into the Golden Book of Sarstedt (Hometown of Rudolf Schenker)

== Discography ==
Studio albums

- Lonesome Crow (1972)
- Fly to the Rainbow (1974)
- In Trance (1975)
- Virgin Killer (1976)
- Taken by Force (1977)
- Lovedrive (1979)
- Animal Magnetism (1980)
- Blackout (1982)
- Love at First Sting (1984)
- Savage Amusement (1988)
- Crazy World (1990)
- Face the Heat (1993)
- Pure Instinct (1996)
- Eye II Eye (1999)
- Unbreakable (2004)
- Humanity: Hour I (2007)
- Sting in the Tail (2010)
- Return to Forever (2015)
- Rock Believer (2022)

== Tours ==
The Scorpions have played around 5,000 concerts in over 80 countries.

- 1972–1974: Lonesome Crow Tour
- 1974–1975: Fly to the Rainbow Tour
- 1975–1976: In Trance Tour
- 1976–1977: Virgin Killer Tour
- 1977–1978: Taken by Force Tour
- 1979: Lovedrive Tour
- 1980: Animal Magnetism Tour
- 1982–1983: Blackout Tour
- 1984–1986: Love at First Sting Tour
- 1988–1989: Savage Amusement Tour
- 1990–1991: Crazy World Tour
- 1993–1994: Face the Heat Tour
- 1996–1998: Pure Instinct Tour
- 1999: Eye to Eye Tour
- 2000–2001: Moment of Glory Tour
- 2001: Acoustica Tour
- 2002–2003: Bad for Good Tour
- 2004–2006: Unbreakable Tour
- 2007–2009: Humanity Tour
- 2010–2014: Get Your Sting and Blackout World Tour
  - March 2010 – October 2011: Get Your Sting and Blackout
  - November 2011 – December 2012: Final Sting
  - July 2013 – November 2014: Rock 'n' Roll Forever Tour
- 2015–2016: 50th Anniversary World Tour
- 2017–2020: 2017–2020 Crazy World Tour
- 2022–2023: Rock Believer Tour
- 2024: Love at First Sting Tour
- 2025: 60th Anniversary – Coming Home World Tour
- 2026–2027: Coming Home; over 60 Years of Scorpions

=== Concert residencies ===
- 2016: Blackouted in Vegas at the Joint from Hard Rock Hotel and Resort, Las Vegas (5 Shows)
- 2022: Sin City Nights at Zappo Theater from Planet Hollywood Resort Las Vegas (9 Shows)
- 2024: Love at First Sting Las Vegas Residency at Bakkt Theater from Planet Hollywood Resort Las Vegas (9 Shows)
- 2025: Coming Home to Las Vegas, 60 Years of Scorpions Residency at PH Live from Planet Hollywood Resort Las Vegas (5 Shows)
- 2027: Scorpions - Coming Home to Las Vegas Residency at PH Live from Planet Hollywood Resort Las Vegas (8 Shows)

== See also ==
- List of artists who reached number one on the U.S. Mainstream Rock chart
- List of glam metal bands and artists
- List of heavy metal bands
- List of hard rock musicians (N–Z)
- MTV Unplugged - Live in Athens

== Bibliography ==
- Popoff, Martin (2013). Scorpions: Top of the Bill. Power Chord Press. ISBN 978-0-981-10579-6.
- Popoff, Martin (2016). Wind of Change: The Scorpions Story. Wymer Publishing. ISBN 978-1-908-72440-3.
- Prato, Greg (2016). German Metal Machine: Scorpions in the '70s. self-published. ISBN 978-1-519-49167-1.
- Rarebell, Herman (2019). And Speaking of Scorpions... self-published. ISBN 978-1-709-82373-2.
- Schenker, Rudolf (2009). Rock Your Life. sMVG Moderne Vlgs. Ges. ISBN 978-3-868-82019-5.
