= List of Scorpions members =

German rock band from Hanover

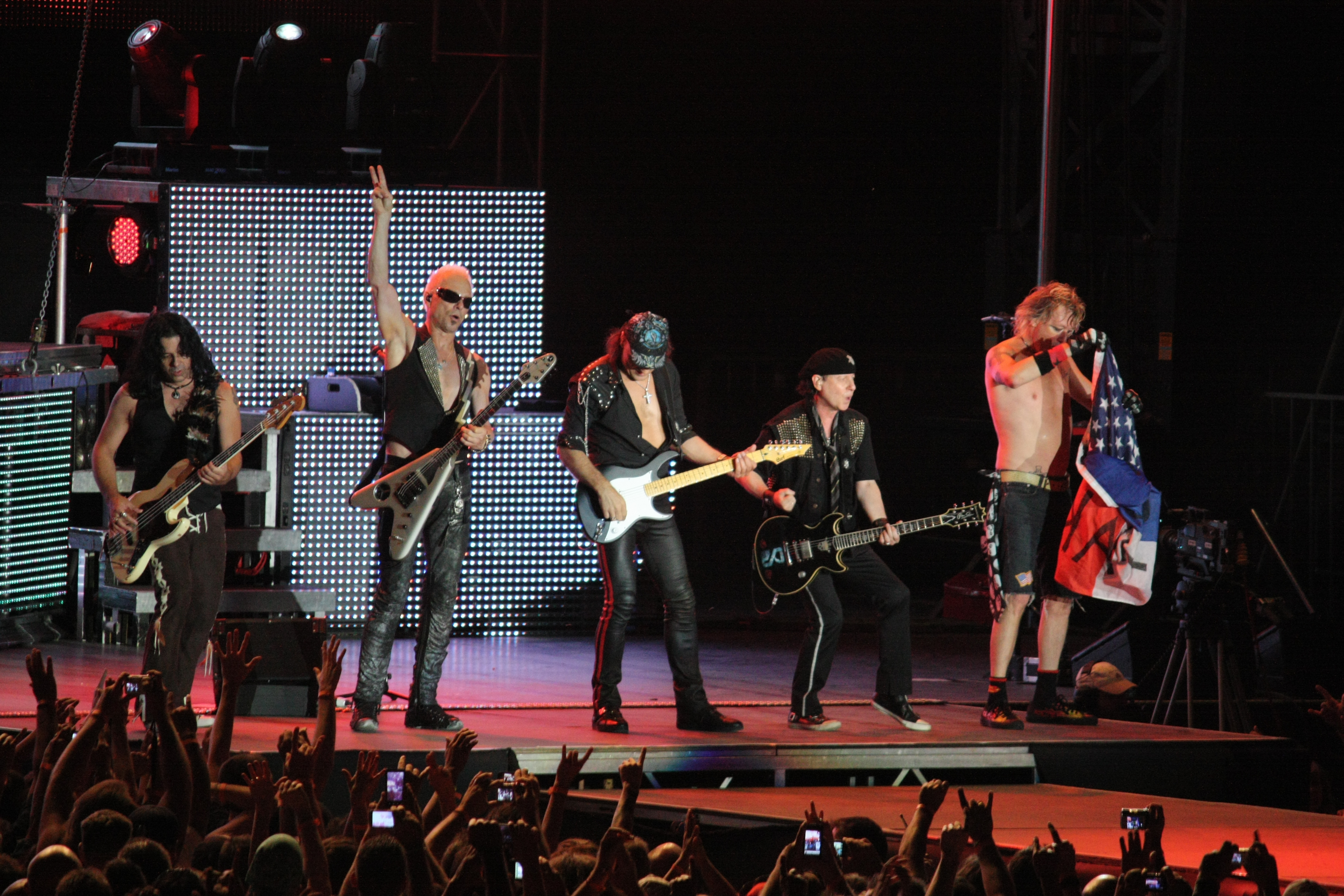
(left to right) Paweł Mąciwoda, Rudolf Schenker, Matthias Jabs, Klaus Meine and James Kottak

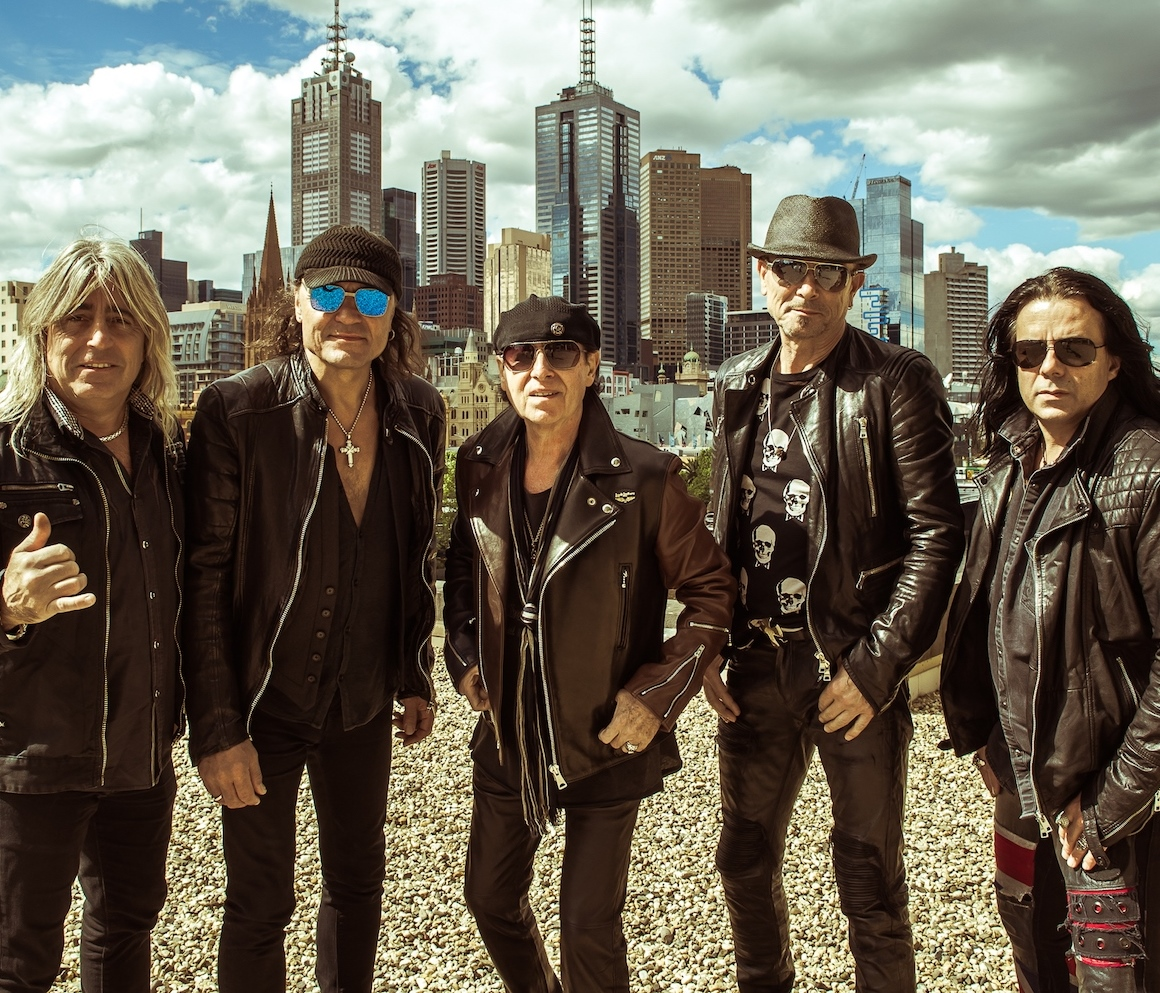
(left to right) Mikkey Dee, Matthias Jabs, Klaus Meine, Rudolf Schenker and Pawel Maciwoda.

Two lineups of Scorpions in 2010 (top) and 2016 (bottom).

Scorpions are a German rock band from Hanover, formed in 1965. The band went through numerous changes in personnel in its early years. Founding by rhythm/lead guitarist Rudolf Schenker and drummer Wolfgang Dziony; both at that point shared lead vocals. In addition to them, the band also included lead/rhythm guitarist Karl-Heinz Vollmer and bassist Achim Kirchhoff.

== History ==
=== 1960s ===
By 1967, Schenker, realizing that he could not sing and play the guitar at the same time, invited the 15-year-old Werner Hoyer to take the place of the vocalist.

At the end of that year, Hoyer and Vollmer left, and their places were soon taken by Bernd Hegner and Ulrich Worobiec.

In the spring of 1968, bass guitarist Achim Kirchhoff was replaced by Lothar Heimberg.

In late, 1969 Hegner and Worobiec also left. After that, the group settled on a lineup which included lead vocalist Klaus Meine, lead guitarist Michael Schenker (Rudolf's younger brother), bass-guitarist Lothar Heimberg and drummer Wolfgang Dziony. It is in this composition that they recorded their debut album Lonesome Crow, released in 1972.

=== 1970s and 1980s ===
Dziony left after the album's release, and was briefly replaced by Werner Löhr. In late 1972 the drummer was Israeli born American Joe Wyman and when he left in December, Dziony came back to complete a tour. For the January 1973 tour with Rory Gallagher they had Helmut Eisenhut on drums. When Eisenhut died and Heimberg left in the summer of 1973, they briefly played with the rhythm section Ewi (bass) and Hal Fingerhood (drums).

When Michael Schenker left to join UFO in July 1973, Rudolf Schenker and Meine briefly disbanded the group and joined Dawn Road, featuring guitarist Uli Jon Roth (who had already replaced Schenker at a festival show in June with Eisenhut back on drums), bass-guitarist Francis Buchholz, drummer Jürgen Rosenthal (later in Eloy) and keyboardist Achim Kirschning; the six-piece later opted to adopt the Scorpions moniker, and in 1974 released Fly to the Rainbow.

Rosenthal left after the recording of Fly to the Rainbow, being replaced first by Jürgen Fechter and later by Rudy Lenners, who performed on In Trance and Virgin Killer. In 1977, Lenners was replaced by Herman Rarebell, whose first recording with the band was Taken by Force. Roth left Scorpions the following year, which he has since explained was because he "began getting dissatisfied with the direction of the music" the band were making. Michael Schenker briefly returned to the band after being fired from UFO in late 1978, performing on four tracks for the album Lovedrive, although he was replaced the following year by Matthias Jabs who had joined around the same time. The Scorpions lineup of Meine, Rudolf Schenker, Jabs, Buchholz and Rarebell remained constant from 1978 and through the 1980s.

=== 1990s ===
After 19 years with the band, bassist Francis Buchholz left Scorpions in 1992. He was replaced by Ralph Rieckermann later in the year. Drummer Rarebell also left four years later, claiming that he was unsatisfied with the band's changing musical direction, and the lack of songwriting input he was able to have in the band. He was replaced in 1996 by James Kottak, after Curt Cress performed on Pure Instinct.

=== 21st century ===
Rieckermann left Scorpions in 2003, with Paweł Mąciwoda taking his place early the following year. Former Motörhead drummer Mikkey Dee replaced Kottak in the band in September 2016.

== Members ==
=== Current ===
Image	Name	Years active	Instruments	Release contributions
	Rudolf Schenker	1965–present	rhythm, lead and slide guitars; backing vocals; lead vocals (1965–1967 and occasionally after)	all Scorpions releases
	Klaus Meine	1969–present	lead and backing vocals; live rhythm guitar and tambourine	all Scorpions releases
	Matthias Jabs	1978–present	lead and rhythm guitars; backing vocals	all Scorpions releases from Lovedrive (1979) onwards
	Paweł Mąciwoda	2004–present	bass; backing vocals	all Scorpions releases from Unbreakable (2004) onwards
	Mikkey Dee	2016–present	drums	Born to Touch Your Feelings: Best of Rock Ballads (2017) – three new tracks; Rock Believer (2022)

=== Former ===
Image	Name	Years active	Instruments	Release contributions
	Wolfgang Dziony	1965–1972; 1972	drums; backing vocals; lead vocals (1965–1967)	Lonesome Crow (1972)
	Achim Kirchhoff	1965–1968 (died 1977)	bass	none
	Karl-Heinz Vollmer	1965–1967	lead and rhythm guitar	none
	Werner Hoyer	1967 (died 2026)	lead vocals	none
	Bernd Hegner	1967–1969	lead vocals	none
	Gerd Andre	1967–1969	lead vocals	none
	Ulrich Worobiec	1967–1969	lead and slide guitar	
	Lothar Heimberg	1968–1973	bass; backing vocals	Lonesome Crow (1972)
	Michael Schenker	1969–1973; 1978–1979 (session); 2006 (guest)	lead and slide guitar; backing vocals	Lonesome Crow (1972); Lovedrive (1979); Live at Wacken Open Air 2006 (2007)
	Werner Löhr	1972	drums	none
	Joe Wyman	1972	drums	none
	Helmut Eisenhut	1973 (until his death)	drums	none
	Hal Fingerhood	1973	drums	none
	"Ewi"	1973	bass	none
	Francis Buchholz	1973–1992 (died 2026)	bass; backing vocals; keyboards (1983–1984)	all Scorpions releases from Fly to the Rainbow (1974) to Crazy World Tour Live... Berlin 1991 (1991); Live Bites (1995)
	Uli Jon Roth	1973–1978; 2006 (guest)	lead and slide guitar; backing and lead vocals	all Scorpions releases from Fly to the Rainbow (1974) to Tokyo Tapes (1978); Live at Wacken Open Air 2006 (2007)
	Achim Kirschning	1973–1974 (1974–1977 session/touring)	keyboards; synthesizers; Mellotron	Fly to the Rainbow (1974); In Trance (1975); Virgin Killer (1976)
	Jürgen Rosenthal	1973–1974	drums	Fly to the Rainbow (1974)
	Jürgen Fechter	1974–1975	drums	none
	Rudy Lenners	1975–1977	drums	In Trance (1975); Virgin Killer (1976)
	Herman Rarebell	1977–1996; 2006 (guest)	drums; percussion; backing vocals; keyboards (1991)	all Scorpions releases from Taken by Force (1977) to Live Bites (1995); Live at Wacken Open Air 2006 (2007)
	Ralph Rieckermann	1993–2003	bass; backing vocals	all Scorpions releases from Face the Heat (1993) to Bad for Good (2002) – two new tracks
	James Kottak	1996–2016 (died 2024)	drums; backing vocals	all Scorpions releases from Eye II Eye (1999) to Forever and a Day (2016)

=== Session ===
Image	Name	Years active	Instruments	Release contributions
	Allan Macmillan	1979–1980	strings and horns arrangements; conductor	Animal Magnetism (1980)
	Adele Arman	1979–1980	violins	Animal Magnetism (1980)
	Victoria Richard	1979–1980	violins	Animal Magnetism (1980)
	Paul Arman	1979–1980	viola	Animal Magnetism (1980)
	Richard Arman	1979–1980	cello	Animal Magnetism (1980)
	Charles Elliot	1979–1980	double bass	Animal Magnetism (1980)
	Melvin Berman	1979–1980 (died 2008)	oboe	Animal Magnetism (1980)
	George Stimpson	1979–1980	French horns	Animal Magnetism (1980)
	Brad Wamaar	1979–1980	French horns	Animal Magnetism (1980)
	Tom Croucier	1981–1982	bass	Blackout (1982)
	Don Dokken	1981–1982	backing vocals	Blackout (1982)
	Lee Aaron	1987–1988	backing vocals	Savage Amusement (1988)
	Peter Baltes	1987–1988	vocals	Savage Amusement (1988)
	Koen van Baal	1990; 1996	keyboards; arrangements	Crazy World (1990); Pure Instinct (1996); Unbreakable (2004)
	Jim Vallance	1990	keyboards	Crazy World (1990)
	Roy Tesse	1990	"gang" vocals	Crazy World (1990)
	Dries van der Schuyt	1990	"gang" vocals	Crazy World (1990)
	Ria Makker	1990	"gang" vocals	Crazy World (1990)
	Gerard v.d. Pot	1990	"gang" vocals	Crazy World (1990)
	Louis Spillman	1990	"gang" vocals	Crazy World (1990)
	Wolfgang Praetz	1990	"gang" vocals	Crazy World (1990)
	Inka Esser	1990	"gang" vocals	Crazy World (1990)
	Claudia Frohling	1990	"gang" vocals	Crazy World (1990)
	Cliff Roles	1990	"gang" vocals	Crazy World (1990)
	Peter Angmeer	1990	"gang" vocals	Crazy World (1990)
	Rusty Powell	1990	"gang" vocals	Crazy World (1990)
	Tony Ioannoua	1990	"gang" vocals	Crazy World (1990)
	Jim Lewis	1990	"gang" vocals	Crazy World (1990)
	Erwin Musper	1990	"gang" vocals; "bang" vocals	Crazy World (1990)
	Keith Olsen	1990	"gang" vocals; "bang" vocals	Crazy World (1990)
	Marcel Gelderblom	1990	"bang" vocals	Crazy World (1990)
	Mirjam Erftemeijer	1990	"bang" vocals	Crazy World (1990)
	Henk Horden	1990	"bang" vocals	Crazy World (1990)
	Patrick Ulenberg	1990	"bang" vocals	Crazy World (1990)
	John Webster	1993	keyboards	Face the Heat (1993)
	Luke Herzog	1993	keyboards; arrangements	Face the Heat (1993)
	Helen Donath	1993	opera voice	Face the Heat (1993)
	Rhian Gittins	1993	girl's voice	Face the Heat (1993)
	Paul Laine	1993	backing vocals	Face the Heat (1993)
	Mark LaFrance	1993	backing vocals	Face the Heat (1993)
	Bruce Fairbairn	1993 (died 1999)	backing vocals	Face the Heat (1993)
	Mark Hudson	1993	backing vocals	Face the Heat (1993)
	Curt Cress	1996	drums; percussion	Pure Instinct (1996)
	Pitti Hecht	1996	percussion	Pure Instinct (1996)
	Luke Herzog	1996	keyboards	Pure Instinct (1996)
	David Foster	1996	keyboards	Pure Instinct (1996)
	Claude Gaudette	1996	keyboards	Pure Instinct (1996)
	Peter Wolf	1998–1999	keyboards and piano	Eye II Eye (1999)
	Mick Jones	1998–1999	acoustic guitar	Eye II Eye (1999)
	Michelle Wolf	1998–1999	backing vocals	Eye II Eye (1999)
	Siedah Garrett	1998–1999	backing vocals	Eye II Eye (1999)
	Lynn Davis	1998–1999	backing vocals	Eye II Eye (1999)
	James Ingram	1998–1999 (died 2019)	backing vocals	Eye II Eye (1999)
	Phil Perry	1998–1999	backing vocals	Eye II Eye (1999)
	Kevin Dorsey	1998–1999	backing vocals	Eye II Eye (1999)
	Lyn Liechty	2000	vocals	Moment of Glory (2000)
	Ray Wilson	2000	vocals	Moment of Glory (2000)
	Zucchero	2000	vocals	Moment of Glory (2000)
	Guenther Becker	2000	sitar	Moment of Glory (2000)
	Stefan Schrupp	2000	drum and computer programming	Moment of Glory (2000)
	Gumpoldtskirchener Spatzen, Vienna	2000	children's choir	Moment of Glory (2000)
	Vince Pirillo	2000	choir	Moment of Glory (2000)
	Kai Petersen	2000	choir	Moment of Glory (2000)
	Michael Perfler	2000	choir	Moment of Glory (2000)
	Susie Webb	2000	backing vocals	Moment of Glory (2000)
	Zoë Nicholas	2000	backing vocals	Moment of Glory (2000)
	Rita Campbell	2000	backing vocals	Moment of Glory (2000)
	Melanie Marshall	2000	backing vocals	Moment of Glory (2000)
	Ken Taylor	2000	bass	Moment of Glory (2000)
	Barry Sparks	2003–2004	bass	Unbreakable (2004)
	Ingo Powitzer	2003–2004	bass	Unbreakable (2004)
	Ralph de Jongh	2003–2004	backing vocals	Unbreakable (2004)
	Joss Mennen	2003–2004	backing vocals	Unbreakable (2004)
	Alex Jansen	2003–2004	backing vocals	Unbreakable (2004)
	Jody's Kids Choir	2003–2004	additional vocals	Unbreakable (2004)
	Billy Corgan	2006–2017	vocals	Humanity: Hour I (2007)
	Eric Bazilian	2006–2017	guitar	Humanity: Hour I (2007)
	John 5	2006–2017	guitar	Humanity: Hour I (2007)
	Russ Irwin	2006–2017	piano	Humanity: Hour I (2007)
	Harry Sommerdahl	2006–2017	programming	Humanity: Hour I (2007)
	Jason Paige	2006–2017	backing vocals	Humanity: Hour I (2007)
	Jeanette Olsson	2006–2017	backing vocals	Humanity: Hour I (2007)
	Desmond Child	2006–2017	backing vocals	Humanity: Hour I (2007)
	James Michael	2006–2017	backing vocals	Humanity: Hour I (2007)
	Angela Whittaker	2006–2017	voice-overs	Humanity: Hour I (2007)
	Roman Shaw Child	2006–2017	voice-overs	Humanity: Hour I (2007)
	David Campbell	2006–2017	orchestra conductor	Humanity: Hour I (2007)
	Tarja Turunen	2009	vocals	Sting in the Tail (2010)
	Mikael Nord Andersson	2009	gang vocals	Sting in the Tail (2010)
	Ingo Powitzer	2020–2021	additional guitars and bass; guitar solo; additional background vocals; claps; guitar arrangements	Rock Believer (2022)
	Jakob Himmelein	2020–2021	additional background vocals; claps	Rock Believer (2022)
	Alex Malek	2020–2021	additional background vocals; claps	Rock Believer (2022)
	Hans-Martin Buff	2020–2021	additional background vocals; claps	Rock Believer (2022)
	Pitti Hecht	2020–2021	percussion	Rock Believer (2022)

== Lineups ==
Period	Members	Releases
1965 – 1967	Rudolf Schenker – rhythm, lead and slide guitars, vocals; Wolfgang Dziony – drums, vocals; Achim Kirchhoff – bass; Karl-Heinz Vollmer – lead and rhythm guitars	none
1967	Rudolf Schenker – rhythm, lead and slide guitars, vocals; Wolfgang Dziony – drums, backing vocals; Achim Kirchhoff – bass; Karl-Heinz Vollmer – lead and rhythm guitars; Werner Hoyer – vocals	none
1967 – March 1968	Rudolf Schenker – rhythm guitar, backing vocals; Wolfgang Dziony – drums, backing vocals; Achim Kirchhoff – bass; Ulrich Worobiec – lead and slide guitar; Bernd Hegner – vocals	none
April 1968 – November 1969	Rudolf Schenker – rhythm guitar, backing vocals; Wolfgang Dziony – drums, backing vocals; Ulrich Worobiec – lead and slide guitar; Bernd Hegner – vocals; Lothar Heimberg – bass, backing vocals	none
December 1969 – May 1972	Rudolf Schenker – rhythm guitar, backing vocals; Wolfgang Dziony – drums, backing vocals; Lothar Heimberg – bass, backing vocals; Klaus Meine – vocals; Michael Schenker – lead and slide guitar	Lonesome Crow (1972)
May – July 1972	Rudolf Schenker – rhythm guitar, backing vocals; Lothar Heimberg – bass, backing vocals; Klaus Meine – vocals; Michael Schenker – lead and slide guitar; Werner Löhr – drums	none
July – October 1972, December 1972	Rudolf Schenker – rhythm guitar, backing vocals; Lothar Heimberg – bass, backing vocals; Klaus Meine – vocals; Michael Schenker – lead and slide guitar; Wolfgang Dziony – drums, backing vocals	none
November – December 1972	Rudolf Schenker – rhythm guitar, backing vocals; Lothar Heimberg – bass, backing vocals; Klaus Meine – vocals; Michael Schenker – lead and slide guitar; Joe Wyman – drums	none
January – April 1973	Rudolf Schenker – rhythm guitar, backing vocals; "Ewi" – bass, backing vocals; Klaus Meine – vocals; Michael Schenker – lead and slide guitar; Helmut Eisenhut – drums	none
May - June 1973	Rudolf Schenker – rhythm guitar, backing vocals; Lothar Heimberg – bass, backing vocals; Klaus Meine – vocals; Michael Schenker – lead and slide guitar; Helmut Eisenhut – drums	none
July 1973 – May 1974	Rudolf Schenker – rhythm guitar, backing vocals; Klaus Meine – vocals; Francis Buchholz – bass; Ulrich Roth – lead and slide guitar, vocals; Jürgen Rosenthal – drums; Achim Kirschning – keyboards, synthesizers (session and touring)	Fly to the Rainbow (1974)
June 1974 - January 1975	Rudolf Schenker - rhythm guitar, backing vocals; Klaus Meine - vocals; Francis Buchholz - bass; Ulrich Roth - lead and slide guitar, vocals; Jurgen "Doobie" Fechter - drums	none
February 1975 – May 1977	Rudolf Schenker – rhythm guitar, backing vocals; Klaus Meine – vocals; Francis Buchholz – bass; Ulrich Roth – lead and slide guitar, vocals; Rudy Lenners – drums; Achim Kirschning – keyboards, synthesizers (session and touring)	In Trance (1975); Virgin Killer (1976)
May 1977 – April 1978	Rudolf Schenker – rhythm guitar, backing vocals; Klaus Meine – vocals; Francis Buchholz – bass; Ulrich Roth – lead and slide guitar, vocals; Herman Rarebell – drums	Taken by Force (1977); Tokyo Tapes (1978)
August 1978 – December 1978	Rudolf Schenker – rhythm and slide guitar, backing vocals; Klaus Meine – vocals; Francis Buchholz – bass; Herman Rarebell – drums; Matthias Jabs – lead guitar	Lovedrive (1979)
December 1978 – April 1979	Rudolf Schenker – rhythm, lead and slide guitars, backing vocals; Klaus Meine – vocals; Francis Buchholz – bass; Herman Rarebell – drums; Michael Schenker – lead and slide guitar	Lovedrive (1979)
April 1979 – October 1992	Rudolf Schenker – rhythm, lead and slide guitars, backing vocals; Klaus Meine – vocals; Francis Buchholz – bass, backing vocals; Herman Rarebell – drums, backing vocals; Matthias Jabs – lead and rhythm guitars, backing vocals	Animal Magnetism (1980); Blackout (1982); Love at First Sting (1984); World Wide Live (1985); Savage Amusement (1988); Crazy World (1990); Crazy World Tour Live... Berlin 1991 (1991)
November 1992 – January 1996	Rudolf Schenker – rhythm, lead and slide guitars, backing vocals; Klaus Meine – vocals; Herman Rarebell – drums; Matthias Jabs – lead and rhythm guitars, backing vocals; Ralph Rieckermann – bass, backing vocals	Face the Heat (1993); Live Bites (1995)
January 1996 – August 1996	Rudolf Schenker – rhythm, lead and slide guitars, backing vocals; Klaus Meine – vocals; Matthias Jabs – lead and rhythm guitars, backing vocals; Ralph Rieckermann – bass, backing vocals; Curt Cress – drums (session)	Pure Instinct (1996)
August 1996 – December 2003	Rudolf Schenker – rhythm, lead and slide guitars, backing vocals; Klaus Meine – vocals; Matthias Jabs – lead and rhythm guitars, backing vocals; Ralph Rieckermann – bass, backing vocals; James Kottak – drums, backing vocals	Eye II Eye (1999); Moment of Glory (2000); Moment of Glory Live (2000); Acoustica (2001); Bad for Good (2002) – two new tracks
January 2004 – September 2016	Rudolf Schenker – rhythm, lead and slide guitars, backing vocals; Klaus Meine – vocals; Matthias Jabs – lead and rhythm guitars, backing vocals; James Kottak – drums, backing vocals; Paweł Mąciwoda – bass, backing vocals	Unbreakable (2004); Unbreakable: One Night in Vienna (2004); Humanity: Hour I (2007); Live at Wacken Open Air 2006 (2007); Amazonia: Live in the Jungle (2009); Sting in the Tail (2010); Live 2011: Get Your Sting & Blackout (2011); Comeblack (2011); MTV Unplugged in Athens (2013); Return to Forever (2015); Forever and a Day (2016)
September 2016 – present	Rudolf Schenker – rhythm, lead and slide guitars, backing vocals; Klaus Meine – vocals; Matthias Jabs – lead and rhythm guitars, backing vocals; Paweł Mąciwoda – bass, backing vocals; Mikkey Dee – drums	Born to Touch Your Feelings: Best of Rock Ballads (2017) – three new tracks; Rock Believer (2022)
