= Taken B-Side =

Compilation album by Scorpions
- Released: 2009
- Recorded: 1975–2007
- Genres: Rock, heavy metal
- Label: Sony BMG
- Producer: Various

Taken B-Side is an unofficial compilation album of recordings by German rock band Scorpions, released in 2009. It contains songs that were released only as bonus tracks of certain studio albums and cover versions, live tracks and B-sides of some singles. Two of the tracks are not in the rock genre and were not performed by the band. One of them was based on a poem and it involved only the lead vocalist.

== Track list ==
Disc 1
No.	Title	Writer(s)	Notes	Length
1.	"Cold"	Matthias Jabs, Desmond Child, Eric Bazilian, Marti Frederiksen		3:54
2.	"I Can't Explain"	Pete Townshend	Original version by The Who	3:25
3.	"Dreamers"	Klaus Meine, Rudolf Schenker, Bazilian		4:50
4.	"Too Far"	Jabs, Meine		3:08
5.	"Edge of Time"	Schenker, Meine		4:18
6.	"Heroes Don't Cry"	Schenker, Meine		4:33
7.	"You and I"	Meine	"Butcher" radio mix	4:02
8.	"She's Knocking at My Door"	Schenker, Meine		3:21
9.	"Alex & Julie's Love Theme"	Trevor Jones	Non-Scorpions song	2:11
10.	"Daddy's Girl"	Schenker, Meine		4:21
11.	"Ave María no morro"	Herivelto Martins; Spanish lyrics: Manuel Salinas	Original version by Trio San José	3:24
12.	"Partners in Crime"	Schenker, Meine		4:26
13.	"You and I"	Meine	Special single mix	4:23
14.	"Kami O Shin Jiru [sic]"	Schenker, Meine	Meine mispronounces "shinjiru" as "shin'yuru"	3:51
15.	"Rhythm of Love"	Schenker, Meine	Acoustic version	5:28
16.	"Humanity"	Meine, Child, Bazilian	Radio edit (including orchestra)	4:07
17.	"White Dove"	Gábor Presser, Anna Adamis; English lyrics: Schenker, Meine	English version of Omega song "Gyöngyhajú lány"	4:23
18.	"Veter peremen (Ветер перемен)"	Meine; Russian lyrics: David Tal	Russian version of "Wind of Change"; radio edit	3:44
19.	"You Are the Champion"	Freddie Mercury	Cover version of Queen's "We Are the Champions"	3:30

Disc 2
No.	Title	Writer(s)	Notes	Length
1.	"'Cause I Love You"	Schenker, Meine		3:47
2.	"Rubber Fucker"	Herman Rarebell		3:40
3.	"Kiss of Borrowed Time"	Meine		3:38
4.	"Bad for Good"	Schenker, Meine, Dieter Dierks		4:04
5.	"When Love Kills Love"	Schenker, Meine	Studio version	3:45
6.	"Hey You"	Schenker, Meine, Rarebell	Remixed version	3:51
7.	"Over the Top"	Jabs		4:27
8.	"Viento de cambio"	Meine; Spanish lyrics: Unknown	Spanish version of "Wind of Change"	5:12
9.	"Life Goes Around"	Schenker, Meine		3:44
10.	"(Marie's the Name) His Latest Flame"	Doc Pomus, Mort Shuman	Original version by Del Shannon, later recorded by Elvis Presley	2:22
11.	"Miracle"	Jabs, Thomas Nöhre, Meine		4:24
12.	"Mind Power"	Meine		4:30
13.	"Love Is Blind"	Rarebell	Also in the 1999 compilation album Best	3:57
14.	"Start Me Up"	Jabs, Schenker, Meine, James Kottak	English version of "Du bist so schmutzig"	4:07
15.	"When You Came Into My Life"	Meine, Schenker, Titiek Puspa, James F. Sundah	Re-recorded version	4:30
16.	"Back to You"	Meine		4:26
17.	"Fuchs geh' voran"	Brian Connolly, Steve Priest, Andy Scott, Mick Tucker; German lyrics: Carl-Ulrich Blecher	Recorded in 1975 as "The Hunters". German cover of Sweet song "Fox on the Run"	3:19
18.	"We Don't Own the World"	Schenker, Meine	Most copies omit track 18 to conserve disc space	8:00
19.	"Bis wohin reicht mein Leben"	Rainer Maria Rilke	Non-Scorpions song, with Senait and Zabine. Listed as track 18 on most releases	4:52

== Track details ==
Disc 1

- 1. Bonus track on the Japanese edition of Humanity: Hour I
- 2. From the compilation albums Stairway to Heaven/Highway to Hell and Best of Rockers 'n' Ballads
- 3, 4. Bonus tracks on the Japanese edition of Unbreakable
- 5. Studio track on the US edition of Live Bites
- 6. Studio track on the non-US edition of Live Bites
- 7. Bonus track on the Japanese edition of Eye II Eye
- 8. Bonus track on the Japanese edition of Pure Instinct
- 9. From the "Hit Between the Eyes" CD single and Freejack soundtrack
- 10. Bonus track on the Japanese and European editions of Face the Heat
- 11. From the "White Dove" CD single
- 12. From the "Under the Same Sun" maxi single
- 13. From the "You and I" CD single
- 14. Bonus track on the Japanese edition of Face the Heat
- 15. Bonus track on the Japanese edition of Acoustica
- 16. From the "Humanity" CD single
- 17. Studio track on the non-US edition of Live Bites
- 18. From the Japanese mini album Wind of Change
- 19. From the "You Are the Champion" CD single

Disc 2

- 1, 4. From the compilation album Bad for Good: The Very Best of Scorpions
- 2. From the "Alien Nation" maxi single
- 3, 15. From the "When You Came Into My Life" CD single
- 5. From the "When Love Kills Love" CD single
- 6. From the European edition of Best of Rockers 'n' Ballads
- 7, 9. From the US edition of the compilation album Deadly Sting
- 8. From the "Veter peremen" CD single
- 10. Hidden track on the US edition of Face the Heat
- 11. From the "Miracle" CD single
- 12. From the "To Be No. 1" CD single
- 13. From the "Still Loving You" CD single
- 14. From the "10 Light Years Away" CD single
- 16. From the Acoustica DVD
- 17. From the "Fuchs geh' voran" vinyl single
- 18. From the Moment of Glory DVD
- 19. From the Schönherz & Fleer album Rilke Projekt – "In meinem wilden Herzen"

== Personnel ==
Band members

- Klaus Meine – lead vocals, tambourine
- Matthias Jabs – lead guitar, acoustic guitar (disc 1 tracks 11, 15; disc 2 tracks 5, 10, 16), talk box (disc 2 tracks 1, 13), rhythm guitar (disc 2 track 3), backing vocals
- Rudolf Schenker – rhythm guitar, acoustic guitar (disc 1 tracks 4, 6, 10, 14, 15, 17; disc 2 tracks 3, 5, 10, 11, 16), co-lead vocals (disc 2 tracks 6, 17), lead guitar (disc 2 track 8), backing vocals
- Paweł Mąciwoda – bass guitar (disc 1 tracks 1, 3, 16, 19), backing vocals

Past members

- Uli Jon Roth – lead guitar and co-lead vocals (disc 2 track 17)
- Ralph Rieckermann – bass guitar (disc 1 tracks 5–8, 11–15, 17; disc 2 tracks 1–5, 7, 9, 11–16, 18), upright bass (disc 2 track 10), backing vocals
- Francis Buchholz – bass guitar (disc 1 track 18; disc 2 tracks 6, 8, 17), backing vocals
- James Kottak – drums and percussion (disc 1 tracks 1, 3, 4, 15, 16; disc 2 tracks 1, 4, 5, 11–16, 18), backing vocals, rapping (disc 2 track 14)
- Herman Rarebell – drums (disc 1 tracks 2, 5, 6, 11, 12, 14, 17, 18; disc 2 tracks 2, 6–10), backing vocals
- Rudy Lenners – drums (disc 2 track 17)

Additional musicians

On "Edge of Time" and "You and I" (single edit):

- Luke Herzog – keyboards

On "Heroes Don't Cry":

- Richard Baker – orchestration programming
- Fred White, Linda McCrary, Alfie Silas, Ricky Nelson – choir

On "Alex & Julie's Love Theme":

- Brad Dechter – orchestrator
- Artie Kane – conductor
- Tom Boyd – oboe soloist

On "You and I" (single edit), "Veter peremen", "You Are the Champion" and "Viento de cambio":

- Koen van Bael – keyboards

On "When You Came Into My Life":

- David Foster – keyboards, arranger

On "You and I" (both single edit and "Butcher" radio mix), "She's Knocking at My Door" and "Kiss of Borrowed Time":

- Curt Cress – drums, percussion

On "You and I" ("Butcher" radio mix):

- Unknown session musicians – ukulele, violin

On "White Dove":

- Kinderchor Majell Lustenhouwer – children's choir
- Rocq-E Harrel – additional vocals

On "Kami O Shin Jiru":

- Unknown session musicians – biwa, shamisen

On "Veter peremen" and "Viento de cambio":

- Robbie Buchanan – keyboards

On "Humanity" (radio edit):

- David Campbell – orchestra conductor

On "You Are the Champion":

- Michael Kleitman – additional vocals
- Hans Eijkenaar – drums
- Joss Mennen – backing vocals

On "Marie's the Name (His Latest Flame)":

- Unknown session musicians – saxophone, trumpet

On "Rhythm of Love" and "Back to You":

- Christian Kolonovits – piano, Hammond organ
- Johan Daansen – acoustic guitar
- Mario Argandoña – percussion
- Hille Bemelmanns, Liv Van Aelst, Kristel Van Craen − backing vocals

On "Fuchs geh' voran":

- Achim Kirschning – synthesizer, keyboards

On "We Don't Own the World":

- The Berlin Philharmonic Orchestra

On "Bis wohin reicht mein Leben":

- Senait – spoken word vocals
- Zabine – additional vocals
- Dawn-Faith Schönherz – choir
- Ossi Schaller – guitars
- Edvin Marton – violin
- Richard Schönherz – arranger
