= Born to Touch Your Feelings: Best of Rock Ballads =

Compilation album by Scorpions
- Released: 24 November 2017
- Recorded: 1979–2017
- Genre: Hard rock
- Length: 78:25
- Label: Sony Music
- Producers: Mikael Nord Andersson; Dieter Dierks; Bruce Fairbairn; Martin Hansen; Scorpions

Scorpions compilations chronology
| Icon 2 (2010) | Born to Touch Your Feelings: Best of Rock Ballads (2017) |

Singles from Born to Touch Your Feelings: Best of Rock Ballads
- 1. "Follow Your Heart (New 2017 Version)" Released: 10 November 2017

Born to Touch Your Feelings: Best of Rock Ballads is a compilation album by German rock band Scorpions. It includes the most popular Scorpions ballads, with a brand new acoustic studio version of the song "Send Me an Angel", a new full band studio version of the song "Follow Your Heart" and two brand new songs "Melrose Avenue" and "Always Be with You" that were written specifically for this compilation.

== Background and concept ==
Record label Sony Music contacted Scorpions and said that they wanted to release a compilation album consisting of their most popular ballads. They also suggested that the band record a couple of new songs that would be included with all those ballads. The band went into the studio and everybody in there came up with new song ideas. They wrote and recorded "Melrose Avenue" and "Always Be with You". "Melrose Avenue" is the newest song composed by Matthias Jabs. It is named after one of the most popular strips in Los Angeles and it talks about the enchanting sense of life in California. "Always Be with You" is a brand new song written by Rudolf Schenker. Written shortly after the birth of his youngest son, it is a declaration of love and a story of change. Before doing an interview for Sirius XM Satellite Radio on 12 September 2017, the band finished recording sessions and listened to the first mixes of the songs.

On 22 October 2017, the band announced the compilation album title and track listing. The album is a compilation of 17 ballads. It includes MTV Unplugged versions of the songs "Born to Touch Your Feelings" and "When You Came into My Life", both of which were previously released on the bonus disc called "Studio Edits" which was part of the MTV Unplugged: Live in Athens Tour Edition. It also includes 2011 versions of the songs "Wind of Change" and "Still Loving You" which were released on Comeblack (2011), 2015 remastered versions of the songs "Always Somewhere", "Holiday", "When the Smoke Is Going Down" and "Lady Starlight". Furthermore, it includes "Lonely Nights" from the album Face the Heat (1993), "Gypsy Life" from the album Return to Forever (2015), "The Best Is Yet to Come" from the album Sting in the Tail (2010). Also, it includes a radio edit of the song "Eye of the Storm", which was only available on a digital single release of the same song, and a single edit version of the song "House of Cards". It also includes a brand new acoustic version of the song "Send Me An Angel", a full-band version of the song "Follow Your Heart" (previously played and sung by Klaus Meine on his own during the MTV Unplugged show), and two brand new ballads: "Melrose Avenue" and "Always Be with You".

== Release ==
On 10 November 2017, "Follow Your Heart" (new 2017 version) was released as the compilation's lead single. On 15 November 2017, lyrics video for the song "Follow Your Heart" was also released. The album was released worldwide on 24 November 2017 on CD, double heavy gatefold LP, as digital download and it is also available for streaming.

== Track listing ==
All lyrics are written by Klaus Meine, except where noted; all music is composed by Rudolf Schenker, except where noted.

| No. | Title | Writer(s) | Length |
|---|---|---|---|
| 1. | "Born to Touch Your Feelings" (studio edit from MTV Unplugged: Live in Athens – Tour Edition, 2014) | | 4:02 |
| 2. | "Still Loving You" (from Comeblack, 2011) | | 6:43 |
| 3. | "Wind of Change" (from Comeblack, 2011) | Music: Meine | 5:08 |
| 4. | "Always Somewhere" (2015 remastered version) | | 4:54 |
| 5. | "Send Me an Angel" (new 2017 acoustic version) | | 4:19 |
| 6. | "Holiday" (2015 remastered version) | | 6:31 |
| 7. | "Eye of the Storm" (radio edit from "Eye of the Storm" single, 2015) | Music: Meine, Mikael Nord Andersson, Martin Hansen | 3:22 |
| 8. | "When the Smoke Is Going Down" (2015 remastered version) | | 3:51 |
| 9. | "Lonely Nights" (from Face the Heat, 1993) | | 4:49 |
| 10. | "Gypsy Life" (from Return to Forever, 2015) | | 4:52 |
| 11. | "House of Cards" (single edit from "We Built This House" 7" single, 2015) | | 4:28 |
| 12. | "The Best Is Yet to Come" (from Sting in the Tail, 2010) | Lyrics: Schenker, Eric Bazilian, Fredrik Thomander, Anders Wikström / Music: Bazilian, Thomander, Wikström | 4:32 |
| 13. | "When You Came into My Life" (studio edit from MTV Unplugged: Live in Athens – Tour Edition, 2014) | Meine, Schenker, Titiek Puspa, James F. Sundah | 3:32 |
| 14. | "Lady Starlight" (2015 remastered version) | | 6:16 |
| 15. | "Follow Your Heart" (new 2017 version) | Music: Meine | 4:05 |
| 16. | "Melrose Avenue" (New Song) | Lyrics: Meine, Matthias Jabs / Music: Jabs | 3:32 |
| 17. | "Always Be with You" (New Song) | Lyrics: Meine, Andersson, Hansen | 3:29 |
| Total length: | | | 78:25 |

== Personnel ==
Scorpions

- Klaus Meine – lead vocals
- Rudolf Schenker – rhythm guitars, backing vocals, lead guitar on "Still Loving You", "Wind of Change" and "When the Smoke Is Going Down"
- Matthias Jabs – lead guitars, backing vocals, arrangement on "Born to Touch Your Feelings" (studio edit) and "When You Came Into My Life" (studio edit), rhythm guitar on "Still Loving You", "Wind of Change" and "When the Smoke Is Going Down"
- Paweł Mąciwoda – bass, backing vocals
- Mikkey Dee – drums on "Follow Your Heart" and "Melrose Avenue"

Additional musicians

- Mikael Nord Andersson – guitars, mandolin, backing vocals, arrangement, string arrangement on "Born to Touch Your Feelings" (studio edit) and "When You Came Into My Life" (studio edit)
- Martin Hansen – guitars, backing vocals, arrangement, string arrangement on "Born to Touch Your Feelings" (studio edit) and "When You Came Into My Life" (studio edit)
- Hans Gardemar – piano, arrangement, string arrangement on "Born to Touch Your Feelings" (studio edit) and "When You Came into My Life" (studio edit) and string arrangement on "Send Me an Angel" (acoustic version 2017)

All uncredited:

- Michael Schenker – lead and acoustic guitars, backing vocals on "Holiday"
- Francis Buchholz – bass, backing vocals on "Always Somewhere", "Holiday", "When the Smoke Is Going Down" and "Lady Starlight"
- Ralph Rieckermann – bass, backing vocals on "Lonely Nights"
- Herman Rarebell – drums on "Always Somewhere", "Holiday", "When the Smoke Is Going Down", "Lonely Nights" and "Lady Starlight"
- James Kottak – drums on "Still Loving You", "Wind of Change", "Eye of the Storm", "Gypsy Life", "House of Cards" and "The Best Is Yet to Come"
- John Webster – keyboards on "Lonely Nights"
- Luke Herzog – additional keyboards on "Lonely Nights"
- Allan Macmillan – strings and horns arrangements, conductor on "Lady Starlight"
- Adele Arman, Victoria Richard – violins on "Lady Starlight"
- Paul Arman – viola on "Lady Starlight"
- Richard Arman – cello on "Lady Starlight"
- Charles Elliot – bass on "Lady Starlight"
- Melvin Berman – oboe on "Lady Starlight"
- George Stimpson, Brad Wamaar – French horns on "Lady Starlight"

Technical personnel

- Bruce Fairbairn – production on "Lonely Nights"
- Scorpions – production on "Lonely Nights"
- Mikael Nord Andersson – production, recording, mixing
- Martin Hansen – production, recording, mixing
- Mats Lindfors – mastering on "Born to Touch Your Feelings" (studio edit)
- Ryan Smith – mastering on "Still Loving You" (Comeblack version) and "Wind of Change" (Comeblack version)
- Classe Persson – mastering on "Send Me an Angel" (acoustic version 2017), Follow Your Heart (new 2017 version), "Melrose Avenue" and "Always Be with You"
- MM Sound – mastering on "Eye of the Storm" (radio edit)
- Mats "Limpan" Lindfors – mastering on "Born to Touch Your Feelings" (studio edit), "Gypsy Life", "House of Cards" (single edit) and "When You Came Into My Life" (studio edit)
- George Marino – mastering on "The Best Is Yet to Come" and (uncredited) "Lonely Nights"
- Hans Martin Buff – guitar recording engineer on "Melrose Avenue" and "Always Be with You"
- Ellen Von Unwerth – artwork
- Moritz "Mumpi" Kunster – additional artwork
- Stefan Klein – additional artwork

All uncredited:

- Dieter Dierks – production and engineer on "Always Somewhere", "Holiday" and "When the Smoke Is Going Down", production on "Lady Starlight", mixing on "Always Somewhere" and "Holiday"
- David Green – engineer on "Lady Starlight"
- Gerd Rautenbach – mixing on "When the Smoke Is Going Down"
- Erwin Musper – engineer and mixing on "Lonely Nights"
- Mike Plotnikoff – engineer on "Lonely Nights"
- Steve Fallone – mastering on "Always Somewhere", "Holiday" and "Lady Starlight"
- Bob Ludwig and Howie Weinberg – mastering on "When the Smoke Is Going Down"

== Charts ==
| Chart (2017) | Peak position |
|---|---|
| Belgian Albums (Ultratop Flanders) | 54 |
| Belgian Albums (Ultratop Wallonia) | 56 |
| French Albums (SNEP) | 81 |
| German Albums (Offizielle Top 100) | 42 |
| Greek Albums (IFPI) | 21 |
| Japanese Albums (Oricon) | 141 |
| South Korean Albums (Circle) | 15 |
| Portuguese Albums (AFP) | 23 |
| Spanish Albums (Promusicae) | 43 |
| Swiss Albums (Schweizer Hitparade) | 48 |
| UK Rock & Metal Albums (Official Charts) | 22 |
