= Crazy World Tour Live... Berlin 1991 =

Video by Scorpions
- Released: 1991
- Recorded: Deutschlandhalle, Berlin, Germany, December 1990
- Genre: Hard rock, heavy metal
- Length: 75 min.
- Label: Mercury/PolyGram
- Producer: Dana Marshall, Scott McGhee

Scorpions video albums chronology
To Russia with Love and Other Savage Amusements (1988)	Crazy World Tour Live... Berlin 1991 (1991)	Moment of Glory Live (2000)

Crazy World Tour Live... Berlin 1991 is a 1991 live video by German band Scorpions. The concert was recorded in Berlin, Germany.

1. "Bad Boys Running Wild"
2. "Hit Between the Eyes"
3. "Tease Me Please Me" (VideoClip)
4. "I Can't Explain"
5. "The Zoo"
6. "Don't Believe Her" (VideoClip)
7. "Rhythm of Love"
8. "Crazy World"
9. "Can‘t Live Without You"
10. "Blackout"
11. "Dynamite"
12. "Lust or Love"
13. "Send Me an Angel" (VideoClip)
14. "Big City Nights"
15. "Rock You Like a Hurricane"
16. "Wind of Change" (VideoClip)

== Personnel ==
- Klaus Meine – lead and backing vocals
- Rudolf Schenker – rhythm and lead guitars, acoustic guitar, backing vocals
- Matthias Jabs – lead and rhythm guitars, acoustic guitar, voice-box
- Francis Buchholz – bass
- Herman Rarebell – drums
