= Face the Heat =

Studio album by Scorpions
- Released: 21 September 1993
- Recorded: 1993
- Studios: Little Mountain Sound Studios, Vancouver, British Columbia, Canada
- Genres: Hard rock; heavy metal
- Length: 52:04
- Label: Mercury
- Producers: Bruce Fairbairn; Scorpions

Scorpions chronology
Crazy World (1990)	Face the Heat (1993)	Pure Instinct (1996)

Singles from Face The Heat
- 1. "Alien Nation" Released: 1993; 2. "Woman" Released: 1993; 3. "Under the Same Sun" Released: November 1993; 4. "No Pain No Gain" Released: 1994

Professional ratings
Review scores
Source	Rating
AllMusic	2.5/5 stars
Collector's Guide to Heavy Metal	4/10
Metal Hammer (GER)	6/7
Rock Hard	8.0/10

Face the Heat is the twelfth studio album released by the German hard rock band Scorpions in 1993.

It was produced by the band and the late Bruce Fairbairn and released on the Mercury label. This album marked their status as a sort of political band with the song "Alien Nation", which was about the re-unification of Germany. This album had a contemporary touch to it, as the band were then going with the current trends, before later returning to their original style in Unbreakable in 2004. This is the last album to feature drummer Herman Rarebell, and the first with Ralph Rieckermann on bass guitar replacing Francis Buchholz. It is also the band's final studio album to be released on Mercury.

"Under the Same Sun" was played during the ending credits of the 1994 film On Deadly Ground.

"Alien Nation" was covered by the Italian heavy metal band Mastercastle, recorded by Pier Gonella at MusicArt Studios and released as Japanese bonus track of their album The Phoenix.

"No Pain, No Gain" was one of the songs of the 1994 FIFA World Cup.

"Lonely Nights" was later included in the 2017 compilation album Born to Touch Your Feelings: Best of Rock Ballads.

== Track listing ==
All tracks are written by Rudolf Schenker and Klaus Meine except where noted

No.	Title	Writer(s)	Length
1.	"Alien Nation"		5:44
2.	"No Pain No Gain"	Schenker, Meine, Mark Hudson	3:55
3.	"Someone to Touch"	Schenker, Meine, Hudson	4:28
4.	"Under the Same Sun"	Hudson, Meine, Scott Fairbairn	4:52
5.	"Unholy Alliance"		5:16
6.	"Woman"		5:56
7.	"Hate to Be Nice"		3:30
8.	"Taxman Woman"		4:30
9.	"Ship of Fools"		4:15
10.	"Nightmare Avenue"	Matthias Jabs, Meine, Hudson	3:54
11.	"Lonely Nights"		4:50

Japanese edition bonus tracks
No.	Title	Length
12.	"Kami O Shin Jiru [sic]"	3:49
13.	"Daddy's Girl"	4:18

European edition bonus tracks
No.	Title	Length
12.	"Destin"	3:17
13.	"Daddy's Girl"	4:18

US edition hidden track
No.	Title	Writer(s)	Length
12.	"(Marie's the Name) His Latest Flame" (Elvis Presley cover)	Doc Pomus, Mort Shuman	2:27

Face the Heat single-only tracks
No.	Title	Writer(s)	Length
1.	"Rubber Fucker" (from the "Alien Nation" maxi-single)	Herman Rarebell	3:39
2.	"Partners in Crime" (from the "Under the Same Sun" maxi-single)		4:24

== Personnel ==
Scorpions

- Klaus Meine – lead vocals, backing vocals, arrangements on "Woman"
- Rudolf Schenker – rhythm guitar, lead guitar, sitar, EBow, backing vocals
- Matthias Jabs – lead guitar, rhythm guitar, talk box
- Herman Rarebell – drums, percussion
- Ralph Rieckermann – bass

Additional musicians

- John Webster – keyboards
- Luke Herzog – additional keyboards on "Woman" and "Lonely Nights", arrangements on "Woman"
- Helen Donath – opera voice on "Ship of Fools"
- Rhian Gittins – girl's voice on "Nightmare Avenue"
- Paul Laine, Mark LaFrance – backing vocals
- Bruce Fairbairn, Mark Hudson – backing vocals on "Under the Same Sun"

Production

- Bruce Fairbairn – producer, arrangements with Scorpions
- Erwin Musper – engineer, mixing at Wisseloord Studios, Hilversum, Netherlands
- Mike Plotnikoff – engineer
- George Marino – mastering at Sterling Sound, New York
- Hubert Kretzschmar – cover photography

== Charts ==
Chart (1993)	Peak position
Austrian Albums (Ö3 Austria)	12
Canada Top Albums/CDs (RPM)	34
Dutch Albums (Album Top 100)	34
Finnish Albums (The Official Finnish Charts)	8
French Albums (SNEP)	5
German Albums (Offizielle Top 100)	4
Hungarian Albums (MAHASZ)	11
Italian Albums (Musica e Dischi)	22
Japanese Albums (Oricon)	29
Norwegian Albums (VG-lista)	4
Swedish Albums (Sverigetopplistan)	15
Swiss Albums (Schweizer Hitparade)	9
UK Albums (Official Charts)	51
US Billboard 200	24

== Certifications and sales ==
Region	Certification	Certified units/sales
France (SNEP)	Gold	100,000^{*}
Germany	—	350,000
Norway (IFPI Norway)	Gold	25,000^{*}
Switzerland (IFPI Switzerland)	Gold	25,000^{^}
United States	—	450,000
Summaries
Worldwide	—	1,500,000
^{*} Sales figures based on certification alone.^{^} Shipments figures based on certification alone.
