= Comeblack =

Compilation album of re-recordings and cover tracks by Scorpions
- Released: 4 November 2011
- Recorded: 2011
- Studios: Scorpio Sound Studio and Vocal Land Studio, Germany, Opal Studio, Portland, Oregon
- Genres: Hard rock; heavy metal
- Length: 54:11 (67:57 with bonus tracks)
- Labels: Sony/Columbia Seven One; RCA (Japan)
- Producers: Mikael Nord Andersson; Martin Hansen

Scorpions chronology
Sting in the Tail (2010)	Comeblack (2011)	Return to Forever (2015)

Professional ratings
Review scores
Source	Rating
AllMusic	3/5 stars
Blabbermouth.net	4.5/10 stars
Forces Parallèles	2/5 stars
Metal Forces	6/10
Metal Hammer (GER)	4/7

Comeblack is a compilation of songs recorded by German hard rock band Scorpions; and is intended as a comeback album, following their farewell tour. Released after the successful 2010's Sting in the Tail, half of the album features re-recorded versions of their own classic songs and the other half cover versions of 1960s and early 1970s popular rock songs. It was announced on 3 October 2011, with a planned global release date of 4 November and a US release on 24 January 2012. Comeblack was also released for streaming online by AOL Music on 23 January 2012. The album was released by Sony Music Entertainment and available in both CD and vinyl formats.

During its first week on sale in the US, Comeblack sold about 5,000 copies, debuting at number 90 on the Billboard 200 chart.

A review of Comeblack by AllMusic rated the album three out of five stars, noting that the re-recorded songs sounded "bigger than their '80s counterparts," and saying that among the covers, "Children of the Revolution" and "Tainted Love" stood out.

== Track listing ==
No.	Title	Writer(s)	Original artist (date)	Length
1.	"Rhythm of Love" (from Savage Amusement, 1988)	Rudolf Schenker, Klaus Meine		3:39
2.	"No One Like You" (from Blackout, 1982)	Schenker, Meine		4:06
3.	"The Zoo" (from Animal Magnetism, 1980)	Schenker, Meine		5:38
4.	"Rock You Like a Hurricane" (from Love at First Sting, 1984)	Schenker, Meine, Herman Rarebell		4:15
5.	"Blackout" (from Blackout)	Schenker, Meine, Rarebell, Sonja Kittelsen		3:48
6.	"Wind of Change" (from Crazy World, 1990)	Meine		5:08
7.	"Still Loving You" (Rock Version) (from Love at First Sting)	Schenker, Meine		6:43
8.	"Tainted Love"	Ed Cobb	Gloria Jones (1965), Soft Cell (1981)	3:28
9.	"Children of the Revolution"	Marc Bolan	T. Rex (1972)	3:33
10.	"Across the Universe"	John Lennon, Paul McCartney	The Beatles (1969)	3:17
11.	"Tin Soldier"	Steve Marriott, Ronnie Lane	Small Faces (1967)	3:15
12.	"All Day and All of the Night"	Ray Davies	The Kinks (1964)	3:16
13.	"Ruby Tuesday"	Mick Jagger, Keith Richards	The Rolling Stones (1967)	3:55

Japanese edition bonus tracks
No.	Title	Writer(s)	Original artist (date)	Length
14.	"Big City Nights" (from Love at First Sting)	Schenker, Meine		3:53
15.	"Still Loving You (Je t'aime encore) (feat. Amandine Bourgeois)" (from Love at First Sting)	Schenker, Meine		6:43
16.	"Shapes of Things"	Paul Samwell-Smith, Keith Relf, Jim McCarty	The Yardbirds (1966)	3:20

== Personnel ==
Scorpions

- Klaus Meine – lead vocals
- Rudolf Schenker – rhythm guitars, lead guitars on tracks 6, 7, 14, 15, backing vocals
- Matthias Jabs – lead guitars, rhythm guitars on tracks 6, 7, 14, 15, acoustic guitars, backing vocals
- Paweł Mąciwoda – bass, backing vocals
- James Kottak – drums, backing vocals

Additional musicians

- Amandine Bourgeois - vocals on "Je t'aime encore"
- Peter Kirkman - radio voice, backing vocals
- Göran Elmquist - sound designer on "The Zoo"

Production

- Mikael Nord Andersson, Martin Hansen - producers, engineers, mixing, backing vocals
- Ryan Smith - mastering at Sterling Sound, New York
- Dirk Illing - cover artwork

== Charts ==
Chart (2012–13)	Peak position
Austrian Albums (Ö3 Austria)	37
Belgian Albums (Ultratop Wallonia)	100
French Albums (SNEP)	22
German Albums (Offizielle Top 100)	25
Japanese Albums (Oricon)	104
Portuguese Albums (AFP)	20
Swiss Albums (Schweizer Hitparade)	33
US Billboard 200	90
US Top Hard Rock Albums (Billboard)	7
US Top Rock Albums (Billboard)	27
