= Raised on Rock (Scorpions song) =

Single by Scorpions

from the album Sting in the Tail
- Released: 2010
- Recorded: Scorpio Sound Studio, and Vocal Land Studio (Additional vocals), Germany; May – December 2009
- Genre: Hard rock
- Length: 4:00
- Label: Sony Music Germany; New Door/UME (US)
- Songwriter(s): Klaus Meine; Martin Hansen; Mikael Nord Andersson
- Producer(s): Mikael Nord Andersson; Martin Hansen

Scorpions singles chronology
"The Good Die Young" (2010)	"Raised on Rock" (2010)

"Raised on Rock" is the second single from the seventeenth studio album "Sting in the Tail" of the German rock band Scorpions. The song achieved a great placement on the charts worldwide and became known as one of the greatest hits in the 2010s which is #2 on the Classic Rock Mediabase chart.

== Track listing ==
1. Raised on Rock

== Personnel ==
Scorpions

- Klaus Meine - lead vocals
- Matthias Jabs - lead guitar
- Rudolf Schenker - rhythm guitar
- Paweł Mąciwoda - bass guitar
- James Kottak - drums
