= Live at Wacken Open Air 2006 =

Video by Scorpions
- Released: 12 February 2008
- Recorded: 3 August 2006
- Venue: Wacken Open Air (Wacken)
- Genre: Heavy metal, hard rock
- Length: 139:06
- Label: RCA/Sony BMG
- Director: Guido Weiss
- Producer: Ronald Matthes, Rainer Margreiter

Scorpions video albums chronology
Unbreakable World Tour 2004 (2005)	Live at Wacken Open Air 2006 (2008)	Amazônia - Live in The Jungle (2009)

Live at Wacken Open Air 2006 (subtitled A Night to Remember - A Journey Through Time) is a live DVD released by the German heavy metal band Scorpions. It was supposed to be released on 18 December 2007 but was delayed till 12 February 2008 for reasons undisclosed to the public.

The set list was decided through a vote on the Scorpions official website, as explained by the band:

Wacken 2006 — this was a very special concert for us, exciting and challenging and — most important of all — a family reunion. We wanted our fans to participate, so in summer 2006 we put a set of 50 songs on our homepage for the community to vote. Many of the songs chosen we had on our setlist anyway, but there were also many surprises. Together with Michael Schenker, Uli Jon Roth and Herman Rarebell this show at Wacken gave us a great platform to journey through time — 35 years of SCORPIONS History

— Scorpions

== Track listing ==
1. "Coming Home"
2. "Bad Boys Running Wild"
3. "The Zoo"
4. "Loving You Sunday Morning"
5. "Make It Real"
6. "Pictured Life"
7. "Speedy's Coming"
8. "We'll Burn the Sky"
9. "Love 'Em or Leave 'Em"
10. "Don't Believe Her"
11. "Tease Me Please Me"
12. "Coast to Coast"
13. "Holiday"
14. "Lovedrive"
15. "Another Piece of Meat"
16. "Kottak Attack"
17. "Blackout"
18. "No One Like You"
19. "Six String Sting"
20. "Big City Nights"
21. "Can't Get Enough"
22. "Still Loving You"
23. "In Trance"
24. "Bolero"
25. "Ready to Sting" (Appearance of the Scorpion)
26. "Rock You Like a Hurricane"

== Omitted Songs ==
- "Dark Lady"
- "He's a Woman - She's a Man"
- "In Search of the Peace of Mind"
- "Dynamite"

== Personnel ==
Band members

- Klaus Meine – lead vocals
- Rudolf Schenker – guitars, backing vocals
- Matthias Jabs – guitars, backing vocals
- Paweł Mąciwoda – bass, backing vocals
- James Kottak – drums, backing vocals

Special guests

- Uli Jon Roth – guitar on tracks 6, 7, 8, 23, 24 + "He's a Woman – She's a Man", "Dark Lady"
- Michael Schenker – guitar on tracks 12, 13, 14, 15, 23, 24 + "In Search of the Peace of Mind"
- Herman Rarebell – drums on tracks 17, 18, 24 + "Dynamite", "In Search of the Peace of Mind"
- Tyson Schenker (Michael Schenker's son) – guitar on track 24
