= Moment of Glory =

2000 studio album by Scorpions

Studio album of re-recordings and cover tracks by Scorpions & Berlin Philharmonic
- Released: 8 August 2000
- Recorded: January, March and April 2000
- Studio: Tonstudio Robert Hafner and MG-Sound-Studios, Vienna, Austria
- Genre: Hard rock; heavy metal; symphonic metal
- Length: 61:14
- Label: EMI Classics
- Producer: Scorpions; Christian Kolonovits

Scorpions chronology
Eye II Eye (1999)	Moment of Glory (2000)	Unbreakable (2004)

Singles from Moment of Glory
- 1. "Moment of Glory" Released: 2000; 2. "Hurricane 2000" Released: 2000; 3. "Here in My Heart" Released: 2000

Moment of Glory Live

Video by Scorpions & Berlin Philharmonic
- Released: 5 December 2000
- Recorded: 22 June 2000
- Venue: EXPO 2000 (Hannover, Germany)
- Genre: Heavy metal, hard rock, symphonic metal
- Length: 110 min.
- Label: TDK / Eagle Vision
- Director: Pit Weyrich
- Producer: Jorg Hitzemann

Scorpions video albums chronology
Crazy World Tour Live... Berlin 1991 (1991)	Moment of Glory Live (2000)	Acoustica (2001)

Professional ratings
Review scores
Source	Rating
AllMusic	2.5/5 stars
AllMusic	(DVD)

Moment of Glory is an album by German hard rock band Scorpions. It was recorded in collaboration with the Berlin Philharmonic Orchestra and released in 2000. The album features re-arranged songs from the Scorpions repertoire, as well as classical interludes, a cover song and the new single "Moment of Glory". Initially, English composer Andrew Powell was asked to provide arrangements and Michael Kamen was designated next for the orchestral material. After the latter gave up the job in order to work with Metallica for their album S&M, finally the Austrian arranger and conductor Christian Kolonovits proved to be the right collaborator.

== Live performances ==
The Moment of Glory concert programme was first presented at the Hannover EXPO in June 2000, with Christian Kolonovits conducting the Berlin Philharmonic. The live performance was filmed to be released in VHS and Video CD in December 2000. In 2001, this rock-symphonic show was taken on a seven-city tour to Russia and the Baltic countries. Christian Kolonovits and Scott Lawton alternated as orchestra conductors.

== Track notes ==
"Hurricane 2000", the reworking of "Rock You Like a Hurricane", was the official theme song to Sabres Hockey Network broadcasts.

The title track "Moment of Glory" was the official anthem of the EXPO 2000 in Hannover, Germany.

The instrumental "Deadly Sting Suite" is based on two earlier Scorpions tracks, "He's a Woman, She's a Man" and "Dynamite".

The fifth track "Crossfire" repeats the main theme of the Russian song "Moscow Nights".

"Here in My Heart", written by Diane Warren, was recorded by Tiffany 10 years earlier for her album New Inside.

The 5.1 surround mix on the SACD release includes an orchestra-only version of "Wind of Change" as a ghost track, which follows after approximately one minute of silence at the end of "Lady Starlight".

== Track listings ==
=== Album ===
No.	Title	Writer(s)	Length
1.	"Hurricane 2000"	Rudolf Schenker, Klaus Meine, Herman Rarebell	6:04
2.	"Moment of Glory"	Meine	5:08
3.	"Send Me an Angel"	Schenker, Meine	6:19
4.	"Wind of Change"	Meine	7:36
5.	"Crossfire: Prologue (Midnight in Moscow) / Crossfire" (instrumental)	Vasily Solovyov-Sedoi / Schenker, Meine	6:47
6.	"Deadly Sting Suite: He's a Woman, She's a Man / Dynamite" (instrumental)	Schenker, Meine, Rarebell	7:22
7.	"Here in My Heart"	Diane Warren	4:20
8.	"Still Loving You"	Schenker, Meine	7:28
9.	"Big City Nights"	Schenker, Meine	4:37
10.	"Lady Starlight (13:59 on the 5.1 surround mix of the SACD release)"	Schenker, Meine	5:32

Bonus track
No.	Title	Writer(s)	Length
11.	"Hurricane 2000 (Radio Edit)"	Schenker, Meine, Rarebell	4:41

=== Video ===
No.	Title	Writer(s)	Length
1.	"Hurricane 2000"	Schenker, Meine, Rarebell	6:34
2.	"Moment of Glory"	Meine	8:00
3.	"You and I"	Meine	6:01
4.	"We Don't Own the World"	Schenker, Meine	9:54
5.	"Here in My Heart"	Warren	5:44
6.	"We'll Burn the Sky"	Schenker, Monika Dannemann	6:47
7.	"Big City Nights"	Schenker, Meine	5:21
8.	"Deadly Sting Suite: Crossfire / He's a Woman, She's a Man / Dynamite" (instrumental)	Schenker, Meine, Rarebell	15:49
9.	"Wind of Change"	Meine	9:41
10.	"Still Loving You"	Schenker, Meine	8:50
11.	"Moment of Glory (Encore)"	Meine	7:16
12.	"Hurricane 2000" (music video)
13.	"Moment of Glory" (music video)
14.	"Here in My Heart" (music video)
15.	"Interviews"

== Personnel ==
=== Scorpions ===
- Klaus Meine – vocals
- Rudolf Schenker – rhythm guitar, backing vocals
- Matthias Jabs – lead guitar, backing vocals
- Ralph Rieckermann – bass, backing vocals (on video version only)
- James Kottak – drums, backing vocals

with

- The Berlin Philharmonic Orchestra

=== Guest musicians on CD ===
- Lyn Liechty – vocals on "Here in My Heart"
- Ray Wilson – vocals on "Big City Nights"
- Zucchero – vocals on "Send Me an Angel"
- Guenther Becker – sitar on "Lady Starlight"
- Ken Taylor – bass
- Stefan Schrupp – drum and computer programming
- Gumpoldtskirchener Spatzen, Vienna – children's choir on "Moment of Glory"
- Vince Pirillo, Kai Petersen, Michael Perfler – choir on "Moment of Glory"
- Susie Webb, Zoë Nicholas, Rita Campbell, Melanie Marshall – backing vocals

=== Guest musicians on VHS ===
- Lyn Liechty – vocals on "Here in My Heart"
- Ray Wilson – vocals on "Big City Nights"

=== CD production ===
- Christian Kolonovits – producer, arrangements, conductor
- Hartmut Pfannmüller – engineer, mixing
- Joerg Steinfad, Martin Boehm, Rory Kushnen, Gert Jacobs, Mirko Bezzi – engineers
- Ian Cooper – mastering

== Charts ==
=== Weekly charts ===
Chart (2000)	Peak position
French Albums (SNEP)	70
German Albums (Offizielle Top 100)	3
Japanese Albums (Oricon)	100
Portuguese Albums (AFP)	1
Swiss Albums (Schweizer Hitparade)	48

=== Year-end charts ===
Chart (2000)	Position
German Albums (Offizielle Top 100)	63
South Korean International Albums (MIAK)	40

== Sales and certifications ==
Region	Certification	Certified units/sales
Canada (Music Canada) video	Gold	5,000^{^}
Germany (BVMI)	Gold	150,000^{^}
Greece (IFPI Greece)	Gold	15,000^{^}
Portugal (AFP)	Platinum	40,000^{^}
South Korea	—	51,206
^{^} Shipments figures based on certification alone.
