= Eye II Eye =

Studio album by Scorpions
- Released: 9 March 1999
- Recorded: 1998–1999
- Studios: Little America Studios, Austria
- Genres: Hard rock; pop rock; alternative rock
- Length: 62:49
- Labels: East West (Europe); Koch (US); WEA Japan (Japan)
- Producer: Peter Wolf

Scorpions chronology
Pure Instinct (1996)	Eye II Eye (1999)	Moment of Glory (2000)

Singles from Eye II Eye
- 1. "To Be No. 1" Released: 1999; 2. "Mysterious" Released: 1999; 3. "10 Light Years Away / Start Me Up" Released: 1999; 4. "Eye to Eye" Released: 1999; 5. "Aleyah" Released: 1999

Professional ratings
Review scores
Source	Rating
AllMusic	2/5 stars
Collector's Guide to Heavy Metal	2/10
Metal Hammer (GER)	6/7
Rock Hard	3.5/10

Eye II Eye is the fourteenth studio album by the German hard rock band Scorpions, released in 1999. It is a radical departure in that Eye II Eye is much more pop-oriented than their previous work, which alienated many fans, despite the single "Mysterious" reaching number 26 on the Billboard Hot Mainstream Rock Tracks chart. It is the first studio Scorpions album to feature James Kottak on drums and also the final Scorpions studio album to feature Ralph Rieckermann on bass guitar.

For the first (and, thus far, only) time, Scorpions released a song recorded largely in German, namely "Du bist so schmutzig" ("You are so dirty"), with few English lyrics by Kottak.

== Track listing ==
All lyrics are written by Klaus Meine, except where noted.

No.	Title	Music	Length
1.	"Mysterious"	Ralph Rieckermann, Rudolf Schenker, Matthias Jabs, Jean-Michel Byron	5:28
2.	"To Be No. 1"	Peter Wolf, Jabs	3:57
3.	"Obsession"	Meine, Wolf	4:09
4.	"10 Light Years Away" (Lyrics: Mick Jones, Marti Frederiksen, Meine, Schenker)	Jones, Frederiksen, Meine, Schenker	3:52
5.	"Mind Like a Tree"	Schenker, Wolf	5:34
6.	"Eye to Eye" (In memoriam of Hugo Meine and Heinrich Schenker, Klaus and Rudolf's fathers)	Schenker	5:04
7.	"What U Give U Get Back" (Lyrics: Meine, Schenker)	Schenker, Wolf	5:02
8.	"Skywriter"	Schenker	4:55
9.	"Yellow Butterfly"	Schenker, Frederiksen	5:44
10.	"Freshly Squeezed"	Schenker, Wolf	3:58
11.	"Priscilla"	Schenker	3:17
12.	"Du bist so schmutzig" (Lyrics: Meine, Jabs, James Kottak)	Jabs, Schenker	3:55
13.	"Aleyah" (Lyrics: Meine, Schenker)	Schenker	4:19
14.	"A Moment in a Million Years"	Meine	3:38

Japanese edition bonus track
No.	Title	Music	Length
15.	"You and I (“Butcher”-radio-remix)"	Meine	4:00

Eye II Eye single-only track
No.	Title	Music	Length
1.	"Mind Power" (from the "To Be No.1" CD-single)	Meine	4:28

== Personnel ==
Scorpions

- Klaus Meine – lead vocals
- Rudolf Schenker – rhythm guitars, lead guitars, acoustic guitar, electric sitar, backing vocals
- Matthias Jabs – lead guitars, rhythm guitars, acoustic guitar, slide guitar, voice box, mandolin
- Ralph Rieckermann – bass, backing vocals
- James Kottak – drums, backing vocals, co-lead vocals on "Du bist so schmutzig"

Additional musicians

- Peter Wolf – keyboards and piano on "A Moment in a Million Years"
- Michelle Wolf – backing vocals on "Skywriter" and "What U Give U Get Back"
- Mick Jones – acoustic guitar on "10 Light Years Away"
- Airway Allstars: Siedah Garrett, Lynn Davis, James Ingram, Phil Perry and Kevin Dorsey – backing vocals on "What U Give U Get Back"
- Herman Rarebell – backing vocals on "Mind Like a Tree"

Production

- Peter Wolf – producer, mixing of tracks 5, 6 and 14, arrangements with Scorpions
- A.T., Christian Leitgeb, Paul Ericksen and Kenji Nakai – engineers
- Bill Schnee – mixing
- Chris Kimsey – mixing on track 2
- Stephen Marcussen, Chris von Rautenkranz – mastering

== Charts ==
Chart (1999)	Peak position
Finnish Albums (Suomen virallinen lista)	37
French Albums (SNEP)	50
German Albums (Offizielle Top 100)	6
Hungarian Albums (MAHASZ)	24
Japanese Albums (Oricon)	84
Swiss Albums (Schweizer Hitparade)	49
UK Rock & Metal Albums (Official Charts)	23

== Sales and certifications ==
Region	Certification	Certified units/sales
Malaysia	Platinum	25,000
Singapore	—	3,000
South Korea	—	11,515
