= Still Loving You =

Single by Scorpions

from the album Love at First Sting
- B-side: "Holiday"
- Released: June 1984 (US)
- Recorded: 1983
- Genre: Glam metal; hard rock; soft rock
- Length: 6:26 (album version); 4:48 (single edit)
- Label: Harvest; EMI
- Composer: Rudolf Schenker
- Lyricist: Klaus Meine
- Producer: Dieter Dierks

Scorpions singles chronology
"Rock You Like a Hurricane" (1984)	"Still Loving You" (1984)	"Big City Nights" (1984)

Music video
- "Scorpions - Still Loving You (Official Video)" on YouTube

"Still Loving You" is a song by the German hard rock band Scorpions. A power ballad, it was released in June 1984 as the second single from their ninth studio album, Love at First Sting. The song reached number 64 on the Billboard Hot 100. It was most successful in Europe, reaching the top 5 in several countries.

== Background ==
Rudolf Schenker already composed parts of the melody around 1976, but the lead guitarist at the time, Uli Jon Roth, rejected the song as too commercial. It was not until 1983 that the composition was completed and singer Klaus Meine added the lyrics. In an interview with Songfacts, Schenker explained: "It's a story about a love affair, where they recognized it may be over - but let's try again".

== Music video ==
The music video was released on 3 July 1984, and was filmed in Dallas, Texas, at Reunion Arena.

== In the media ==
The song can be heard in the police procedural television series Cold Case, in the episode "It's Raining Men" (2004). "Still Loving You" is also featured in the television show Patinando por un sueño and Polish comedy film Gotowi na wszystko. Exterminator (2018).

== Track listing ==
=== Original version (1984) ===
Single (Harvest 20 0329 7)

1. "Still Loving You" - 4:48
2. "Holiday" - 6:31 (taken from the album Lovedrive)

=== Remix (1992) ===
CD single (Harvest 1 C 560-204675-2)

1. "Still Loving You" (Remix) – 6:12
2. "Still Loving You" (Radio edit) – 3:58
3. "Media Overkill" – 3:34 (taken from the album Savage Amusement)

== Personnel ==
- Klaus Meine – vocals
- Rudolf Schenker – lead and rhythm guitars
- Matthias Jabs – lead and rhythm guitars
- Francis Buchholz – bass
- Herman Rarebell – drums

== Charts ==
=== Weekly charts ===
Chart (1984–1987)	Peak position
Argentina (CAPIF)	4
Belgium (Ultratop 50 Flanders)	3
France (SNEP)	3
Netherlands (Dutch Top 40)	4
Netherlands (Single Top 100)	5
Switzerland (Schweizer Hitparade)	3
US Billboard Hot 100	64
US Mainstream Rock Airplay (Billboard)	36
West Germany (GfK)	14

Chart (1992)	Peak position
Germany (GfK)	87

=== Year-end charts ===
Chart (1985)	Position
Switzerland (Schweizer Hitparade)	17

Chart (1987)	Position
Belgium (Ultratop Flanders)	40
Netherlands (Dutch Top 40)	24
Netherlands (Single Top 100)	20

Chart (2012)	Position
France (SNEP)	188

== Certifications ==
Region	Certification	Certified units/sales
France (SNEP)	Platinum	1,000,000^{*}
Italy (FIMI) Since 2009	Gold	35,000^{‡}
Spain (Promusicae)	Platinum	60,000^{‡}
^{*} Sales figures based on certification alone.^{‡} Sales+streaming figures based on certification alone.

== Other versions ==
- A remixed version of the studio album version was included on Scorpions' 1992 album Still Loving You. The remixed version was also released as a single in Germany and some other European countries.
- A symphonic metal version of the song, featuring the Berlin Philharmonic Orchestra, was recorded for Scorpions' 2000 album Moment of Glory.
- An unplugged version was recorded for Scorpions' 2001 album Acoustica.
- A "sequel" of the song was recorded for Scorpions' 2010 album Sting in the Tail, entitled "SLY", an acronym for "Still Loving You".
- Two versions of the song were recorded for Scorpions' 2011 album Comeblack: a regular version and a Frenglish version featuring Amandine Bourgeois.
- In 2023, American singer Anastacia recorded a version of "Still Loving You" for her album Our Songs.
