= Humanity: Hour I =

Studio album by Scorpions
- Released: 14 May 2007
- Recorded: October 2006 – February 2007
- Studio: Little Big Guy Studios, Gentlemen's Club, Glenwood Place Studios, Track Record Studios, The Village and Record Plant, Los Angeles, California
- Genre: Hard rock; heavy metal
- Length: 48:59
- Label: RCA/Sony BMG; New Door/UME (North America)
- Producer: James Michael; Desmond Child

Scorpions chronology
Unbreakable (2004)	Humanity: Hour I (2007)	Sting in the Tail (2010)

Singles from Humanity: Hour I
- 1. "Humanity" Released: 2007; 2. "The Game of Life" Released: 2007; 3. "Love Will Keep Us Alive" Released: 2007

Humanity: Hour I is the sixteenth studio album by German hard rock band Scorpions, which was released in Europe on 14 May 2007 and in the United States and Canada on 28 August 2007. Humanity: Hour I is a concept album based on a loose storyline by Desmond Child and futurist Liam Carl, which predicts a world torn apart by a civil war between humans and robots. This apocalyptic nightmare serves as a warning shot to all people, whose only hope of survival is to reclaim our humanity.

The album was produced by James Michael and Desmond Child, who also provide backing vocals. The song "Humanity" was performed for the first time by Scorpions on 24 March 2007 in Brussels, Belgium and released as the first single from the album.

Also of note is the band's logo on the album's cover: the text font is similar to their first two albums, as opposed to the band's more famous logo. This marks only the third time in the band's career (and the first time in 33 years) the less familiar font has been used. However, their more familiar logo can be seen on the back of the neck of the gynoid.

The opening track "Hour I" was used as the intro of the NHL's Minnesota Wild from 2007 to 2015.

== Background and recording ==
After Scorpions had finished the UK tour as a special guest for Judas Priest, Rudolf Schenker revealed that the band had started working on a live video album which would later become Unbreakable World Tour 2004: One Night in Vienna and also revealed that the band was planning to start working on a new album in late 2005. In an interview for the Malay Mail in May 2006, Schenker confirmed that the band was working on a new album which would have been hopefully released in late 2006 or early 2007. Describing the upcoming album, Schenker said: "For now, I can only tell you that it's going to pick up where Unbreakable left off. It will have superb power ballads and hard-rocking songs playable on commercial radio. I guess you can say that the new Scorpions album is going to sound fresh and rocking. Also one more thing, it's going to be a great album and not an album with one or two great songs". Originally, the band had in mind to choose Dieter Dierks as album producer, but it did not work out because of a disagreement on the contract. After the planned collaboration with Dierks did not happen, Scorpions had in mind to produce album by themselves at Rudolf Schenker's Scorpio Sound Studio, but were afraid that their efforts might not be good enough. Schenker said: "We knew we wanted to make a special record. We wanted to make sure that this album was going to be a masterpiece. When we do an album these days it has to be something special. If we only did it to make the fans happy – that's one thing – but you also have to make yourself happy."

Scorpions had been working intensively on the songs during the concerts in 2006 and invited several producers to come over to Germany for an interview (one of them was Roy Thomas Baker), but band members weren't really pleased with what producers had to offer, so in the end band decided to choose Desmond Child and James Michael as the producers of the new album. James Michael worked on the production of guitars, drums and bass. In October 2006, Scorpions band members went to Los Angeles to start recording the new material and during the next month and a half they worked on recording the basic tracks for the album. The band arrived there with 30 songs already written and soon after they began a second songwriting process. In the end of the second songwriting process, band had around 20 songs and many of those songs had a tone "too dark" from the lyrical standpoint, so band choose to eliminate many of the "darker" songs from the album and put in more optimistic songs. Among those songs are "The Game of Life" and "You're Lovin' Me to Death". In order to make those songs fit the concept of the album, songwriting teams had to rewrite the lyrics and the choruses on those songs. During the first couple of weeks, the band was working together in a rehearsal space, every day for eight hours. After the rehearsals, they started to arrange and record in different studios in the Los Angeles area. Guitars were recorded in one studio with James Michael, while Klaus Meine's vocals were recorded with Desmond in another studio. Child also hired a vocal coach for Meine, to perform about an hour of vocal warm-up before the recording sessions. Matthias Jabs explained: "Vocal cords are like muscles and you need to warm them up. Desmond was a visionary guy and knew if the vocalist is in good form, then he'll get what he wants from them". In the period between October 2006 and February 2007, band managed to record thirteen songs, of which twelve managed to make the album. Among the remaining 37 songs, several were recorded only as a demos.

Among those 37 songs one was co-written by Meine with Michael Nord Andersson and Martin Hansen. Child liked that song, but he did not like the lyrics, so he and Meine rewrote the lyrical part and the song became "The Game of Life".

After recording process was completed, the band immediately started the promotional tour. Since the album in that period was not mixed yet, the band had to collaborate with Desmond Child over the Internet in the mixing process. To do that, they had to download the whole album, get appropriate speaker system and later send comments to Child via Internet.

== Lyrical themes and composition ==
Humanity: Hour I is a concept album based on a loose storyline by Desmond Child and futurist Liam Carl, which predicts a world torn apart by a civil war between humans and robots. It's a concept album where songs are connected under the global theme of humanity.

Speaking of the album sound, frontman Klaus Meine said: "We wanted to make an album that was up to date, with a more modern sound to it without losing the Scorpion signature and I think it's still there. A lot of people feel it's a very good connection between the typical Scorpions sound but in a new way. It wasn't so much that we were trying to experiment; we still wanted a Scorpions record but not so much a classic rock album like going back to the old days, the 80's. We really wanted a record that would sound like 2007". Guitars on songs on this album are in drop D, drop C and drop C sharp tunings and those tunings were chosen depending on the Meine's vocal ranges on the songs. Matthias Jabs explained: "Sometimes if you play the guitar riff dropped to a D, it will not only sound different but play different. But whatever was the best for the vocals is how we proceeded. It is no point in recording something if it is too stressful for the singer to sing properly".

== Release and artwork ==
The album title and artwork were first released through the official French Scorpions fan club Crazyscorps in February 2007. The album artwork is featuring a human robot with the Scorpions logo on the back of its neck. However, after nearly two months since the fan club released the artwork on its website, they received information from the webmaster of the official Scorpions website about the illegal leak of that material and that the band disclaimed Crazyscorps for posting the artwork without authorization. The fan club website was closed soon after.

The album was released in May 2007 in Europe and in August 2007 in North America. Delay of the album release in North America happened because the band had changed their US management and also because Desmond Child was afraid of the album leaking on the Internet.

== Reception ==
Professional ratings
Review scores
Source	Rating
411mania.com	7.5/10
About.com	4/5 stars
AllMusic	3.5/5 stars
Daily Vault	C−
Blabbermouth.net	7.5/10
Forces Parallèles	4/5 stars
Metal Storm	8.3/10
Metal Temple	8/10 stars
PopMatters	4/10 stars
RockReport.be	5.5/6 stars

Humanity: Hour I generally received very good reviews. Dan Marsicano from 411mania.com wrote that the "album really shows the band on fire and as powerful as they were 35 years ago". Chad Bowar from About.com stated that "Humanity Hour 1 proves that even though Scorpions have been around for a long time, their creative juices, excellent songwriting and musicianship are fully intact". Thom Jurek from AllMusic wrote that the album "deserved an American issue, since radio needs the Scorpions more than the Scorpions need radio at this point". For Don Kaye of Blabbermouth.net "it's quite easy to say that Humanity – Hour 1 is probably the best Scorpions album since 1990's Crazy World and that "Scorpions recovered their sting". The Metal Storm review remarks how Humanity – Hour 1 "has a distinct sound that sets it aside from the rest. Hard-rock yes, but with a slightly different radio vibe that might not please the die-hard fans". Grigoris Chronis from Metal Temple concluded his review saying that Scorpions "have still enough to say and to give to the world of music". RockReport review added that "this is the first album that bridges the old and the new Scorpions the way it should have been done, thanks to Desmond Child who showed the band the right direction".

The album also received some negative critics. Ben McViker from Daily Vault rated album with C− stating that "it sounds more like an album written by two architects of latter-day Aerosmith, with the Scorpions performing the music". Andrew Blackie of PopMatters also rated the album poorly and stated that "if Humanity is an unremarkable album in itself, complete with a frankly laughable social slant, the band sound more confident stuck to their hammy hard-rock than anywhere else".

== Track listing ==
No.	Title	Writer(s)	Length
1.	"Hour I"	Rudolf Schenker, James Michael, Desmond Child, John Lowery	3:26
2.	"The Game of Life"	Klaus Meine, Child, Mikael Nord Andersson, Martin Hansen	4:04
3.	"We Were Born to Fly"	Matthias Jabs, Eric Bazilian, Marti Frederiksen	3:59
4.	"The Future Never Dies"	Meine, Child, Bazilian, Jason Paige, Russ Irwin	4:03
5.	"You're Lovin' Me to Death"	Schenker, Child, Andreas Carlsson, Bazilian	3:15
6.	"321"	Schenker, Child, Frederiksen, Paige	3:53
7.	"Love Will Keep Us Alive"	Meine, Child, Bazilian, Frederiksen	4:32
8.	"We Will Rise Again"	Jabs, Michael, Paige, Child	3:49
9.	"Your Last Song"	Schenker, Child, Bazilian	3:44
10.	"Love Is War"	Jabs, Michael, Child, Frederiksen	4:20
11.	"The Cross"	Jabs, Michael, Child, Frederiksen	4:28
12.	"Humanity"	Meine, Child, Bazilian	5:26

Bonus tracks available on Limited Edition, LP, and Japan releases
No.	Title	Writer(s)	Length
13.	"Cold"	Jabs, Child, Bazilian, Frederiksen	3:52
14.	"Humanity" (Radio Edit) (Not on the Japan CD)	Meine, Child, Bazilian	4:06
15.	"Love Will Keep Us Alive" (Radio Edit)	Meine, Child, Bazilian, Frederiksen	3:16

== Personnel ==
Scorpions

- Klaus Meine – lead vocals
- Rudolf Schenker – rhythm guitar, backing vocals
- Matthias Jabs – lead guitar, backing vocals
- Paweł Mąciwoda – bass, backing vocals
- James Kottak – drums, backing vocals

Additional musicians

- Billy Corgan – vocals on "The Cross"
- Eric Bazilian – guitar on "Love Will Keep Us Alive"
- John 5 – guitar on "Hour I"
- Russ Irwin – piano on "The Future Never Dies"
- Harry Sommerdahl – programming on "Love Will Keep Us Alive"
- Jason Paige, Jeanette Olsson – backing vocals
- Angela Whittaker, Roman Shaw Child – voice-overs
- David Campbell – orchestra conductor

Production

- Desmond Child – producer, executive producer, art supervision, backing vocals
- James Michael – producer, engineer, backing vocals
- Jules Gondar, Matt Gruber, Steve Churchyard – engineers
- Greg Collins – mixing
- Stephen Marcussen – mastering

== Charts ==
Chart (2007)	Peak position
Austrian Albums (Ö3 Austria)	41
Belgian Albums (Ultratop Wallonia)	79
Czech Albums (ČNS IFPI)	47
Dutch Albums (Album Top 100)	91
Finnish Albums (Suomen virallinen lista)	29
French Albums (SNEP)	16
German Albums (Offizielle Top 100)	9
Italian Albums (FIMI)	44
Japanese Albums (Oricon)	54
Mexican Albums (Top 100 Mexico)	94
Spanish Albums (Promusicae)	59
Swedish Albums (Sverigetopplistan)	36
Swiss Albums (Schweizer Hitparade)	27
UK Rock & Metal Albums (OCC)	20
US Billboard 200	63
US Top Rock Albums (Billboard)	17
US Top Hard Rock Albums (Billboard)	7

== Certifications ==
Region	Certification	Certified units/sales
Russia (NFPF)	Platinum	20,000^{*}
^{*} Sales figures based on certification alone.

== Release history ==
Region	Date	Label	Format	Catalog
Europe	25 May 2007	Sony BMG	double LP	309146
