= Raised on Rock =

Raised on Rock may refer to:

- Raised on Rock / For Ol' Times Sake (issued also as simply Raised on Rock), a 1973 album by Elvis Presley
  - "Raised on Rock" (song), the title track
- Raised on Rock (Voodoo Circle album), 2018
- "Raised on Rock" (Scorpions song), 2010
