= Humanity (Scorpions song) =

2007 song by the band Scorpions

Single by Scorpions

from the album Humanity - Hour 1
- Released: 2007
- Recorded: 2007
- Length: 5:26
- Label: BMG
- Songwriter(s): Klaus Meine; Desmond Child; Eric Bazilian
- Producer(s): James Michael; Desmond Child

"Humanity" is a song by Scorpions. It is the first single from their album, Humanity - Hour 1. Scorpions performed their new single, on 24 March 2007 at a special concert to celebrate the 50th anniversary of signing the Roman treaty, which became the basis for foundation of the European Union.

Its main theme throughout is of the future downfall of human civilization as we know it.

It has received good reception and brief, along with high airplay on hard rock stations, but it has also been hampered by the Scorpions' reputation as a "classic rock" band.

The music video fits with the song's theme: the band is seen playing on a stage with a doomsday-like background, there are screens that show human suffering, like in the September 11 attacks.

In India, an alternative video was made, consisting of images shot by common people. The video was telecast on VH1 channel.
