= Sting in the Tail =

Studio album by Scorpions
- Released: 14 March 2010
- Recorded: May–December 2009
- Studio: Scorpio Sound Studio and Vocal Land Studio, Germany; The Garage Studio and Atlantisstudion, Stockholm, Sweden
- Genre: Hard rock; heavy metal
- Length: 47:20
- Label: Sony/Columbia Seven One (Europe); New Door/UME (North America); RCA (Japan)
- Producer: Mikael Nord Andersson; Martin Hansen

Scorpions chronology
Humanity: Hour I (2007)	Sting in the Tail (2010)	Return to Forever (2015)

Singles from Sting in the Tail
- 1. "The Good Die Young" Released: 26 February 2010; 2. "Raised on Rock" Released: 2010

Sting in the Tail is the seventeenth studio album by German hard rock band Scorpions. It was released on 19 March 2010 in Europe (14 March in Greece) and on 23 March in North America. At the time it was intended to be a farewell album, released prior to their farewell tour.

Band members explained that the sound of the album would have been similar to that of the classic releases of the 80s, but with a modern twist.

The album features a duet on the song "The Good Die Young" with the Finnish symphonic metal singer Tarja Turunen, best known as the former lead vocalist of Nightwish.

A tentative title for the album was Humanity: Hour II, however this was eventually scrapped.

First week sales in the United States were 18,500 copies sold placing the album at No. 23 on the Billboard 200 chart. In Germany the album debuted at No. 2, but fell in its second week to No. 3, in France at No. 16 and in Greece at No. 1. The album also peaked at Number 2 on the Billboard Rock Charts.

The Get Your Sting and Blackout World Tour promoting the album was initially reported to be the band's last tour, though this proved not to be the case. In later interviews given after the tour had started, at least two band members (Klaus Meine and Matthias Jabs) stated that the band was not going to stop touring and was in fact, working on new material.

== Background and recording ==
In early April 2009, Scorpions fan club ScorpNews.com announced that Scorpions would have entered the studio in the fall of the same year to record a new album. A couple of weeks later, Klaus Meine officially confirmed that the band was working on new material in an interview for Deutsche Welle. He explained that "after a very turbulent 2008 with 60 shows in 22 countries, we're now trying to breathe a bit and charge our batteries — but also to be creative". Two months later, the band had extended their record deal with Ariola Records.

The band prepared about 18 songs for the album and teamed up with Swedish producers Mikael Nord Andersson an Martin Hansen. All the songs from the album are new written material, except four songs: "Slave Me", "No Limit", "Turn You On", "Spirit of Rock" and "The Best Is Yet to Come" which were written during the recording sessions for Unbreakable. During those sessions "Turn You On" had a different title; "The Best Is Yet to Come" was planned to be recorded for the album following Unbreakable, but when the band received an offer from Desmond Child to record Humanity: Hour I they kept the song and recorded it for this album. James Kottak in the interview for Sleaze Roxx explained: "The first four songs that we wrote for this record were actually dark. I call them dark songs because they were probably too heavy compared to the stuff we've done in the past. They were in the vein of "The Good Die Young", but you can't have too many songs like that. I love "The Good Die Young" but I'm glad the way things evolved took us away from where we were headed initially in the songwriting process. We also co-wrote with our producers, Martin Hansen and Mikael Andersson, who took the whole thing to an entirely different level".

Recording process started in May 2009 and took place in four different recording studios. Main recording was done at Scorpio Sound Studio in Hannover, Germany. Vocals were done in The Garage Studios in Stockholm, while additional vocals were recorded in Vocal Land Studio. Drum parts were recorded at Atlantisstudion in Stockholm. By the mid-December 2009, the band had finished with the recording of the album. Just before Christmas, they invited people from the European record company people to a listening session. After they listened to the whole album the next day the management told the band that the record company loved it and that it was the best record in years. The management proposed the idea of this album being the last studio album and announcing a final tour. Matthias Jabs explained "We had never spent a second thinking about this. For us, subconsciously, we thought it would go on forever. We were taken back a bit, but after a couple days living with the thought we decided together – that would be the right thing to do. We want to go out on top while we are still healthy and can still do a high-energy show that’s two, sometimes three hours a night."

== Composition and lyrical content ==
Rudolf Schenker explained that with this album, Scorpions went back to their roots. He said "If you take the best song elements from the ‘80s albums, and put these on one album, you come up with the Sting in the Tail album. So in this case we tried to re-invent the Scorpions sound from the ‘80s, using the same DNA after putting in a modern twist, to make it sound like today’s music".

Lyrics on the album deal with various subjects. "Raised on Rock" is a song about Scorpions' philosophy of life. Meine explained "We all started listening the music and growing up with the music back in the 60s". Schenker also added ""Raised on Rock" is our soundtrack and it will be our soundtrack until the end of our days. It's the reason why we formed the band." Songs "Let's Rock", "Rock Zone" and "Spirit of Rock" deal with the same subject. "Sting in the Tail" is a song about attitude and as Schenker said "it is really a great symbol of what the Scorpions are all about". "The Good Die Young" is an anti-war song about soldiers in Afghanistan and all the people around the world who stand for freedom and peace. Meine explained "We all live in trouble times. I think that song is trying to express that kind of feeling". Lyrics for the song were inspired by the conversation between Meine and his friend who was preparing to go to Afghanistan for eight months. Meine said: "In between the lines I could hear, 'Well, let’s hope I come back home alive'." "Lorelei" is a song about the legend of the water-spirit Lorelei who lives on the top of the rock Loreley above the river Rhine. "SLY" is the fictional song about a girl named Sly. Meine explained "When "Still Loving You" was a smash hit back in the '80s, many folks made love to that song, obviously. Many people told us in Europe, especially France, 'We called our daughter Sly because of Still Loving You'"

== Release and promotion ==
The title for the album was announced on 22 November 2009 and the artwork was released on 8 January 2010. First snippets of the album were uploaded on Scorpions' official web site on 24 January 2010 and final snippets of the whole album were released on Amazon.de on 25 February 2010. The complete track list was revealed on 5 February 2010. Eight days later promotional video for the album was released on Blabbermouth.net The first international single released from the album was the song "The Good Die Young". It was premiered by the Greek online radio station Rockmachine.gr and a reduced radio broadcast quality version of the song was uploaded to YouTube by the domestic Scorpions' fan club Greek Sting Fan Club. The first single in the United States was "Raised on Rock". It was available for purchase via Amazon.com prior the release of the album. The song reached No. 1 one on the classic rock radio stations. On 21 June 2010, the band released the single from the album to the radio, with the title track "Sting in the Tail". In Greece the album was released exclusively with the Real News newspaper on 14 March 2010. The day before the release Greek Fan Club held a listening session for the album at Hard Rock Cafe in Athens. The album was released on 19 March 2010. in Europe and 23 March 2010 in the US. In the week of release in the US, iTunes gave customers the opportunity to preorder the album until 22 March with the special download of the exclusive bonus track called "Let's Rock!". From 20 April till 1 June 2010, the web magazine Classic Rock Revisited gave Scorpions' fans opportunity to win a copy of the album autographed by Meine, Schenker and Jabs by filling out the eForm for a random draw. On 2 November 2010. Sony Music Germany released a Premium Edition of the album, which consists of the CD and a bonus DVD. The CD has the standard 12 tracks plus five bonus tracks: "Dreamers", "Too Far", "Miracle", a new version of the song "The Good Die Young" which is a duet with Tarja Turunen and "Thunder and Lightning", which was previously released as a bonus track on a Japanese versions of the album. The bonus DVD has live videos of the performances of the song "Sting in the Tail" in San Antonio and the song "The Best Is Yet to Come" recorded in Prague. Bonus DVD also features EPK for the Sting in the Tail album.

== Reception ==
Professional ratings
Review scores
Source	Rating
About.com	4/5 stars
AllMusic	4/5 stars
Blabbermouth.net	8/10
Brave Words & Bloody Knuckles	6.0/10
Rock Hard	9.0/10

Sting in the Tail generally received positive reviews. Thom Jurek from AllMusic stated that "as a farewell, Sting in the Tail is an album the Scorpions and their fans can be proud of". Scott Alisoglu from Blabbermouth.net said that the album is a "very good representation of what makes the Scorpions a truly classic heavy metal band". Kevin Wierzbicki from antiMusic.com rated this album with three and a half stars commenting that "Sting in the Tail is pretty much a typical Scorpions effort filled with well-performed but ultimately forgettable rockers". Two reviewers gave the album almost full score. Tony Antunovich from Metaleater.com gave the album A− stating that "is a solid effort and focuses primarily on slightly toned-down Rock anthems performed in SCORPIONS style", while Aniruddh "Andrew" Bansal of Metal Assault nine and a half out of ten by saying that "If this really is the last album they would ever record, I would say with a heavy heart that it's the perfect way to say goodbye to the fans" Ruben Mosqueda from Sleaze Roxx gave a positive review to the album by saying that "Sting in the Tail is a near perfect album and one hell of a way to wind up a career". Former drummer Herman Rarebell said "I like the new album very much. I think that is the way people hear the Scorpions."

The album has sold 18,500 copies in the United States in its first week of release and debuted at position No. 23 on the Billboard 200 chart which is the band's highest chart debut in over 20 years. In Germany, the album received a platinum award for selling over 200,000 copies.

== Track listing ==
Sting in the Tail – International release
No.	Title	Lyrics	Music	Length
1.	"Raised on Rock"	Martin Hansen, Klaus Meine	Mikael Nord Andersson, Hansen	3:58
2.	"Sting in the Tail"	Meine	Meine, Rudolf Schenker	3:13
3.	"Slave Me"	Meine, Matthias Jabs, Eric Bazilian	Schenker	2:45
4.	"The Good Die Young" (featuring Tarja Turunen)	Meine	Schenker, Christian Kolonovits	5:14
5.	"No Limit"	Meine, Schenker, Bazilian	Meine, Schenker, Bazilian	3:23
6.	"Rock Zone"	Meine	Meine, Andersson, Hansen	3:18
7.	"Lorelei"	Meine, Bazilian, Fredrik Thomander, Anders Wikström	Schenker, Thomander, Wikström	4:33
8.	"Turn You On"	Meine	Schenker, Andersson, Hansen	4:23
9.	"Let's Rock!"	Meine, Bazilian	Meine, Schenker, Bazilian	3:20
10.	"SLY"	Meine	Meine, Schenker	5:17
11.	"Spirit of Rock"	Meine, Schenker, Bazilian	Schenker, Bazilian	3:43
12.	"The Best Is Yet to Come"	Schenker, Bazilian, Thomander, Wikström	Bazilian, Thomander, Wikström	4:33
Total length:				47:20

Japanese edition bonus track
No.	Title	Lyrics	Music	Length
13.	"Thunder and Lightning"	Meine	Schenker, Meine, Kolonovits	4:35
Total length:				52:11

Premium edition
No.	Title	Lyrics	Music	Length
13.	"Dreamers" (bonus track taken from Japanese edition of 2004 Unbreakable album)	Meine, Bazilian	Meine, Schenker, Bazilian	4:49
14.	"Too Far" (bonus track taken from Japanese edition of 2004 Unbreakable album)	Jabs, Meine	Jabs	3:07
15.	"Miracle" (bonus track taken from 2003 'Miracle' single)	Meine	Jabs, Thomas Nöhre	4:14
16.	"The Good Die Young" (bonus track, alt. version with co-lead vocals by Tarja Turunen; released also as B-side on Tarja's single 'Falling Awake')			5:16
17.	"Thunder and Lightning" (bonus track taken from Japanese edition)			4:33

DVD
No.	Title	Lyrics	Music	Length
1.	"Sting in the Tail" (Live video San Antonio)			8:48
2.	"The Best Is Yet to Come" (Live video in Prague)			4:37
3.	"Sting in the Tail (Video message – English)"; I. "Hour I"; II. "Holiday"; III. "Wind of Change"; IV. "The Good Die Young"; V. "Raised on Rock"; VI. "Lorelei"; VII. "Sting in the Tail"; VIII. "Rock You Like a Hurricane"	I. Schenker, James Michael, Desmond Child, John 5 II. Meine; III. Meine; IV. Meine; V. Hansen, Meine; VI. Meine, Bazilian, Thomander, Wikström; VII. Meine; VIII. Meine, Herman Rarebell	I. Schenker, Michael, Child, John 5 II. Schenker; III. Meine; IV. Schenker, Colonovits; V. Andersson, Hansen; VI. Schenker, Thomander, Wikström; VII. Meine, Schenker; VIII. Schenker	8:00

Vinyl LP edition – Side one
No.	Title	Length
1.	"Raised on Rock"	3:58
2.	"Sting in the Tail"	3:13
3.	"Slave Me"	2:45
4.	"The Good Die Young" (featuring Tarja Turunen)	5:14
5.	"No Limit"	3:23
6.	"Rock Zone"	3:18

Vinyl LP edition – Side two
No.	Title	Length
1.	"Lorelei"	4:33
2.	"Turn You On"	4:23
3.	"Let's Rock!"	3:20
4.	"SLY"	5:17
5.	"Spirit of Rock"	3:43
6.	"The Best Is Yet to Come"	4:33

== Personnel ==
Adapted from the album liner notes.

Scorpions

- Klaus Meine – lead vocals, backing vocals
- Rudolf Schenker – rhythm guitar, lead guitar, backing vocals
- Matthias Jabs – lead guitar, rhythm guitar, acoustic guitar, talk box
- Paweł Mąciwoda – bass
- James Kottak – drums, backing vocals

Additional personnel

- Tarja Turunen – guest vocals on "The Good Die Young"

Production

- Mikael Nord Andersson – production, recording, mixing, gang vocals
- Martin Hansen – production, recording, mixing
- Hans-Martin Buff – Pro Tools operating and engineering
- Peter Kirkman – guitar technician
- Ingo Powitzer – guitar technician
- Micke Svennsson – drum technician
- Mats Lindfors, George Marino – mastering
- Dirk Illing – cover artwork

== Charts ==
=== Weekly charts ===
Chart (2010)	Peak position
Austrian Albums (Ö3 Austria)	6
Belgian Albums (Ultratop Flanders)	83
Belgian Albums (Ultratop Wallonia)	45
Canadian Albums (Billboard)	22
Czech Albums (ČNS IFPI)	3
Dutch Albums (Album Top 100)	71
Finnish Albums (Suomen virallinen lista)	6
French Albums (SNEP)	16
German Albums (Offizielle Top 100)	2
Greek Albums (IFPI)	1
Hungarian Albums (MAHASZ)	19
Italian Albums (FIMI)	39
Japanese Albums (Oricon)	25
Mexican Albums (Top 100 Mexico)	33
Portuguese Albums (AFP)	21
Russian Albums (2M)	6
Spanish Albums (Promusicae)	30
Swedish Albums (Sverigetopplistan)	14
Swiss Albums (Schweizer Hitparade)	6
UK Albums (OCC)	96
US Billboard 200	23
US Digital Albums (Billboard)	19
US Top Rock Albums (Billboard)	6
US Top Hard Rock Albums (Billboard)	2

=== Year-end charts ===
Chart (2010)	Position
French Albums (SNEP)	138
German Albums (Offizielle Top 100)	29
Russian Albums (2M)	25
Swiss Albums (Schweizer Hitparade)	64

== Certifications ==
Region	Certification	Certified units/sales
Germany (BVMI)	Platinum	200,000^{^}
Russia (NFPF)	Platinum	10,000^{*}
^{*} Sales figures based on certification alone.^{^} Shipments figures based on certification alone.

== Release history ==
Region	Date
Greece	14 March 2010
Germany	19 March 2010
United Kingdom	22 March 2010
United States	23 March 2010
Brazil	15 April 2010
Japan	21 April 2010
