= Send Me an Angel (Scorpions song) =

1991 single by Scorpions

Single by Scorpions

from the album Crazy World
- B-side: "Crazy World"
- Released: 17 September 1991
- Studio: Goodnight LA (Los Angeles, California)
- Genre: Soft rock
- Length: 4:32
- Label: Vertigo; Mercury
- Songwriters: Rudolf Schenker; Klaus Meine
- Producers: Keith Olsen; Scorpions

Scorpions singles chronology
"Wind of Change" (1991)	"Send Me an Angel" (1991)	"Hit Between The Eyes" (1991)

Music video
- "Scorpions - Send Me An Angel" on YouTube

"Send Me an Angel" is a song by the German rock band Scorpions, recorded for their 11th studio album, Crazy World (1990). The song was composed by Rudolf Schenker, written by Klaus Meine, and produced by Keith Olsen and the band. It was released as the album's fourth and final single in September 1991 by Vertigo and Mercury Records. Along with "Wind of Change", the song became the album's signature track, reaching number 44 on the US Billboard Hot 100 chart on 25 January 1992, number eight on the Mainstream Rock Chart on 19 October 1991, and high chart positions in many European countries.

== Other versions ==
An orchestral version of the song was recorded for the 2000 orchestral album Moment of Glory that features vocals split with Italian singer Zucchero. An acoustic version of the song was also recorded for the 2001 acoustic album Acoustica.

== Trivia ==
In 1994, heavy metal band Black Sabbath released the Cross Purposes studio album which contains the same burning angel in the design of the cover that the "Send Me an Angel" single has.

== Track listings ==
- 7-inch single
1. "Send Me an Angel" – 4:32
2. "Crazy World" – 5:08
- CD maxi
1. "Send Me an Angel" – 4:32
2. "Crazy World" – 5:08
3. "Holiday (live)" – 3:15

== Personnel ==
Scorpions

- Klaus Meine – vocals
- Rudolf Schenker – lead guitar
- Matthias Jabs – rhythm & acoustic guitar
- Francis Buchholz – bass
- Herman Rarebell – drums

Additional musician

- Jim Vallance – keyboards

== Charts ==
=== Weekly charts ===
Chart (1991–1992)	Peak position
Australia (ARIA)	108
Austria (Ö3 Austria Top 40)	8
Belgium (Ultratop 50 Flanders)	4
Canada Top Singles (RPM)	19
Europe (Eurochart Hot 100)	19
Europe (European Hit Radio)	22
France (SNEP)	8
Germany (GfK)	5
Luxembourg (Radio Luxembourg)	6
Netherlands (Dutch Top 40)	4
Netherlands (Single Top 100)	4
Sweden (Sverigetopplistan)	4
Switzerland (Schweizer Hitparade)	14
UK Singles (Official Charts)	27
US Billboard Hot 100	44
US Mainstream Rock (Billboard)	8
US Cash Box Top 100	30

=== Year-end charts ===
Chart (1991)	Position
Belgium (Ultratop 50 Flanders)	27
Europe (Eurochart Hot 100)	88
Germany (Media Control)	74
Netherlands (Dutch Top 40)	34
Netherlands (Single Top 100)	48
Sweden (Topplistan)	70

Chart (1992)	Position
Sweden (Topplistan)	67

== Release history ==
Region	Date	Format(s)	Label(s)	Ref.
Europe	17 September 1991	7-inch vinyl; CD	Mercury	
United Kingdom	18 November 1991	7-inch vinyl; 12-inch vinyl; CD; cassette	Vertigo; Phonogram	
Australia	2 December 1991	CD; cassette	Mercury	
