= Rhythm of Love (Scorpions song) =

Single by Scorpions

from the album Savage Amusement
- Released: 23 May 1988
- Recorded: 1988
- Studio: Dierks Studios, Stommeln, Scorpio Sound Studios, Hannover, West Germany
- Genre: Glam metal
- Length: 3:47
- Label: Harvest/EMI
- Songwriters: Rudolf Schenker, Klaus Meine
- Producer: Dieter Dierks

Scorpions singles chronology
"No One Like You (live)" (1985)	"Rhythm of Love" (1988)	"Believe in Love" (1988)

Music video
- "Rhythm of Love" on YouTube

"Rhythm of Love" is a single by the German heavy metal band Scorpions from their tenth studio album Savage Amusement. It was released on Harvest/EMI as a single in 1988. The single peaked at number six on the US Mainstream Rock Chart. It also attained the No. 75 position on the U.S. Billboard Hot 100, while reaching No. 59 on the UK Singles Chart.

== Music video ==
The video for the song, which depicts the band performing in a science fiction setting, features the model Joan Severance as one of several women enjoying the band's performance.

== Charts ==
Chart (1988)	Peak position
UK Singles (OCC)	59
US Billboard Hot 100	75
US Mainstream Rock (Billboard)	6
