= Erwin Musper =

Duch music producer

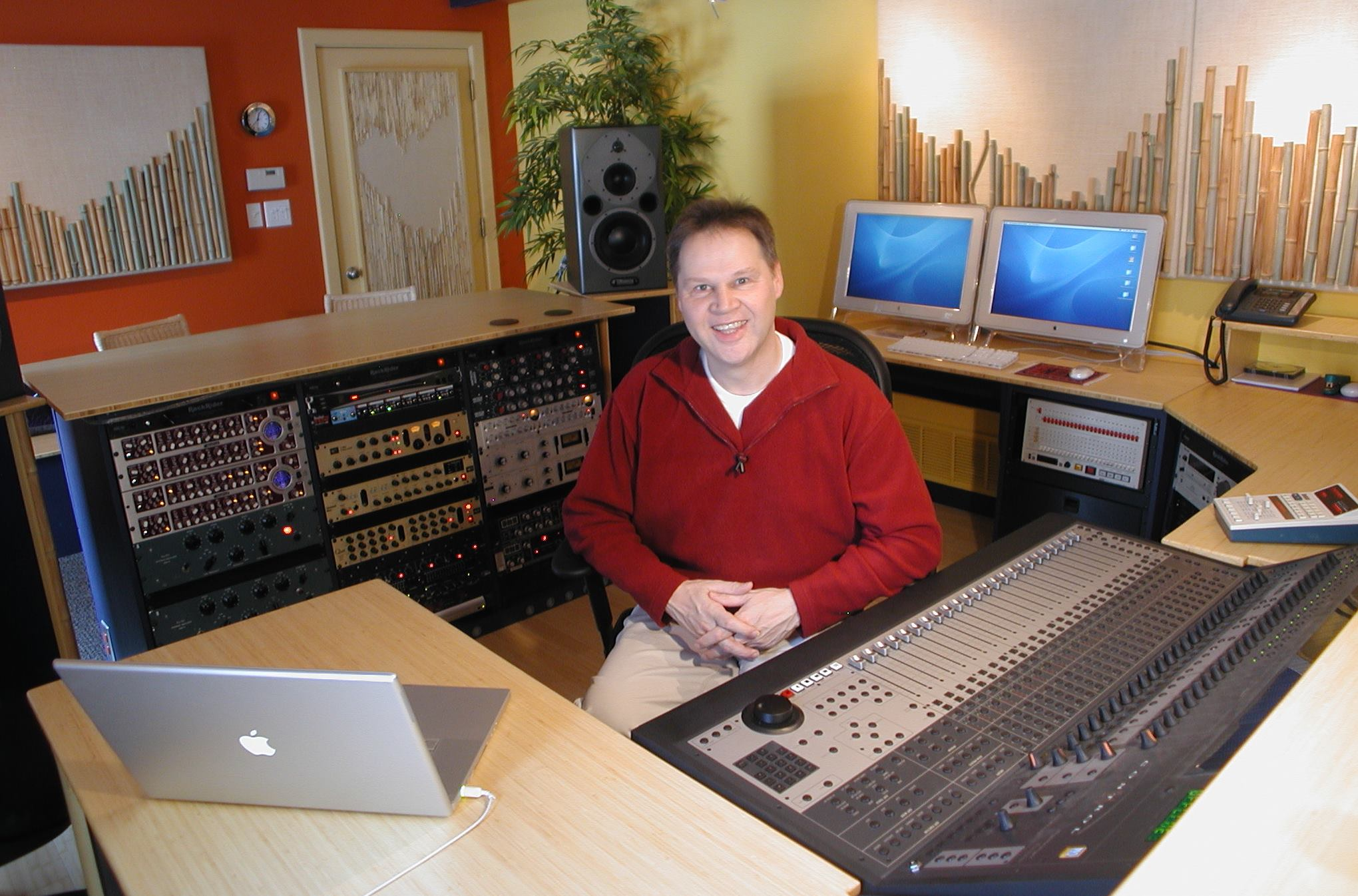
Erwin Musper

Erwin Musper (born 11 December 1948, The Hague) is a Dutch music producer and former keyboardist/singer for Dutch bands Windmill and Partner. Musper is also an internationally acclaimed mixer, producer and engineer of acts such as Anouk, Doe Maar, Toontje Lager, Normaal, Herman Brood, Solution, Chicago, Gorky Park, Elton John, Jeff Beck, Paco de Lucia, Metallica, Vengeance, Van Halen, Bon Jovi, Def Leppard, and Scorpions. From 1993 until 2015, Musper wrote a monthly column for the Dutch music magazine Music Maker.
