= Lower Saxony Order of Merit =

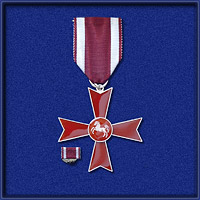
- Type: Civil order of merit
- Awarded for: Outstanding contributions to the state of Lower Saxony
- Country: Germany
- Presented by: the Minister-President of Lower Saxony
- Established: 27 March 1961
- Ribbon bar of the order

Precedence
- Next (higher): Lower Saxony State Medal (Niedersächsische Landesmedaille)

The Lower Saxony Order of Merit (German: Niedersächsischer Verdienstorden) is a civil order of merit, of the German State of Lower Saxony. The order was established 27 March 1961. The order is presented in three classes, the highest is the Grand Cross of Merit (Großes Verdienstkreuz), the next is the Cross of Merit First Class (Verdienstkreuz 1. Klasse), and the lowest is the Cross of Merit on Ribbon (Verdienstkreuz am Bande).
