= Rudolf Schenker =

German guitarist (born 1948)

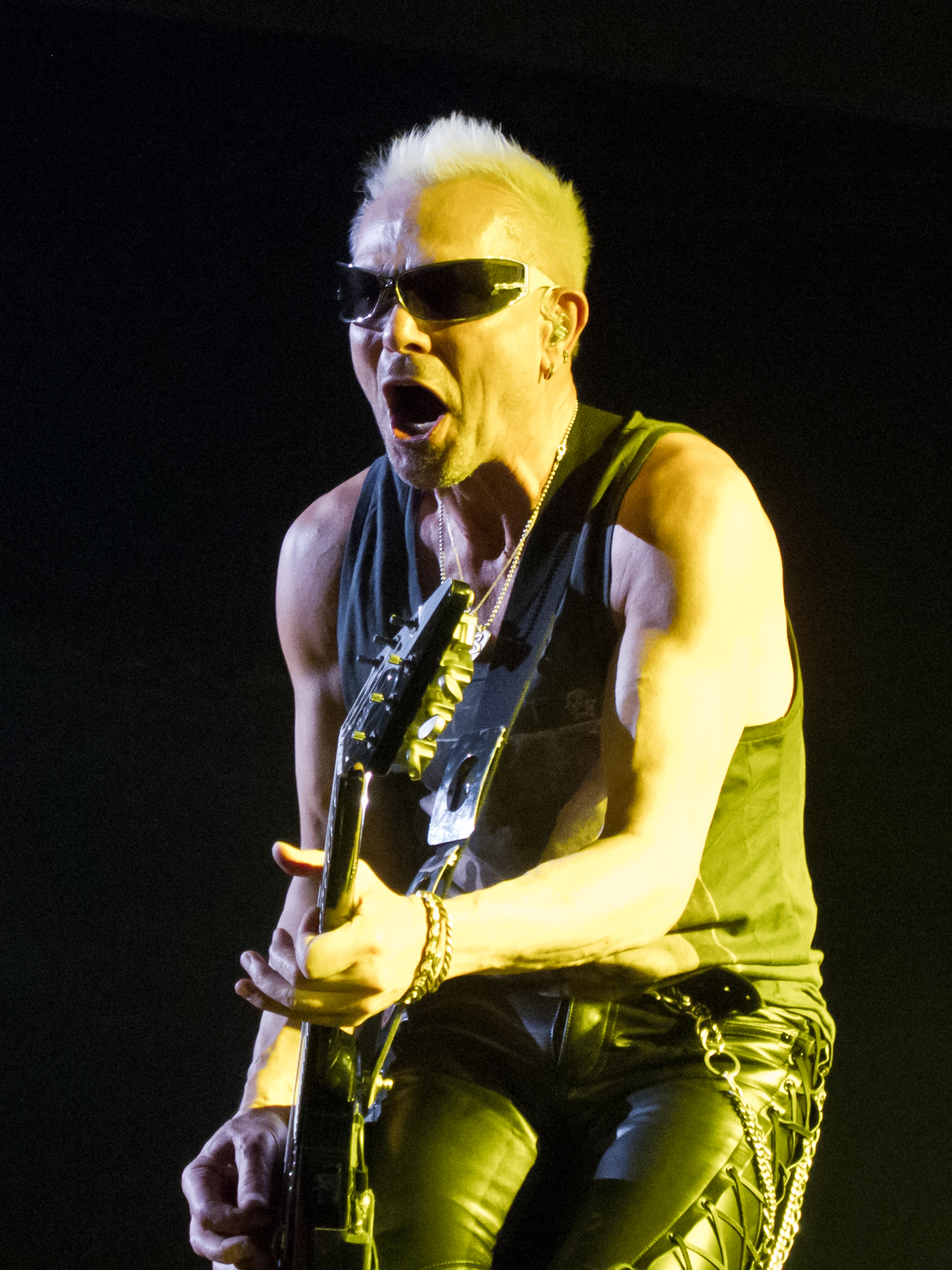
- Schenker performing in 2014

Background information
- Born: Heinrich Rudolf Schenker; 31 August 1948 (age 77); Hildesheim, Germany
- Genres: Hard rock; heavy metal; glam metal
- Occupations: Musician, songwriter
- Instruments: Guitar, Vocals
- Years active: 1963–present
- Label: BMG

Heinrich Rudolf Schenker (born 31 August 1948) is a German guitarist and songwriter, best known as the founder and leader of the hard rock band Scorpions. He is the rhythm and lead guitarist, primary songwriter and the sole constant member of the band. He is also the CEO/owner-manager of the Scorpions Musik-Produktions-und Verlagsgesellschaft mbH (Scorpions music production and publishing company) and owner/founder of the Scorpio-Sound-Studios in Lower Saxony. He is the older brother of Michael Schenker.

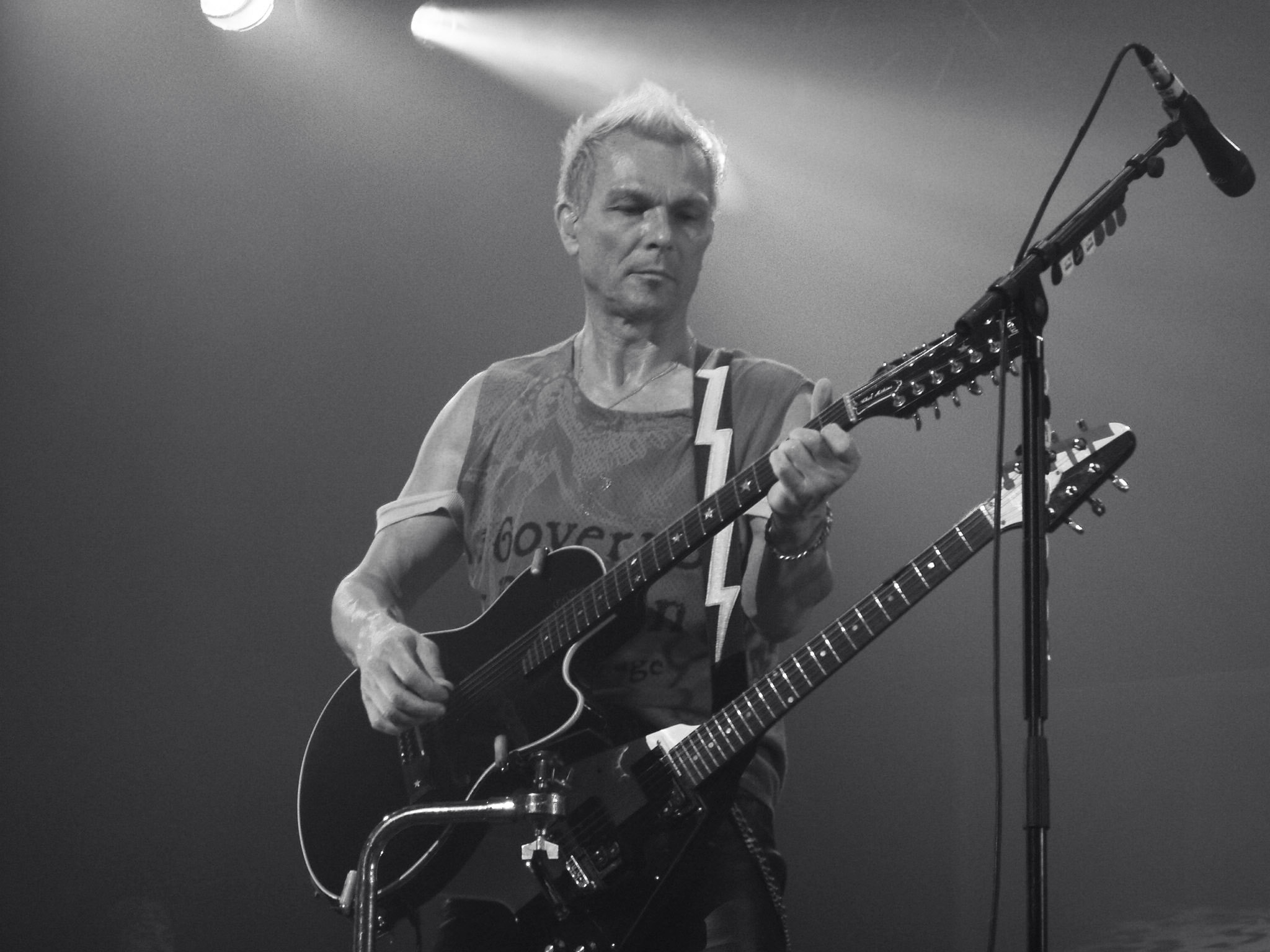
Schenker performing in 2007

Schenker was awarded the City of Hanover Plaque as well as the Cross of Merit First Class of the Lower Saxony Order of Merit in 2000.

== Equipment ==
Some of Schenker's main live guitars in recent years have been Dommenget — the same maker that produced Klaus Meine's live guitar and many guitars for Matthias Jabs. Schenker's signature models are "Gibson Rudolf Schenker Flying V", the Dommenget "Ferrari" V, PGG "Scorpions Golden Jubilee" Flying V, PGG "Veetle" Flying V and the "Scorpions" V.
