= Klaus Meine =

German singer

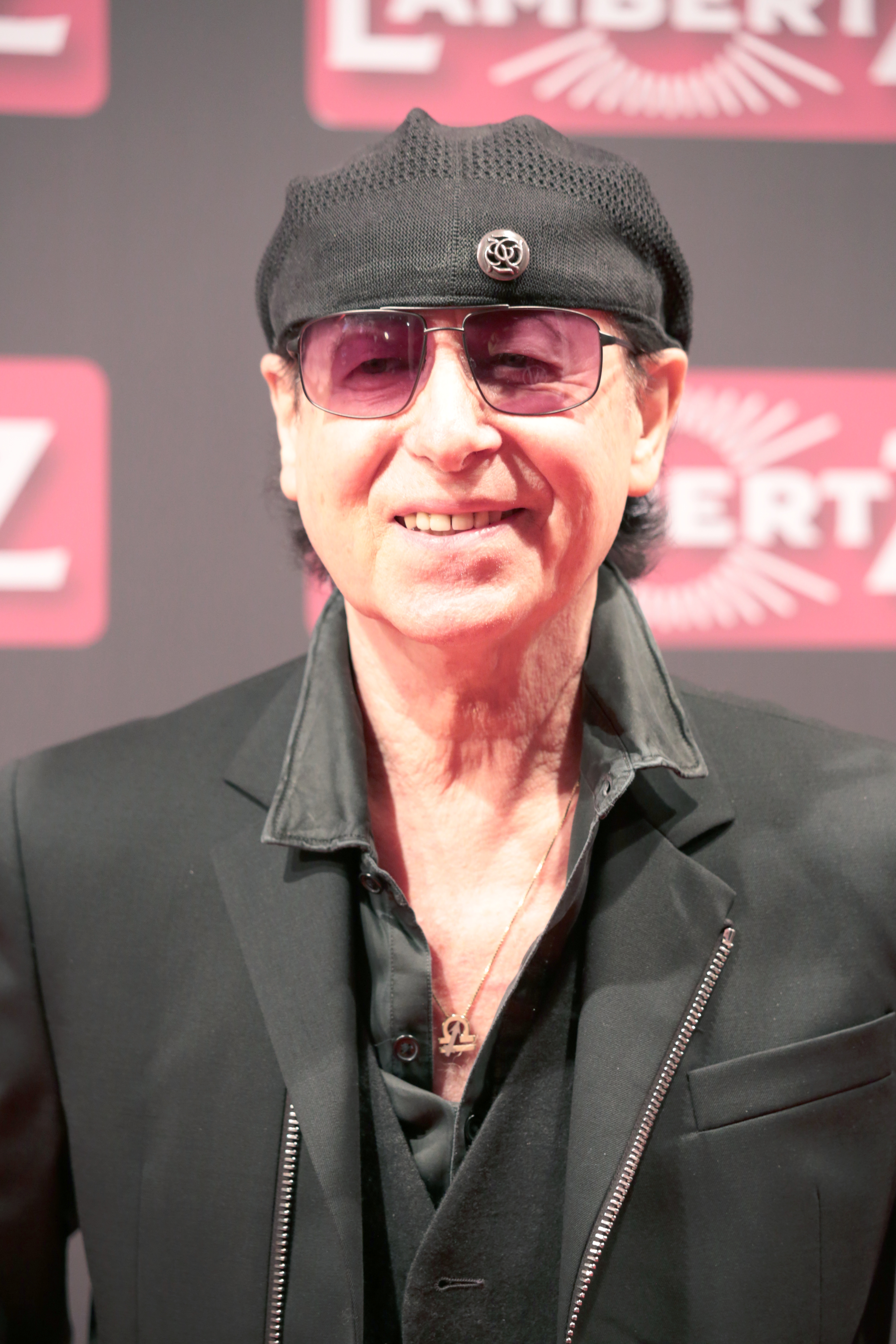
- Meine in 2018

Background information
- Born: Klaus Willi Meine; 25 May 1948 (age 78); Hanover, Lower Saxony, Germany
- Genres: Hard rock; heavy metal
- Occupations: Singer, songwriter
- Years active: 1965–present
- Member of: Scorpions

Klaus Meine (German pronunciation: [klaʊs ˈmaɪnə]; born 25 May 1948) is a German singer, best known as the longtime frontman and primary lyricist of the hard rock band Scorpions. Meine and guitarist Rudolf Schenker are the only two members of the group to appear on every Scorpions album, though he did not join the band until 1969, four years after its founding. Meine placed at number 22 on Hit Parader's 'Top Heavy Metal Vocalists of All Time' list in 2006.

== Biography ==
He was influenced by Elvis Presley, Cliff Richard, Little Richard, Tommy Steele, Roy Orbison, the Beatles, the Everly Brothers and the Rolling Stones. Meine writes most of the lyrics to Scorpions' songs. He and former Scorpions drummer Herman Rarebell also shared lyrical authorship on some songs, including the major hits "Rock You Like a Hurricane" and "Still Loving You". Meine composed some songs alone like "Wind of Change", "You and I", "But the Best for You", "Does Anyone Know", "A Moment in a Million Years", "Moment of Glory", "I Wanted to Cry", "Back to You", "My City, My Town", "Follow Your Heart", "Rock'n' Roll Band", "The World We Used to Know" and "Who We Are".

He has played guitar on two Scorpions songs: "Coast to Coast" and "Follow Your Heart".

After a 1981 world tour and during the recording of the Blackout album, Meine lost his voice to the extent that he could not even speak properly. He was advised by his doctor to consider another profession. However, Scorpions stuck together and, after therapy and two vocal cord surgeries, Meine's voice recovered.

Meine and Scorpions performed on the Live in Berlin rendition of Roger Waters' "The Wall" in 1990. He was a featured singer during the performance.

Meine was awarded the city of Hanover plaque in 2000. as well as the Cross of Merit First Class (Verdienstkreuz 1. Klasse) of the Lower Saxony Order of Merit.

Dommenget released a Klaus Meine signature guitar that was given to him on his 60th birthday in 2008, which he used on the Humanity World Tour and the Get Your Sting and Blackout World Tour.

Klaus' beyond-Scorpions collaborations include "Bridge to Heaven" with Uli Jon Roth, "Send Me an Angel", "Bigger than Life", "Keep the World Safe" and "Jerusalem of Gold" with Israeli singer Liel Kolet, "Bis wohin reicht mein Leben" from Rilke Projekt, "Wind of Change" with the tenor José Carreras, and the song "Dying for an Angel" from the album The Wicked Symphony by Avantasia.

== See also ==
- MTV Unplugged - Live in Athens
