= Matthias Jabs =

German guitarist (born 1955)

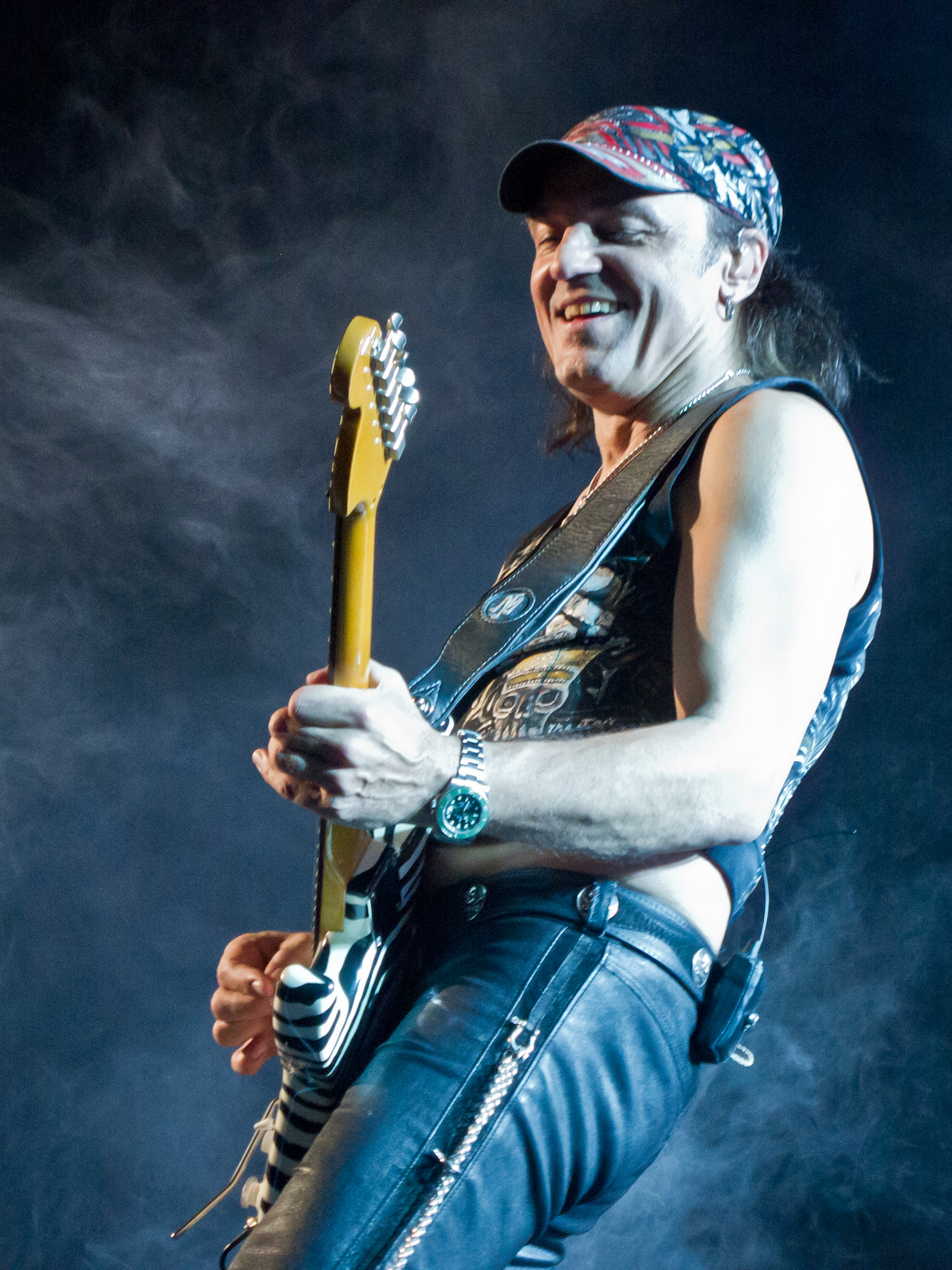
- Jabs with the Scorpions in 2014

Background information
- Born: 25 October 1955 (age 70); Hannover, West Germany
- Genres: Hard rock; heavy metal; glam metal
- Occupations: Musician, songwriter
- Instrument: Guitar
- Years active: 1975–present
- Member of: Scorpions

Matthias Jabs (born 25 October 1955) is a German musician, best known as the lead/rhythm guitarist of the hard rock band Scorpions. He has played on all but the first five Scorpions studio albums, starting with Lovedrive (1979). He owns a music store, MJ Guitars, in Munich.

== Career ==
Jabs was discovered by Scorpions' bassist Francis Buchholz, who had tutored him in mathematics to earn extra money while still in school. Buchholz subsequently recommended the band give him an audition after lead guitarist Uli Roth quit the band in 1978. Before joining the Scorpions, Jabs played for the bands Lady (1977–1978), Fargo (1976–1977) and Deadlock (1975–1976).

=== Departure of Uli Roth ===
For Taken by Force, RCA Records made a determined effort to promote the album in stores and on the radio. The album's single, "Steamrock Fever", was added to some of RCA's radio promotional records, but Roth was not happy with the commercial direction the band was taking. Although he performed on the band's Japanese tour, he departed to form his own band, Electric Sun, prior to the release of the follow-up live album Tokyo Tapes. Tokyo Tapes was released in the US and Europe six months after its Japanese release. By that time in mid 1978, after auditioning around 140 guitarists, Scorpions recruited Matthias Jabs to replace Roth.

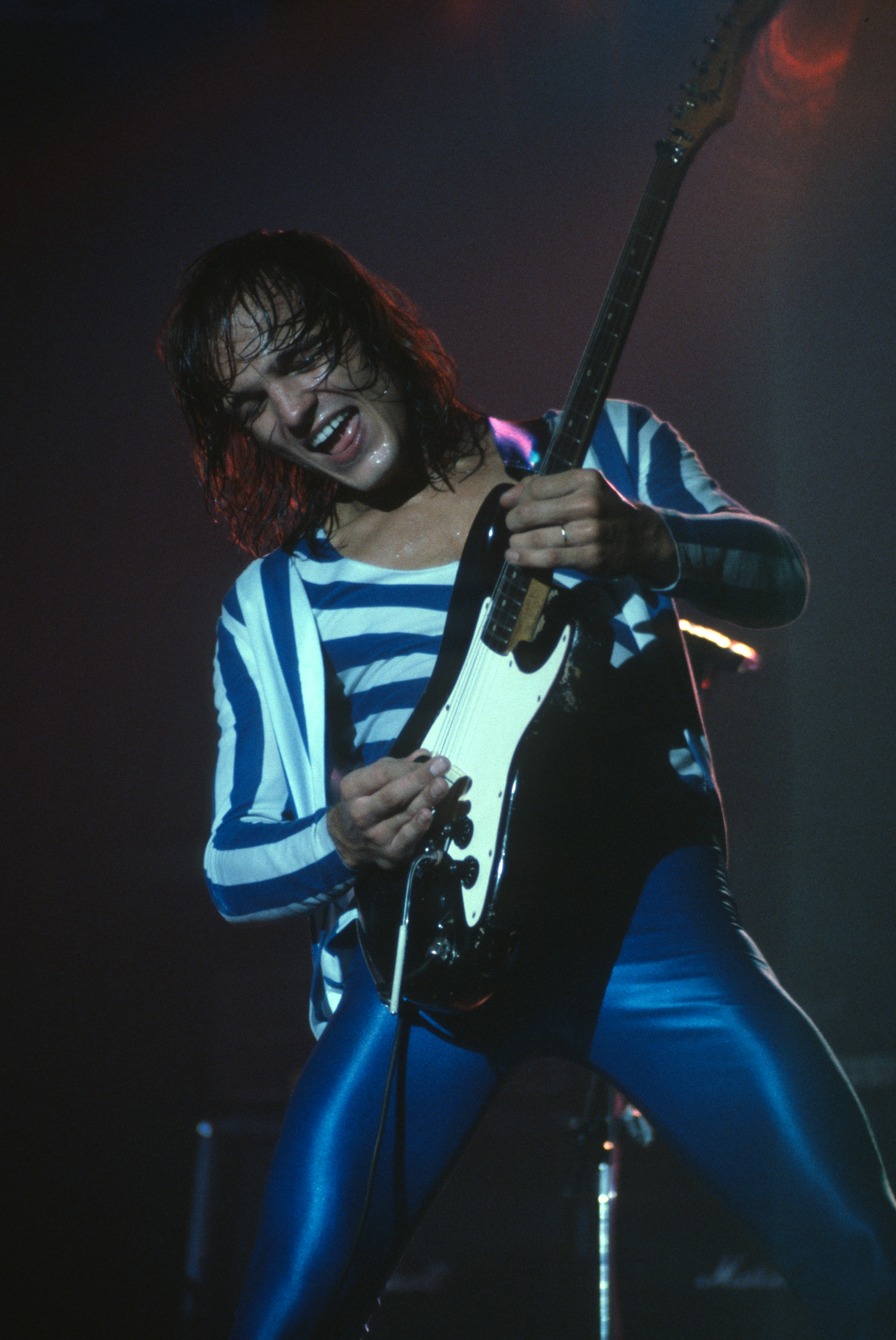
Matthias Jabs performing with Scorpions at the Aragon Ballroom, Chicago, 1980

=== Michael Schenker's short stint back in the group ===
Following the addition of Jabs, Scorpions left RCA for Mercury Records in the United States and Harvest/EMI Electrola worldwide to record their next album, Lovedrive. Michael Schenker also returned to the group for a short period during the recordings for the album. This gave the band three guitarists (though Schenker's contribution to the final release was limited to only three songs). The result was Lovedrive, an album which some critics consider to be the pinnacle of their career. Containing such fan favourites as "Loving You Sunday Morning", "Always Somewhere", "Lovedrive", "Holiday" and the instrumental "Coast to Coast", it firmly cemented the 'Scorpions formula' of hard rock songs mixed with melodic ballads.

After the completion and release of the album the band decided to retain Michael in the band, forcing Jabs to leave. However, in April 1979, after only a few weeks on the tour, Michael quit. Jabs was immediately brought in to permanently replace him.

Jabs's playing style was a large part of Lovedrive's fresher, newer, heavier sound. This "Van Halen-like" sound would become the band's signature as it would propel them into superstardom in the 1980s.

In 2000, he was awarded the city of Hanover plaque and the Cross of Merit on Ribbon (Verdienstkreuz am Bande) of the Lower Saxony Order of Merit.
