= Timeless Passages =

Compilation album by Eloy
- Released: 24 February 2003
- Recorded: 1975–1998
- Genre: Progressive rock
- Length: 155:45
- Label: Harvest / EMI Electrola

Eloy chronology
| Ocean 2: The Answer (1998) | Timeless Passages (2003) | Visionary (2009) |

Audio sample
- "Poseidon's Creation" (live in Munich, 1994): file; help

Professional ratings
Review scores
| Source | Rating |
|---|---|
| Progwereld | Positive |

Timeless Passages is a double compilation album by the German rock band Eloy, released in 2003.

It compiles songs from every Eloy studio album released between 1975 and 1998, except Performance (1983) and Destination (1992). It also includes a previously unreleased live version of the song "Poseidon's Creation", recorded in Munich in 1994.

The songs were selected by Eloy leader Frank Bornemann, who was approached by EMI Electrola with the vision to create an "organic unity through musical transitions between the songs", a task Bornemann found "extremely difficult to realize". Sorting the songs in order to match EMI's vision was done by the band's longtime graphics designer and friend Michael Narten, and master engineer Hans-Jörg Maucksch.

Narten also designed the album's booklet, combining elements from the covers of every studio album represented. Bornemann appreciated his work with "unreserved applause".

Various past members of the band were invited to comment on songs they co-wrote and/or played on, with their comments included in the album's booklet.

== Track listing ==
Music by Eloy, lyrics by Jürgen Rosenthal except where noted.

=== Disc one ===
| No. | Title | Writer(s) | Original Album | Length |
|---|---|---|---|---|
| 1. | "Decay of Logos" | | Ocean | 8:17 |
| 2. | "LOST?? (The Decision)" | | Dawn | 5:01 |
| 3. | "The Midnight-Fight / The Victory of Mental Force" | | Dawn | 8:06 |
| 4. | "Master of Sensation" | | Silent Cries and Mighty Echoes | 5:59 |
| 5. | "Silhouette" (single edit) | Eloy; Jim McGillivray | Colours | 3:26 |
| 6. | "The Bells of Notre Dame" (remix) | Eloy; Frank Bornemann, Gordon Bennit | Power and the Passion | 6:18 |
| 7. | "Sphinx" | Eloy; Sigi Hausen, Bornemann | Planets | 6:42 |
| 8. | "All Life Is One" (remix) | Eloy; Martine Ryan, Andrew Ward | Metromania | 6:27 |
| 9. | "Rainbow" | Bornemann, Achim Gieseler; Bornemann | Ra | 5:13 |
| 10. | "Point of No Return" | Eloy; Hausen, Bornemann | Planets | 5:25 |
| 11. | "Ro Setau" (edit) | Bornemann | Ocean 2: The Answer | 5:00 |
| 12. | "Poseidon's Creation" (live in Munich, 1994) | | Previously unreleased; original studio version from Ocean | 11:28 |
| Total length: | | | | 77:37 |

=== Disc two ===
| No. | Title | Writer(s) | Original Album | Length |
|---|---|---|---|---|
| 1. | "Time to Turn" | Eloy; Hausen | Time to Turn | 4:31 |
| 2. | "End of an Odyssey" | Eloy; Hausen | Time to Turn | 9:23 |
| 3. | "Voyager of the Future Race" | Bornemann, Michael Gerlach; Bornemann | Ra | 6:25 |
| 4. | "At the Gates of Dawn" | Eloy | Planets | 4:14 |
| 5. | "The Tides Return Forever" | Bornemann, Gerlach; Bornemann | The Tides Return Forever | 6:35 |
| 6. | "The Sun-Song" | | Dawn | 4:51 |
| 7. | "Follow the Light" (remix) | Eloy; Ryan, Ward | Metromania | 9:45 |
| 8. | "The Apocalypse" a) "Silent Cries Divide the Night" b) "The Vision-Burning" c) "Force Majeure" | | Silent Cries and Mighty Echoes | 14:52 |
| 9. | "Illuminations" (remix) | Eloy; McGillivray | Colours | 6:14 |
| 10. | "The Answer" | Bornemann | Ocean 2: The Answer | 11:19 |
| Total length: | | | | 77:50 |

== Personnel ==
Musicians

See each original album's Personnel section accordingly.
Musicians playing on previously unreleased track "Poseidon's Creation" (live in Munich, 1994) are:

- Frank Bornemann: lead guitar, vocals
- Steve Mann: guitar
- Michael Gerlach: keyboards
- Klaus-Peter Matziol: bass
- Bodo Schopf: drums

Production

- Frank Bornemann: songs compilation
- Michael Narten: songs assortment
- Hans-Jörg Maucksch: mastering, songs assortment

Artwork

- Michael Narten: art direction, graphics design
