= Reincarnation on Stage =

Live album by Eloy
- Released: 17 January 2014
- Recorded: September 2012 – January 2013
- Genre: Prog rock, symphonic rock
- Length: 137:28
- Label: Artist Station
- Producer: Frank Bornemann

Eloy chronology
Visionary (2009)	Reincarnation on Stage (2014)	The Vision, the Sword and the Pyre – Part I (2017)

Professional ratings
Review scores
Source	Rating
ArtRock	8/10 stars
Eclipsed	9/10 stars
Rock Overdose	95/100
Rocking.gr	Positive
Rocks	Positive
RockTimes	Positive

Reincarnation on Stage is the second live album by the German rock band Eloy, released in 2014.

The album was recorded on various locations during the band's 2012–2013 tour in Germany and Switzerland. It was the first Eloy live album in 36 years, since Live was released in 1978.

== Background ==
After the release of Visionary in 2009, Eloy's leader Frank Bornemann had no intentions of getting the band back together full-time and support the album with a concert tour. The band worked on and released The Legacy Box in 2010, but had no clear plans for the future.

In 2011 Eloy received and accepted requests to play three live concerts: on 2 July at the Z7 Konzertfabrik in Pratteln, on 8 July at the Night of the Prog in Freilichtbühne Loreley, and on 17 July at the Burg Herzberg Festival in Breitenbach am Herzberg.

The fans' reaction was enthusiastic, and Eloy began receiving a flood of letters asking them to hold a regular tour in the near future. Τhe band decided to satisfy the fans' demand and started making plans to tour Germany in 2012, but the plans were interrupted by an extraordinary offer: to play for the first time in the US, at the famous NEARfest, on 24 June 2012. Eloy were about to headline the final day of the festival, but they were forced to cancel their appearance, as Frank Bornemann was still recovering from a serious accident he suffered in March 2012.

Despite the setback, Eloy went on with their German tour plans as soon as Bornemann was healthy enough to perform. With the addition of a date in Switzerland, they played 9 concerts between September 2012 and January 2013. The best moments of that tour were immortalized in Reincarnation on Stage.

== Reception ==
The album entered the German charts on 31 January 2014 and charted for two weeks, peaking at the 34th position. It was the first Eloy album to chart since Ra in 1988.

Frank Bornemann himself believes that Reincarnation on Stage is the quintessential Eloy work, stating that "If you have this album, then you have everything, the essence of Eloy".

== Track listing ==
CD1

No.	Title	Writer(s)	Original Album	Length
1.	"Namaste (intro)"	Frank Bornemann	Previously Unreleased	2:49
2.	"Child Migration"	Eloy; Jim McGillivray	Colours	5:26
3.	"Paralysed Civilization"	Bornemann; Bornemann, Michael Gerlach	Ocean 2: The Answer	7:58
4.	"Mysterious Monolith"	Eloy; Sigi Hausen, Bornemann	Planets	6:40
5.	"Age of Insanity"	Bornemann	Visionary	7:12
6.	"The Apocalypse"	Eloy; Jürgen Rosenthal	Silent Cries and Mighty Echoes	11:09
7.	"Silhouette"	Eloy; McGillivray	Colours	3:58
8.	"Poseidon's Creation"	Eloy; Rosenthal	Ocean	11:24
9.	"Time to Turn"	Eloy; Hausen	Time to Turn	4:20
10.	"The Sun-Song"	Eloy; Rosenthal	Dawn	5:11
11.	"Horizons"	Eloy; McGillivray	Colours	4:09
12.	"Illuminations"	Eloy; McGillivray	Colours	6:30
Total length:				76:46

CD2

No.	Title	Writer(s)	Original Album	Length
1.	"Follow the Light"	Eloy; Martine Ryan, Andrew Ward	Metromania	8:00
2.	"Awakening of Consciousness"	Bornemann; Bornemann, Gerlach	Ocean 2: The Answer	5:55
3.	"The Tides Return Forever"	Bornemann, Gerlach; Bornemann	The Tides Return Forever	7:03
4.	"Ro Setau"	Bornemann	Ocean 2: The Answer	7:02
5.	"Mystery (The Secret, Part 2)"	Bornemann	Visionary	8:58
6.	"Decay of Logos"	Eloy; Rosenthal	Ocean	8:20
7.	"Atlantis' Agony at June 5th – 8498, 13 P.M. Gregorian Earthtime"	Eloy; Rosenthal	Ocean	7:55
8.	"The Bells of Notre Dame"	Eloy; Bornemann, Gordon Bennit	Power and the Passion	5:49
9.	"Thoughts"	Bornemann	Visionary	1:40
Total length:				60:42

== Personnel ==
All information according to the album's liner notes.

Eloy

- Frank Bornemann: vocals, guitar
- Klaus-Peter Matziol: bass
- Michael Gerlach: keyboards
- Hannes Folberth: keyboards
- Bodo Schopf: drums, percussion

Guest musicians

- Steve Mann: guitar
- Alexandra Seubert: vocals, backing vocals
- Bettina Lux: backing vocals
- Anke Renner: backing vocals

Production

- Frank Bornemann: production, mixing, pre-mastering
- Sven Geiger: recording
- Mirko Hofmann: mixing assistant
- Arne Neurand: mixing assistant
- Michael Krzizek: pre-mastering assistant
- Hans-Jörg Maucksch: mastering

Artwork

- Michael Narten: graphic design, photography
- Christian Appelt: photography
- Rudi Brandt: photography
- Gerald Dietze: photography
- Carsten Marzina: photography
