= The Best of Eloy Vol. 2 – The Prime 1976–1979 =

Compilation album by Eloy
- Released: 10 April 1996
- Recorded: 1976–1979
- Studio: Tonstudio Nedeltschev / Sound Studio N, Cologne
- Genre: Prog rock, space rock
- Length: 54:02
- Label: EMI Electrola
- Producer: Eloy

Eloy chronology
The Tides Return Forever (1994)	The Best of Eloy Vol. 2 – The Prime 1976–1979 (1996)	Ocean 2: The Answer (1998)

The Best of Eloy Vol. 2 – The Prime 1976–1979 is the second of a two-part compilation by the German rock band Eloy, released in 1996. The first part, The Best of Eloy Vol. 1 – The Early Days 1972–1975, was released in 1994.

It compiles songs from the albums Dawn, Ocean and Silent Cries and Mighty Echoes, the later three of the six studio albums Eloy released during the 70s under the EMI Electrola label.

As indicated by the album's title, the 1976–1979 period is considered the prime of Eloy's career. In 1995, a year before the compilation's release, Ocean was certified Gold, with sales that exceed 250,000 units in Germany. It remains the most commercially successful German prog rock album ever.

== Track listing ==
Music by Eloy, lyrics by Jürgen Rosenthal.

No.	Title	Original Album	Length
1.	"Awakening"	Dawn	2:39
2.	"Between the Times"	Dawn	6:08
3.	"The Sun-Song"	Dawn	4:53
4.	"The Midnight-Fight / The Victory Of Mental Force"	Dawn	8:09
5.	"Decay of Logos"	Ocean	8:17
6.	"a) Astral Entrance" "b) Master of Sensation"	Silent Cries and Mighty Echoes	9:03
7.	"The Apocalypse" a) "Silent Cries Divide the Night" b) "The Vision-Burning" c) "Force Majeure"	Silent Cries and Mighty Echoes	14:53
Total length:			54:02

== Personnel ==
See Dawn personnel, Ocean personnel and Silent Cries and Mighty Echoes personnel accordingly.
