= Chronicles I (album) =

Compilation album by Eloy
- Released: 22 November 1993
- Recorded: Autumn 1993
- Studio: Horus Sound, Hanover; Pinkball, Berlin
- Genre: Progressive rock; art rock
- Length: 67:53
- Label: ACI
- Producer: Frank Bornemann

Eloy chronology
Destination (1992)	Chronicles I (1993)	Chronicles II (1994)

Audio sample
- "Spirit in Chains '93": file; help

Professional ratings
Review scores
Source	Rating
Allmusic	4/5 stars
Music Street Journal	favorable
Rock Hard	7/10 stars

Chronicles I is the first of a two-part compilation of re-recorded songs by the German rock band Eloy, released in 1993. The second part, Chronicles II, was released the following year.

As older Eloy albums had relatively poor sound quality due to the technical limitations of the 70s and early 80s, Frank Bornemann decided to re-record some of their most popular songs using modern recording technologies. He also invited some of the former members of the band to play in the album, in order to reach the highest level of authenticity possible. As stated in the album's liner notes, "Chronicles should give you the chance to re-live Eloy's classics in an up-to-date sound, adequete to modern expectations".

Chronicles I contains selected songs from the albums Ocean (1977), Silent Cries and Mighty Echoes (1979), Colours (1980), Planets (1981) and Time to Turn (1982), as well as a previously unreleased track recorded in 1992 during the Destination recording sessions.

== Track listing ==
Writers credited according to each song's original album credits.

No.	Title	Writer(s)	Original Album	Length
1.	"Poseidon's Creation '93"	Eloy; Jürgen Rosenthal	Ocean	11:32
2.	"The Apocalypse '93"	Eloy; Rosenthal	Silent Cries and Mighty Echoes	11:05
3.	"Silhouette '93"	Eloy; Jim McGillivray	Colours	3:11
4.	"Mysterious Monolith '93"	Eloy; Sigi Hausen, Frank Bornemann	Planets	6:12
5.	"Sphinx '93"	Eloy; Hausen, Bornemann	Planets	6:23
6.	"Illuminations '93"	Eloy; McGillivray	Colours	6:20
7.	"End of an Odyssey '93"	Eloy; Hausen	Time to Turn	9:17
8.	"Time to Turn '93"	Eloy; Hausen	Time To Turn	3:35
9.	"Spirit in Chains '93"	Bornemann, Michael Gerlach; Bornemann, Diana Baden	Previously unreleased	5:51
10.	"Say, is it Really True '93"	Eloy; Hausen	Time to Turn	4:27
Total length:				67:53

== Personnel ==
All information according to the album's liner notes, numbers in parentheses indicate specific tracks.

Eloy

- Frank Bornemann: guitar, vocals
- Michael Gerlach: keyboards

Eloy former members

- Klaus-Peter Matziol: bass
- Hannes Arkona: guitar
- Hannes Folberth: keyboards
- Fritz Randow: drums

Guest musicians

- Nico Baretta: drums
- Lenny Mac Dowell: flute
- Amy, Sabine, Anne and Brigitte: vocals (2, 8)

Production

- Frank Bornemann: production
- Gerhard Wölfle: engineering, mixing
- Michael Gerlach: engineering
