= The Best of Eloy Vol. 1 – The Early Days 1972–1975 =

Compilation album by Eloy
- Released: 1994
- Recorded: 1972–1975
- Studio: Windrose, Hamburg; EMI Electrola Studios, Cologne; Tonstudio Nedeltschev, Cologne
- Genre: Prog rock, space rock
- Length: 64:54
- Label: EMI Electrola
- Producer: Eloy, Jay Partridge

Eloy chronology
Chronicles II (1994)	The Best of Eloy Vol. 1 – The Early Days 1972–1975 (1994)	The Tides Return Forever (1994)

Alternative cover
- 1996 expanded re-issue cover

Professional ratings
Review scores
Source	Rating
Allmusic	4.5/5 stars

The Best of Eloy Vol. 1 – The Early Days 1972–1975 is the first of a two-part compilation by the German rock band Eloy, released in 1994. The second part, The Best of Eloy Vol. 2 – The Prime 1976–1979, was released in 1996.

It compiles songs from the albums Inside, Floating and Power and the Passion, the first three of the six studio albums Eloy released during the 70s under the EMI Electrola label. In 1996 the compilation was re-issued in the United States by Griffin Music, with a different artwork and two extra songs.

Renowned online music database Allmusic gave the album a star rating of 4.5 out of 5 and tagged it as an "Album Pick", which stands for the most representative album of an artist's entire body of work.

== Track listing ==
Writers credited according to each song's original album credits.

No.	Title	Writer(s)	Original Album	Length
1.	"Inside"	Eloy	Inside	6:35
2.	"Future City"	Eloy	Inside	5:35
3.	"The Light From Deep Darkness"	Eloy; Frank Bornemann, Erich Schriever	Floating	14:37
4.	"Castle In the Air"	Eloy; Bornemann, Schriever	Floating	7:13
5.	"Madhouse"	Eloy; Gordon Bennit	Floating	5:16
6.	"Love Over Six Centuries"	Eloy; Bornemann, Bennit	Power and the Passion	10:05
7.	"Mutiny"	Eloy; Bornemann, Bennit	Power and the Passion	9:07
8.	"The Bells Of Notre Dame"	Eloy; Bornemann, Bennit	Power and the Passion	6:26
Total length:				64:54

1996 Griffin Music reissue bonus tracks
No.	Title	Writer(s)	Original Album	Length
9.	"Daybreak"	Eloy	1970 B-Side single	3:42
10.	"Journey Into 1358"	Eloy; Bornemann, Bennit	Power and the Passion	2:55

== Personnel ==
See Inside personnel, Floating personnel and Power and the Passion personnel accordingly.
