= Live (Eloy album) =

Live album by Eloy
- Released: 2 May 1978
- Recorded: March 1978
- Genre: Prog rock, psychedelic rock, krautrock
- Length: 78:17
- Label: Harvest Records / EMI Electrola
- Producer: Eloy

Eloy chronology
Ocean (1977)	Live (1978)	Silent Cries and Mighty Echoes (1979)

Alternative cover
- 2004 remastered CD reissue cover

Professional ratings
Review scores
Source	Rating
ArtRock	8/10 stars
Only Solitaire	10/15 stars
Rockmachine	favorable
Sea of Tranquility	4.5/5 stars

Live is the first live album by the German rock band Eloy, released in 1978.

The album was recorded on various locations in March 1978, during the band's tour in Germany, France, and Switzerland.

Capitalizing on the big commercial success of Ocean, Eloy incorporated innovative and expensive technology during their shows, such as laser light show and pyrotechnics. The booked venues had a relatively small capacity of 2000–3000 persons to facilitate ticket sales, but the demand was surprisingly higher and hundreds of fans were left out of the sold-out venues every night, unable to secure a ticket.

Every show of the tour was recorded on a 24-track machine, but the result ended up being 80% useless due to technical mishandling that ruined the recordings. The only viable solution was to patch together intact parts of various recordings, to create continuous tracks. The band initially refused that option and were about to cancel the album's release, but since they had publicly announced it, they decided to compromise to avoid disappointing their fans.

Live entered the German charts in August 1978 for one week, peaking at the 35th position.

== Track listing ==
Music by Eloy, lyrics by Jürgen Rosenthal, except where noted

LP 1
No.	Title	Original album	Length
1.	"Poseidon's Creation"	Ocean	11:37
2.	"Incarnation of Logos"	Ocean	8:46
3.	"The Sun-Song"	Dawn	8:30
4.	"The Dance in Doubt and Fear"	Dawn	7:36

LP 2
No.	Title	Writer(s)	Original album	Length
1.	"Mutiny"	Eloy; Frank Bornemann, Gordon Bennit	Power and the Passion	9:56
2.	"Gliding into Light and Knowledge"		Dawn	4:24
3.	"Inside"	Eloy	Inside	6:34
4.	"Atlantis' Agony at June 5th – 8498, 13 P.M. Gregorian Earthtime"		Ocean	20:54
Total length:				78:17

== Personnel ==
Eloy

- Frank Bornemann: lead vocals, guitars
- Klaus-Peter Matziol: bass, vocals
- Detlev Schmidtchen: keyboards
- Jürgen Rosenthal: drums, percussion, voice

Production

- Eloy: production
- Andy Mietling: recording engineering
- Wolfgang Thierbach: mixing engineering

Artwork

- Andreas Wucke: photography
- Adam Backhausen: design

== Charts ==
Chart (1978)	Peak position
German Albums (Offizielle Top 100)	35
