= Performance (Eloy album) =

Studio album by Eloy
- Released: April 1983
- Recorded: 1982–1983
- Studio: Horus Sound Studio, Hanover, Germany
- Genre: Hard rock, progressive rock
- Length: 38:54
- Label: Harvest / EMI Electrola; Heavy Metal Worldwide (UK issue)
- Producer: Eloy

Eloy chronology
Time to Turn (1982)	Performance (1983)	Metromania (1984)

Alternative cover
- UK cover, with alternated and relocated band logo and title

Singles from Performance
- 1. "Fools / Heartbeat" Released: 1983

Audio sample
- "Heartbeat": file; help

Professional ratings
Review scores
Source	Rating
ArtRock	5/10 stars

Performance is the eleventh studio album by the German rock band Eloy, released in 1983.

Amidst the peak of the Neue Deutsche Welle, Frank Bornemann's will was to stay loyal to Eloy's prog rock roots following the project Planets / Time to Turn, while the rest of the band wanted to explore a more mainstream direction, with less complicated music.

Eventually, Bornemann gave in to the rest of the band's vision, but his contribution to the creation of Performance was significantly reduced, both as a composer and as a writer. The lyrics were written almost entirely by Sigi Hausen, known to Eloy from her contribution to Planets / Time to Turn, with Bornemann writing only some of the "Heartbeat" lyrics.

This musical experiment was not commercially successful, as Performance entered the German charts for only one week in May 1983, peaking at the 65th position. Its overall sales were mediocre compared to Planets / Time to Turn, as was the attendance of the supporting tour.

Reviewing their choices and doing something akin to the change of musical styles from Colours to Planets / Time to Turn during the 1980-81 period, the band decided to embrace Bornemann's vision and follow up Performance with an album much closer to Eloy's identity: Metromania.

== Track listing ==
Music by Eloy and lyrics by Sigi Hausen, except where noted.

No.	Title	Lyrics	Length
1.	"In Disguise"		4:29
2.	"Shadow and Light"		5:17
3.	"Mirador"		3:44
4.	"Surrender"		5:38
5.	"Heartbeat"	Sigi Hausen, Frank Bornemann	6:26
6.	"Fools"		5:10
7.	"A Broken Frame"		8:10
Total length:			38:54

2005 Remastered CD reissue bonus tracks
No.	Title	Length
8.	"Shadow and Light" (live in Paris, France, 1983)	5:08
9.	"Heartbeat" (live in Paris, France, 1983)	6:00
10.	"Fools" (live in Paris, France, 1983)	4:49

== Personnel ==
Eloy

- Frank Bornemann: guitars, lead vocals
- Hannes Arkona: guitars, keyboards
- Klaus-Peter Matziol: bass
- Hannes Folberth: keyboards, grand piano
- Fritz Randow: drums, percussion

Production

- Eloy: arrangement, production
- Jan Nemek: engineering, recording, mixing
- Harald Lepschies: engineering, recording
- Achim Schulze: engineering, recording

Artwork

- Walter Seyffer: artistic concept
- Ulli Dinger: photography

== Charts ==
Chart (1983)	Peak position
German Albums (Offizielle Top 100)	65
