= The Vision, the Sword and the Pyre – Part I =

Studio album by Eloy
- Released: 25 August 2017
- Studio: Artist Station, Hanover; Horus Sound, Hanover; Art of Music, Garlstorf
- Genre: Progressive rock
- Length: 62:30
- Label: Artist Station
- Producer: Frank Bornemann

Eloy chronology
Reincarnation on Stage (2014)	The Vision, the Sword and the Pyre – Part I (2017)	The Vision, the Sword and the Pyre – Part II (2019)

Professional ratings
Review scores
Source	Rating
ArtRock	6/10 stars
Background Magazine	4/5 stars
Get Ready to Rock!	4.5/5 stars
Hellfire	Favorable
Musik Reviews	10/15 stars
PowerMetal.de	6/10 stars
progVisions	4/5 stars
Progwereld	Favorable
Rock Hard	6.5/10 stars
Rocking.gr	Favorable
Rockmachine	Unfavorable
Sea of Tranquility	4/5 stars

The Vision, the Sword and the Pyre – Part I is the eighteenth studio album by German rock band Eloy, released in 2017.

It is the first part of a rock opera about the life of Jeanne d'Arc, the realization of which had been a wish of frontman Frank Bornemann's since the 1990s. The second and final part of the concept was released in 2019.

Bornemann described the research that led to the rock opera's realization as follows: "I actually really did invest a lot of time in getting this work off the ground. There were many conversations with qualified historians to get the details of her story and I read countless works of literature, even the documents on the legal process in order to get a profound knowledge. Naturally, I visited all the locations and places of significance to her story -and that really inspired me and gave me deep insight into the events, which can't be gained from reading books alone."

Practical proof that Bornemann's interest in Jeanne d'Arc dates back to the 90s is that she had already appeared in Eloy's music twice during that decade: firstly in Destination with the song "Jeanne d'Arc", and secondly in The Tides Return Forever, where the song "Company of Angels" is dedicated to her.

== Track listing ==
All lyrics and music by Frank Bornemann.

No.	Title	Length
1.	"The Age of the Hundred Years' War"	4:17
2.	"Domremy on 6 January 1412"	1:48
3.	"Early Signs... from a Longed for Miracle"	4:13
4.	"Autumn 1428 at Home"	0:55
5.	"The Call"	5:51
6.	"Vaucouleurs"	4:35
7.	"The Ride by Night... Towards the Predestined Fate" (Instrumental)	3:30
8.	"Chinon"	9:46
9.	"The Prophecy"	4:40
10.	"The Sword"	5:54
11.	"Orléans"	4:26
12.	"Les Tourelles"	7:24
13.	"Why?"	5:11

== Personnel ==
All information according to the album's liner notes, numbers in parentheses indicate specific tracks.

Eloy

- Frank Bornemann: vocals, guitar, additional keyboards
- Klaus-Peter Matziol: bass
- Michael Gerlach: keyboards
- Hannes Folberth: keyboards
- Kristof Hinz: drums, percussion

Guest musicians

- Julian Göke: bass, vocals (1)
- Isgaard Marke: vocals (9)
- Jessy Martens: vocals (13)
- Anke Renner: backing vocals (3, 5, 6, 11)
- Alexandra Seubert: backing vocals (3, 9, 11)
- Simon Moskon: backing vocals (3, 9)
- Sven-Arne Zinnke: backing vocals (5)
- Lisa Laage-Smidt: backing vocals (6)
- Simon Moskon: backing vocals (8)
- The Children's Choir of the Marktkirche Hannover: chorus vocals (9)
- Lisa Laage-Smidt: choir director (9)
- Jens Lück: keyboards (1, 5)
- Niklas Fischer: keyboards (3, 8)
- Artur Kühfuß: keyboards (5, 8)
- Christoph Van Hal: strings (1, 10)
- Volker Kuinke: recorder and flute (3, 6, 8, 10)
- Johannes Berger: bass viol (9)
- Kim Hutchinson: spoken voice (2)
- Kai Ritter: spoken voice (2, 4)
- Alice Merton: spoken voice (5, 6, 8)
- Bick Buttchereit: spoken voice (8)
- Eric Pulverich: spoken voice (8)
- Leon Kaack: spoken voice (8)
- Steve Mann: spoken voice (8)

Production

- Frank Bornemann: production, mixing
- Hans-Jörg Maucksch: mastering
- Niklas Fisher: engineering, mixing
- Martin Steidl: engineering, additional mixing
- Marten Berger: engineering
- Helge Preuss: engineering
- Mirko Hofmann: engineering
- Michael Gerlach: engineering
- Oliver Wiebe: engineering
- Jens Luekc: additional recordings

Artwork

- Michael Narten: graphic design

== Charts ==
Chart (2017)	Peak position
German Albums (Offizielle Top 100)	22
Swiss Albums (Schweizer Hitparade)	46
UK Progressive Albums (OCC)	27
