= Metromania =

Studio album by Eloy
- Released: 15 June 1984
- Recorded: 1984
- Studios: Horus Sound Studio, Hanover, Germany
- Genres: Hard rock, progressive rock, space rock
- Length: 40:24
- Labels: Harvest / EMI Electrola; Heavy Metal Worldwide (UK issue)
- Producer: Frank Bornemann

Eloy chronology
Performance (1983)	Metromania (1984)	Code Name: Wild Geese (1984)

Audio sample
- "Metromania": file; help

Professional ratings
Review scores
Source	Rating
Allmusic	1.5/5.0 stars
ArtRock	7/10 stars
Music Street Journal	favorable

Metromania is the twelfth studio album by the German rock band Eloy, released in 1984.

It is a concept album, telling the sci-fi story of a futuristic dystopia, controlled and oppressed by artificial intelligence. The protagonist tries to find hope and prospect by writing music and lyrics on a rooftop.

The term "metromania" (Greek: μετρομανία) means a mania for writing poetry, especially doggerel.

The artwork is a Rodney Matthews creation, as were the United Kingdom-exclusive artworks of the project Planets / Time to Turn.

== Synopsis ==
Rendition according to the album's lyrics

Surrounded by oppressive machines and clueless people, the protagonist feels trapped and without perspective, but hope begins to grow within him, and he finds motivation to fight for escape. ("Escape to the Heights", "Seeds Of Creation"). Experiencing a spiritual uplift, he feels an unprecedented connection with nature, which guides him to express himself through poetry ("All Life is One).

His creativity is expressed by singing one of his songs in front of a crowd. People are mesmerized and believe that he might be the messiah they are hoping for, but he categorically denies it ("The Stranger"). As a magical light fills his soul, it drives him to rouse the people towards a revolution against the oppression of man and the destruction of the environment by machines ("Follow The Light").

Some renegade police officers organized into motorcycle-riding squads patrol during the night, terrorizing the citizens as the protagonist watches from his roof ("Nightriders"). While on the roof, he realizes that the only way to escape, the means to overcome all fear and doubt, and the path to his freedom, is intensive writing ("Metromania").

== Track listing ==
Music by Eloy, lyrics by Martine Ryan and Andrew Ward, except where noted.

No.	Title	Lyrics	Length
1.	"Escape to the Heights"	Frank Bornemann, Mark Sarkautzky	5:03
2.	"Seeds of Creation"		4:28
3.	"All Life Is One"		6:28
4.	"The Stranger"		3:59
5.	"Follow the Light"		9:37
6.	"Nightriders"		4:39
7.	"Metromania"		6:10
Total length:			40:24

== Personnel ==
All information according to the album's liner notes.

Eloy

- Frank Bornemann: guitar, lead vocals
- Hannes Arkona: guitar, keyboards, vocoder, syncussion
- Klaus-Peter Matziol: bass
- Hannes Folberth: keyboards
- Fritz Randow: drums

Additional Vocalists (In liner notes order)

- Sabine Matziol
- "Janie" Jane James
- Romy Singh
- Kalle Bösel
- Monica
- Susanne
- Michael "Flexe" Flexig
- Rainer Przywara

Production

- Frank Bornemann: production
- Harald Lepschies: engineering, recording, mixing on all tracks except "Follow the Light"
- Bernd Jost: mixing on "Follow the Light"
- Jan Nemec: engineering on basic tracks
- Thomas Stiehler: engineering on basic tracks

Artwork

- Rodney Matthews: painting
