= Neufang Kulturfabrik =

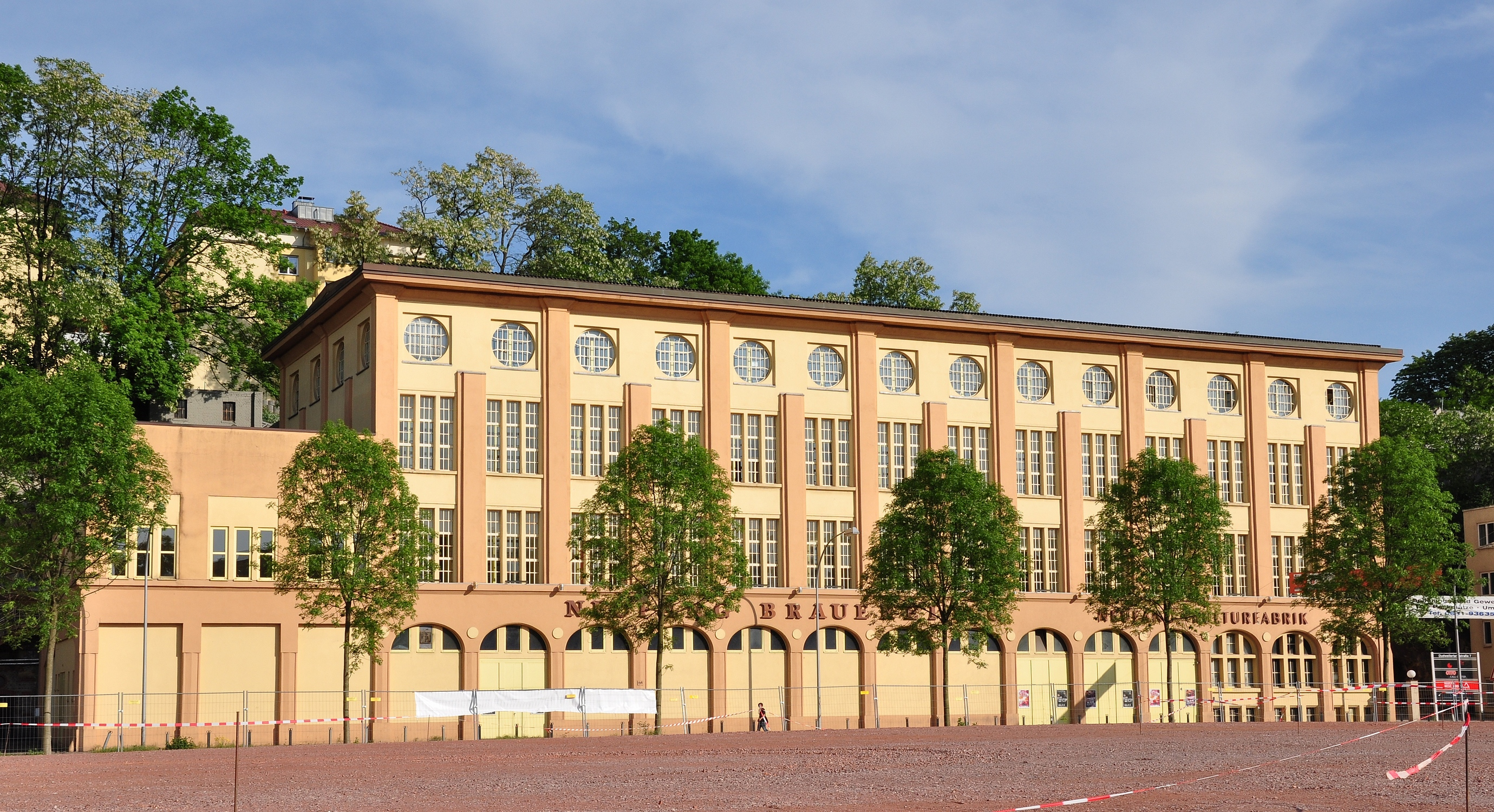
Neufang Kulturfabrik

Neufang Kulturfabrik was a live music venue in Saarbrücken, Germany. Originally opened as a brewery in 1815, it is now a disco club. Some of the artists that performed at the venue include Dio, Dream Theater, The Kinks and Eloy.
