= Power and the Passion =

Power and the Passion may refer to:

- Power and the Passion (album), a 1975 album by Eloy
- "Power and the Passion" (song), a 1982 song by Midnight Oil
  - The Power & The Passion, a 2001 tribute album to Midnight Oil
- Charles II: The Power and The Passion, a BBC mini-series
- The Power, The Passion an Australian soap opera
