= Visionary (Eloy album) =

Studio album by Eloy
- Released: 20 November 2009
- Recorded: December 2008 – July 2009
- Studios: Horus Sound, Hanover; Bodo Schopf's home studio, Stuttgart; Hitman Productions, Hanover
- Genre: Progressive rock
- Length: 54:03
- Label: Artist Station
- Producer: Frank Bornemann

Eloy chronology
Timeless Passages (2003)	Visionary (2009)	The Vision, the Sword and the Pyre – Part I (2017)

Singles from Visionary
- 1. "The Challenge (Time To Turn, Part 2) (Radio Edit) / The Challenge (Time To Turn, Part 2) / Summernight Symphony" Released: 2009

Audio sample
- "The Challenge (Time to Turn, Part 2)": file; help

Professional ratings
Review scores
Source	Rating
ArtRock	7/10 stars
Allmusic	3.5/5 stars
Background Magazine	2/5 stars
Music Street Journal	favorable
Rock Hard	5/10 stars
Rocking.gr	favorable
Sea of Tranquility	4/5 stars

Visionary is the seventeenth studio album by the German rock band Eloy, released in 2009.

At the time of its release, it was the first Eloy album in eleven years, as they were in hiatus since December 1998, two months after the release of Ocean 2: The Answer. Despite the long break, the reunited band had the same four members as the last time they were active, with the addition of Hannes Folberth, a former Eloy member from the 1980–1984 period, as a second keyboardist.

== Background ==
Since Frank Bornemann decided to break up Eloy in 1998, he focused on his career as a record producer in his own Horus Sound Studios, as well as a promoter on his own Artist Station Records. The rest of Eloy went their own way in the music business, some of them moved to different cities, and communication between them was sporadic for the next decade.

When Bornemann decided in 2008 to create a new Eloy album, he had no plans of touring to support it. Each band member could just record their individual music parts separately, in some cases without even traveling to Bornemann's studios in Hanover. This led to the album being recorded in three different studios, two of them located in Hanover and one in Stuttgart.

All 1998 Eloy members agreed to be part of the new album, but since they were already working on other projects, Bornemann had to invite several guest musicians to record additional parts and finish the album within schedule.

As indicated by its title, the song "The Challenge (Time to Turn, Part 2)" is a sequel to the eponymous track from the 1982 Eloy album Time to Turn.

== Reception ==
The album received universal praise by critics, who thought of it as a worthy addition to Eloy's legacy.

Alex Henderson from Allmusic named Visionary as "one of Eloy's more consistent efforts", while Kostas Sakkalis wrote on Rocking.gr that "when you have 17 albums on your catalog, originality is not your first priority. Inspiration, hunger, and musical identity are, and we find those generously on Visionary". Sea of Tranqulity's Pete Pardo believes that the album is "a welcome return for one of the most beloved prog bands of all time".

== Track listing ==
All songs written by Frank Bornemann

No.	Title	Length
1.	"The Refuge"	4:54
2.	"The Secret"	7:45
3.	"Age of Insanity"	7:56
4.	"The Challenge (Time to Turn, Part 2)"	6:44
5.	"Summernight Symphony"	4:22
6.	"Mystery (The Secret, Part 2)"	9:00
7.	"Thoughts"	1:22
8.	"The Making of Visionary" (video documentary)	12:00
Total length:		54:03

== Personnel ==
All information according to the album's liner notes, numbers in parentheses indicate specific tracks.

Eloy

- Frank Bornemann: lead vocals, backing vocals, acoustic guitar, electric guitar
- Klaus-Peter Matziol: bass
- Michael Gerlach: keyboards
- Bodo Schopf: drums, percussion
- Hannes Folberth: additional keyboards (2, 3, 4, 6)

Guest musicians

- Anke Renner: vocals (2, 4, 5, 6)
- Bettina Lux: vocals (2, 4, 6)
- Volker Kuinke: renaissance flute (1, 2)
- Christof Littmann: keyboards, orchestra sounds (5)
- Stephan Emig: additional percussion (4, 6)

Production

- Frank Bornemann: arrangement, production, mixing, sound design, pre-mastering
- Timo Soist: engineering, mixing
- Michael Krzizek: additional recordings, sound design, pre-mastering, mastering
- Arne Neurand: additional recordings, mixing
- Benjamin Schäfer: additional recordings, mixing
- Emanuel Klempa: additional recordings
- Michael Gerlach: additional recordings
- Bodo Schopf: recording of his own parts
- Christof Littmann: recording of his own parts

Artwork

- Michael Narten: graphic design
