= Colours (Eloy album) =

Studio album by Eloy
- Released: June 1980
- Recorded: Spring 1980
- Studio: Horus Sound Studio, Hannover, Germany
- Genre: Space rock, progressive rock
- Length: 39:33
- Label: Harvest / EMI Electrola
- Producer: Eloy

Eloy chronology
Silent Cries and Mighty Echoes (1979)	Colours (1980)	Planets (1981)

Singles from Colours
- 1. "Silhouette (single edit) / Horizons" Released: 1980

Audio sample
- "Horizons": file; help

Professional ratings
Review scores
Source	Rating
ArtRock	9/10 stars

Colours is the eighth studio album by the German rock band Eloy, released in 1980.

It was the first non-concept Eloy album since Floating (1974), and the first to be supported by a single and two music videos.

Since the prior year's Silent Cries and Mighty Echoes, Eloy had added guitarist Hannes Arkona to their lineup, while also replacing keyboardist Detlev Schmidtchen and drummer Jürgen Rosenthal with Hannes Folberth and Jim McGillivray.

Songs "Silhouette" and "Horizons" were released as a single, while music videos were made for "Silhouette" and "Illuminations".

== Background ==
During the autumn of 1979, Hannes Arkona joined Eloy as a touring member, a second guitarist along the band's leader Frank Bornemann. As personal tensions led to the departure of Detlev Schmidtchen and Jürgen Rosenthal, Bornemann decided to make Arkona a full-time member, and with the addition of Hannes Folberth and Jim McGillivray, the new Eloy lineup was completed by the spring of 1980. Frank Bornemann also created his own Horus Sound Studio in Hannover at the beginning of that year, which served as the band's new "base".

Amidst those changes, the release of the next album and the following supporting tour was already scheduled for the autumn of 1980, thus new music had to be written in a very tight schedule. With no time to create yet another concept album, Eloy chose shorter and tighter song forms, toning down the prog rock element. They also decided to use "Child Migration", an unreleased single from 1979, which they heavily altered and re-recorded.

== Reception ==
Shortly after its release, Colours entered the German charts. It charted for 17 weeks straight (June–October 1980), peaking at the 28th position. Its charting duration was a new record for Eloy at the time, surpassing the previous year's Silent Cries and Mighty Echoes, which had charted for 14 weeks straight.

Music press was positive towards Eloy for the first time, but the album sold fewer copies than the previous three, and the supportive tour that followed was less successful, too. Songs from Colours were fairly well received by the live crowds, but older songs like "The Apocalypse" or "Poseidon's Creation" certainly made fans more enthusiastic. Convinced to follow the fans' will and not the music press' opinion, Bornemann decided to switch back to the concept album norm that made Eloy successful, this time in a more emphatic and grandiose way than ever before: a double concept album, comprising from Planets and Time to Turn.

== Track listing ==
Music by Eloy and lyrics by Jim McGillivray, except where noted.

No.	Title	Lyrics	Length
1.	"Horizons"		3:20
2.	"Illuminations"		6:19
3.	"Giant"	Sonja Brown	6:05
4.	"Impressions"	Sonja Brown	3:06
5.	"Child Migration"		7:23
6.	"Gallery"		3:08
7.	"Silhouette"		6:57
8.	"Sunset"		3:15
Total length:			39:33

2005 Remastered CD reissue bonus tracks
No.	Title	Length
9.	"Wings of Vision" (1980 A-Side single)	4:14
10.	"Silhouette (single edit)" (1980 A-Side single)	3:30

== Personnel ==
All information according to the album's liner notes.

Eloy

- Frank Bornemann: guitars, lead vocals on tracks 2–8
- Hannes Arkona: guitars
- Klaus-Peter Matziol: bass, vocals
- Hannes Folberth: keyboards
- Jim McGillivray: drums, percussion

Additional musicians

- Edna and Sabine Matziol: lead vocals on track 1

Production

- Eloy: arrangement, production
- Jan Nemec: engineering, recording, mixing

Artwork

- Winfried Reinbacher: painting

== Charts ==
Chart (1980)	Peak position
German Albums (Offizielle Top 100)	28
