= Visionary (disambiguation) =

A visionary is one who experiences a supernatural vision or apparition.

Visionary may also refer to:

== Media ==
- "Visionary" (Star Trek: Deep Space Nine), episode of the television series Star Trek: Deep Space Nine
- Visionary (Gordon Giltrap album), 1976
- Visionary (Eloy album), 2009
- Visionary (Farruko album), 2015
- Visionary: The Video Singles, box set by Michael Jackson
- Visionary, the fifth studio album by Farruko
- Smasher (Image Comics), a comic book superhero originally known as Visionary

== Business ==
- Visionary Entertainment Studios Inc, American roleplaying games company
- Chief visionary officer, a function within a company

== See also ==
- Visionaries (disambiguation)
