= Visionaries =

Visionaries may refer to:

- Visionary, one who can see the future
- Visionaries (hip-hop group), a hip hop group from Los Angeles
- Visionaries: Knights of the Magical Light, an American media franchise marketed in the late 1980s
- Visionaries: Small Solutions to Enormously Large Problems, an Australian documentary film series broadcast in 1989, 1990, and 1993
- Visionaries with Antanas Mockus, a Colombian political party
- The Visionaries (film), a 1969 Italian film
- Visionaries (2001 film), a Spanish romantic and religious drama film

== See also ==
- Visionary (disambiguation)
