= Liar (band) =

British rock band

Liar were a UK band formed in 1975. They released two albums, Straight from the Hip and Set the World on Fire and two singles, and toured internationally. A third album was recorded in Los Angeles but never released.

== History ==
Liar was formed in 1975 in Maidenhead in Berkshire by Dave Taylor formerly of Edison Lighthouse. In 1976, the band came to the attention of Chris Demetriou, a freelance producer and A&R man for Decca Records. Demetriou took the band into Decca's West Hampstead studios, inviting singer/guitarist Paul Travis, with whom he had worked before, to sit in with them to help with song arrangements and also to provide a channel of communication between studio and control room. Following various personnel changes, the line-up for the first album, Straight from the Hip, comprised David Burton (lead vocals and guitar), Dave Taylor (formerly of Catapilla; bass and vocals), Paul Travis (guitar and vocals) and Clive Brooks (previously of Egg and The Groundhogs; drums). Lead guitar was provided on a session basis by Geoff Whitehorn, then working with Crawler, although at the time of the album's release this role had been filled by Steve Mann, subsequently with Lionheart, MSG and Sweet, who completed the final line-up. Keyboards on two tracks were by John (Rabbit) Bundrick.

Following the debut album's release in 1977, the band undertook an initial tour of the UK with Slade, followed by two European tours, covering the Netherlands and Germany. A three-week tour of Hungary, sharing the stage with top Hungarian band Piramis, followed, and the final show of this tour in Budapest had an audience of 35,000. A second album was proposed, with production being handed over to John Alcock, who had previously worked with Thin Lizzy among others. Management was taken up by Del Taylor of Delta Artist Management, who also managed Alexis Korner and Jim Diamond. The new album was recorded at The Who's Ramport Studios in Battersea, London.

Feeling that the band would benefit from signing to a more progressive label, manager Taylor arranged a gig at Hatfield University, to which significant figures from the record industry were invited. As a result, the band left Decca and signed to Albert Grossman's Bearsville Records.

The second album was released in 1978, with a single "Set the World on Fire", and following a promotional visit to the US by Burton and Taylor, the band undertook a tour of Yugoslavia in preparation for a nationwide tour of the United States with American band Styx. The album was initially well received in the US; at one point, it was the third most played album in the Billboard airplay charts behind Bob Dylan's Street Legal and The Who's Who Are You. Following heavy airplay, the album entered the album charts, but due to the recording of a new Styx album overrunning, Styx cancelled their planned US tour and airplay for Liar's album soon tailed off and the album left the charts.

A decision was then made by Delta and Bearsville for the band to record another album in California. Thus, in late 1978, the band took up temporary residence in Hollywood and recorded a third album at Stevie Wonder's Crystal Studios in Los Angeles, again produced by John Alcock.

Unfortunately Paul Fishkin, (President of Bearsville Records), who had signed Liar, fell out with Bearsville owner Albert Grossman. Liar's contract with Bearsville guaranteed financial touring support but Grossman refused to support a US tour to promote the new album and talks between Liar's management and Bearsville broke down and a release from their contract with Bearsville was agreed.

The band returned to the UK and undertook a successful sell out tour with UFO, culminating in two nights at the then Hammersmith Odeon. There were negotiations for a new record deal with A&M Records and Chrysalis Records but nothing was signed and Liar folded; the Hammersmith Odeon gig on 16 February 1979 becoming their last.
