= Ocean 2: The Answer =

Studio album by Eloy
- Released: 9 October 1998
- Recorded: August 1997 – July 1998
- Studios: Horus Sound, Hanover; Smecky, Prague (Prague Philharmonic Choir parts)
- Genre: Progressive rock
- Length: 57:46
- Label: GUN / BMG
- Producer: Frank Bornemann

Eloy chronology
The Tides Return Forever (1994)	Ocean 2: The Answer (1998)	Timeless Passages (2003)

Singles from Ocean 2: The Answer
- 1. "The Answer (Radio Edit) / Awakening Of Consciousness (Radio Edit) / Ro Setau (Radio Edit)" Released: 1998

Audio sample
- "The Answer": file; help

Professional ratings
Review scores
Source	Rating
ArtRock	8/10 stars
Aural Innovations	favorable
Progwereld	favorable
Rock Hard	5/10 stars

Ocean 2: The Answer is the sixteenth studio album by the German rock band Eloy, released in 1998.

It is a concept album conceived by Frank Bornemann and inspired by Ocean, the most commercially successful German prog rock album ever. As Bornemann explains, "The question of the meaning of human existence and influences beyond physical perception ultimately became the focus of this conceptual work. I wanted to find the answers to these questions on this album. (...) I am deeply convinced that everything I have formulated on The Answer comes very close to what I subjectively recognize and perceive as reality."

== Synopsis ==
Rendition according to the album's lyrics.

As humanity progresses towards the turn of the millennium, it uncovers deeper truths preserved by its ancestors. This ancient wisdom has the potential to guide and enlighten both individuals and society as a whole, ultimately leading towards a higher goal or state of existence ("Ro Setau"). The present and future seem dystopian, marked by spiritual desolation, societal decay, and technological obsession. Despite this bleak outlook, there is a recurring call to awaken, trust in inner wisdom, and embrace change as humanity stands at a pivotal point in time ("Paralysed Civilization").

In a state of cosmic harmony and inner peace, silence and tranquility play crucial roles in achieving a higher state of consciousness. The alignment of planets, the rise of an emerald aura, and the presence of divine moments all contribute to a sense of oneness with the universe. True understanding and enlightenment come from a serene and clear inner self ("Serenity"). Humanity is engaged in an ongoing quest for understanding and clarity amid the uncertainties and contradictions of life. Awakening of consciousness, balancing logic with intuition, and recognizing the inner light that guides and illuminates the way forward, are essential achievements during that quest ("Awakening of Consciousness").

Life and the universe are infused with a divine, creative force that connects all beings. This deeper spiritual connection leads to the understanding of the self and the cosmos ("Reflections from the Spheres Beyond"). A journey of inner exploration where memories provide comfort, along with mystical, intuitive experiences lead to new discoveries and spiritual insights. The interplay of cosmic and natural imagery underscores a connection to the universe and the timeless nature of these experiences ("Waves of Intuition").

The awakening to higher consciousness is achieved through the interplay of light, sound, and universal forces. Described is a journey of the mind and soul towards unity with the cosmos, breaking through the limitations of time and space to achieve eternal understanding and peace. The powerful natural elements and mystical experiences depicted illustrate the profound transformation and revelation inherent in this spiritual quest ("The Answer").

== Background ==
After the very successful The Tides Return Forever supporting tour in 1994, which coincided with the band's 25th anniversary, Frank Bornemann wanted to disband Eloy, thinking of it as a worthy conclusion.

The enthusiastic response from the Eloy fans changed his mind, but he was still wondering what he could actually offer to the fans after so many albums. Thinking of Ocean as the pinnacle of Eloy's career, he decided to try to create an album inspired by it, reawakening the musical spirit of the 70s while taking advantage of the productive technical progress of the 90s. Analog recording was utilized in order to achieve the vintage sound they intended.

The 1994 touring drummer Bodo Schopf was appointed as a full-time member during the creation and recording of the album, making Eloy a quartet.

== Artwork ==
The Ocean cover artist Wojciech Siudmak was once again responsible for the artwork, enhancing the connection between the two albums. His "Eternal Love" painting was used as the cover of Ocean 2: The Answer, while "Foetus Metaphysics" and "Reincarnation" were included in the album's booklet. "Reincarnation" was also on the front cover of "The Answer" single.

== Reception ==
The album was very well received, both initially and retrospectively.

Paul Ward of the Aural Innovations magazine wrote in January 1999: "...the album has all the classic Eloy hallmarks. (...) the sounds that they have developed over the last decade have not been forgotten, and listening to the album there is a merging of the old and the new which results in a feeling of completeness". Keith Henderson of the same medium stated that "Ocean 2 is a triumphant return for Eloy".

Art Rock's Paweł Horyszny reviewed the album in 2014, with his opinion being that "Frank Bornemann reached in his own mind and the great historical treasury of this noble band, and instead of wandering around new wave sounds, he treated the fans to a real sentimental journey."

Eloy set out a mini tour in December 1998 to support the album, playing five concerts in Germany, welcomed in a triumphant fashion by their fans. After the tour, Bornemann went ahead with the plan he had in mind since 1994 (see Background) and broke up the band, focusing on his career as a producer. The break up would last ten years, before the late 2008 reunion that led to Visionary.

== Track listing ==
All lyrics by Frank Bornemann, music by Bornemann and Michael Gerlach except where noted.

No.	Title	Music	Length
1.	"Between Future and Past"	Gerlach	2:43
2.	"Ro Setau"	Bornemann	7:09
3.	"Paralysed Civilization"		9:28
4.	"Serenity"	Bornemann, Gerlach, Klaus-Peter Matziol	3:09
5.	"Awakening of Consciousness"		6:03
6.	"Reflections from the Spheres Beyond"		12:59
7.	"Waves of Intuition"	Bornemann, Matziol	4:56
8.	"The Answer"	Bornemann	11:19
Total length:			57:46

== Personnel ==
All information according to the album's liner notes, numbers in parentheses indicate specific tracks.

Eloy

- Frank Bornemann: vocals, guitar
- Michael Gerlach: keyboards
- Klaus-Peter Matziol: bass
- Bodo Schopf: drums, percussion

Guest musicians

- Steve Mann: slide guitar (8)
- Susanne Schätzle & Bettina Lux: backing vocals
- Hannes Folberth: minimoog (2)
- Volker Kuinke: recorder (3, 7, 8)
- Peter Beckett & Tom Jackson: choir (8)
- Daniela Wöhler, Frederike Stübner & Susanne Moldenhauer: soprano voices (8)
- Prague Philharmonic Choir arranged by Peter Beckett, conducted by Pavel Kühn, and organized by Petr Bělohlávek (8)

Production

- Frank Bornemann: production
- Gerhard Wölfle: engineering, mixing
- Hans Jörg Maucksch: mastering
- Juraj Durovic: engineering for the Prague Philharmonic Choir

Artwork

- Wojciech Siudmak: paintings
- Michael Narten: graphic design, digital illustration, photography
- Thomas Möller: digital illustration
- Volker Kuinke: photography
- Günter Stierkat: photography
