= Steve Mann (English musician) =

English musician and producer (born 1956)

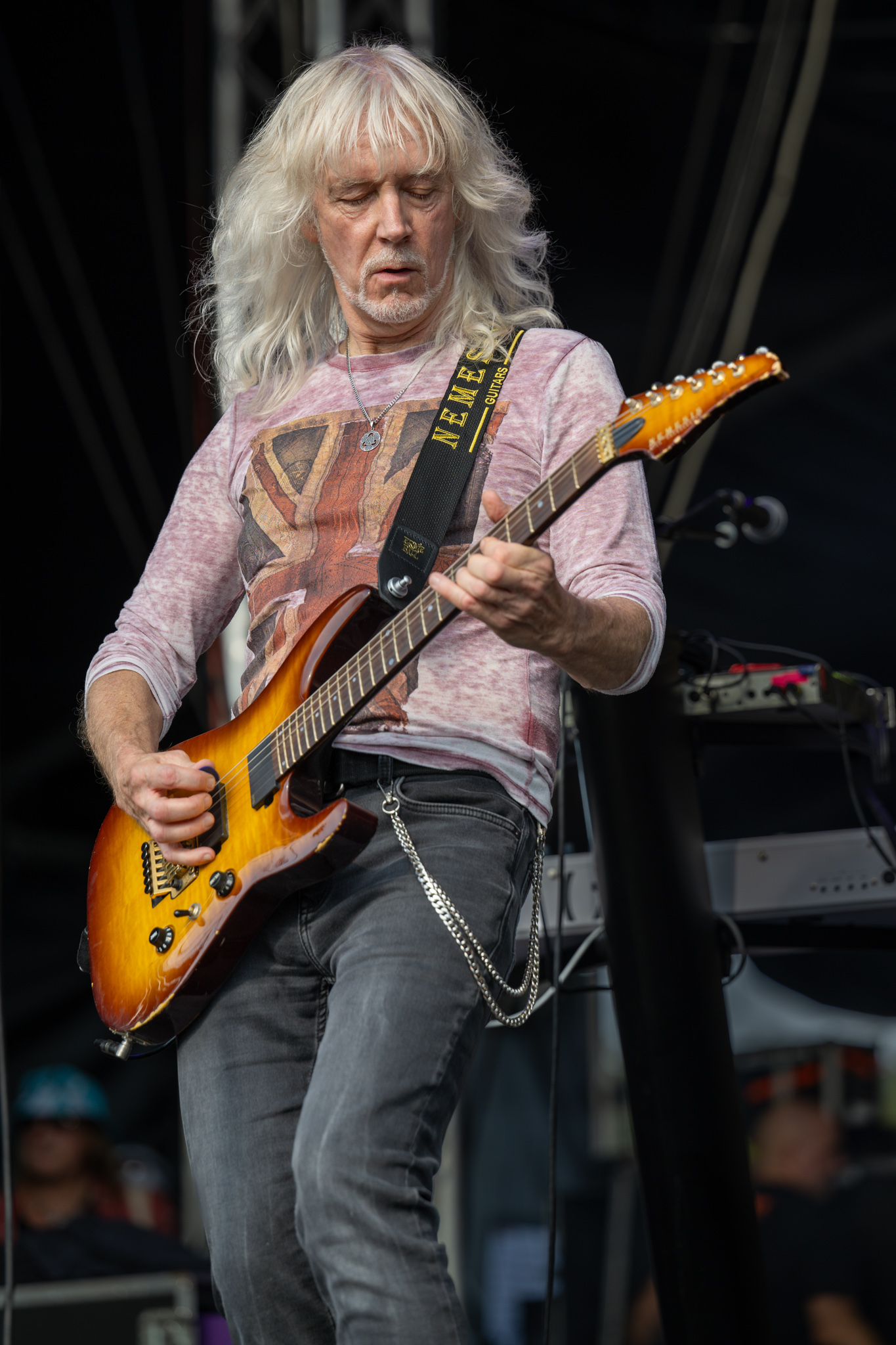
- Mann performing with the Michael Schenker Group in 2025

Background information
- Born: August 9, 1956 (age 70); London, England
- Genres: Hard rock; heavy metal; progressive rock
- Occupations: Musician; producer; composer
- Instruments: Guitar; keyboards; backing vocals
- Years active: 1974–present
- Member of: Michael Schenker Group; Lionheart; McAuley–Mann
- Formerly of: McAuley Schenker Group; Michael Schenker Fest; Andy Scott's Sweet; Liar; Eloy

Steve Mann (born 9 August 1956 in London) is an English guitarist, keyboardist, record producer and engineer, best known as a member of Andy Scott's Sweet from 1989 to 1995 and as a member of many bands by German guitarist Michael Schenker.

== Career ==
=== Early career ===
Mann began taking classical piano lessons at the age of 7 and continued until he was 15, when, he bought his first electric guitar. He grew up in a musical family with his father playing Hawaiian guitar and his mother and brother, Dave, both playing piano. While still at school (Drayton Manor Grammar School in Hanwell, West London) he was a member of bands Heavy Water and Blind Eye and just before heading off to university he joined Fast Buck with Charlie Harper (who later formed punk rockers UK Subs) and Scott Gorham (shortly before he joined Thin Lizzy). After university he took up classical guitar, studying at the John Williams School in London. He also auditioned for the Deep Purple spin-off band Paice Ashton Lord (with Ian Paice, Tony Ashton and Jon Lord) but the position went to Bernie Marsden.

Mann joined his first professional band, Liar, in 1977 who later opened for UFO, although after Michael Schenker's departure. Three years later, Mann joined Lionheart with former members of Tygers of Pan Tang, Iron Maiden, Def Leppard and Judas Priest. Their first album, Hot Tonight, was released in 1984, but the group disbanded after several line-up changes and problems with the label.

During his time with Lionheart he was also a member of NWoBHM band Tytan.

=== McAuley Schenker and Sweet ===
Mann, joined McAuley Schenker Group, as keyboardist and guitarist, alongside Lionheart bassist Rocky Newton, in 1986 but later left in mid 1987 to work with NWoBHM band Saxon, he was replaced by guitarist Mitch Perry. Mann later returned to the band in 1988 and contributed to the highly successful albums Perfect Timing in 1987 and Save Yourself in 1989. The latter, recorded in Los Angeles, spawned the US number 5 hit single ‘Anytime,’ written by Mann and Robin McAuley.

After the group split in the early 90s, Mann established his Frida Park Studio in Hannover. Over the following years, he honed his producer and studio engineer skills. He also spent several years as keyboardist and guitarist of the legendary British glam rockers Sweet and played several tours with the German progressive rock band, Eloy.

=== Later career ===
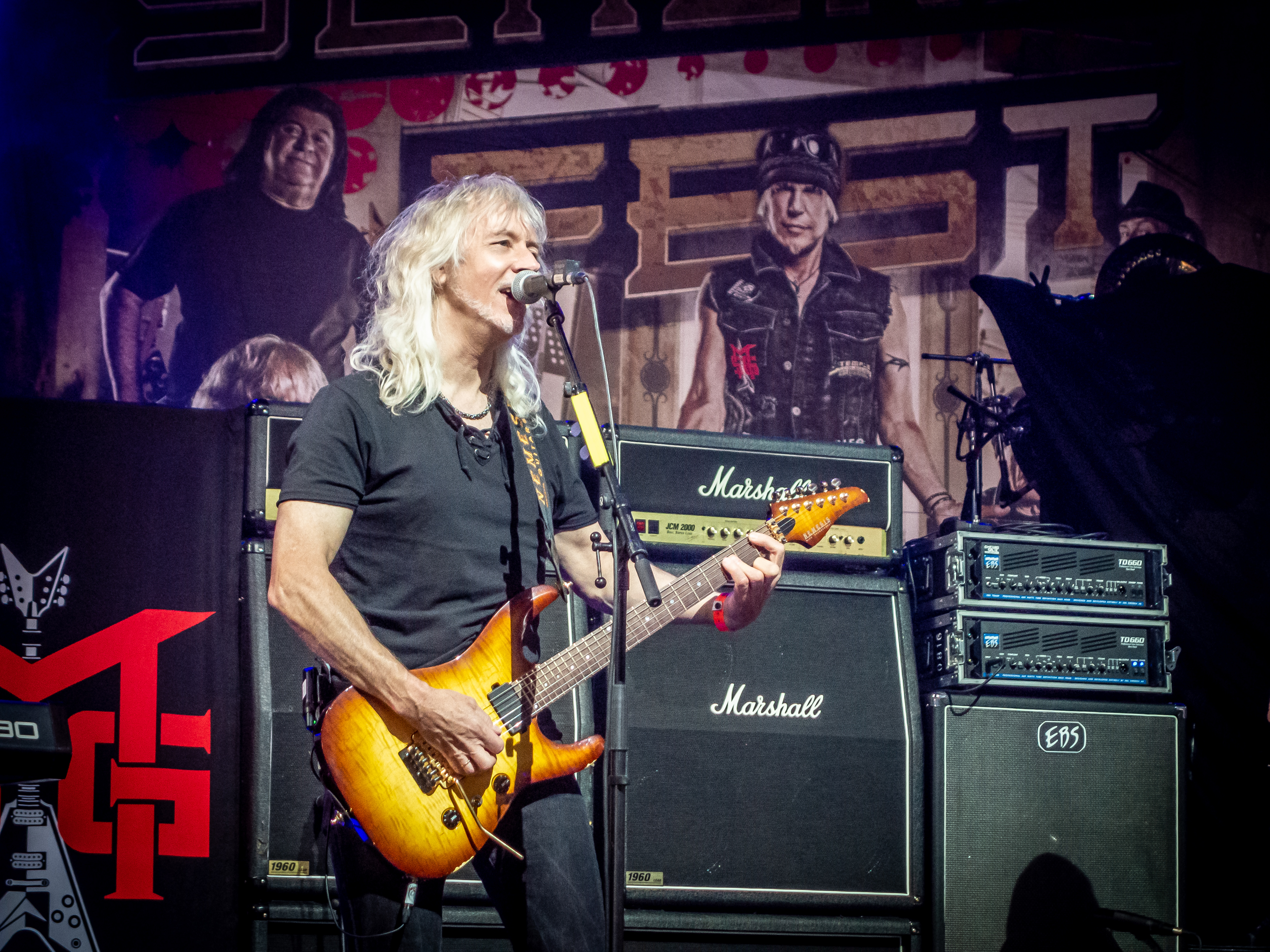
Mann performing with Michael Schenker Fest in 2019.

In 1998 Mann moved back to England where he took up work as an audio engineer at Channel 4 Television in London. This ran until 2004 at which point he moved back to Hannover and continued with his production and engineering exploits along with some coding work.

Mann has continued his work as a musician, producer, and studio engineer. Lionheart reunited in 2016, featuring the original members Mann, Newton and Dennis Stratton, and new members vocalist Lee Small (ex-Shy) and Mann's longtime friend, drummer Clive Edwards (ex-UFO and Uli Jon Roth) who played with the band briefly in the 1980s. The renewed band has since released three studio albums, Second Nature (2017), The Reality of Miracles (2020) and The Grace Of A Dragonfly (2024).

In 2016 Mann also re-joined Michael Schenker, replacing longtime keyboardist and guitarist Wayne Findlay. Schenker was putting together a new band, Michael Schenker Fest, consisting of only the members of his past bands, at points the band included vocalists Gary Barden, Graham Bonnet, Robin McAuley, Leif Sundin and Doogie White, Mann on keyboards, guitar and backing vocals, Chris Glen on bass and backing vocals and drummers Simon Phillips, Bodo Schopf and the late Ted McKenna.

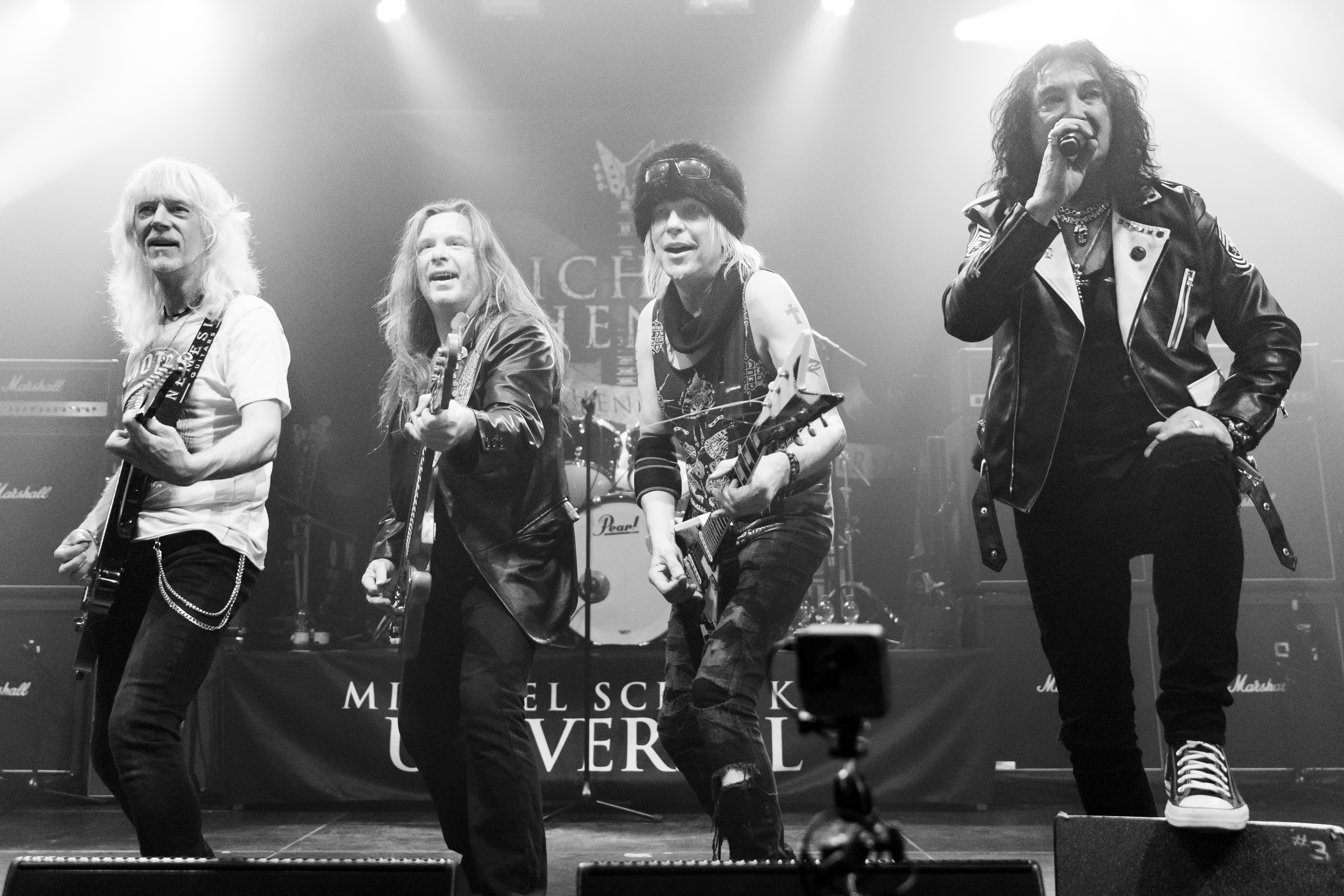
Mann (left) performing with MSG in 2022.

Mann is currently a part of the Michael Schenker Group with the eponymous Schenker as well as vocalist Robin McAuley, bassist Barend Courbois (ex-Blind Guardian) and Bodo Schopf (ex-Sweet), former members include bassist Barry Sparks and vocalist Ronnie Romero. He is also part of a project with McAuley, dubbed McAuley-Mann, who are expected to release an album.

Since 2019, Mann has made regular appearances on guitar/keyboards with The Sweet, following the exit of Tony O'Hora. He has alternated duties with Tom Cory and sometime performs alongside him.

== Discography ==
=== Solo releases ===
- Is Anybody Listening (with Chris Ousey)

=== As band member ===
==== With Liar ====
- Straight From The Hip (1977)
- Set The World On Fire (1978)
- Blame It On The Kids (1979)
- Sunset Plaza Drive (2020)

==== With Lionheart ====
- Hot Tonight (1984)
- Unearthed – Raiders of the Lost Archives (1999)
- Second Nature (2017)
- The Reality of Miracles (2020)

==== With Tytan ====
- Rough Justice (1985)

==== With Michael Schenker ====
- Perfect Timing (1987)
- Save Yourself (1989)
- M.S.G. (1991) one track
- Live: Tokyo International Forum Hall A (2017)
- Resurrection (2018)
- Revelation (2019)
- Immortal (2021)
- Universal (2022)
- Don´t sell your Soul (2025)

==== With Andy Scott's Sweet ====
- A (1992)
- The Answer (1995)
- Isolation Boulevard (2020) guest appearance on one track

=== Others appearances ===
Year	Artist	Title	Notes
1986	Lovelight	Activate	Lead guitar on unspecified tracks
1988	Saxon	Destiny	Backing vocals on unspecified tracks
1990	Rough Silk	Demo '90 - Ups And Downs	Production
1991	Letter X	Time Of The Gathering	Backing vocals, production and engineering
1991	Sargant Fury	Still Want More	Backing vocals on unspecified tracks
1992	Letter X	Born Into Darkness	Guitars, keyboards and choirs engineer
1992	True Brits	Ready To Rumble	Keyboards on "It Ain't Over Till It's Over" with members of Iron Maiden, MSG, Saxon, Samson, Tank, The Damned and The Sweet
1992	Suckspeed	End Of Depression	engineering
1993	Operating Strategies	The Waters & The Wild	engineering, mixing and electric guitar on unspecified tracks
1993	Boogeyman	Who's Afraid?	engineering and mixing
1994	Thunderhead	Classic Killers Live!	Producer
1994	Mad Jac	Who's Mad ?	Co-producer and mixing
1994	Eloy	The Tides Return Forever	acoustic guitar solo on "The Tides Return Forever"
1997	Cholane	Black Box	engineering and mixing
1998	Eloy	Ocean 2: The Answer	slide guitar on "The Answer"
2000	Praying Mantis	Nowhere To Hide	mixing, mastering and production
2003	Eloy	Timeless Passages	guitar on "Poseidon's Creation" (live in Munich, 1994)
2011	Steve Swindells	The Lost Albums	Guitar on disc one
2012	Osssy	Serum	Guitar on two tracks, also assistant mixing
2014	Eloy	Reincarnation on Stage	guitar
2014	House Of X	House Of X	production and mixing
2014	Albert Lee	Highwayman	additional instruments, production and mixing
2015	Jeff Brown	Slipping Away	guitar solo on one track
2020	Alcatrazz	Born Innocent	guest brass on one track
2022	Circle Of Friends	The Garden	keyboards and lead guitar on unspecified tracks
2023	Gabrielle de Val	Kiss In A Dragon Night	keyboards on unspecified tracks
