= Wojciech Siudmak =

Polish painter (born 1942)

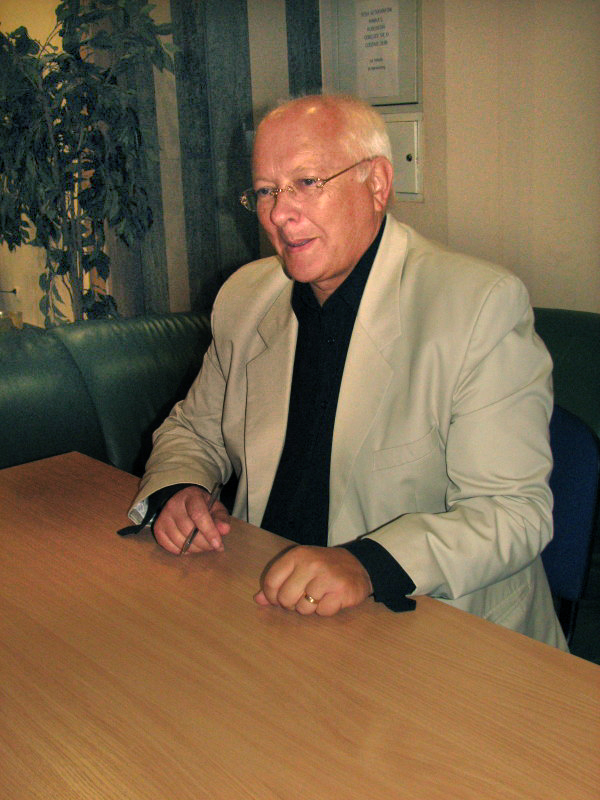
Wojciech Siudmak at Polcon 2007

Wojciech Kazimierz "Wojtek" Siudmak (pronounced: [ˈvɔjt͡ɕɛx ˈɕudmak]; born 10 October 1942 in Wieluń) is a Polish painter and sculptor currently living in France. He was a student at Academy of Fine Arts in Warsaw. In 1966, he moved to France where he studied at the Beaux-Arts de Paris. His works are often used as illustrations for science fiction and fantasy literature, including the Polish edition of Frank Herbert's Dune series. He is also known for his work on album covers, including the award-winning cover for Eloy's 1977 album Ocean. Siudmak painted in 1985 a picture Ethernal Love, he continues the subject e.g. in the form of monuments.

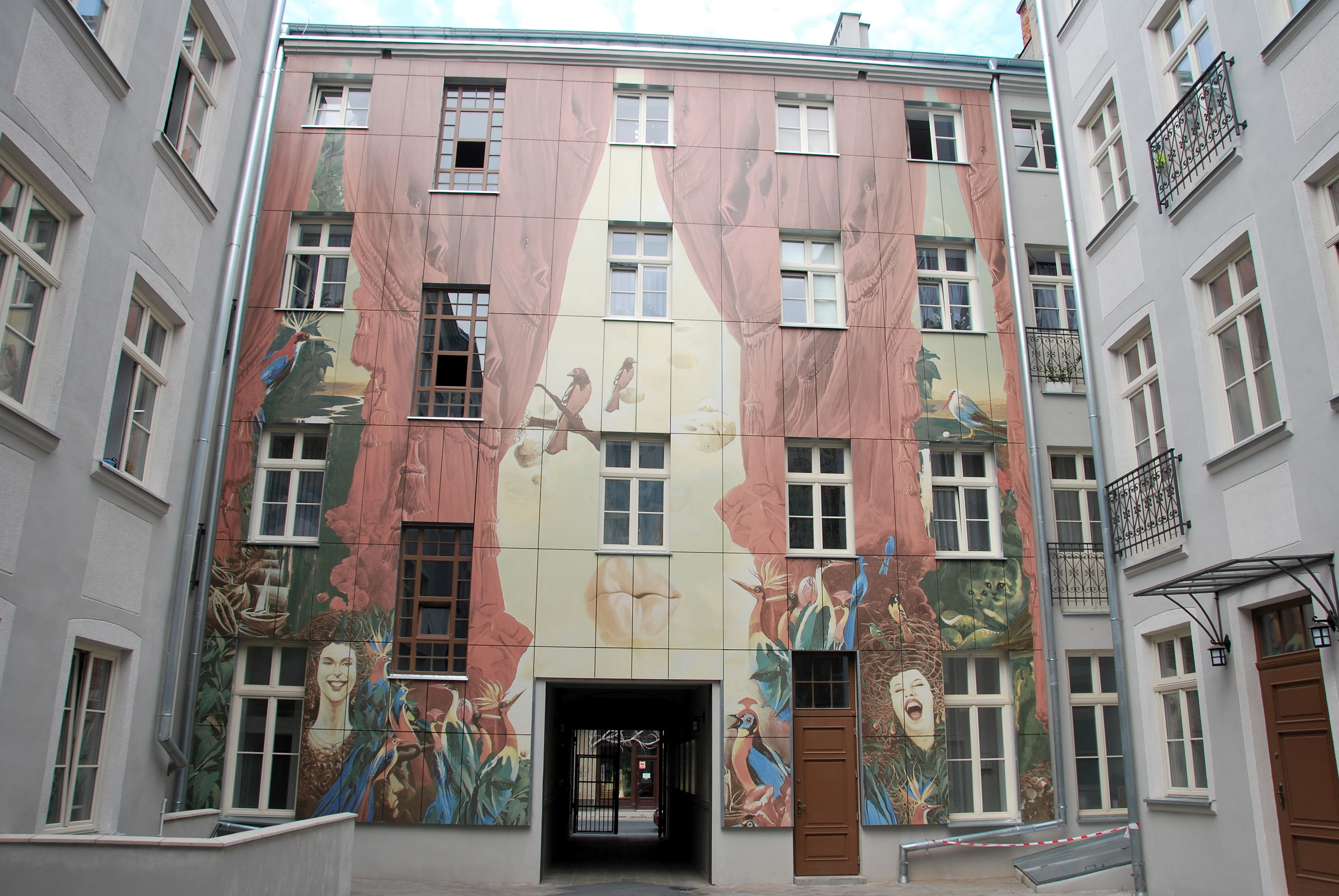
Siudmak's mural in Łódź

Denis Villeneuve, the director of Dune and Dune: Part Two, revealed he had been inspired by Siudmiak's works describing them as "powerfully hypnotic" and "captivating the viewers with their profundity".

== Inspirations ==
Wojciech Siudmak was born in Wieluń, destroyed by bombing during World War II, in which his elder brothers were wounded. Siudmak remembers the despair and ugliness of the destroyed town. He wants to memorize the tragedy of 1939.

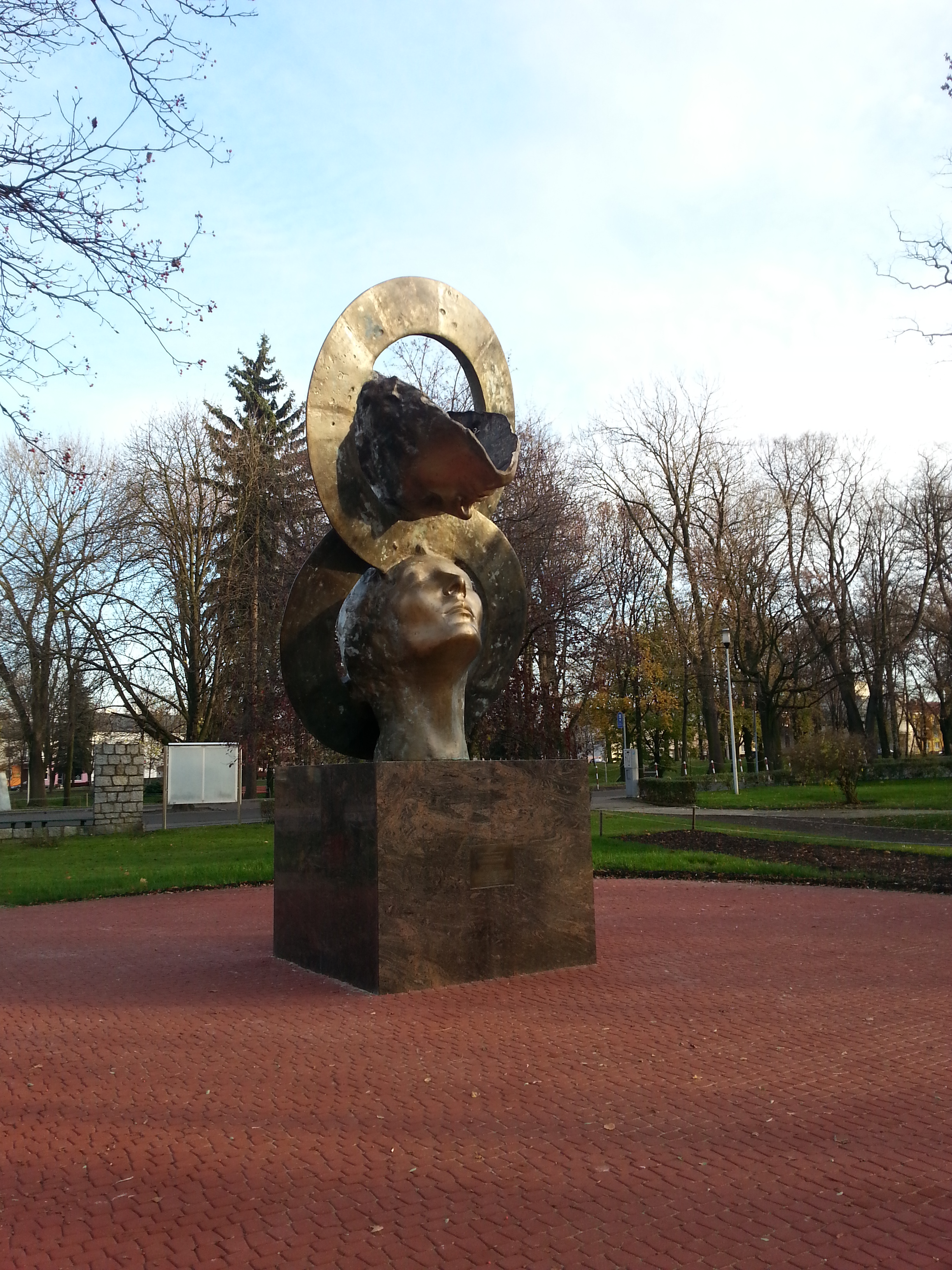
Eternal Love monument in Wieluń

== See also ==
- List of Polish painters

== Literature ==
- Siudmak (in English, French, and Polish). Poznań: REBIS. 2015. ISBN 978-83-7510-764-7.
