= Silent Cries and Mighty Echoes =

Studio album by Eloy
- Released: 10 January 1979
- Recorded: November–December 1978
- Studios: Sound Studio N, Cologne, Germany
- Genres: Progressive rock, space rock
- Length: 43:26
- Label: Harvest / EMI Electrola
- Producer: Eloy

Eloy chronology
Live (1978)	Silent Cries and Mighty Echoes (1979)	Colours (1980)

Audio sample
- "Mighty Echoes": file; help

Professional ratings
Review scores
Source	Rating
ArtRock	10/10 stars
Only Solitaire	2.5/5 stars

Silent Cries and Mighty Echoes is the seventh studio album by the German rock band Eloy, released in 1979.

It is a concept album written by Jürgen Rosenthal, dealing with the transcendence of human existence through spirituality.

It is also the third and last studio album to feature the renowned Eloy line-up of Frank Bornemann, Detlev Schmidtchen, Klaus-Peter Matziol and Jürgen Rosenthal, as Schmidtchen and Rosenthal left the band in the autumn of 1979.

== Synopsis ==
Rendition according to the album's lyrics

An omnipresent force is presented as part of and guide for humanity. As the protagonist experiences moments of empowerment and also humility, he is highlighting the fleeting nature of human life ("Master of Sensation"). He then shifts from a state of comfort to a confrontation with reality, beginning a journey into new levels of knowledge and self-awareness ("Silent Cries Divide the Nights"). Through that process, he realizes the apocalyptic destruction caused when people empower phony masters, with the hope that such destruction will harm humanity only physically, while its spirit will transcend ("The Vision-Burning").

In a more optimistic vibe, the protagonist suggests that distractions and ignorance can lead one astray, but through introspection, love, and truth, one can find the light and wisdom within themselves ("Pilot to Paradise"). He then follows this path himself, in a journey from deep suffering and isolation to a state of profound spiritual awakening and eternal unity with a divine spirit ("De Labore Solis"). Finally, he highlights the interconnectedness of all things and emphasizes the importance of love and understanding in fulfilling our purpose. The "echoes" symbolize the enduring impact of our actions and the necessity of aligning with divine forces and love to achieve enlightenment and harmony. Βy understanding and embracing our mission to spread love, we can transform suffering and elevate our collective consciousness ("Mighty Echoes").

== Background ==
Ocean and its supportive tour were met with enthusiasm by the fans, but the music press was critical of Eloy, which created tensions within the band. In order to concentrate in creating a worthy successor, Eloy isolated in Normandy. Satisfied with the musical result, Eloy set tensions aside and went back to Cologne to record the material and shape their new album. As Jürgen Rosenthal began writing lyrics and presenting them to the band, Frank Bornemann expressed his dissatisfaction against the dark themes Rosenthal chose to utilize, and proposed a more positive approach which was realized in the song "Pilot to Paradise", with its lyrical theme being a Bornemann idea.

The album's release was met with commercial success (see Reception), but music press was once again hostile, renewing tensions within the band. As 1979 was the International Year of the Child, Eloy decided to contribute to the cause by releasing a single with two songs, "Child Migration" and "Let the Sun Rise In My Brain". Dissatisfied with the recordings, they decided to keep the tracks unreleased, with a heavily alternated version of "Child Migration" eventually included in next year's Colours album. Both songs were released for the first time in 2005, as bonus tracks for the remastered CD reissue of Silent Cries and Mighty Echoes. Detlev Schmidtchen and Jürgen Rosenthal slowly distanced themselves from the band during 1979, and in the autumn of that year they decided to leave Eloy and concentrate on their own project, under the name Ego On The Rocks.

== Music ==
According to Vlad Nichols of Ultimate Guitar: "Throughout the album's five tracks, Bornemann gradually builds up tension by painting layered, polychromatic landscapes of cosmic nebulas, only to deliver a cathartic release through the album's final two mellow tracks, 'De Labore Solis' and 'Mighty Echoes.'"

== Reception ==
Shortly after its release, Silent Cries and Mighty Echoes entered the German charts. It charted for 14 weeks straight (February–June 1979), peaking at the 17th position. Both its charting duration and its peaking position were unsurpassed accomplishments for Eloy at the time. In May 1979 it also entered the Norwegian charts for one week, peaking at the 18th position. It was the first time an Eloy album charted in a foreign country.

The supporting live tour began on 1 March 1979 to an enthusiastic response from the fans. The tour's highlight was a sold-out co-headlining concert with Scorpions, who were also touring to support Lovedrive, in the Cologne Sporthalle, on 19 March 1979.

In 2022, the Greek edition of Metal Hammer magazine chose Silent Cries and Mighty Echoes as one of 1979's most influential albums for the development of heavy metal music.

== Track listing ==
Music by Eloy, lyrics by Jürgen Rosenthal. "The Vision" vocals melody written and arranged by Wolfgang Maus.

No.	Title	Length
1.	"a) Astral Entrance" (3:03) "b) Master of Sensation" (6:00)	9:03
2.	"The Apocalypse" a) "Silent Cries Divide the Night" (4:17) b) "The Vision-Burning" (7:15) c) "Force Majeure" (3:22)	14:54
3.	"Pilot to Paradise"	7:01
4.	"De Labore Solis"	5:12
5.	"Mighty Echoes"	7:16
Total length:		43:26

2005 Remastered CD reissue bonus tracks
No.	Title	Length
6.	"Child Migration" (original version, previously unreleased)	4:05
7.	"Let the Sun Rise In My Brain" (previously unreleased)	3:29

== Personnel ==
Eloy

- Frank Bornemann: guitars, lead vocals
- Klaus-Peter Matziol: bass, vocals
- Detlev Schmidtchen: Hammond organ, Minimoog, ARP synthesizers, Solina String Ensemble, Mellotron, RMI keyboard computer, xylophone, angelic voices
- Jürgen Rosenthal: drums, timbales, rototom, temple blocks, timpani, tubular bells, Morse key, triangle, flute, voice

Additional musician

- Brigitte Witt: vocals on "The Vision"

Production

- Eloy: arrangement, production
- Georgi Nedeltschev: engineering, recording, mixing
- Günther Kasper: recording
- Wolfgang Thierbach: additional mixing

Artwork

- Winfried Reinbacher: painting

== Charts ==
Chart (1979)	Peak position
German Albums (Offizielle Top 100)	17
Norwegian Albums (VG-lista)	18
