= Floating (Eloy album) =

Studio album by Eloy
- Released: 11 October 1974
- Recorded: January – May 1974
- Studio: EMI Electrola Studios, Cologne, Germany
- Genre: Progressive rock, krautrock
- Length: 40:17
- Label: Harvest
- Producer: Eloy

Eloy chronology
Inside (1973)	Floating (1974)	Power and the Passion (1975)

Alternative cover
- 2000 remastered CD reissue cover

Audio sample
- "Floating": file; help

Professional ratings
Review scores
Source	Rating
Allmusic	3/5 stars
Only Solitaire	7/15 stars
Progwereld	favorable
Rockmachine	favorable

Floating is the third studio album by German rock band Eloy, released in 1974.

This is Eloy's first album to feature bassist Luitjen Janssen, replacing Wolfgang Stöcker. During the album's composition, the four members of the band decided to rent an apartment together, in order to rehearse more regularly and achieve better cohesion. The band's leader Frank Bornemann took it upon himself to write the album's lyrics, but with the help of Eloy's old member Erich Schriever, and EMI Electrola producer Richard Smith, who is credited under the alias "Gordon Bennit".

Floating received polarizing retrospective reviews; George Starostin believes that the album "is a failure and shows Eloy already running out of steam", while Allmusic's François Couture considers it to be "their first artistic peak" and Greek music journalist Alexandros Richardos thinks "it might be their highest quality album".

== Track listing ==
All music by Eloy, lyrics as noted

No.	Title	Lyrics	Length
1.	"Floating"	Frank Bornemann	3:59
2.	"The Light From Deep Darkness"	Frank Bornemann, Erich Schriever	14:37
3.	"Castle In The Air"	Frank Bornemann, Erich Schriever	7:13
4.	"Plastic Girl"	Frank Bornemann, Erich Schriever	9:05
5.	"Madhouse"	Gordon Bennit	5:16
Total length:			40:17

2000 Remastered CD reissue bonus tracks
No.	Title	Original Album	Length
6.	"Future City" (live in Krefeld, September 1973)	Inside	4:59
7.	"Castle In The Air" (live in Krefeld, September 1973)	Floating	8:08
8.	"Flying High" (live in Krefeld, September 1973)	previously unreleased	3:30

== Personnel ==
Eloy

- Frank Bornemann: guitar, vocals
- Manfred Wieczorke: organ, guitar
- Luitjen Janssen: bass
- Fritz Randow: drums, percussion

Production

- Eloy: production
- Wolfgang Thierbach: engineering
- Helmut Rüßmann: engineering

Artwork

- Jacques Wyrs: painting
- Roberto Patelli: design
