= Planets (Eloy album) =

Studio album by Eloy
- Released: June 1981
- Recorded: 1981
- Studio: Horus Sound Studio, Hanover, Germany
- Genre: Space rock, progressive rock
- Length: 42:01
- Label: Harvest / EMI Electrola (original issue); Heavy Metal Worldwide (1982 UK issue)
- Producer: Eloy

Eloy chronology
Colours (1980)	Planets (1981)	Time to Turn (1982)

Alternative cover
- 1982 UK exclusive cover, designed by Rodney Matthews

Audio sample
- "On the Verge of Darkening Lights": file; help

Professional ratings
Review scores
Source	Rating
ArtRock	7/10 stars
Music Street Journal	favorable

Planets is the ninth studio album by the German rock band Eloy, released in 1981.

It is the first part of a double concept album conceived by Frank Bornemann, with the second part being Time to Turn. It tells the sci-fi story of Ion, an inhabitant of the planet Salta, who tries to fight negative forces in an age of chaos. Salta and Ion represent the Earth and humankind, who must fight to improve its future.

Planets was the first Eloy album to be issued in the United Kingdom in 1982, a year after its initial release, simultaneously with Time to Turn, with alternative artwork designed by Rodney Matthews.

== Background ==
After Colours was considered as a step too far from Eloy's musical identity, the band's leader Frank Bornemann decided to switch back to the concept album norm that made them successful, this time in a more emphatic and grandiose way than ever before: a double concept album, comprising from Planets and Time to Turn.

He wrote a prologue of more than 1,000 words explaining the sci-fi backstory of the album, which was printed on the gatefold along with the lyrics, as a continuous story. Bornemann was heavily influenced from the book Nach uns die Zukunft (After us, the Future) by Hans A. Pestalozzi while conceiving his story, and he arranged two meetings with Pestalozzi during its creation, in order to exchange ideas with him. Due to the complexity of the texts, Bornemann asked for contribution from Sigi Hausen, an American woman with deep knowledge of the German language, with Bornemann writing the story in German and Hausen translating and adapting it in English.

To work better as a unit and write the most cohesive music possible, Eloy rent an apartment together, like they did during the composition of Floating back in 1974. The results were very satisfactory for the group, both in terms of quantity and quality.

With both lyrics and music ready, the band gathered at the Horus Sound Studio to record the album. There, drummer Jim McGillivray often appeared poorly prepared and underperformed. His behavior led to him being expelled from Eloy, with the drums parts still unfinished. The rest of the recording was completed by session drummer Olaf Gustafson.

== Reception ==
Planets was the first Eloy album that did not enter the German charts since Dawn, although its sequel Time to Turn did. The German music press was negative towards it, but the complete Planets/Time to Turn project was very well received in the UK, where both albums were released simultaneously in 1982. Both the British press and fans appreciated the albums; there were even comparisons to Peter Gabriel's work, who was very popular at the time.

== Track listing ==
Music by Eloy, lyrics by Sigi Hausen and Frank Bornemann.

No.	Title	Length
1.	"Introduction"	1:58
2.	"On the Verge of Darkening Lights"	5:37
3.	"Point of No Return"	5:45
4.	"Mysterious Monolith"	7:40
5.	"Queen of the Night"	5:22
6.	"At the Gates of Dawn"	4:17
7.	"Sphinx"	6:50
8.	"Carried by Cosmic Winds"	4:32
Total length:		42:01

2005 Remastered CD reissue bonus track
No.	Title	Length
9.	"On the Verge of Darkening Lights" (live in Paris, France, 1983)	4:09

== Personnel ==
Eloy

- Frank Bornemann: guitars, lead vocals
- Hannes Arkona: guitars, keyboards
- Klaus-Peter Matziol: bass, vocals
- Hannes Folberth: keyboards
- Jim McGillivray: drums, percussion (partial)

Additional musicians

- Olaf Gustafson: drums, percussion as a session musician
- Wolfgang Dyhr: strings conducting and arrangement

Production

- Eloy: arrangement, production
- Jan Nemek: engineering, recording, mixing

Artwork

- Winfried Reinbacher: painting (original issue)
- Rodney Matthews: painting (1982 UK issue)
