= Ocean (Eloy album) =

Studio album by Eloy
- Released: 26 October 1977
- Recorded: September–October 1977
- Studio: Sound Studio N, Cologne, Germany
- Genre: Progressive rock, space rock, krautrock
- Length: 43:53
- Label: Harvest / EMI Electrola
- Producer: Eloy

Eloy chronology
Dawn (1976)	Ocean (1977)	Live (1978)

Unfolded cover
- The album's gatefold unfolded and rotated vertically, to showcase the full painting featured on it

Audio sample
- "Poseidon's Creation": file; help

Professional ratings
Review scores
Source	Rating
AllMusic	4.5/5 stars
ArtRock	8/10 stars
Only Solitaire	10/15 stars

Ocean is the sixth studio album by the German rock band Eloy, released on 26 October 1977.

It is a concept album written by Jürgen Rosenthal, retelling the mythos of Plato's Island of Atlantis, from its creation to its rise, fall, and ultimate destruction, drawing a parallel with humanity's alarming path amidst the Cold War.

Ocean is widely regarded as Eloy's finest work by critics and fans alike, and remains their most commercially successful album. A sequel titled Ocean 2: The Answer was released in 1998.

== Synopsis ==
Gods create the Earth, and Poseidon becomes the master of earthquakes and seas. He is allotted Atlantis as his kingdom, an island of great beauty and wealth, located near the Pillars of Hercules. There, Poseidon builds a temple where he enshrines his sacred laws, and falls in love with the mortal Cleito. Together they have ten demigod sons ("Poseidon's Creation").

In retrospect, the universe was created by the assembly of the gods, and planets were formed in it. By the power of the divine love, humanity was incarnated from clay on Earth. With the proliferation of the human species, begins the strife for the dominance of the strongest, through violence and oppression ("Incarnation of Logos").

As centuries go by, a mortal king gains great power over the four continents, and is consumed by greed and indifference to his people, over which he rules with iron discipline and god-like arrogance. The decay he causes is immense, and people feel betrayed by him ("Decay of Logos").

Gods, frustrated by the events, decide to intervene by destroying humanity. Egyptian deities Hathor and Re, along with Franz Bardon's celestial spirits Emnasut, Gomah, Ebvap, and Aschmunadai, exterminate the sinners with a "divine guided missile". But as Atlantis sank, so it may rise again, if only mankind will be wiser and grasp the insignificance of its existence, which, as it is born in the ocean, so ends up being lost in it ("Atlantis' Agony at June 5th - 8498, 13 P.M. Gregorian Earthtime").^{a}

== Background ==
During the album's creation, Eloy could not find an available studio for their rehearsals in Hanover, and ended up using a modified WWII shelter, with "gloomy, thick walls and musty air". This environment inspired them to create music with a heavier, darker tone than before.

Jürgen Rosenthal wrote the lyrics in complete isolation, and presented them to Frank Bornemann mere minutes before he entered the studio to sing them, on the last day of the recording sessions. Bornemann's task was a very challenging one, and it was his first take that made it to the album. Looking back, Bornemann believes the songs were not fully developed before the album's release, and considers the live renditions from Reincarnation on Stage as superior to the original, showing the true greatness of the compositions.

== Artwork ==
The album cover is based on Wojciech Siudmak's painting "The Tempest", a title derived from the play of the same name by William Shakespeare. The painting also featured as the play's poster when it was performed at the Powszechny Theatre of Warsaw, in 1978.

The gatefold cover of Ocean is printed vertically, in order to showcase the full painting when unfolded. While still folded, it must be based on its spine to display in proper orientation.

== Reception ==
Ocean became the first Eloy album to enter the German charts, in February 1978. It charted for 7 weeks, peaking at the 28th position. In 1995 the album was certified Gold, with sales that exceed 250,000 units in Germany. By 2022, the sales have increased to 350,000, making Ocean the most commercially successful progressive rock album ever in Germany.

In 2022, the Greek edition of Metal Hammer magazine chose Ocean as one of 1977's most influential albums for the development of heavy metal music. The magazine's chief editor Kostas Chronopoulos describes it as "dramatic, cinematic, dreamy, frowning, dark, nothing less than wonderful"

== Track listing ==
Music by Eloy, lyrics by Jürgen Rosenthal

No.	Title	Length
1.	"Poseidon's Creation"	11:38
2.	"Incarnation of Logos"	8:25
3.	"Decay of Logos"	8:15
4.	"Atlantis' Agony at June 5th - 8498, 13 P.M. Gregorian Earthtime^{a}"	15:35
Total length:		43:53

== Personnel ==
All information according to the album's liner notes.

Eloy

- Frank Bornemann: guitars, lead vocals
- Klaus-Peter Matziol: bass, vocals
- Detlev Schmidtchen: Hammond organ, minimoog, ARP synthesizers, Mellotron, RMI keyboard computer, xylophone, angelic voices
- Jürgen Rosenthal: drums, timbales, rototom, temple blocks, kettledrums, tubular bells, Morse key, triangle, flute, paper sounds, voices

Production

- Eloy: arrangement, production
- Georgi Nedeltschev: engineering, mixing tracks 3–4
- Günther "Felix" Beyer: mixing tracks 1–2

Artwork

- Wojtek Siudmak: painting
- Ilse Ruppert: photography

== Charts ==
Chart (1978)	Peak position
German Albums (Offizielle Top 100)	28

== Notes ==
a.The 5th of June, 8498 BC Gregorian Calendar is calculated as the "Day Zero" of the Maya chronology by the German author Otto Muck, in his book Über Alles Atlantis released in 1976.
