= Destination (Eloy album) =

Studio album by Eloy
- Released: 14 May 1992
- Recorded: 1992
- Studios: Horus Sound, Hanover; Michael Gerlach's home studio, Berlin
- Genres: Progressive rock, space rock
- Length: 53:28
- Label: ACI
- Producer: Frank Bornemann

Eloy chronology
Rarities (1991)	Destination (1992)	Chronicles I (1993)

Alternative cover
- 2024 LP reissue cover

Singles from Destination
- 1. "Fire and Ice (radio edit) / Call of the Wild (radio edit) / Prisoner in Mind (radio edit)" Released: 1992

Audio sample
- "Fire and Ice": file; help

Professional ratings
Review scores
Source	Rating
ArtRock	7/10 stars
Rock Hard	8.5/10 stars

Destination is the fourteenth studio album by the German rock band Eloy, released in 1992.

It is an abstract concept album conceived by Frank Bornemann, which deals with the concept of destiny and how much it determines the actions and the general course of people's lives.

Destination is the second album recorded by the Eloy duo line-up of Frank Bornemann and Michael Gerlach, established in 1988 with Ra. It also marked the return of bassist Klaus-Peter Matziol, as a guest musician. Matziol was a full-time Eloy member from 1976 to 1984, before their four-year hiatus.

The album has a heavier sound than previous Eloy recordings, as Bornemann was influenced by the heavy metal bands he worked for as a record producer, in his own Horus Sound Studios.

The painting on the front cover, entitled "Astrologica" and designed by Albert Belasco, depicts the twelve zodiac signs forming the hair of a young woman.

== Track listing ==
Music by Frank Bornemann and Michael Gerlach, lyrics by Bornemann and Diana Baden.

No.	Title	Length
1.	"Call of the Wild"	6:49
2.	"Racing Shadows"	7:11
3.	"Destination"	7:41
4.	"Prisoner in Mind"	4:26
5.	"Silent Revolution"	7:55
6.	"Fire and Ice"	5:10
7.	"Eclipse of Mankind"	6:29
8.	"Jeanne d'Arc"	7:36
Total length:		53:28

== Personnel ==
All information according to the album's liner notes, numbers in parentheses indicate specific tracks.

Eloy

- Frank Bornemann: guitar, vocals
- Michael Gerlach: keyboards

Guest musicians

- Nico Baretta: drums
- Klaus-Peter Matziol: bass (2, 5)
- Detlev Goy: bass (1, 6, 8)
- Helge Engelke: bass (3, 4), rhythm guitar (4), acoustic guitar and guitar solo (6)
- Kai Steffen: guitar solo (5)
- Lenny McDowell: flute (1, 3)
- Classical Choir arranged and conducted by Peter Chrastina (8)

Production

- Frank Bornemann: production
- Gerhard Wölfle: recording, mixing
- Fritz Hilpert: additional vocal recording

Artwork

- Albert Belasco: painting
- Nikolaj Georgiew: black and white photography
- Angela Schwarze (Black Agency): color photography
