= Time to Turn =

Studio album by Eloy
- Released: 6 April 1982
- Recorded: August 1981–February 1982
- Studio: Horus Sound Studio, Hanover, Germany
- Genre: Space rock, progressive rock
- Length: 42:06 (original issue); 43:00 (UK issue)
- Label: Harvest / EMI Electrola (original issue); Heavy Metal Worldwide (UK issue)
- Producer: Eloy

Eloy chronology
Planets (1981)	Time to Turn (1982)	Performance (1983)

Alternative cover
- UK exclusive cover, designed by Rodney Matthews

Singles from Time to Turn
- 1. "Time to Turn / Through a Somber Galaxy" Released: 1982; 2. "Time to Turn / The Flash" Released: 1982

Audio sample
- "Time to Turn": file; help

Professional ratings
Review scores
Source	Rating
ArtRock	6/10 stars
Music Street Journal	favorable

Time to Turn is the tenth studio album by the German rock band Eloy, released in 1982.

It is the second part of a double concept album conceived by Frank Bornemann, with the first part being Planets. It tells the sci-fi story of Ion, an inhabitant of the planet Salta, who tries to fight negative forces in an age of chaos. Salta and Ion represent the Earth and humankind, who must fight to improve its future.

Time to Turn was issued in the United Kingdom with alternative artwork designed by Rodney Matthews and a modified track list, as "Magic Mirrors" was replaced by a remixed version of "Illuminations", originally part of the 1980 album Colours.

It is also the first Eloy album since Power and the Passion to feature drummer Fritz Randow, who returned to replace Jim McGillivray.

== Background ==
For a complete picture of the Planets/Time to Turn concept creation, please read the Background section of Planets first.

Right after Eloy finished the recordings of Planets, they began recording Time to Turn. As Jim McGillivray was expelled from the band during the Planets sessions and Olaf Gustafson was hired to complete the percussion parts, Eloy had to find a new full-time drummer.

The substitute turned out to be the returning Fritz Randow, who left the band in late 1975 after the release of Power and the Passion, when Frank Bornemann temporarily disbanded Eloy.

Bornemann himself was very satisfied with the recordings, but thought of "Magic Mirrors" as a rather weak song compared to the album's standards. As Planets and Time to Turn were about to be released simultaneously in the UK, he chose to replace "Magic Mirrors" with a remixed version of "Illuminations", originally released two years ago with the album Colours.

== Reception ==
Time to Turn entered the German charts on 17 May 1982. It charted for 10 weeks overall, peaking at the 38th position.

The German music press was negative towards it, but the complete Planets/Time to Turn project was very well received in the UK, where both albums were released simultaneously in 1982. Both the British press and fans appreciated the albums; there were even comparisons to Peter Gabriel's work, who was very popular at the time.

The supporting tour was very impressive and satisfying for both the band and the fans from an artistic standpoint, but the attendance was rather disappointing. Frank Bornemann believes that the main reason behind the significant decrease in attendance was the early 1980s recession.

In October 2022 the Time to Turn UK issue artwork was released as a jigsaw puzzle under the Classic Album Art series, which included several rock and heavy metal album covers designed by Rodney Matthews.

== Track listing ==
Music by Eloy and lyrics by Sigi Hausen, except where noted.

Original track list
No.	Title	Length
1.	"Through a Somber Galaxy"	6:00
2.	"Behind the Walls of Imagination"	6:25
3.	"Time to Turn"	4:32
4.	"Magic Mirrors"	5:25
5.	"End of an Odyssey"	9:25
6.	"The Flash"	5:34
7.	"Say, is it Really True"	4:45
Total length:		42:06

UK issue track list
No.	Title	Lyrics	Length
1.	"Through a Somber Galaxy"		6:00
2.	"Behind the Walls of Imagination"		6:25
3.	"Illuminations" (remix, originally from Colours)	Jim McGillivray	6:19
4.	"Time to Turn"		4:32
5.	"End of an Odyssey"		9:25
6.	"The Flash"		5:34
7.	"Say, is it Really True"		4:45
Total length:			43:00

== Personnel ==
Eloy

- Frank Bornemann: guitars, lead vocals
- Hannes Arkona: guitars, keyboards, percussion
- Klaus-Peter Matziol: bass, Moog Taurus
- Hannes Folberth: keyboards
- Fritz Randow: drums

Additional musicians

- Sabine Matziol, Amy, and Anne: vocals on "Time To Turn"

Production

- Eloy: arrangement, production
- Jan Nemek: engineering, recording, mixing
- Thomas Rugel: recording on some of the vocals

Artwork

- Winfried Reinbacher: painting (original issue)
- Rodney Matthews: painting (UK issue)

== Charts ==
Chart (1982)	Peak position
German Albums (Offizielle Top 100)	38
