= Eloy (band) =

German rock band

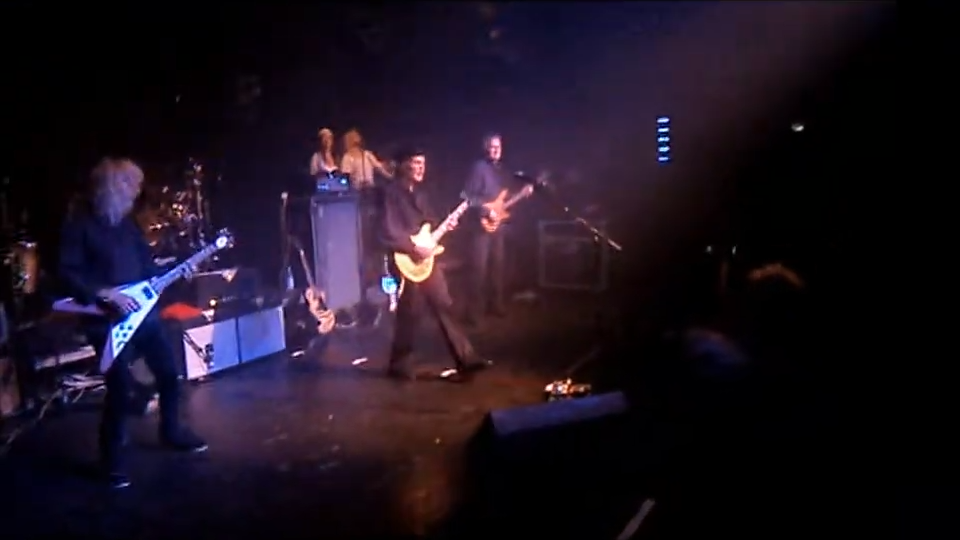
- Eloy performing in 2012

Background information
- Origin: Hannover, West Germany
- Genres: Progressive rock; symphonic rock; space rock; hard rock
- Years active: 1969–1984, 1986–1998, 2008–present
- Labels: Philips (1971); Harvest / EMI Electrola (1973–1984); ACI (1988–1994); GUN / BMG (1998); Artist Station (2009–present)
- Members: Frank Bornemann; Klaus-Peter Matziol; Hannes Folberth; Michael Gerlach; Stephan Emig
- Past members: Erich Schriever; Helmut Draht; Wolfgang Stöcker; Manfred Wieczorke; Fritz Randow; Luitjen Jansen; Detlef "Pitter" Schwaar; Detlev Schmidtchen; Jürgen Rosenthal; Jim McGillivray; Hannes Arkona; Bodo Schopf; Kristof Hinz
- Website: eloy-legacy.com

Eloy is a German rock band. Founded in 1969 by guitarist Frank Bornemann, the band is best known for their progressive rock music.

== History ==
Founded in 1969 by guitarist Frank Bornemann, the band has endured several line-up changes, with Bornemann being the only consistent member of the group. In the 1980s, after a series of major splits in the group, Bornemann pursued a more commercial direction. However, in later years, former members of the band re-joined, and in 1998 released the album Ocean 2, a return to the classic symphonic progressive rock genre for which the band was well known. Despite attracting a large following in Germany, the band never gained popularity in the United States.

The name Eloy is based on the futurist race of humans from the book The Time Machine by H. G. Wells (there spelled "Eloi"). Bornemann described the origin of the name of the band thus: "Wells describes in his book the situation of mankind about 800,000 years later, and 'Eloy' is a human race in his story. The Eloy in Wells' story have made a new start with the help of the time traveler. In a way, it was a new beginning for the human race. German rock bands in the late 1960s played mainly covers from other bands instead of playing their own compositions. Record deals for German bands were absolutely rare and German bands generally were considered to be second class bands in their own country. At that time it was a strong effort for a German band to come out with only their own compositions. It was a start into an unknown future, and from this point of view, comparable to the human race in Wells' story. That is why I got the idea to name the band 'Eloy'."

Bornemann reunited Eloy for its 40th anniversary in 2009. After a break of eleven years, the band released a new album called Visionary, aiming to recapture the spirit of the early years. A double DVD The Legacy Box was released in December 2010 and contains a number of videos and television recordings from all periods of the band, as well as a documentary of the band's history.

The band played at festivals in Germany and Switzerland in July 2011 with largely the same personnel as those on the 1994–1995 tour. The band was booked to headline the North East Art Rock Festival in June 2012 – its first North American concert – but had to cancel after Bornemann was injured in road accident in March. In 2017 and 2019 two new CDs based on the legend of Jeanne d'Arc were released.

== Music ==
Although Eloy was a German rock band that debuted during the same time period as the introduction of krautrock, they are not a part of that music scene. Initially a hard rock band with blues rock influences, Eloy subsequently shifted into a different sound, which has been classified as progressive rock, symphonic rock and space rock.

== Band members ==
Current members

- Frank Bornemann – guitar (1969–1984, 1986–1998, 2008–present), lead vocals (1972–1984, 1986–1998, 2008–present)
- Klaus-Peter Matziol – bass (1976–1984, 1994–1998, 2008–present), backing vocals (1976–1981)
- Hannes Folberth – keyboards (1980–1984, 2008–present)
- Michael Gerlach – keyboards (1986–1998, 2008–present), drums (1986–1988)
- Stephan Emig – drums (2018–present)

Former members

- Erich Schriever – lead vocals, keyboards (1969–1972)
- Helmut Draht – drums (1969–1972; died 2003)
- Wolfgang Stöcker – bass (1969–1973)
- Manfred Wieczorke – guitar, backing vocals (1969–1974), keyboards (1972–1975)
- Fritz Randow – drums (1972–1975, 1981–1984)
- Luitjen Jansen – bass (1974–1975; died 2008)
- Detlef "Pitter" Schwaar – guitar (1975)
- Detlev Schmidtchen – keyboards, backing vocals (1976–1979), guitar (1976)
- Jürgen Rosenthal – drums (1976–1979)
- Jim McGillivray – drums (1979–1981)
- Hannes Arkona – guitar (1979–1984), keyboards (1981–1984)
- Bodo Schopf – drums (1997–1998, 2008–2014)
- Kristof Hinz – drums (2016–2018)

== Discography ==
=== Studio albums ===
- Eloy (1971)
- Inside (1973)
- Floating (1974)
- Power and the Passion (1975)
- Dawn (1976)
- Ocean (1977)
- Silent Cries and Mighty Echoes (1979)
- Colours (1980)
- Planets (1981)
- Time to Turn (1982)
- Performance (1983)
- Metromania (1984)
- Code Name: Wild Geese (1984) (soundtrack)
- Ra (1988)
- Destination (1992)
- The Tides Return Forever (1994)
- Ocean 2: The Answer (1998)
- Visionary (2009)
- The Vision, the Sword and the Pyre – Part I (2017)
- The Vision, the Sword and the Pyre – Part II (2019)
- Echoes from the Past (2023)

=== Live albums ===
- Live (1978)
- Live Impressions (DVD, 2013)
- Reincarnation on Stage (2014)

=== Compilations / remix albums / box sets ===
- Rarities (1991)
- Chronicles I (1993)
- Best (1994)
- Chronicles II (1994)
- The Best of Eloy Vol. 1 – The Early Days 1972–1975 (1994)
- The Best of Eloy Vol. 2 - The Prime 1976-1979 (1996)
- Timeless Passages (2003)
- The Legacy Box (2010)
- The Classic Years Trilogy (2019)
- Hidden Treasures (2024)
