= The Tides Return Forever =

Studio album by Eloy
- Released: 20 November 1994
- Recorded: July–October 1994
- Studio: Horus Sound, Hanover; Pinkball, Berlin
- Genre: Progressive rock
- Length: 47:22
- Label: ACI
- Producer: Frank Bornemann

Eloy chronology
Chronicles II (1994)	The Tides Return Forever (1994)	Ocean 2: The Answer (1998)

Alternative cover
- 2011 remastered CD reissue cover

Singles from The Tides Return Forever
- 1. "Generation Of Innocence / The Tides Return Forever / The Tides Return Forever (Radio Version)" Released: 1994; 2. "Childhood Memories (edit 1) / Childhood Memories (edit 2)" Released: 1994

Audio sample
- "The Tides Return Forever": file; help

Professional ratings
Review scores
Source	Rating
ArtRock	6/10 stars
Background Magazine	4/5 stars
Metal.de	7/10 stars
Musik Reviews	Positive
PowerMetal.de	Positive
Rock Hard	9/10 stars
Rock Times	Mixed
Terrorverlag	Positive

The Tides Return Forever is the fifteenth studio album by the German rock band Eloy, released in 1994.

With this album, bassist Klaus-Peter Matziol returned to Eloy as a full-time member for the first time since they temporarily disbanded in late 1984. Matziol was working closely with Eloy during the 1992–1994 period too, as he was a guest musician in the albums Destination (1992), Chronicles I (1993) and Chronicles II (1994).

Trying to achieve a more vintage sound, Eloy used analogue keyboards and recorded the entire album in 3M magnetic tape.

As the album's release coincided with the band's 25th anniversary, Bornemann decided to set up a full band lineup and play some celebratory Eloy concerts, 10 years after the last time they toured in 1984. The 1994 touring lineup consisted of the three main Eloy members Frank Bornemann (lead guitar, vocals), Michael Gerlach (keyboards, backing vocals) and Klaus-Peter Matziol (bass), along with Susanne Schätzle and Bettina Lux on extra vocals, Bodo Schopf on drums, and Steve Mann on guitar.

== Track listing ==
Music by Frank Bornemann and Michael Gerlach, lyrics by Bornemann.

No.	Title	Length
1.	"The Day of Crimson Skies"	5:02
2.	"Fatal Illusions"	9:22
3.	"Childhood Memories"	6:22
4.	"Generation of Innocence"	6:10
5.	"The Tides Return Forever"	6:40
6.	"The Last in Line"	4:01
7.	"Company of Angels"	9:45
Total length:		47:22

2011 Remastered CD reissue bonus track
No.	Title	Length
8.	"The Tides Return Forever" (Remix 2011)	6:40

== Personnel ==
All information according to the album's liner notes, numbers in parentheses indicate specific tracks.

Eloy

- Frank Bornemann: guitar, lead vocals
- Michael Gerlach: keyboards, backing vocals
- Klaus-Peter Matziol: bass

Guest musicians

- Nico Baretta: drums
- Jocelyn B. Smith: vocals (5)
- Miriam Stockley: vocals (7)
- Peter Beckett & Tom Jackson: vocals (5–7), choir arrangement and conducting (7)
- Susanne Schätzle & Bettina Lux: backing vocals (6)
- Steve Mann: acoustic guitar solo (5)
- Ralf Vornberger: acoustic guitar (5)
- Dirk Michaelis: acoustic guitar (3)

Production

- Frank Bornemann: production
- Gerhard Wölfle: engineering
- Hans-Jörg Maucksch: mastering

Artwork

- Michael Narten: graphic design
