= Dawn (Eloy album) =

Studio album by Eloy
- Released: 4 October 1976
- Recorded: August–September 1976
- Studios: Tonstudio Nedeltschev, Cologne, Germany
- Genres: Progressive rock, krautrock
- Length: 47:30
- Label: Harvest / EMI Electrola
- Producer: Eloy

Eloy chronology
Power and the Passion (1975)	Dawn (1976)	Ocean (1977)

Audio sample
- "Awakening" / "Between the Times": file; help

Professional ratings
Review scores
Source	Rating
Allmusic	4/5 stars
ArtRock	7/10 stars
Metal Zone	100%
Only Solitaire	11/15 stars
Sea of Tranquility	4/5 stars

Dawn is the fifth studio album by German rock band Eloy, released in 1976.

It is a concept album conceived by Frank Bornemann and written by Jürgen Rosenthal, an abstract sequel to the previous year's Power and the Passion. Jamie, the protagonist, has now died, and his spirit travels through time and space in search for his beloved Jeanne and the ultimate salvation.

After the release of the previous Eloy album, the band broke up and reformed, with Bornemann as the only original and core member. The new version of Eloy consisted of Bornemann himself on guitar and vocals, Klaus-Peter Matziol on bass, Detlev Schmidtchen on keyboards, and Jürgen Rosenthal on percussion. Dawn is also the first Eloy album to feature a symphonic orchestra.

== Synopsis ==
Rendition according to the album's lyrics, song titles stylized according to the album's liner notes.

Jamie has a metaphysical out-of-body experience realizing he is dead, and the divine light he sees awakes memories of his beloved Jeanne ("Awakening"). As his spirit travels through space and time, he balances between happiness and sadness, seeking her ("Between the Times"). He then has a fond flashback of the period he lived with Jeanne, and how happy he felt back then, in contrast with the present ("Memory Flash"). Suddenly, Jamie hears an irresistible voice calling him to follow it, for his own good ("Appearance of the VOICE" / "Return of the VOICE"). The voice is communicating with him cryptically, telling him he should "wait for the dawning" before he continues his cosmic journey ("The Sun-Song"). The enigmatic message worries Jamie, who wonders if he will be able to fulfill his goal of meeting Jeanne and escape into eternity, or if this daring venture will lead him to his ultimate doom ("The Dance in Doubt and Fear").

As he sinks into a cosmic spiral of negativity, Jamie fears he won't be able to fulfill his purpose ("LOST?! (Introduction)"). Suddenly, he feels like his spirit has returned into his injured body, in a delicate balance between life and death. Quickly regaining his strength, he throws himself back into battle ("LOST?? (The Decision)"). At first, he fights frantically during the night, feeling almost invincible, but he quickly realizes the futility of war and finally understands the advice of the voice to "wait for the dawning", considering dawn as his only hope. ("The Midnight Fight"). Having now attained a higher level of self-awareness, he realizes that his earthly life is indeed gone, but he is convinced that he will live again, now knowing that true power does not lie in hatred ("The Victory of Mental Force"). Finally, Jamie completely disconnects from his earthly form with one last nostalgic recollection of human senses, and surrenders to his cosmic existence of divine spirituality, assimilated by the heavenly light ("Gliding Into Light and Knowledge"), while enjoying the sunny eternity in a playful mood ("Le Réveil du Soleil/The Dawn").

== Background ==
After the release of Power and the Passion the previous year, Frank Bornemann decided to break up Eloy in order to get rid of their manager Jay Partridge, with whom he had insurmountable disagreements. EMI Electrola supported him and encouraged him to reincarnate the band with new musicians in order to keep the Eloy brand under contract.

First, Bornemann recruited keyboardist Detlev Schmidtchen, whom he met at a music festival playing for a band called Getriebe. Second came bassist Klaus-Peter Matziol, whom Bornemann met as a customer in a music store he was working at for the short period Eloy were inactive. Matziol then suggested his old bandmate Jürgen Rosenthal as a drummer. Rosenthal was already famous as a Scorpions member, and he was trying to find his way back into the music industry after his mandatory military service. Their new manager was Bernd Gulkelberger, whom Bornemann describes as "independent and very professional".

With improved cohesion within the new lineup and management, Eloy achieved greater commercial success (see Reception).

== Influences ==
According to critics, Eloy were influenced by groups like Yes, Pink Floyd, Emerson, Lake & Palmer and The Who, especially by the albums Tales from Topographic Oceans, The Dark Side of the Moon, Tarkus and Tommy. Eloy evidently make lyrical references to The Who's "Pinball Wizard" in their song "The Dance in Doubt and Fear" with the lyric "Whose pinball-wizzard (sic) do I have to play", and to Yes' "Ritual (Nous Sommes du Soleil)" in their song "Le Réveil du Soleil/The Dawn", with the lyric "Nous sommes du soleil".

== Reception ==
The immediate response to Dawn was positive, as the album sold more than 150,000 copies soon after its release, the supporting live tour was sold out, driving Eloy to schedule additional dates to cover the demand, and they were invited to appear on TV for the first time.

Retrospectively, critics often question the album's lyrical quality, while praising its musical virtues. The Greek edition of Metal Hammer magazine highlighted Dawn as the best Eloy album of the 1970s.

== Track listing ==
Music by Eloy, lyrics by Jürgen Rosenthal.

=== Original track list ===
Titles stylized according to the album's liner notes.

No.	Title	Length
1.	"Awakening"	2:38
2.	"Between the Times" a. "Between the Times" (1:50) b. "Memory Flash" (1:57) c. "Appearance of the VOICE" (1:10) d. "Return of the VOICE" (1:08)	6:07
3.	"The Sun-Song"	4:55
4.	"The Dance in Doubt and Fear"	4:25
5.	"LOST!?? (Introduction)"	5:18
6.	"LOST?? (The Decision)"	4:58
7.	"The Midnight-Fight / The Victory of Mental Force"	8:09
8.	"Gliding Into Light and Knowledge"	4:15
9.	"Le Réveil Du Soleil / The Dawn"	6:45
Total length:		47:30

=== 1988 CD reissue track list ===
In the 1988 reissue, the "Between the Times" suite is divided into its four parts, resulting in a track list of twelve songs instead of nine. Although the titles of tracks 3–8 appear shuffled in between them, the actual tracks are not reordered and the original album flow is retained. An extra column with the proper song titles is added in the following track list, for clarification.

No.	Title	Proper Title	Length
1.	"Awakening"		2:38
2.	"Between the Times"		1:50
3.	"The Sun-Song"	"Memory Flash"	1:57
4.	"The Dance in Doubt and Fear"	"Appearance of the VOICE"	1:12
5.	"LOST!?? (Introduction)"	"Return of the VOICE"	1:08
6.	"Memory-Flash"	"The Sun-Song"	4:55
7.	"Appearance of the VOICE"	"The Dance in Doubt and Fear"	4:25
8.	"Return of the VOICE"	"LOST!?? (Introduction)"	5:18
9.	"LOST?? (The Decision)"		4:58
10.	"The Midnight-Fight / The Victory of Mental Force"		8:09
11.	"Gliding Into Light and Knowledge"		4:15
12.	"Le Réveil Du Soleil / The Dawn"		6:45
Total length:			47:32

== Personnel ==
All information according to the original album's liner notes.

Eloy

- Frank Bornemann: lead vocals, electric guitar, acoustic guitar
- Klaus-Peter Matziol: bass, vocals
- Detlev Schmidtchen: Hammond organ, minimoog, Mellotron, piano, grand piano, RMI keyboard computer, vocals, additional guitars
- Jürgen Rosenthal: drums, glockenspiel, gong, timbales, rototom, kettledrums, temple blocks, voices, steps sounds

Additional musicians

- Symphony orchestra arranged by Wolfgang Maus

Production

- Eloy: arrangement, production
- Georgi Nedeltschev: engineering

Artwork

- Uli Handl: photography
- Atelier Kochlowski: design
