= Rototom =

Type of drum

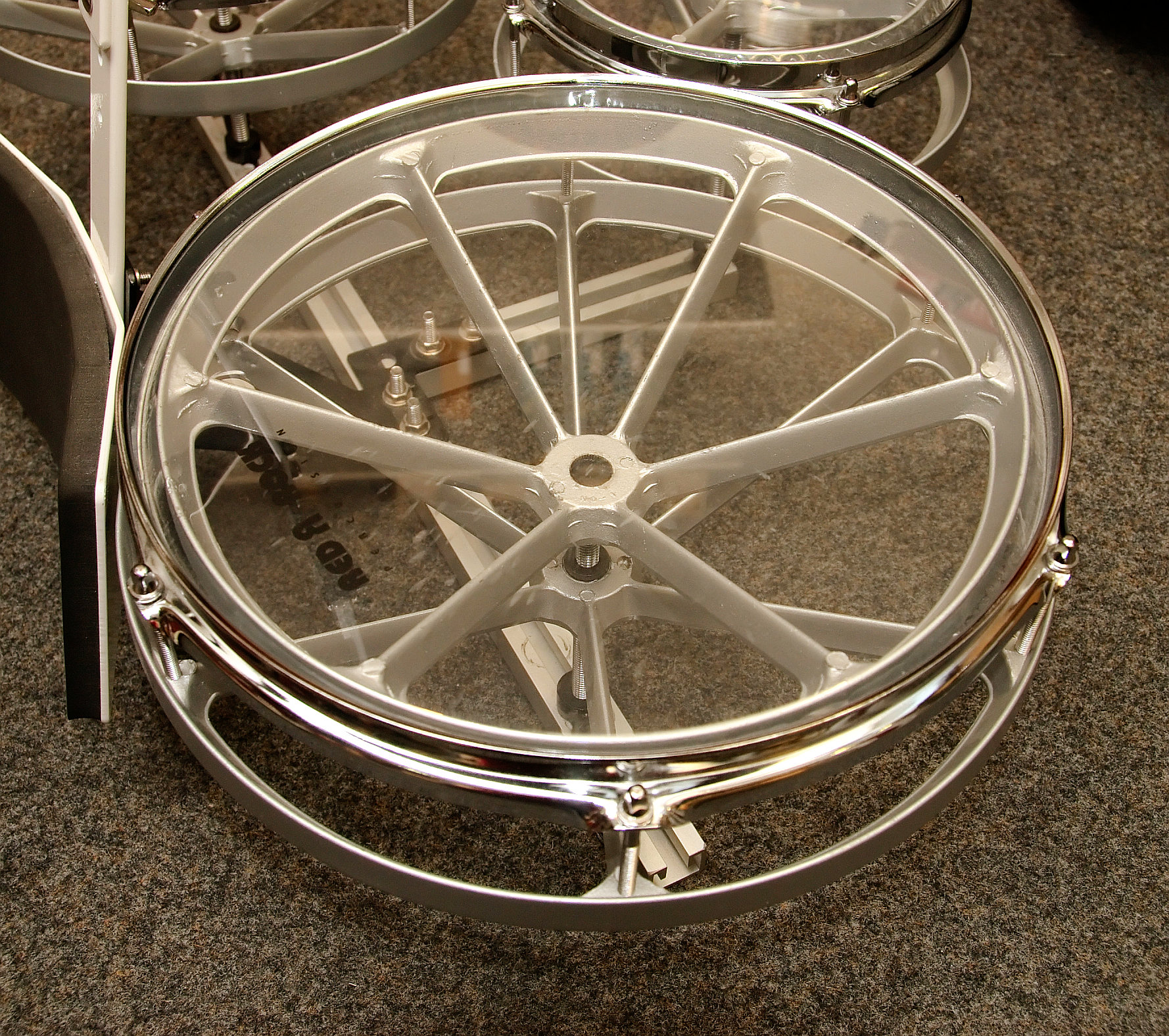
Rototom on a standard mounting bar

The rototom is a shell-less drum developed by Al Payson and Michael Colgrass that is able to change pitch by rotating its drumhead around a threaded metal ring. Unlike many types of drums, rototoms are designed to have a variable definite pitch leading composers to write specific notes for them as pitched percussion instruments. They are also often used to extend the tom range of a standard drum kit.

== Description ==
=== Tuning ===
Rototoms can be tuned quickly by rotating the drumhead, which sits in a threaded metal ring. Rotation raises or lowers the tension hoop relative to the rim, which increases or decreases the pitch of the drum by increasing or decreasing the tension of the drumhead.

=== Sizes ===
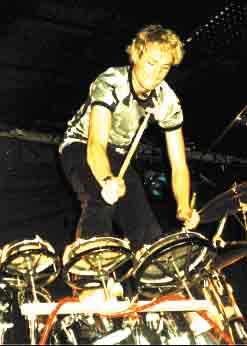
Three small rototoms on a mounting bar

Drum company Remo has historically offered rototoms in seven diameters: 6 inches (15 cm), 8 inches (20 cm), 10 inches (25 cm), 12 inches (30 cm), 14 inches (36 cm), 16 inches (41 cm), and 18 inches (46 cm). However, as of 2023, Remo only offers rototoms ranging from a 6 to 10 inch diameter as part of a set that includes a mounting rail and stand. All other sizes have been discontinued. Each one is tunable over an octave's range or more, although the company notes that the practical range is approximately a sixth. With the cooperation of REMO, Kikutani Music and Maxtone, Japan Percussion Center are now offering a limited number of rototoms ranging from 8 inches (20 cm) to 18 inches (46 cm) as exclusive items.

== Applications ==
Rototoms can replace more specialized drums such as tenor timpani owing to their clear, pitched nature. Jazz, rock and studio performers use rototoms both as a solo voice and as conventional tom-toms; they can be rapidly tuned to produce glissando effects and can be arrayed for a virtual percussion keyboard. For concert and marching band programs, rototoms combine rapid tuning with portability and sound quality, working both as concert tom-toms and as practice timpani. For stage bands and jazz ensembles, drum kits are fitted out with batter heads. When tuned to the mid-range, they have an indefinite pitch with fewer harmonic overtones than conventional tom-toms; tuned to the high range, they produce a sound not unlike timbales.

Rototoms can assist students in ear training and in developing their timpani techniques and— because of their portability, storability and relatively low cost— are often used by professional performers as practice instruments. They are also used as definite-pitched instruments in elementary music programs, such as Orff Schulwerk, where their sound quality, pitch stability and rapid tuning are assets.

== Repertoire ==
English composer Michael Tippett used a total of 38 rototoms— tuned chromatically, spanning across three octaves— in his last large-scale orchestral work, The Rose Lake (1993), based on a lake he spotted suddenly transforming from light green to translucent pink while on holiday in Senegal. In 1979, percussionist William Kraft published Encounters VI, a concertino for rototoms and percussion quartet.
