= Power and the Passion (album) =

Studio album by Eloy
- Released: October 1975
- Recorded: June–August 1975
- Studio: Tonstudio Nedeltschev, Cologne, Germany
- Genre: Progressive rock, art rock, krautrock
- Length: 42:23
- Label: Harvest / EMI Electrola
- Producer: Jay Partridge, Eloy

Eloy chronology
Floating (1974)	Power and the Passion (1975)	Dawn (1976)

Audio sample
- "Journey Into 1358": file; help

Professional ratings
Review scores
Source	Rating
Allmusic	2.5/5 stars
ArtRock	6/10 stars
Only Solitaire	8/15 stars
Subjective Sounds	favorable

Power and the Passion is the fourth studio album by German rock band Eloy, released in 1975.

It is a concept album conceived by Frank Bornemann, based on the idea that humanity has achieved great technological progress, but lags behind significantly in the moral and cultural aspect.

The band members remained the same since last year's Floating album, with the addition of Detlef "Pitter" Schwaar on guitar. EMI Electrola producer Richard Smith wrote lyrics with Bornemann as he did on Floating, credited again under the alias "Gordon Bennit". Smith also voiced the character "Zany Magician", with his wife Mary Davis-Smith acting as the character "Jeanne".

The front cover of the album introduced the band's renowned logo with the 3D calligraphic letters, a mainstay throughout their career since then.

== Synopsis ==
Rendition according to the album's lyrics

Jamie, the son of a scientist, wonders about his unfulfilling life while sitting on his own in his father's lab. Suddenly, he has a surrealistic experience that feels like he is traveling to the distant past ("Journey into 1358"). He soon realizes that he actually time-traveled to Paris in April 1358, where he meets a girl named Jeanne, and they begin to explain their stories to each other. Jamie, obviously confused, says that he probably consumed some of the "time-eroding drugs" his father was experimenting with, resulting in his time traveling. Jeanne is the daughter of a cruel landlord, and she is supposed to marry a rich man against her will. Jamie offers to smoke with her some psychoactive drug he had with him, and the two fall in love as they experience the effects ("Love Over Six Centuries").

Jeanne's father allows Jamie to stay with them in exchange for his futuristic knowledge, as the cruel man fights to suppress a peasants' mutiny against him. Jamie morally supports the rebels, but he is forced to obey the landlord in order to stay with his beloved Jeanne ("Mutiny"). As the battle rages on, Jamie is captured and imprisoned by the peasants, feeling guilty for fighting them against his morals and praying to God for his freedom ("Imprisonment").

Free again, Jamie cherishes the sun and nature he missed while he was chained ("Daylight"). He then decides to visit a magician he heard of, hoping he will be able to send Jamie back home, along with Jeanne ("Thoughts of Home"). The magician welcomes him and serves him a potion, promising it will send him back to the present, erasing all the memories from his time traveling ("The Zany Magician").

Eventually, Jamie returns alone, and his memories remain. He compares 1358 with the present and realizes that conflicts among mankind are intensifying as the years go by, rather than subsiding. He also decides to share his story with his friends, but they don't believe him ("Back Into the Present"). Struggling to fully grasp the dream-like experience he had, Jamie visits Notre-Dame de Paris, where the peal of the bells reminds him of his journey in time and how much he is missing Jeanne ("The Bells of Notre Dame").

== Background ==
Power and the Passion was a commercial success, selling more than 30,000 copies soon after its release, but Eloy quickly broke-up. The reason was their insurmountable disagreements with their manager Jay Partridge, who had significant financial and creative influence over the band during the album's creation. Eloy's leader Frank Bornemann intended to release the album in a double LP format and with a different approach on production, but Partridge imposed his own will, to Bornemann's disappointment and frustration.

In order to escape the turbulence, Bornemann decided to resign, effectively breaking up the band. When he announced the break-up to EMI Electrola, they advised him to recreate Eloy with new musicians in order to keep the Eloy brand under contract. Shortly after, Bornemann found new collaborators and Eloy were reformed, creating and releasing Dawn in October 1976.

== Track listing ==
Music by Eloy, lyrics by Frank Bornemann and Gordon Bennit.

No.	Title	Length
1.	"Introduction"	1:10
2.	"Journey Into 1358"	2:56
3.	"Love Over Six Centuries"	10:05
4.	"Mutiny"	9:07
5.	"Imprisonment"	3:12
6.	"Daylight"	2:38
7.	"Thoughts Of Home"	1:04
8.	"The Zany Magician"	2:38
9.	"Back Into The Present"	3:07
10.	"The Bells Of Notre Dame"	6:26
Total length:		42:23

2000 Remastered CD reissue bonus track
No.	Title	Length
11.	"The Bells Of Notre Dame" (remix 1999)	6:26

== Personnel ==
Eloy

- Frank Bornemann: vocals, guitar, voice acting as "Jamie" on track 3
- Detlef "Pitter" Schwaar: guitar
- Manfred Wieczorke: organ, moog, mellotron, electric piano, grand piano
- Luitjen Janssen: bass
- Fritz Randow: drums

Voice acting

- Mary Davis-Smith: "Jeanne" on track 3
- Gordon Bennit: "Zany Magician" on track 8

Production

- Jay Partridge: production
- Eloy: production
- Wolfgang Thierbach: engineering

Artwork

- Roman Rybnikar: art direction
- Atelier Kochlowski: design
