= Jürgen Rosenthal =

German rock drummer (born 1949)

- Born: 28 July 1949 (age 76); Rosengarten, West Germany
- Genres: Progressive rock, hard rock, space rock, heavy metal
- Occupation: Musician

Jürgen Rosenthal is a German rock drummer.

== Biography ==
Rosenthal was a member of Uli Jon Roth's band Dawn Road and became a member of the Scorpions along with Roth and Francis Buchholz. He appeared on the album Fly to the Rainbow before leaving the band to do his compulsory service with the army. He later appeared in Eloy and wrote the lyrics for their 1977 album Ocean as well as for the album Dawn.

== Discography ==
=== With Scorpions ===
- Fly to the Rainbow (1974)

=== With Eloy ===
- Dawn (1976)
- Ocean (1977)
- Live (1978)
- Silent Cries and Mighty Echoes (1979)

=== With Ego on the Rocks ===
- Ego on the Rocks – Acid in Wounderland (1981)

=== With Echo Park ===
- Echo Park (1988)
