= Electrola =

German record label

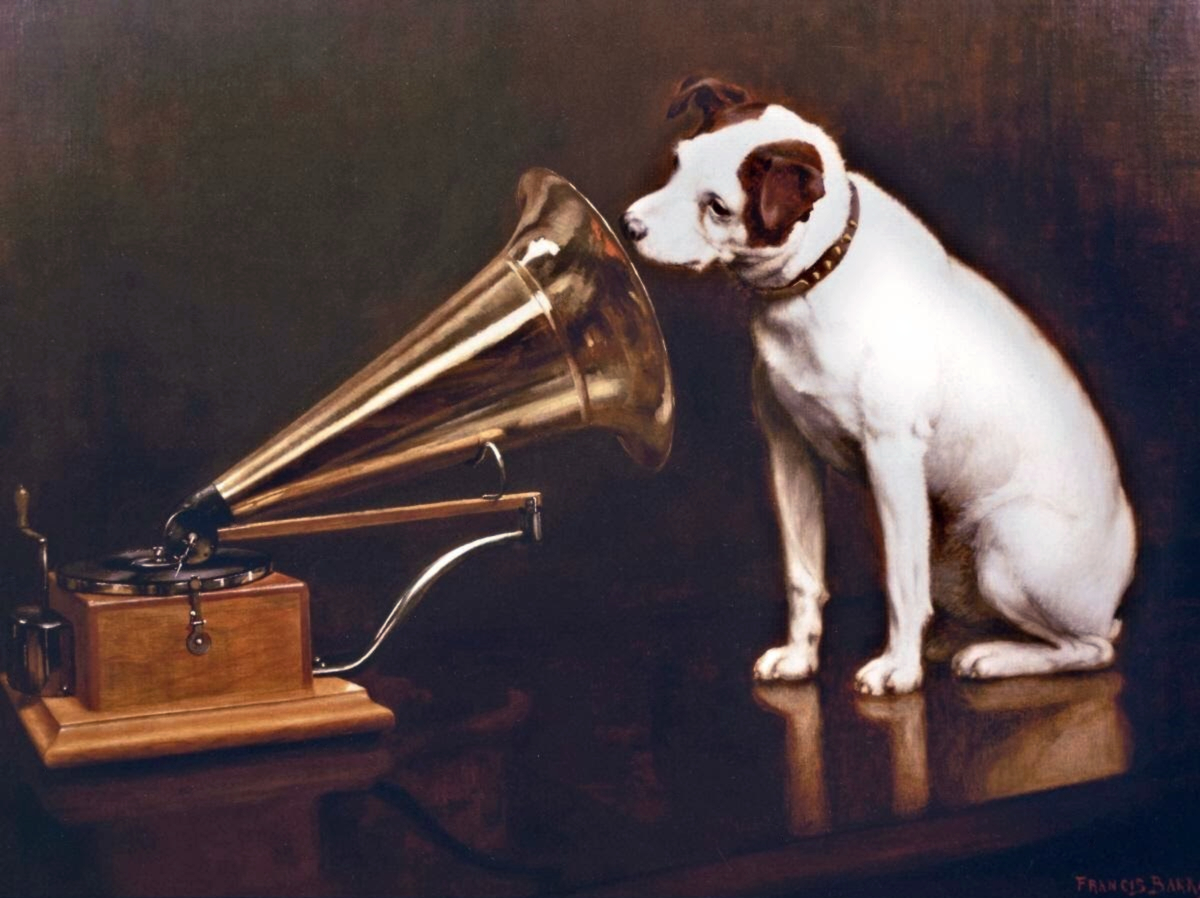
- The label used the His Master's Voice trademark
- Parent company: Gramophone Company (Carl Lindström A.G.) (1925–31); EMI (1931–79, 1996–2012); Thorn EMI (1979–96); Universal Music Group (2012–present)
- Founded: May 8, 1925; 101 years ago
- Founder: Gramophone Company (Carl Lindström A.G.)
- Genre: Various
- Country of origin: Germany
- Location: Cologne
- Official website: www.electrola.de

Electrola is a German record label and subsidiary of Universal Music Group. Based in Munich, its roster has included Chumbawamba, Matthias Reim, Helene Fischer, Brings, Höhner and Santiano.

== History ==
On 8 May 1925, the British Gramophone Company Limited founded Electrola GmbH in Nowawes near Berlin and received its record licence in December. Electrola was created to replace the Gramophone Company's former German subsidiary Deutsche Grammophon Gesellschaft, which had seceded from the Gramophone Company due to hostilities between Germany and Great Britain following the outbreak of the First World War. In March 1931, the Gramophone Company Ltd. merged with Lindström's parent Columbia Graphophone Company to form Electric and Musical Industries Limited (EMI). Electrola continued as the merged entity's German subsidiary. Around 300 publications per month allowed Electrola's general catalogue to grow to 11,000 titles by 1934. At the end of 1939 Electrola - like the other German record labels - came under National Socialist administration. As a result, the most typical US jazz song "In the Mood" was no longer released. Recorded on 1 August 1939 it was released in the United States in September. During the Second World War, 80 per cent of the facilities in the German subsidiaries were destroyed, making it impossible to resume production immediately after the war. Electrola decided - not least because of the uncertain situation in Berlin - to move completely to Cologne.

On the site of the former Atlantic Gummi-Werke Aloys Weyers KG in Cologne-Braunsfeld, Maarweg 149, an area that could be expanded was found. The company was founded here in Cologne by being entered in the commercial register on 13 February 1952; the official relocation to Cologne took place on 8 September 1953. A modern recording studio was opened in 1956 on Maarweg in Cologne - where the records were also made - with all the associated technical rooms. In these studios all hits from Fred Bertelmann to Conny Froboess and Gitte Hænning, but also the last recordings with Marlene Dietrich up to the era of Herbert Grönemeyer, were produced. When the compact cassette came onto the market as a new sound carrier in 1965, an in-house music cassette (MC) production was also set up in 1966. This was the last investment by the Carl Lindström-Gesellschaft, which was merged into EMI Electrola GmbH on 30 November 1972.

In October 1979, EMI merged with the British company Thorn Electrical Industries to form Thorn EMI Ltd. In August 1996, The corporation was split into two independently operating companies, EMI Group and Thorn plc and listed on the British Stock Exchange. In June 1992, Thorn EMI acquired the independent label Virgin Records, for a purchase price of US$957 million, ending intense competition for the company, which had many best-selling musical artists under contract.

In January 1994, another independent German company Intercord Tonträger was added, with which EMI was able to further expand its artist base. In 2000, the Intercord location in Stuttgart was closed and the repertoire was mainly transferred to EMI Electrola GmbH & Co KG. In August 2000, the company moved from Maarweg to Cologne's media centre - the Mediapark; the data centre followed in December 2002. In the spring of 2002, EMI Electrola was renamed EMI Music Germany GmbH & Co. KG. After the Munich location was closed in April 2004, the Virgin label merged with the Berlin-based labels Mute and Labels. Since then, the company has been operating at the two locations in Cologne and Berlin. Initially, EMI Music Germany was based at three locations in Munich (Virgin), Cologne (Capitol with pop and EMI Classics and Blue Note for jazz) and Berlin (Labels Germany and Mute); Virgin Records was absorbed into Labels and Mute in 2004. The centre of the German record industry, however, was in Hamburg, home to the record labels Polydor, Teldec (Telefunken/Decca), Philips and Metronome.

In 2012, Electrola and the rest of EMI's German operations were sold to Universal Music Group (UMG); in December 2012, UMG relocated the former EMI Music Germany from Cologne to Berlin, while Electrola was moved to Munich. However, the EC compelled UMG to divest itself of EMI Classics, which operated with other European EMI assets to be divested as the Parlophone Label Group (PLG). In February 2013, UMG sold PLG, including EMI Classics, to Warner Music Group (WMG). The EC approved the deal in May, and WMG took control of EMI Classics on 1 July, ceding it to Warner Classics.

== Technical aspects ==
The company name "Electrola" is derived from the electrical recording process that was used for records from 1925 and is named after an electric record player from RCA Victor. Electrical recording meant turning away from the funnel to the microphone, to electrical needle recording and the corresponding playback. The advantages of "electrical recording" were higher volume, lower noise, no "funnel sound" on the recording side, extended frequency response, less bass and excessively center-stressed ("squeaky"), so overall more natural. Whereas before a recording frequency range of only 600 to 2000 Hz was possible, it was now between 100 and 5000 Hz. The number of revolutions was set consistently at 78 / min. Today those recordings that were made with the funnel are called "acoustic" recordings, everything later than "electrical" recordings. The shellac records used were fragile, had a speed of 78 rpm and a maximum playing time of approx. 3 minutes per side for a diameter of 25 cm and 4 minutes for a 30 cm diameter. There were about 4 grooves with a minimum width of 0.15 mm for every 1 mm. There was a regular spiral from the outside in.

In the early days, Electrola recordings were often made at the Singakademie Berlin. In 1927 the first electrical reproduction was possible in Germany; Electrola was already producing electrically recorded records in England from 1925, and in Germany from spring 1926.

== Personnel ==
The energetic reconstruction in Cologne is thanks to Ladislaus Veder, who served as managing director until 1969. Jazz and classical music fan Max Ittenbach was appointed artistic director in 1956.

Nils Nobach worked for Electrola from 1953 as a producer and composer (often under the pseudonym Peter Ström), who became one of the most prominent hit producers of the time. He produced Bibi Johns, Wolfgang Sauer, Fred Bertelmann, Conny (1957), the Nilsen Brothers (1958), Angèle Durand, Gitte Hænning, Rex Gildo (March 1959), and Adamo (1964). In November 1961 Nobach left Electrola and Heinz Gietz took over the position of production manager for pop.

Its debut was the "Hämmerchen-Polka", sung by Chris Howland in November 1961. Under his direction, the super hits "Zwei kleine Italiener" and "Lady Sunshine and Mister Moon" with Conny Froboess, "Speedy Gonzales" with Rex Gildo, "Motorbiene" with Benny Quick, and another of his own compositions, "Mimi Never Goes to Bed" with Bill Ramsey, were created under his direction in 1962 the top seller of the year. Gietz left Electrola in 1965, but continued to produce Electrola performers as a freelance producer (including the Lords). In 1968 the Cornet label, owned by Gietz, released the first record with the title "Mer schenken dä Ahl e couple Blömcher" from the Kölsch dialect group De Bläck Fööss.

== See also ==
- List of record labels
