= Frank Bornemann =

- Born: 27 April 1945 (age 81); Hannover, Germany
- Genres: Progressive rock, Space rock
- Instruments: Guitar, vocals, percussion, harmonica
- Years active: 1967–present

Frank Bornemann (born 27 April 1945) is a German guitarist and vocalist best known as part of the German progressive rock band Eloy. He is also the founder of the Horus Sound Studios in Hannover, Germany where he worked until 2014.

== Life ==
Frank Bornemann has been active as a musician since the early 1960s. He founded the progressive rock band Eloy in 1969. As a discoverer and producer of the Guano Apes, he also celebrated success as a record producer. Bornemann founded music publishing house and the record label Artist Station and is active in the promotion of young artists. At the request of many fans Frank Bornemann released a new studio album with Eloy and toured again with the band in 1998 after an eleven-year-break. This represented a logistical challenge for members of the band (including longtime bassist Klaus-Peter Matziol who works full-time as managing director of the Peter Rieger concert agency) who are busy and live scattered all over Germany. It is therefore no longer the same band as before when band members lived in or around Hannover and could meet several times a week to rehearse. Bornemann himself lives alternately in Hanover and France.

== Horus Sound Studios ==
Frank Bornemann founded the Horus Sound Studio in Hanover in 1979. The studio is divided into three sections: Studio Enterprise 1, Record Place Studio 2 and the Livingroom Studio. The Studio has three reception rooms and two apartments. Artists including Die Happy, Helloween, Revolverheld, Emil Bulls, Guano Apes, and ...And You Will Know Us by the Trail of Dead have recorded in the studio. Bornemann retired from the business at the beginning of 2014. Since then, producers Mirko Hofmann and Arne Neurand (who have many years of experience in this studio) have been the new co-owners of Horus. Henning Rümenapp (a guitarist in Guano Apes) remains Managing Director and also a partner.

== Sources ==
- Matthias Blazek: The Lower Saxony Band Compendium 1963-2003 - Facts and Figures of 100 Rock Groups from Lower Saxony (Das niedersächsische Bandkompendium 1963–2003 – Daten und Fakten von 100 Rockgruppen aus Niedersachsen). Celle, 2006, pp. 59–60, ISBN 978-3-00-018947-0
