= Hugh McKenna =

Scottish musician (1949–2019)

- Born: 28 November 1949; Coatbridge, Scotland
- Died: 18 December 2019 (aged 70)
- Genre: Rock
- Instruments: Keyboards, vocals
- Years active: 1972–2019
- Formerly of: The Sensational Alex Harvey Band

Hugh McKenna (28 November 1949 – 18 December 2019) was a Scottish musician. He was the keyboardist and primary songwriter for The Sensational Alex Harvey Band from 1972 to 2008, and was their lead singer between late 1976–mid 1977 (and on their album Fourplay), when frontman Alex Harvey had left the group.

== Early life ==
McKenna was born and raised in Coatbridge, Scotland.

== Career ==
In August 1972, McKenna joined The Sensational Alex Harvey Band, a group that featured his cousin Ted on drums, and who had all been members of the progressive rock group Tear Gas. The original lineup with McKenna released six studio albums between 1972 and 1977, with McKenna writing most of the bands material with Harvey. When Harvey left the band briefly between late 1976 to mid 1977, Hugh took over on lead vocals, including on their only album without Harvey, Fourplay.

When Harvey returned to the band in mid 1977, Hugh left after a fall out with Harvey, and was replaced by Tommy Eyre, and released one more album, Rock Drill, before disbanding in 1978. By 1979, McKenna had reconciled with Harvey, and accompanied Harvey on his solo tour. When Alex Harvey died in 1982, McKenna played the SAHB song "Anthem" at his funeral.

In 1993, SAHB members Ted McKenna, Chris Glen and Zal Cleminson had been collaborating together in the band The Party Boys, and decided to reform the Sensational Alex Harvey Band and invited Hugh into the group. They had disbanded by 1995, but reformed in 2002, and remained active until 2008, with Stevie Doherty, Billy Rankin and Max Maxwell serving as lead singers during the reformed versions of the group.

== Death ==
McKenna died from a short illness on 18 December 2019. His cousin Ted had died in January that same year.
