= The Impossible Dream (The Sensational Alex Harvey Band album) =

Studio album by The Sensational Alex Harvey Band
- Released: October 4, 1974
- Recorded: 1974
- Studio: Apple Studios, London
- Genre: Hard rock
- Length: 43:09
- Label: Vertigo, 2002 CD reissue released on Mercury
- Producer: The Sensational Alex Harvey Band, David Batchelor "Sergeant Fury" by Derek Wadsworth

The Sensational Alex Harvey Band chronology
Next (1973)	The Impossible Dream (1974)	Tomorrow Belongs to Me (1975)

Singles from The Impossible Dream
- 1. "Sergeant Fury" Released: August 2, 1974; 2. "Anthem" Released: November 15, 1974

Professional ratings
Review scores
Source	Rating
Allmusic	4/5 stars
Christgau's Record Guide	C−

The Impossible Dream was the third album by The Sensational Alex Harvey Band, released October 4, 1974. The album was released separately on CD but can be hard to find; however, the CD is widely available on a 2-in-1 album, the other album being Tomorrow Belongs to Me. It was the band's first release to chart, peaking at No. 16 on the UK Album Chart. "Anthem" was the last single released by SAHB in the U.S.

Between March 26–4 April 1974 at Advision Studios, London, the SAHB had recorded an album with producer Shel Talmy. It remained unreleased until 2009 when it was released as Hot City. Many of the songs were re-recorded for The Impossible Dream.

== Track listing ==
All tracks composed by Alex Harvey and Hugh McKenna; except where indicated.

Side one
No.	Title	Writer(s)	Length
1.	"Hot City Symphony Part 1: Vambo"		5:02
2.	"Hot City Symphony Part 2: Man in the Jar"	Harvey, McKenna, Alistair Cleminson	8:11
3.	"River of Love"		3:15
4.	"Long Hair Music"		4:43
5.	"Hey"	Harvey, Cleminson, McKenna	0:40

Side two
No.	Title	Writer(s)	Length
1.	"Sergeant Fury"	Harvey, McKenna, David Batchelor	3:31
2.	"Weights Made of Lead"	Harvey	2:41
3.	"Money Honey / The Impossible Dream"	Jesse Stone / Mitch Leigh, Joe Darion	2:11
4.	"Tomahawk Kid"	Harvey, McKenna, Batchelor	4:30
5.	"Anthem"		7:42

== Personnel ==
=== The Sensational Alex Harvey Band ===
- Alex Harvey – lead vocals, rhythm guitar
- Zal Cleminson – guitar
- Chris Glen – bass guitar
- Hugh McKenna – keyboards, synthesizer
- Ted McKenna – drums

=== Additional musicians ===
- Vicky Silva – guest vocals on "Anthem"
- London-Scottish TA Regiment (including John Gilligan) – drums and pipes on "Anthem"

=== Technical ===
- The Sensational Alex Harvey Band – producer
- David Batchelor – producer (all tracks except #4)
- Derek Wadsworth – producer (track 4)
- Martin Rushent – engineer (all tracks except #4)
- Dave "Cyrano" Langston – engineer (track 4)
- Keith Davis – cover illustration, design

== Charts ==
Chart (1974)	Peak position
Australian Albums (Kent Music Report)	78
UK Albums (OCC)	16

== Certifications ==
Region	Certification	Certified units/sales
United Kingdom (BPI)	Silver	60,000^{^}
^{^} Shipments figures based on certification alone.
