= Tomorrow Belongs to Me (album) =

Studio album by The Sensational Alex Harvey Band
- Released: April 1975
- Recorded: 1975
- Studio: Scorpio Studios, London
- Genre: Hard rock
- Length: 37:15
- Label: Vertigo, 1993 German CD reissue released on PolyGram. UK 2002 reissue released on Mercury
- Producer: David Batchelor

The Sensational Alex Harvey Band chronology
| The Impossible Dream (1974) | Tomorrow Belongs to Me (1975) | Live (1975) |

Professional ratings
Review scores
| Source | Rating |
|---|---|
| Allmusic | 2.5/5 stars |

Tomorrow Belongs to Me is the fourth studio album by The Sensational Alex Harvey Band. It was released in 1975 on Vertigo Records. While no A-side singles were released from this album, three compositions were used as B-sides to other SAHB singles: "Soul in Chains", as a live version taken from the subsequent tour, "Shake That Thing" and "Snake Bite". The album's title track was a cover of a key song in the 1966 musical Cabaret and its 1972 film adaptation.

== Background ==
In his 2002 book The Sensational Alex Harvey, John Neil Munro suggests that the album was written while the group was on tour, a common practice for them. In this instance the group had only recently toured the US, attracting devotees such as Iggy Pop and Elton John. If written while on tour in the US, the album must therefore have been recorded (at Scorpio and Air Studios) in the early months of 1975, as it was released in April of that year.

Munro relates that reviews of the album in the UK were positive - Charles Shaar Murray in the NME, for instance, comparing Harvey to Frank Zappa and opining that the song 'Give My Compliments to the Chef' was the best thing the band had done. Mike Diana, writing in the Newport Daily Press, similarly claimed that 'Give My Compliments to the Chef' was his "favourite cut on the album (just beating out the intro to 'Sharks Teeth')"; Diana compared Harvey to Mike Patto: "Both are well suited to the material they compose... both [are] outrageous." A writer identified as 'JIC' in the Charleston Gazette-Mail regarded the record as ‘a futuristic concept album’ and opined that ‘if they don’t become a giant act from this set, there’s something wrong with us’

The cover, by Dave Field, which Munro describes as a parody of Roger Dean's art for groups such as Yes, depicts degradation of the environment by earthmoving equipment as referenced in the song "The Tale of the Giant Stoneater". In Field's image, a dinosaur is in conflict with an autonomous piece of earthmoving equipment while another dinosaur (possibly the "brontosaurus" who "lies wrong way up" in the song) is seen dead in the background. Munro relates that the song was a response by Harvey to witnessing "a bulldozer paving the way for a new motorway through previously unspoilt land" while on holiday in the West of Scotland. The words to this song - with an alternative title, 'And Another Tree Dies of Shame' - appear on the back cover on what appears to be Harvey's original lyric sheet, as well as being typeset within the gatefold with the remainder of the album's lyrics. Curiously while both versions of these lyrics subtly differ, they are similar in ascribing parts of the song to 'girl', 'man' and 'commentator' (and 'all together'), however Harvey is the only vocalist on the actual track. This song's contrast between ancient lives and the contemporary events eliminating their trace can be seen as comparable to the album's title track, which also brings together a celebration of an ancient natural environment and a 'tomorrow' which will replace it. The title track, while not directly evoking parallels to Nazism, would be associated by most who heard it with its sinister presentation in the film Cabaret.

Although it lacked a hit single, this was the only Sensational Alex Harvey Band album to chart in the UK Top Ten.

== Track listings ==
1. "Action Strasse" (Alex Harvey, Alistair Cleminson, Hugh McKenna) – 3:12
2. "Snake Bite" (Harvey) – 3:55
3. "Soul in Chains" (David Batchelor, Cleminson, Harvey, H. McKenna) – 3:55
4. "The Tale of the Giant Stoneater" (Harvey, H. McKenna) – 7:20
5. "Ribs and Balls" (Chris Glen, Harvey) – 1:51
6. "Give My Compliments to the Chef" (Harvey, Cleminson, H. McKenna) – 5:32
7. "Shark's Teeth" (Harvey, Cleminson) – 4:54
8. "Shake That Thing" (Harvey) – 3:30
9. "Tomorrow Belongs to Me" (Fred Ebb, John Kander) – 4:14
10. "To Be Continued...(Hail Vibrania!)" (Harvey, Cleminson) – 0:50

Bonus tracks

1. "Big Boy" (Cleminson) – 4:54
2. "Pick It Up and Kick It" (Harvey, H. McKenna) – 4:25

== Personnel ==
=== The Sensational Alex Harvey Band ===
- Alex Harvey – lead vocals, guitar, harmonica
- Zal Cleminson – guitar, backing vocals
- Chris Glen – bass guitar, backing vocals
- Hugh McKenna – keyboards, synthesizer, backing vocals
- Ted McKenna – drums, percussion, backing vocals

=== Additional musicians ===
- Barry St. John, Liza Strike, Vicki Brown – backing vocals on "Action Strasse" and "Soul in Chains"
- Derek Wadsworth – string and brass arrangements

=== Technical ===
- David Batchelor – producer
- Dennis Weinreich – engineer
- Ray Hendriksen – engineer
- Peter Swettenham – extra recording and mixing
- Dave Field – sleeve illustration
- Jack Wood – art direction

== Charts ==
| Chart (1975) | Peak position |
|---|---|
| UK Albums (OCC) | 9 |

== Certifications ==
| Region | Certification | Certified units/sales |
|---|---|---|
| United Kingdom (BPI) | Silver | 60,000^{^} |
^{^} Shipments figures based on certification alone.
