= The Penthouse Tapes =

Studio album by The Sensational Alex Harvey Band
- Released: March 1976
- Recorded: 1975
- Studio: Basing Street, London
- Genre: Rock
- Length: 38:42
- Label: Vertigo, 2002 CD reissue released on Universal International
- Producer: The Sensational Alex Harvey Band, David Batchelor

The Sensational Alex Harvey Band chronology
Live (1975)	The Penthouse Tapes (1976)	SAHB Stories (1976)

Singles from The Penthouse Tapes
- 1. "Gamblin' Bar Room Blues" Released: November 14, 1975; 2. "Runaway" Released: March 5, 1976

Professional ratings
Review scores
Source	Rating
Allmusic	2.5/5 stars

The Penthouse Tapes is the fifth studio album by The Sensational Alex Harvey Band. Unlike previous releases comprising predominantly original compositions.The Penthouse Tapes consists largely of covers, ranging from The Osmonds' "Crazy Horses" and Alice Cooper's "School's Out" to Lead Belly's "Goodnight Irene". Of the three originals, "I Wanna Have You Back" (written by Harvey with Zal Cleminson) and "Jungle Jenny" (by the band with producer David Batchelor) open side one; a third, "Say You're Mine", was written by Alex Harvey and appears on side two. The album was released in 1976 on Vertigo Records.

== Track listing ==
1. "I Wanna Have You Back" (Alex Harvey, Zal Cleminson) – 2:42
2. "Jungle Jenny" (David Batchelor, SAHB) – 4:07
3. "Runaway" (Del Shannon, Max Crook) – 2:46
4. "Love Story" (Ian Anderson) – 5:10
5. "School's Out" (Alice Cooper, Michael Bruce, Glen Buxton, Dennis Dunaway, Neal Smith) – 5:02
6. "Goodnight Irene" (Lead Belly) – 4:30
7. "Say You're Mine (Every Cowboy Song)" (Harvey) – 3:23
8. "Gamblin' Bar Room Blues" (Jimmie Rodgers, Shelly Lee Alley) – 4:09
9. "Crazy Horses" (Alan Osmond, Wayne Osmond, Merrill Osmond) – 2:54
10. "Cheek To Cheek" (Irving Berlin) – 3:52 (recorded live at the New Victoria Theatre, London, Christmas 1975)

Side two of the original vinyl version begins with "Goodnight Irene".

== Personnel ==
=== The Sensational Alex Harvey Band ===
- Alex Harvey – lead vocals
- Zal Cleminson – guitars
- Chris Glen – bass guitar
- Hugh McKenna – keyboards, synthesizer
- Ted McKenna – drums, percussion

=== Additional musicians ===
- B.J. Cole – pedal steel guitar on "Say You're Mine" and "Cheek To Cheek"

=== Technical ===
- David Batchelor – producer
- John Burns, John Punter, Douglas Hopkins, Denny Bridges – engineer
- Alex Harvey – liner notes

== Charts ==
Chart (1976)	Peak position
Finnish Albums (The Official Finnish Charts)	3
Swedish Albums (Sverigetopplistan)	35
UK Albums (OCC)	14

== Certifications ==
Region	Certification	Certified units/sales
United Kingdom (BPI)	Silver	60,000^{^}
^{^} Shipments figures based on certification alone.
