= Framed (Sensational Alex Harvey Band album) =

Studio album by The Sensational Alex Harvey Band
- Released: December 1972
- Recorded: 1972
- Studio: Morgan Studios, London
- Genre: Blues rock; hard rock
- Length: 42:09
- Label: Vertigo, 2002 CD reissue released on Universal International
- Producer: The Sensational Alex Harvey Band

The Sensational Alex Harvey Band chronology
Framed (1972)	Next (1973)

Singles from Framed
- 1. "There's No Lights On The Christmas Tree Mother, They're Burning Big Louie Tonight" Released: December 1972

Framed is the 1972 debut album by The Sensational Alex Harvey Band. The title track is a cover of a Leiber and Stoller song originally recorded by The Robins. Other tracks include a cover of the Willie Dixon song "I Just Want to Make Love to You", originally performed by Muddy Waters. Both of these songs had appeared on Alex Harvey recordings as far back as the 1963 live recording from Hamburg, released in 1964 as "Alex Harvey and His Soul Band". "Hammer Song" and "Midnight Moses" are two Harvey originals that first appeared on his solo LP Roman Wall Blues in 1969. "Hole In Her Stocking" had been recorded by Alex Harvey in 1970 on the Rock Workshop eponymous release of the same year.

== Release ==
Recorded at Morgan Studios in London during 1972, Framed was released on vinyl by Vertigo Records in December 1972. A CD version was released by Universal International in 2002. There is a 2 in 1 CD release with Next.

"There's No Lights On The Christmas Tree Mother, They're Burning Big Louie Tonight" was released as a single in December 1972, with "Harp" as the b-side.

== Tracks ==
The title track is a cover of a Jerry Leiber and Mike Stoller song originally recorded by The Robins. This album also features a cover of the song written by Willie Dixon and originally performed by Muddy Waters, "I Just Want to Make Love to You". Both of these songs appeared on Alex Harvey recordings as far back as the 1963 live recording from Hamburg, released in 1964 as "Alex Harvey and His Soul Band". "Hammer Song" and "Midnight Moses" are two Harvey originals that first appeared on his solo LP Roman Wall Blues in 1969. "Hole In Her Stocking" had been recorded by Alex Harvey as recently as 1970 on the Rock Workshop eponymous release of the same year.

== Reception ==
Steven McDonald in a retrospective review for AllMusic feels that Framed was a "great debut and a hell of a rock album".

== Influence ==
In their early school days, under various group names, the Australian post-punk band The Birthday Party used to cover many of the songs from Framed in their live sets, as vocalist Nick Cave was a huge fan of the band. Cave later recorded a version of "The Hammer Song" on the album Kicking Against the Pricks.

== Track listings ==
All tracks composed by Alex Harvey; except where indicated

1. "Framed" (Jerry Leiber, Mike Stoller) – 4:57
2. "Hammer Song" – 4:08
3. "Midnight Moses" – 4:26
4. "Isobel Goudie" (Part 1: My Lady of the Night, Part 2: Coitus Interruptus, Part 3: Virgin and the Hunter) – 7:30
5. "Buff's Bar Blues" – 3:07
6. "I Just Want to Make Love to You" (Willie Dixon) – 6:40
7. "Hole In Her Stocking" – 4:41
8. "There's No Lights On The Christmas Tree, Mother They're Burning Big Louie Tonight" (Jim Condron) – 3:46
9. "St. Anthony" – 4:47

The 2002 CD release incorrectly credits Ritchie Valens as composer for track #1.

== Personnel ==
- Alex Harvey – lead vocals
- Zal Cleminson – lead guitar
- Hugh McKenna – electric piano
- Chris Glen – bass guitar
- Eddie McKenna – drums

Additional musicians

- Phil Kenzie – tenor saxophone
- Big Bud's Brass – brass section (likely to be Bud Parkes, Martin Drover, Phil Kenzie, Dave Coxhill, Geoff Driscoll)

Technical

- Mike Bobak – engineer
- Jim Wilson – photography
