= Next (The Sensational Alex Harvey Band album) =

Next...

Studio album by The Sensational Alex Harvey Band
- Released: 16 November 1973
- Recorded: 1973
- Studio: Audio International, London; Apple, London
- Genre: Glam rock; hard rock
- Length: 35:54
- Label: Vertigo, 2002 CD reissue released on Universal International
- Producer: The Sensational Alex Harvey Band, Phil Wainman

The Sensational Alex Harvey Band chronology
Framed (1972)	Next... (1973)	The Impossible Dream (1974)

Singles from Next
- 1. "Giddy Up a Ding Dong" Released: October 12, 1973 - UK only 2. "Swampsnake" Released: 1973 - US only 3. "The Faith Healer" Released: February 15, 1974 - UK only

Professional ratings
Review scores
Source	Rating
Allmusic	4/5 stars

Next is the second album by The Sensational Alex Harvey Band, released on November 16th 1973 on the Vertigo label.

The album was featured in Robert Dimery's book 1001 Albums You Must Hear Before You Die.

In The Pittsburgh Press, critic Pete Bishop said that the album hits listeners "Right between the eyes...with as much power and subtlety as Larry Csonka up the middle."

The album failed to chart on its initial release, but entered the UK top 40 in August 1975 following the success of Tomorrow Belongs to Me.

It has been reissued separately on CD numerous times since 1985, and is also widely available on a 2-in-1 album, the other album being the group's debut Framed.

== Track listing ==
Side one
No.	Title	Writer(s)	Length
1.	"Swampsnake"	Alex Harvey, Hugh McKenna	4:54
2.	"Gang Bang"	Alex Harvey, Hugh McKenna	4:42
3.	"The Faith Healer"	Alex Harvey, Hugh McKenna	7:21

Side two
No.	Title	Writer(s)	Length
1.	"Giddy Up a Ding Dong"	Freddie Bell, Joey Lattanzi	3:14
2.	"Next"	Jacques Brel, Mort Shuman, Eric Blau	4:02
3.	"Vambo Marble Eye"	Alex Harvey, Hugh McKenna, Zal Cleminson, Chris Glen, Ted McKenna	4:25
4.	"The Last of the Teenage Idols"	Alex Harvey, Hugh McKenna, Zal Cleminson	7:15

== Personnel ==
=== The Sensational Alex Harvey Band ===
- Alex Harvey – lead vocals, guitar
- Zal Cleminson – guitar, backing vocals
- Chris Glen – bass guitar, backing vocals
- Hugh McKenna – electric piano, organ, grand piano, backing vocals
- Ted McKenna – drums, percussion, backing vocals
- Graham Smith (session musician) harmonica

=== Technical ===
- Phil Wainman – producer
- Pete Coleman – engineer
- John Mills – engineer
- David Batchelor – assistant producer, backing vocals
- Pip Williams – arrangements on "Swampsnake", "Gang Bang", "Next" and "The Last of the Teenage Idols"
- Dave Field – sleeve

== Cover versions ==
"Swampsnake" was covered by American rock band Zilch on their 1998 debut album 3.2.1..

"Faith Healer" has been recovered by several different performers. Foetus performed the song during a 1990 tour, documented on the 1992 album Male. Recoil covered "The Faith Healer" in 1992 on their album Bloodline with Douglas McCarthy of Nitzer Ebb on vocals. Other covers have been made by the Australian band The Church on their 1999 covers album A Box of Birds. In the same year, ex-Marillion singer Fish released his version on the album Raingods With Zippos. Heavy metal band Helloween also covered the song in their 1999 album Metal Jukebox, as did metal singer Udo Dirkschneider (Accept, U.D.O.) on his 2022 album of cover versions, My Way. Saxon recorded the song on their 2023 album of cover versions, More Inspirations.

== Charts ==
Chart (1975)	Peak position
UK Albums (OCC)	37

== Certifications ==
Region	Certification	Certified units/sales
United Kingdom (BPI)	Silver	60,000^{^}
^{^} Shipments figures based on certification alone.
