= Live (The Sensational Alex Harvey Band album) =

Live album by The Sensational Alex Harvey Band
- Released: September 1975
- Recorded: May 24th 1975
- Venue: Hammersmith Odeon, London
- Genre: Hard rock
- Length: 46:15
- Label: Vertigo (UK & Europe) and Atlantic (USA), 1986 LP released on Sahara Records, 2002 CD reissue released on Universal International
- Producer: The Sensational Alex Harvey Band, David Batchelor

The Sensational Alex Harvey Band chronology
Tomorrow Belongs to Me (1975)	Live (1975)	The Penthouse Tapes (1976)

Singles from Live
- 1. "Delilah" Released: July 18, 1975

Professional ratings
Review scores
Source	Rating
Allmusic	3/5 stars

Live was the first live record (fifth album overall) by The Sensational Alex Harvey Band, released in 1975. It features a cover version of the Tom Jones song "Delilah". Donald A. Guarisco of AllMusic writes "Live is a double-triumph for the Sensational Alex Harvey Band because it functions both as a strong live souvenir for the group's fans and also as a solid introduction to the group's highlights for the novice".

== Track listing ==
1. "Fanfare (Justly, Skillfully, Magnanimously)" (Derek Wadsworth) – 1:24
2. "Faith Healer" (Alex Harvey, Hugh McKenna) – 6:50
3. "Tomahawk Kid" (Harvey, David Batchelor, H. McKenna) – 5:50
4. "Vambo" (Harvey, H. McKenna) – 9:25
5. "Give My Compliments To The Chef" (Harvey, H. McKenna, Zal Cleminson) – 7:05
6. "Delilah" (Les Reed, Barry Mason) – 5:17
7. "Framed" (Jerry Leiber, Mike Stoller) – 11:04

== Personnel ==
=== The Sensational Alex Harvey Band ===
- Alex Harvey – lead vocals, guitar
- Zal Cleminson – guitar
- Chris Glen – bass guitar
- Hugh McKenna – keyboards, synthesizer
- Ted McKenna – drums

=== Technical ===
- David Batchelor – producer
- John Punter – engineer
- Dougie Thompson – assistant engineer
- Dave and Alan Field – sleeve
- Ian Dickson, Steve Joester, Tom Busby – cover photography

== Charts ==
Chart (1975)	Peak position
UK Albums (OCC)	14

== Certifications ==
Region	Certification	Certified units/sales
United Kingdom (BPI)	Silver	60,000^{^}
^{^} Shipments figures based on certification alone.
