= Zalvation =

Zalvation: Live In The 21st Century

Live album by The Sensational Alex Harvey Band
- Released: 2006
- Recorded: On the UK tour in 2005
- Genre: Rock
- Length: 92:32
- Label: Jerkin Crocus Records
- Producer: The Sensational Alex Harvey Band

The Sensational Alex Harvey Band chronology
| Rock Drill (1978) | Zalvation: Live In The 21st Century (2006) |

Professional ratings
Review scores
| Source | Rating |
|---|---|
| Allmusic | 3.5/5 stars |

Zalvation: Live In The 21st Century is a live album, released in 2006, which served as a The Sensational Alex Harvey Band reunion notwithstanding that Harvey himself had died in 1982. This was the third SAHB album to be made without Alex Harvey, the others being the band's seventh studio album, Fourplay and another reunion album Live in Glasgow 1993. This album features Max Maxwell on vocals, and sees the return of Hugh McKenna to the band, his last appearance being on the Fourplay album, for which he had been vocalist. The album commemorated a reunion tour, but was also intended as a farewell tour; however the tour had been so successful that the band decided to continue. The album release contains 2 CDs and comprises new versions of songs written or covered by the original SAHB. Although four fifths of the group on Zalvation were responsible for 1977's SAHB (without Alex) album Fourplay, no songs from this album are included.

Since the release of the reunion concert album, original guitarist, Zal Cleminson, left the band, replaced by Julian Saxby.

== Track listings ==
Disc 1

1. "Faith Healer" (Alex Harvey, Hugh McKenna) – 7:35
2. "Midnight Moses" (Phil O'Donnell) – 5:04
3. "Swampsnake" (Harvey, McKenna) – 5:46
4. "Next" (Jacques Brel, Mort Shuman, Eric Blau) – 4:54
5. "Isobel Goudie" (Harvey) – 7:50
6. "Framed" (Jerry Leiber, Mike Stoller) – 8:58

Disc 2

1. "Give My Compliments To The Chef" (Harvey, McKenna, Zal Cleminson) – 8:03
2. "Man In The Jar" (Harvey, Cleminson, Chris Glen, David Batchelor, McKenna) – 10:14
3. "Hammer Song" (Harvey) – 7:04
4. "Action Strasse" (Harvey, McKenna, Cleminson) – 5:43
5. "Vambo" (Harvey, McKenna, Cleminson) – 8:36
6. "Boston Tea Party" (Harvey, McKenna) – 6:31
7. "Delilah" (Barry Mason, Les Reed) – 6:14

== Personnel ==
=== The Sensational Alex Harvey Band ===
- "Mad" Max Maxwell – lead vocals
- Zal Cleminson – guitar
- Chris Glen – bass guitar
- Hugh McKenna – keyboards
- Ted McKenna – drums

=== Technical ===
- James Allen – producer
- Ben Strano, Dan Baird – mastering
- Brian Sweeney, Martin Kielty – photography
