= The Mafia Stole My Guitar =

Studio album by Alex Harvey
- Released: 1979
- Studios: Morgan, London
- Genre: Rock
- Length: 42:23
- Label: RCA
- Producers: Danny Beckerman, Matthew Cang

Alex Harvey chronology
Alex Harvey Presents: The Loch Ness Monster (1977)	The Mafia Stole My Guitar (1979)	Soldier on the Wall (1982)

The Mafia Stole My Guitar is a studio album by Alex Harvey. The earlier Alex Harvey Presents: The Loch Ness Monster was made while the rest of the Sensational Alex Harvey Band were recording Fourplay. The Mafia Stole My Guitar was the last album Harvey released during his lifetime; he died in 1982.

== Critical reception ==
Professional ratings
Review scores
Source	Rating
AllMusic	3/5 stars
The Encyclopedia of Popular Music	2/5 stars

The Canberra Times described the New Band as "a competent crew of old style blues-jazz orientated rock musicians" and suggested elements of the album were reminiscent of Colosseum and The Soft Machine. The Manchester Evening News deemed the album "gritty rock-rhythm and blues."

AllMusic called the album "the same unusual but intriguing blend of prog ambition and punk energy."

== Track listing ==
1. "Don's Delight" (Don Weller)
2. "Back in the Depot" (Alex Harvey, Matthew Cang)
3. "Wait for Me Mama" (Alex Harvey, Don Weller, Matthew Cang, Hugh McKenna)
4. "The Mafia Stole My Guitar" (Alex Harvey)
5. "Shakin' All Over" (Johnny Kidd)
6. "The Whalers (Thar She Blows)" (Alex Harvey, Matthew Cang, Hugh McKenna)
7. "Oh Spartacus!" (Alex Harvey, Matthew Cang)
8. "Just a Gigolo/I Ain't Got Nobody" (Irving Caesar, Julius Brammer/Leonello Casucci)

== Personnel ==
- Alex Harvey – lead vocals, lead guitar

The New Band

- Matthew Cang – lead guitar, keyboards, vocals
- Simon Charterton – drums, percussion, vocals
- Tommy Eyre – keyboards (main), vocals
- Gordon Sellar – bass guitar, vocals
- Don Weller – saxophone, horns on "Oh Spartacus!"

Technical

- Mike Hedges – engineer
- Mark Freegard – assistant engineer
