= Rock Drill =

Rock Drill or rock drill may refer to:

== Arts ==
- Rock Drill (Jacob Epstein), a 1913 sculpture by Jacob Epstein
- Rock Drill (Ezra Pound), a section of The Cantos, a 1956 work by Ezra Pound
- Rock Drill (album), a 1978 album by Sensational Alex Harvey Band
- "Rock Drill", a 2006 song by The Chemical Brothers

== Other uses ==
- Rock drill, a tool
