= SAHB =

SAHB may refer to:

- Sélestat Alsace Handball
- The Sensational Alex Harvey Band
  - SAHB Stories, a 1976 album by the band
