= Rock Drill (album) =

Studio album by The Sensational Alex Harvey Band
- Released: March 1978
- Recorded: 1977
- Studio: Maison Rouge Mobile, Ridge Farm, Dorking; Basing Street, London
- Genre: Hard rock, glam rock
- Length: 37:13
- Label: Mountain, 2002 CD reissue released on Mercury
- Producer: The Sensational Alex Harvey Band

The Sensational Alex Harvey Band chronology
Fourplay (1977)	Rock Drill (1978)	Zalvation (2006)

Singles from Rock Drill
- 1. "Mrs. Blackhouse" Released: August 26, 1977

Rock Drill is the eighth studio album by The Sensational Alex Harvey Band, which was released in Europe in 1977 and in the UK in 1978. The album includes Tommy Eyre on keyboards; the band's original keyboardist Hugh McKenna was absent due to an internal dispute - however, three songs from the album are co-credited to him. McKenna has since recorded his regrets at the dispute, given what lay ahead in the next five years.

Zal Cleminson rates "The Dolphins" as one of the best things SAHB ever produced, next to "Faith Healer" and "Give My Compliments To The Chef". One track recorded during the Rock Drill session that was not included on the finished album is "Engine Room Boogie". The track ended up as the B-side of SAHB's final single release "Mrs. Blackhouse" (1977 Mountain - Cat No: TOP 32). The band performed "Mrs. Blackhouse" and "Engine Room Boogie" at the 1977 Reading Festival on Sunday 28 August with Tommy Eyre on keyboards.

The album was re-released on CD, both coupled as a 2-in-1 album with SAHB Stories and as an individual CD.

== Artwork ==
The album cover shows the Torso in Metal from Rock Drill, a revised version of Sir Jacob Epstein's challenging 1913 sculpture The Rock Drill, symbolising mankind's descent into a human-machine hybrid. Alex Harvey found this statue deeply moving and it influenced the entire "Rock Drill Suite".

== "No Complaints Department" ==
"No Complaints Department" was the last song SAHB ever recorded in the studio and Harvey broke down in tears after he finished it. The UK release of Rock Drill was originally to include "No Complaints Department", which appeared on the German and Norwegian Vertigo releases of the album (Cat No: 6370 423) but it was later pulled before the album was released on Mountain Records (TOPS 114). It also appeared on the 1987 CD compilation Portrait (Start STFCD1) where it was incorrectly listed as "Mrs. Blackhouse". The Portrait CD was also released on LP and cassette in the UK, both containing "No Complaints Department" (listed as "Mrs. Blackhouse"). The French issue of this CD (pressed by MPO) contains the song "Mrs. Blackhouse" as listed.

The melody and structure of the song was inspired by a poem by Rudyard Kipling called "The Ladies". Jimmie Grimes (bassist with Alex's Soulband in the 1950s and 60s) adapted the poem, composed music for it and retitled it "I Learned About Women" (credited to Kipling/Grimes), which Harvey recorded on his 1964 solo LP The Blues (Polydor HI FI 46 441 [mono] & SLPHM 237 641 [stereo]). In 1977 Harvey took the music from this song and wrote the lyrics of "No Complaints Department" over it. In November 1977 Mountain Records was planning to release the song as a single "No Complaints Department" b/w "Anthem" (1977 Mountain - Cat No: TOP 34). Alan Freeman played an acetate of the single on his Saturday Show and announced that it would be SAHB's "new single." However, Harvey was afraid of upsetting his parents, Leslie and Margaret with the lyrics "My brother was killed on the stage" and phoned up Jimmie Grimes telling him NOT to sign the publishing rights clearance form. Grimes was offered money by Mountain Records, but he stuck to his guns and refused to sign. The single had to be pulled. Unfortunately, copies of the Rock Drill sleeve had been printed on Mountain listing "No Complaints Department" on Side Two. The album, due for release in November 1977 in the UK was held up and had to be re-pressed with a replacement track "Mrs. Blackhouse" on it. Rock Drill was finally released in the UK in March 1978 (Mountain - Cat No: TOPS 114). Some early UK white label test pressings of Rock Drill contain "No Complaints Department", but an actual finished British copy of the album on the Mountain label has never been seen containing the track to this day (although the sleeve has an amendment sticker over the Side Two listing stating "Mrs. Blackhouse"). In late 1977 Rock Drill was released on Vertigo in Germany and Norway containing "No Complaints Department", but the album was quickly withdrawn and replaced by copies with "Mrs. Blackhouse" on them. The acetate of the single played by Alan Freeman is the original mix of the song. The David Batchelor-remixed version of "No Complaints Department" appears on the UK edition of Portrait (LP/CD/cassette), the UK white label test pressing of Rock Drill and the German and Norwegian pressings of the album. "No Complaints Department" never reached the pressing stage as an actual single.

=== Lyrics ===
"I've seen stars disappear in a hurry, overdoses of satin and silk" - this refers to the death of Elvis Presley who died as a result of stardom and rich living.

"Some others who can't feed their children coz they don't have the money for milk" - a reference to Margaret Thatcher who, as Education Secretary, abolished free school milk for primary school children and became known as "Thatcher the milk snatcher".

"So my best friend died in a plane crash, my brother was killed on the stage, so don't be upset if I'm angry and seem in some kind of a rage" - refers to the death of Alex's manager and best friend Bill Fehilly, who was killed in a plane crash in 1976. Also, a reference to Harvey's younger brother Leslie who was electrocuted onstage with Stone The Crows on 3 May 1972 at the Swansea Top Rank ballroom when he touched a live microphone.

"There is no complaints department, it's only up to you..." - the chorus means that there is no point complaining about bad things that happen in your life. It's up to you to deal with it yourself.

"I've got friends who are armed with magnums, they don't get their money from me, coz it never is no kind of pleasure to see somebody suffer you see" - a reference to Alex's minder/bodyguard John Miller, who once tried to capture Ronnie Biggs and bring him to justice.

"They took my old pal to the madhouse, in horror and fear and in pain, with surgery done in a hurry to do a transplant in his brain" - refers to former Soulband guitarist Robert Nimmo, who suffered for many years with psychological problems.

== Reception ==
Professional ratings
Review scores
Source	Rating
Allmusic	1.5/5 stars

== Track listing ==
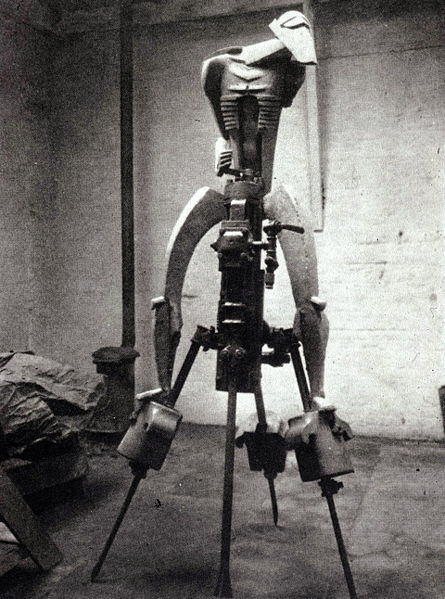
Epstein's 1913 sculpture The Rock Drill in its original form; subsequently destroyed

The Rock Drill Suite

1. (i) "Rock Drill" (Alex Harvey, Tommy Eyre) – 6:22
2. (ii) "The Dolphins" (Harvey, Alistair "Zal" Cleminson, Chris Glen, Hugh McKenna) – 6:10
3. (iii) "Rock 'n' Rool" (Harvey, Cleminson, Hugh McKenna) – 3:40
4. (iv) "King Kong" (Max Steiner) – 3:15
5. "Booids" (Traditional; arranged by Harvey, Cleminson, Glen, Edward McKenna, Eyre) – 1:38
6. "Who Murdered Sex?" (Harvey, Cleminson, Eyre) – 5:16
7. "Nightmare City" (Harvey) – 3:48
8. "Water Beastie" (Harvey, Glen, Hugh McKenna) – 4:50
9. "Mrs. Blackhouse" (Harvey) – 3:34
10. "No Complaints Department" (Harvey, Jimmie Grimes; pre-release issue) – 5:03

== Personnel ==
=== Sensational Alex Harvey Band ===
- Alex Harvey – lead vocals, guitar, trumpet
- Zal Cleminson – guitar, vocals
- Tommy Eyre – keyboards, vocals
- Chris Glen – bass guitar, vocals
- Ted McKenna – drums, vocals

=== Technical ===
- Guy Bidmead – engineer
- David Batchelor – mixing
- Peter Higgins, Chris Horler, Chris L. Urca, Ian Dickson, Steve Joester – photography
- Sir Jacob Epstein – artwork; torso in metal from the "Rock Drill"
