= Fourplay (The Sensational Alex Harvey Band album) =

Studio album by The Sensational Alex Harvey Band
- Released: February 1977
- Recorded: 1977
- Studio: Basing Street, London; AIR, London
- Genre: Rock
- Length: 41:58
- Label: Mountain
- Producer: The Sensational Alex Harvey Band (without Alex), John Punter

The Sensational Alex Harvey Band chronology
| SAHB Stories (1976) | Fourplay (1977) | Rock Drill (1978) |

Singles from Fourplay
- 1. "Pick It Up and Kick It" Released: January 28, 1977

Professional ratings
Review scores
| Source | Rating |
|---|---|
| Allmusic | 1.5/5 stars |

Fourplay is the seventh studio album by The Sensational Alex Harvey Band, and the first of the group's albums to be made without Alex Harvey: the band was identified as "SAHB (Without Alex)" on the album cover. Harvey had quit the group and was recording another album called Alex Harvey Presents: The Loch Ness Monster at the time. Most of the group had recorded two albums under the name Tear Gas in the early 1970s, and John Neil Munro states in his 2002 book The Sensational Alex Harvey that they had been planning to record without Harvey for at least a year prior to the split. Harvey helped to select songs for the album and contributed some production assistance. Some songs, such as "Smouldering" and "Outer Boogie" had been road-tested by the group during portions of shows for their 1976 tour of Europe during which Harvey was required to rest. In 2004, Ted McKenna told John Clarkson:

We were big fans of bands like Little Feat... Alex would always say ‘Well, what’s the point in doing that ?’ He was right because we were playing material that had been already done by the Americans. Although we were pretty good at it, and a lot of Scottish bands, like the Average White Band, are good at soul and funk music and we had a flair also for that kind of thing, it wouldn’t have got us anywhere because it was emulating other styles of music too much. Alex’s one hand was to make us go in his direction.

Fourplay was released in 1977 on vinyl and cassette. Although Harvey is not on the album, he is pictured on the back tied up with string and gagged behind a huge case with "The Sensational Alex Harvey Band" written on it, while in the background the other four members appear to be singing into a microphone, facing away from him. Zal Cleminson eschewed his familiar make-up during this iteration of the group.

"Pick It Up and Kick It" / "Smouldering" was released as the lead single in January 1977, and promoted on their debut Old Grey Whistle Test performance. Fourplay was forced to compete with a nominal 'best of' SAHB album, Vambo Rools: 'Big Hits and Close Shaves' as well as Harvey's own Loch Ness Monster album, during 1977. Less than eight months after the release of Fourplay, Harvey was working with a new version of the band again and a new SAHB album Rock Drill was released before the end of the year. Between Fourplay and Rock Drill, however, Hugh McKenna — who had been a major songwriting force in SAHB — left the group.

Fourplay is much more polished and radio-friendly than much of the conventional SAHB material. It is perhaps for this reason, but more likely due to the absence of Harvey (though he clearly condoned it), it is generally regarded as 'non-canon'. However, it was reissued twice on vinyl in the UK (in 1984 and 1986) and twice on CD in Germany (in 1994 and 1997). There has been no further official CD release since that time, and it was not included in the extensive CD retrospective from 2016, Last of the Teenage Idols. The Sensational Alex Harvey Band would perform, and release live albums, after Harvey's death but their performances would concentrate on material he co-wrote and performed with them, most notably the double live CD Zalvation in 2005.

== Track listing ==
1. "Smouldering" (Hugh McKenna, Chris Glen) – 5:30
2. "Chase It into The Night" (H. McKenna, Zal Cleminson) – 5:28
3. "Shake Your Way to Heaven" (Cleminson) – 5:09
4. "Outer Boogie" (Ted McKenna, H. McKenna, Glen, Cleminson) – 5:00
5. "Big Boy" (Cleminson) – 4:54
6. "Pick It Up and Kick It" (H. McKenna, Cleminson) – 4:25
7. "Love You For a Life Time" (H. McKenna) – 5:09
8. "Too Much American Pie" (T. McKenna, H. McKenna, Glen, Cleminson) – 6:16

== Personnel ==
=== Sensational Alex Harvey Band (without Alex) ===
- Hugh McKenna – keyboards, lead vocals
- Chris Glen – bass guitar
- Ted McKenna – drums, vocals on track 4
- Zal Cleminson – guitar, vocals on track 5

=== Technical ===
- John Punter – co-producer, engineer
- Geoff Halpin – design
- Roger Stowell, Steve Joester – photography
- Mike Doud – art direction
