= My Kind of Love =

My Kind of Love may refer to several songs:

- "My Kinda Love", 1929 song by Alter and Trent, also recorded as "My Kind of Love" by Sarah Vaughan in 1964
- "My Kind Of Love", 1961 single by The Satintones
- "My Kind Of Lovin", 1965 single by Alex Harvey and the Soul Band from Alex Harvey and His Soul Band
- "My Kind Of Love", 1968 single by Dave Dudley
- "My Kind Of Love", 1969 single and album by Poco
- "My Kind of Love" (song), 2012 song by Emeli Sandé
