= A Shot in the West =

2006 film

- DVD Front Cover
- Directed by: Robert Kelly
- Written by: Justin Burns; Robert Kelly
- Starring: Alexander Watson; Zal Cleminson; David Hayman; Ewan Black
- Edited by: John Maguire
- Music by: Stephen Maguire and The Sensational Alex Harvey Band
- Release date: 16 July 2006
- Running time: 26 minutes
- Language: English

A Shot in the West is a 2006 low budget Western short film shot in the rundown council estate of Drumchapel, Glasgow. The film was written, directed and edited by three friends (Justin Burns, Bob Kelly and John Maguire). All sound and camera equipment was borrowed from a local community group. Many interior shots were filmed at a local public house, where the crew were allowed to take over the function suite for two and a half days. Catering was supplied by a local bakery. Costumes were either borrowed or provided by the cast.

Once most elements were in place producer/director Bob Kelly approached actor David Hayman to ask for advice. However, David was so impressed by Bob's enthusiasm and progress he offered to star in the movie. On the same day Zal Cleminson and Chris Glen from The Sensational Alex Harvey Band were with David Hayman. Being musicians they asked about the soundtrack. Bob informed them the soundtrack would be created by another friend, Stephen Maguire. They offered to help and a meeting and jam session with Stephen was set up. Stephen and The Sensational Alex Harvey Band got on well, so agreed to work on the soundtrack together.

== Plot ==
The film follows a lonesome desperado known only as "Gold Bullet" as he arrives in a small western town 'Last Valley' populated by thugs, rogues, gunslingers and businessmen. "Gold Bullet" is in town for one reason only, to collect a debt owed to him by a former employer Henry Wynn. Will Wynn give up the money or will it all end in bloodshed?

== Cast ==
- Alexander Watson ... Gold Bullet
- Zal Cleminson ... Wilson
- David Hayman ... Henry Wynn
- Ewan Black ... Borrachonne
- Robert Kelly ... Gunslinger #1
- Duncan Wilson ... Gunslinger #2
- Harry Garrity ... Town Drunk

== Soundtrack ==
- A Couple Pieces of Silver - Stephen Maguire and The Sensational Alex Harvey Band
- Dressed to Kill - Alexander Watson and The Sensational Alex Harvey Band
