= John Neil Munro =

John Neil Munro, Scottish journalist and biographer.

== Background ==
John Neil Munro was born in Campbeltown, Argyll and Bute, and grew up in Stornoway, Isle of Lewis. He studied Modern and Economic History at the University of Glasgow and then postgraduate journalism in Cardiff.

== Writing ==
In the 1990s Munro worked as a journalist for various UK newspapers, including The Glasgow Herald.

=== Works ===
- The Sensational Alex Harvey (Firefly Publishing, 2002), a biography of Glasgow rock star Alex Harvey
- Some People Are Crazy - The John Martyn Story (Berlinn, 2007. ISBN 1846970369; 2011, ISBN 9781846971655), biography of John Martyn with a foreword by Scots crime writer Ian Rankin
- When George Came to Edinburgh (Berlinn, 2010), George Best's time at Hibernian F.C.
- Lust for Life! Irvine Welsh and the Trainspotting Phenomenon (Polygon, 2013, ISBN 9781846972423), Irvine Welsh and the impact of his first novel, Trainspotting
