= Rock Drill (Jacob Epstein) =

Sculpture by Jacob Epstein

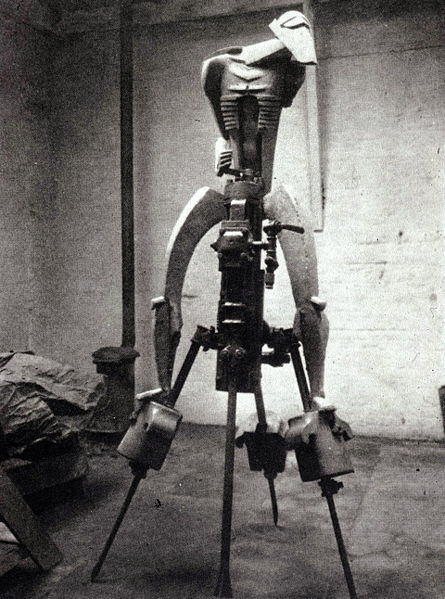
- The original work, displayed at Brighton City Art Gallery, December 1913 to January 1914
- Artist: Jacob Epstein
- Year: 1913–1916
- Catalogue: Silber, Evelyn, The Sculpture of Jacob Epstein, 1986
- Type: Sculpture
- Medium: Plaster figure mounted on actual rock drill
- Dimensions: 205 cm × 141.5 cm (81 in × 55.7 in)
- Condition: Original destroyed by the sculptor (Reconstructed in 1974)

Rock Drill (c. 1913–1915) and the associated Torso in Metal from Rock Drill (c. 1913–1916) are Jacob Epstein's most radical sculptures.

== Composition ==
Rock Drill comprises a plaster figure perched on top of an actual rock drill. The combination of an industrial rock drill and the carved plaster figure makes the artwork an example of a "Readymade" created at the same time as Marcel Duchamp's Bicycle Wheel (1913). A 1974 reconstruction, by Ken Cook and Ann Christopher, is part of the Birmingham Museum and Art Gallery's collection. Rock Drill has been heralded as embodying the spirit of "radical Modernism more dramatically than any other sculpture, English or continental, then or since".

Jacob Epstein (1880–1959) was an American-born sculptor who had moved to Europe in 1902, and taken British citizenship in 1911. Although Epstein was not officially a member of the Vorticists, not having signed the Vorticist Manifesto, the full-figure sculpture has also been hailed as the pinnacle of Vorticist art. Originally a positive statement, Rock Drill stood as a celebration of modern machinery and masculine virility. Wyndham Lewis described the sculpture as 'one of the best things he [Epstein] has done. The nerve-like figure perched on the machinery, with its straining to one purpose, is a vivid illustration of the greatest function of life.'

In 1940, however, recalling the horrors of the 1914–18 war in the context of the Second World War, Epstein reinterpreted the sculpture much more negatively:

My ardour for machinery (short-lived) expended itself upon the purchase of an actual drill, second-hand, and upon it I made and mounted a machine-like robot, visored, menacing, and carrying within itself its progeny, protectively ensconced. Here is the armed sinister figure of to-day and to-morrow. No humanity, only the terrible Frankenstein's monster we have made ourselves into.

== Study ==
Study for Rock Drill (c. 1913) is a 67.5 cm (26.6 in) × 42.5 cm (16.7 in) charcoal drawing by Epstein which is part of The Garman Ryan Collection at The New Art Gallery Walsall. Whilst the exact date of the sketch is unknown, because it is a preparatory study for Epstein's full sculpture Rock Drill, it has been dated to 1913.

== Torso in Metal ==
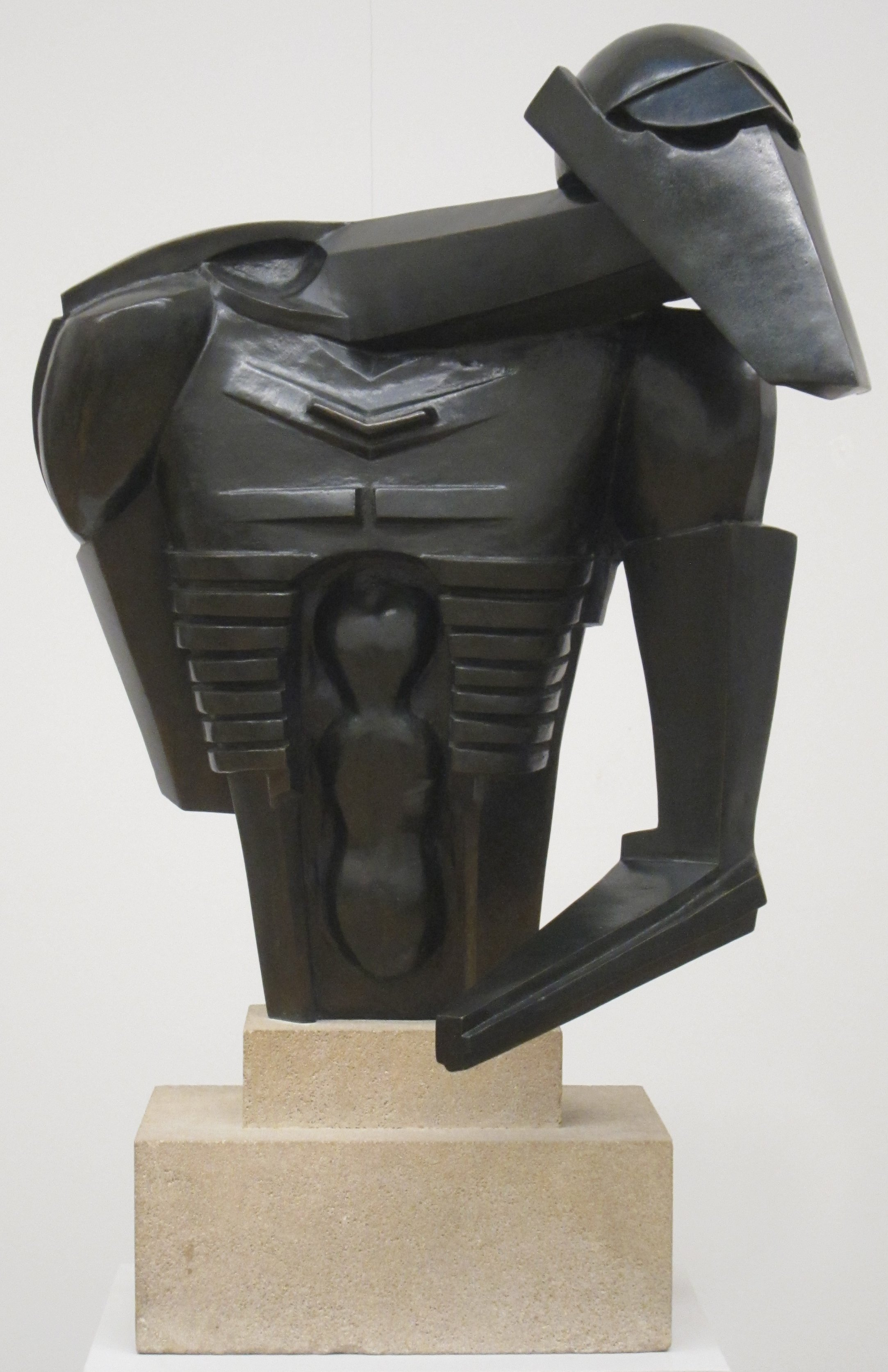
Torso in Metal, at Tate Britain

Epstein dismantled the original sculpture: he sold the drill and truncated the figure. When he exhibited the radically transformed Torso in Metal from Rock Drill in 1916, he had evidently turned his back on his 'experimental pre-war days of 1913'. In contrast to the power and virility exuded by the full-figure, the truncated version appears defenceless and melancholic, evocative of the wounded soldiers who were returning home from the trenches in startling numbers. Torso in Metal from Rock Drill is now at Tate Britain, Auckland Art Gallery in New Zealand and the National Gallery of Canada in Ottawa, Ontario.

== Legacy ==
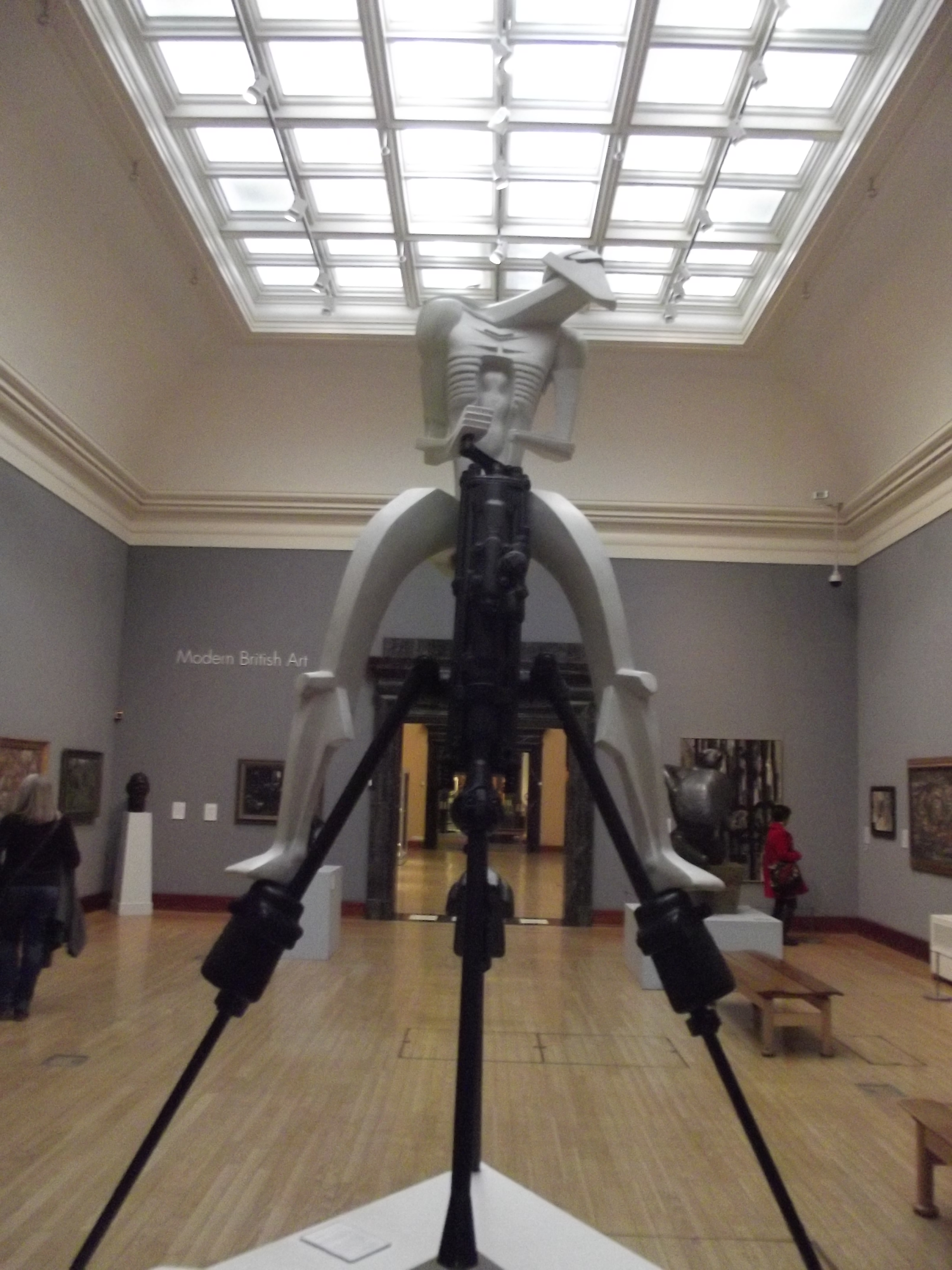
The 1974 reproduction, at Birmingham

Epstein's dismantling of Rock Drill and truncation of the abstracted male form marks a crucial turning point in his career, signalling the end of his engagement with the machine age. Although Epstein destroyed the original sculpture, since its reconstruction in 1974, Rock Drill has been heralded as representing 'a dramatic, revolutionary moment when sculpture in Britain first became uncompromisingly modern.' Epstein had a long and successful career in Britain, working in less radical styles, and notable for portrait busts and architectural sculptures.

The final Sensational Alex Harvey Band studio album, 1978's Rock Drill, was named after and influenced by the sculpture. Its cover depicts the Torso.

In September 2006, Tate Modern asked a number of contemporary musicians to compose music about a piece of their choosing from the gallery's collection, under the project name Tate Tracks. The Chemical Brothers recorded "Rock Drill", inspired by Torso..., and this could be heard on headphones next to the sculpture. From October 2006, it also became available for a while, on the Tate Tracks website.

Comparisons have been drawn between the sculpture and the Star Wars character General Grievous and his battle droids.

== See also ==
- List of sculptures by Jacob Epstein
