= SAHB Stories =

Studio album by The Sensational Alex Harvey Band
- Released: July 1976
- Recorded: 1976
- Studio: Basing Street, London
- Genre: Rock
- Length: 37:15
- Label: Mountain (UK), Vertigo (Europe), 2002 CD reissue released on Mercury
- Producer: The Sensational Alex Harvey Band, David Batchelor

The Sensational Alex Harvey Band chronology
The Penthouse Tapes (1976)	SAHB Stories (1976)	Fourplay (1977)

Singles from SAHB Stories
- 1. "Boston Tea Party" Released: May 28, 1976; 2. "Amos Moses" Released: August 27, 1976

Professional ratings
Review scores
Source	Rating
Allmusic	3/5 stars

SAHB Stories (pronounced "Sob Stories") is the sixth studio album by The Sensational Alex Harvey Band, released in 1976. It features their hit single "Boston Tea Party", as well as a cover of the Jerry Reed song "Amos Moses". Harvey left the band shortly after this album was released, but returned in 1977. The album was re-released in 1984 on the Sahara Records label.

== Track listings ==
1. "Dance To Your Daddy" (David Batchelor, SAHB) – 5:43
2. "Amos Moses" (Jerry Reed) – 5:20
3. "Jungle Rub Out" (Batchelor, SAHB) – 4:25
4. "Sirocco" (Hugh McKenna) – 6:50
5. "Boston Tea Party" (Alex Harvey, Hugh McKenna) – 4:36
6. "Sultan's Choice" (Harvey, Zal Cleminson) – 4:06
7. "$25 for a Massage" (Harvey, Chris Glen, Cleminson) – 3:22
8. "Dogs of War" (Harvey, Hugh McKenna, Cleminson) – 6:10

== Personnel ==
=== Sensational Alex Harvey Band ===
- Alex Harvey – lead vocals, guitar
- Zal Cleminson – guitar
- Chris Glen – bass guitar
- Hugh McKenna – keyboards, synthesizer
- Ted McKenna – drums

=== Technical ===
- David Batchelor – producer
- Phill Brown – engineer
- John Punter – mixing
- Gered Mankowitz – photography
- Mike Doud – art direction

== Charts ==
Chart (1976)	Peak position
Australian Albums (Kent Music Report)	98
Finnish Albums (The Official Finnish Charts)	6
Swedish Albums (Sverigetopplistan)	33
UK Albums (OCC)	11

== Certifications ==
Region	Certification	Certified units/sales
United Kingdom (BPI)	Silver	60,000^{^}
^{^} Shipments figures based on certification alone.
