= Alex Harvey (musician) =

Scottish rock musician (1935–1982)

Background information
- Born: Alexander James Harvey; 5 February 1935; Glasgow, Scotland
- Died: 4 February 1982 (aged 46) Zeebrugge, West Flanders, Belgium
- Genres: Hard rock; glam rock; blues rock; rock and roll; R&B; soul
- Occupations: Musician; songwriter
- Instruments: Vocals; guitar
- Years active: 1954–1982
- Labels: Vertigo; Polygram; Buddah
- Formerly of: The Sensational Alex Harvey Band; His Soul Band; Rock Workshop; Giant Moth; The New Band

Alexander James Harvey (5 February 1935 – 4 February 1982) was a Scottish rock and blues musician. Although his career spanned almost three decades, he is best remembered as the frontman of the Sensational Alex Harvey Band, with whom he built a reputation as an exciting live performer during the era of glam rock in the 1970s.

== Biography ==
Harvey was born and raised in the working-class Kinning Park district of Glasgow (also reported as the Gorbals in the 2009 STV show The Greatest Scot). By his own account, he worked in a number of jobs, from carpentry to being a waiter at a restaurant to carving gravestones, before finding success in music. He first began performing in skiffle groups in 1954. On Friday, 20 May 1960, at the Town Hall in Alloa, Alex Harvey and his Big Beat Band opened for Johnny Gentle and His Group, "His Group" being the Beatles (John, Paul, George, Stuart Sutcliffe and Tommy Moore), on this the opening night – and biggest audience – of the Beatles' seven-date tour of Scotland with Gentle.

His musical roots were in Dixieland jazz and skiffle music, which enjoyed considerable popularity in Britain during the late 1950s. From 1958 until 1965, he was the leader of Alex Harvey's Big Soul Band, playing blues and rock and roll songs, and spending considerable time touring in the United Kingdom and Germany. He also won a competition that sought "Scotland's answer to Tommy Steele". Harvey became strongly identified with British rhythm and blues music, although he was equally able to play rock songs.

After leaving the Big Soul Band, he briefly tried for a solo career but with little success. By 1967, he found a positive direction for his career when he became a member of the pit band in the London stage production of the musical Hair. This band recorded the live album Hair Rave Up Live From the Shaftesbury Theatre, which contained Harvey originals and other songs not from the stage show. In 1970, Harvey formed Rock Workshop with Ray Russell; their first, self-titled album contained an early version of "Hole in Her Stocking", later to appear on Framed. Harvey remained with Hair for five years.

Harvey was instrumental in the formation of the band Stone the Crows by introducing his younger brother Leslie "Les" Harvey to singer Maggie Bell. Also in Stone the Crows was bassist James Dewar, who later worked with Robin Trower. Les Harvey was fatally electrocuted in a freak accident while performing with the band in 1972.

== The Sensational Alex Harvey Band ==
In 1972, Harvey formed the Sensational Alex Harvey Band (often shortened to SAHB) with guitarist Zal Cleminson, bassist Chris Glen, and cousins Hugh (keyboards) and Ted McKenna (drums), all previous members of progressive rock act Tear Gas.

SAHB produced a succession of highly regarded albums and tours throughout the 1970s. The Sensational Alex Harvey Band had top 40 hits in Britain with the single "Delilah", a cover version of the Tom Jones hit, which reached number seven in 1975, and also with "The Boston Tea Party" in June 1976. The band never achieved acclaim in the United States the way it did in Great Britain, but it had a cult following in certain US cities, especially Cleveland, where the group first played at the Agora Ballroom in December 1974. Thanks to airplay from WMMS, songs like "Next" and "The Faith Healer" became popular. Cleveland remained a city where the Sensational Alex Harvey Band had a devoted following. However, they were unable to replicate that popularity in most other US cities.

After Harvey left the group in 1976, the other members continued as SAHB (Without Alex) producing the album Fourplay. Harvey re-joined the group for 1978's Rock Drill but left again permanently shortly afterwards.

== Single, solo albums and death ==
After he left the band for good, he released two more solo albums and went on tour with his solo band from 1979. On 4 February 1982, as he was preparing to return from Belgium following a concert tour of Europe, Harvey died from a heart attack, a day before his 47th birthday.

== Personal life ==
Harvey was married twice, first to Mary Martin, with whom he had a son and second to Trudy, with whom he also had a son. He was a cousin of Willie Gardner.

Harvey was a Master Mason in Lodge Union, No. 332, in the City of Glasgow, in Scotland. He was initiated on 22 June 1955 and was passed to the Second Degree in Freemasonry on 24 August 1955. He received his Third Degree on 16 November 1955.

== Legacy ==
In 2002, a biography of Harvey by John Neil Munro was published: The Sensational Alex Harvey. The Sensational Alex Harvey Band were voted the fifth greatest Scottish band of all time in a 2005 survey. On 4 February 2012, a rowan tree was planted in memory of Harvey on the grounds of the People's Palace museum in Glasgow. The tree was planted by Alex Harvey Junior and the remaining members of the band. A limited edition book entitled Alex Harvey: Last of the Teenage Idols, photographed by Janet Macoska and edited by Martin Kielty was released for the 30th anniversary of his death.

Two novels by Christopher Brookmyre, The Sacred Art of Stealing and A Snowball in Hell, reference SAHB's work.

On 18 March 2016, Universal Music released a 14-disc box set of Harvey's work, entitled The Last of the Teenage Idols. This multi-disc set was the most comprehensive compilation of Harvey's music to date, including many rare and out-of-print titles.

In 2026, Good Evening Boys And Girls, a 21-CD limited edition live box set featuring 16 previously-unreleased live shows, a signed photo, hardback book and replica tour programme was released on the Madfish label) (2026)

== Discography ==
=== Solo artist ===
==== Studio albums ====
- The Blues (1964)
- Roman Wall Blues (1969)
- The Joker Is Wild (1972)
- The Mafia Stole My Guitar (1979)
- Soldier on the Wall (1982)

==== Singles ====
- "Agent OO Soul" / "Go Away Baby" (1965) Fontana: TF 610
- "Do the Dog" / "Something You Got" (1966) GTA Records: PO 40018
- "My Girl Slooping" / "Mashed Potatoes" (1966) GTA Records: PO 40019
- "Work Song" / "I Can Do Without Your Love" (1966) Fontana: TF 764
- "Maybe Some Day" / "Curtains for My Baby (St. James Infirmary)" (1967) Decca
- "The Sunday Song" (1967) Decca
- "Midnight Moses" (1969) Fontana
- "Alex Harvey Talks About Everything (An In-Depth Session with Alex Harvey of the Sensational Alex Harvey Band)" (1974) Vertigo: MK 71974
- "Runaway" (1976) Vertigo
- "Mitzi" (1984) Victoria: VIC-117, 10.282
- "Runaway" (1976, remastered 2002) Vertigo
- "Midnight Moses" (2015) Fontana: 535 854-6

==== Live albums ====
- Hair Rave Up Live From the Shaftesbury Theatre (1969)
- Alex Harvey Talks About Everything (1974)
- Alex Harvey Presents: The Loch Ness Monster (1977)
- BBC Radio 1 Live in Concert (1991) (recorded for the BBC at The Paris Theatre 1972 and The Hippodrome 1973)
- Live on the Test (1995)
- The Gospel According to Alex Harvey (1998)
- British Tour '76 (2004)
- Live at the BBC (2009)
- Good Evening Boys And Girls 21-disc limited edition live box set featuring 16 previously unreleased live shows, on the Madfish label) (2026)

=== Alex Harvey and His Soul Band ===
- Alex Harvey and His Soul Band (1964)

=== The Sensational Alex Harvey Band ===
- Framed (1972)
- Next... (1973)
- The Impossible Dream (1974)
- Tomorrow Belongs to Me (1975)
- Live (1975) (live at Hammersmith Odeon, London on 24 May 1975)
- The Penthouse Tapes (1976)
- SAHB Stories (1976)
- Rock Drill (1978)
- The Best of The Sensational Alex Harvey Band (1982)

=== Compilations/other records ===
- Band on the Wagon (1969)
- Hot City (recorded in 1974; released in 2009)
- Alex Harvey and His Soul Band, 20 unreleased tracks, CD only (1999)
- Teenage a Go Go - The Unreleased Recordings of Alex Harvey 1963-67 (Alchemy Entertainment 2003)
- Last of the Teenage Idols (2016) - a 14-CD/217-track box set including 21 previously unreleased songs, 59 songs on cd for the 1st time and a number of rare recordings plus a hardback book of photographs
