= The Blues (Alex Harvey album) =

Studio album by Alex Harvey
- Released: 1964
- Recorded: 8–10 May 1964 at Studio Rahlstedt, Hamburg
- Genre: Blues
- Length: 35:42
- Label: Polydor

Alex Harvey chronology
Alex Harvey and His Soul Band (1964)	The Blues (1964)	Roman Wall Blues (1969)

Professional ratings
Review scores
Source	Rating
Allmusic	3/5 stars

The Blues is the second album by Alex Harvey, released in 1964. Harvey was accompanied by his brother Les Harvey.

Originally The Blues would have been the third album, but Polydor did not release the second one (20 unreleased songs were put to CD in 1999). Rumour has it that Alex was not happy about this. He fulfilled his contract, but paid them back with a commercial disaster by making this acoustic album. The sleeve notes on the back tell that it was the idea of Paul Murphy to make the album, but it was Alex who insisted, and Polydor had to agree.

== Track listing ==
Side one

1. "Trouble in Mind" (Richard M. Jones)
2. "Honey Bee" (Muddy Waters)
3. "I Learned About Women" (Rudyard Kipling, Sammy Grimes)
4. "Danger Zone" (Percy Mayfield)
5. "The Riddle Song" (Traditional; arranged by Alex Harvey)
6. "Waltzing Matilda" (Banjo Paterson, Marie Cowan)
7. "T.B. Blues" (Jimmie Rodgers)

Side two

1. "The Big Rock Candy Mountain" (Traditional; arranged by Alex Harvey)
2. "The Michigan Massacre" (Woody Guthrie)
3. "No Peace" (Alex Harvey, Leslie Harvey)
4. "Nobody Knows You When You're Down and Out" (Jimmy Cox)
5. "St. James Infirmary" (Joe Primrose)
6. "Strange Fruit" (Lewis Allan)
7. "Kisses Sweeter Than Wine" (Joel Newman, Paul Campbell)
8. "Good God Almighty" (Alex Harvey, Leslie Harvey)

== Personnel ==
- Alex Harvey – vocals, guitar
- Leslie Harvey – guitar
