= Tommy Eyre =

British musician (1949–2001)

Tommy Eyre (5 June 1949 – 23 May 2001) was an English session keyboardist from Sheffield, England, who appeared on records by Joe Cocker, John Martyn, Gary Moore, Michael Schenker Group, the Sensational Alex Harvey Band, Greg Lake, B.B. King, John Mayall, Ian Gillan, Gerry Rafferty, Tracy Chapman and Wham! He played on Joe Cocker's UK chart-topper "With a Little Help from My Friends", on which he arranged the distinctive organ introduction, and Gerry Rafferty's "Baker Street" and "Right Down the Line".

== Career ==
Eyre began piano lessons at the age of four and started playing guitar when he was in his teens. In 1968, he joined Joe Cocker's Grease Band where he played the organ on "With a Little Help from My Friends". In the same year, Eyre moved to London to work with the Aynsley Dunbar Retaliation and later with Dunbar's next rock band called Blue Whale. After a short period with the band Juicy Lucy, Eyre joined the duo Mark-Almond and played on two of their albums. After that, in 1972, Eyre and bassist Roger Sutton resumed their own project Strabismus which they had started in 1969, and which was now called Riff Raff. With Riff Raff Eyre recorded three albums, one of them not being released until 2001.

Together with singer Alan Marshall from Riff Raff, Eyre joined the band ZZebra in 1974 for their first album, replacing keyboardist and singer Gus Yeadon. Eyre played on some of the tracks but is not credited on the album. With Zzebra he recorded a second album in 1975. In August 1977, Eyre became a member of The Sensational Alex Harvey Band, with whom he stayed until 1979. After that, Eyre recorded an album with John Martyn and did a promotion tour with him in 1980. In June 1981, he joined Greg Lake for his solo project, and in 1982 became a member of Gary Moore's studio and touring band.

== Wham! ==
One of Eyre's longest and most successful associations was with the duo Wham!, for whom he became musical director. His works with Wham! include the successful album Make It Big in 1984 with the singles "Wake Me Up Before You Go-Go", "Freedom", "Everything She Wants", and George Michael's solo record "Careless Whisper". A massive world tour included China in April 1985, which generated a great deal of media coverage as it was the first visit to China by a Western popular music act.

== Session work ==
Eyre, who had done studio work for many artists before, started working predominantly as a session musician from the late 1980s. His studio work included recordings with Ian Gillan, BBM, and several recordings with Gary Moore in 1982 and throughout the nineties. Another musician for whom Eyre contributed session work was Gerry Rafferty. Rafferty's 1978 album City to City included the hit "Baker Street" on which Eyre played synthesizer and keyboards. The track "Whatever's Written in Your Heart" was recorded with Eyre playing piano and Rafferty singing beside him.

During the 1990s, Eyre recorded several albums with his wife the American violinist Scarlet Rivera, many of them influenced by traditional Irish or Scottish music. Later in the nineties he also produced some solo albums with instrumental piano music. Tommy played keyboard on the Alex Harvey recording of The Poet and I Written by Frank Mills and Ray Conn.

== Private life ==
Eyre lived most of his life in England up until the mid-1980s with his first wife Lorraine Eyre. They divorced in 1988 but remained close until his death. From the late 1980s, he lived in the US with his American wife, the violinist Scarlet Rivera. He died of esophageal cancer in Los Angeles on 23 May 2001, aged 51.

Eyre's younger brother is session guitarist Simon Eyre, who has worked with artists such as Paul Weller, the Lighthouse Family, Robert Palmer, Sister Sledge and Randy Crawford.

== Discography ==
=== Solo albums ===
- Moonlight Piano, Vol. 1 (1998)
- Moonlight Piano, Vol. 2 (1998)
- Moonlight Piano, Vol. 3 (1998)
- Ivory Christmas – Piano Classics (1995)
- A Highland Christmas (1997)
- Have Yourself a Jazzy Little Christmas (1999)
- Celestial Harp: Christmas Themes (1997)

=== Albums with Scarlet Rivera ===
- Magical Christmas (1997)
- Behind the Crimson Veil (1998)
- Celtic Myst (1998)
- Celtic Dreams (1998)
- Celtic Spirit (1997)
- Voice of the Animals (2001)
- Contemporary Piano & Cello Christmas Classics (1999)
- Baroque at Christmas (2001)

=== Album appearances ===
- Joe Cocker & the Grease Band – With a Little Help from My Friends (1969)
- Aynsley Dunbar Retaliation – To Mum from Aynsley and the Boys (1969)
- Blue Whale – Blue Whale (1970)
- Jaklin – Jaklin (1969)
- Mark-Almond – Mark-Almond (1971)
- Mark-Almond – Mark-Almond II (1972)
- Riff Raff – Riff Raff (1973)
- Riff Raff – Original Man (1974)
- ZZebra – Zzebra (1974)
- ZZebra – Panic (1975)
- Strawbs – Nomadness (1975) – piano, clavinet, synthesizer
- Mark-Almond – To the Heart (1976)
- Gerry Rafferty – City to City (1978)
- The Sensational Alex Harvey Band – Rock Drill (1978)
- Gerry Rafferty – Night Owl (1979)
- Alex Harvey – The Mafia Stole My Guitar (1979)
- John Martyn – Grace and Danger (1980)
- Greg Lake – Greg Lake (1981)
- Greg Lake – Manoeuvres (1983)
- Greg Lake – King Biscuit Flower Hour Presents Greg Lake in Concert (1995) – (recorded 5 November 1981 live in concert at the Hammersmith Odeon, London)
- Gary Moore – Corridors of Power (1982)
- Michael Schenker Group – Assault Attack (1982)
- Wham! – Fantastic (1983)
- Wham! – Make It Big (1984)
- Wham! – Music from the Edge of Heaven (1985)
- Ray Russell – A Table Nearer the Band (1990)
- Ian Gillan – Naked Thunder (1990)
- Gary Moore – After Hours (1992)
- Gary Moore – Blues for Greeny (1995)
- Gary Moore – Blues Alive (1993)
- BBM – Around the Next Dream (1994)
- Keb' Mo' – Keb' Mo' (1994)
- Bill Tarmey – Time for Love (1994)
- Jake Andrews – Time to Burn (1999)
- Jake Andrews – Jake Andrews (2002)
- Ritual (Uruguay) – A New Map of the World (2000)
