= Gwyn Ashton =

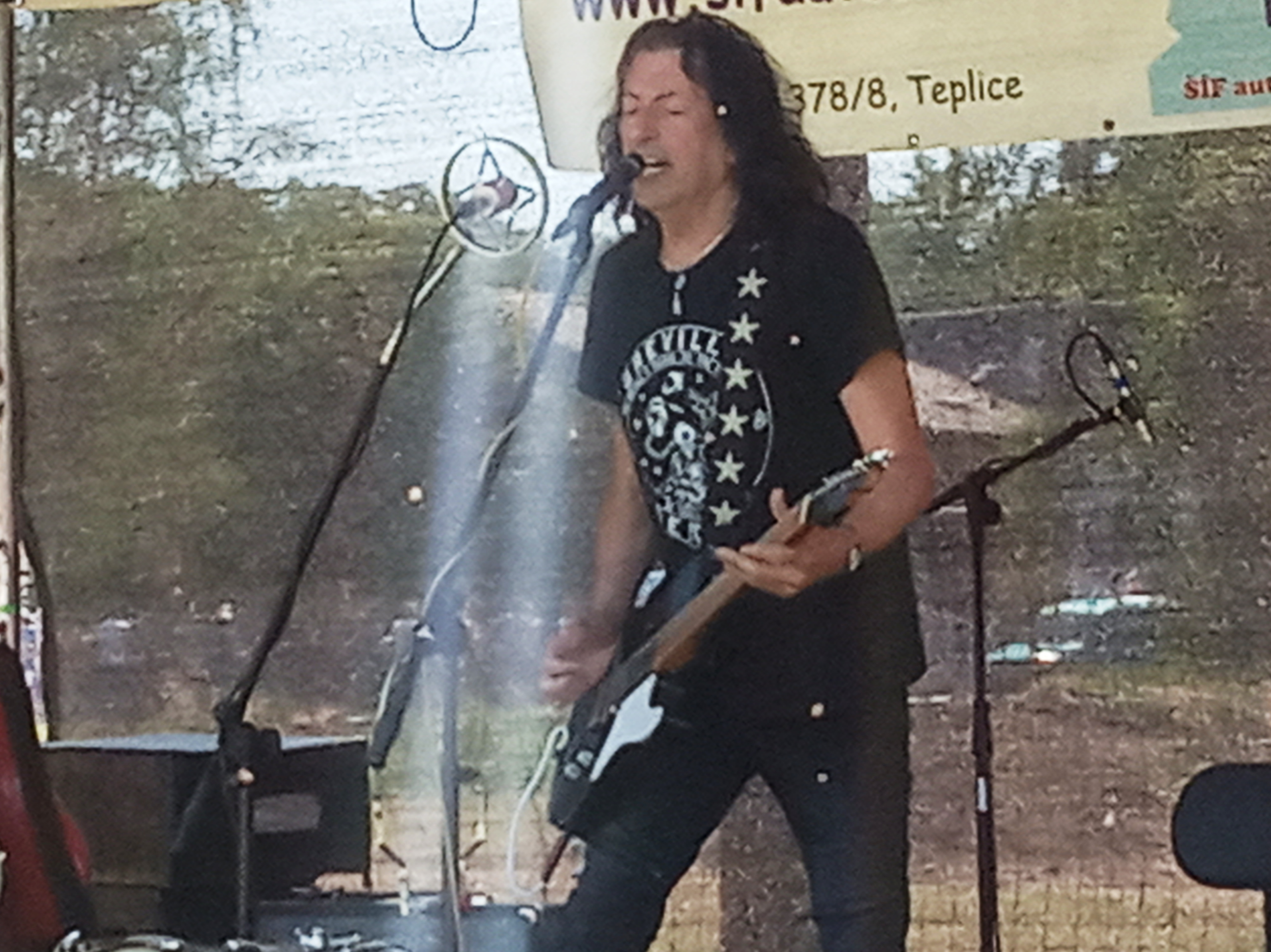
- Ashton in Rtyně nad Bílinou, 2019

Background information
- Born: 1960 (age 65–66); Wales
- Origin: Adelaide, South Australia, Australia
- Genres: Blues rock, blues, boogie rock
- Occupations: Singer-songwriter, musician, producer
- Instruments: Guitars (electric, slide, acoustic), harmonica, mandolin
- Years active: 1985–present
- Labels: Upbeat, Riverside
- Website: gwynashton.com

Gwyn Ashton (born 1960, Wales) is a Welsh–Australian blues, rock guitarist and singer-songwriter. He has released ten albums and toured Australia, Europe and North America.

== Biography ==
The Welsh-born Gwyn Ashton migrated to Adelaide, South Australia, with his family, in the mid-1960s. He began playing guitar at the age of 12 and was performing in bars at 16 as well as attending festivals across Australia. Ashton moved to Sydney in 1983 where he was lead guitarist and backing vocalist for Swanee in 1985 and Stevie Wright in 1986. While in Sydney he formed his own trio, which performed locally. He then returned to Adelaide in 1990 where he was joined by Laurie Height on bass guitar and Rick Tredrea on drums.

In 1991 he moved to Melbourne and played on Jim Keays' solo album. Ashton supported tours by Rory Gallagher, Junior Wells, Steve Morse and Albert Lee. Encouraged by Billy Thorpe to jam with Mick Fleetwood, Ashton was suggested to replace Rick Vito in Fleetwood Mac, which did not eventuate as they reformed with the Buckingham-Nicks line-up. Ashton issued his debut solo album, Feel the Heat, in 1993 via Upbeat Records. Gwyn Ashton Band members were Ashton on lead vocals, guitars, mandolin and harmonica, Tredrea on drums, percussion and backing vocals and Geoff Brown on bass guitar. It was co-produced by Adam Quaife and the band at Fortissimo Studios, Melbourne with Quaife also on Hammond organ and Colin Mack on harmonica.

Ashton second album, Beg, Borrow and Steel, followed in 1996, where he was joined in the studio by Chris Farmer on double bass, Ken Farmer on drums, Anthony Harkin on harmonica and Mick O'Connor on piano and Hammond organ. It was co-produced by Ashton with Andy Parsons. Ashton relocated to England in 1996 and played the European festival circuit for three years. The artist released his third solo album, Fang it! (2000), via England's Riverside Records. It was recorded at Matrix Studios, London with Ashton joined by producer Dennis Greaves on vibraphone and backing vocals, Brendan O'Neill on drums and Gerry McAvoy on bass guitar and backing vocals. Zee Yimou of hEARd magazine felt that the "sounds here will be familiar to fans of blues & guitar artists like Stevie Ray Vaughan, but there's no copycat syndrome here, rather [Ashton's] music takes a rather different tack on what you might think to listen to [Vaughan's] music". zipworld' Mark Watson praised his "superb writing talent in addition to his talent as a master guitarist".

By 2001 Ashton had joined Virgin Records France and was listed at third position as Guitarist of the Year by Guitar Part magazine. First and second positions were Jeff Beck and Gary Moore, respectively. Ashton's first gig in France was opening for Buddy Guy ahead of ex Rolling Stones' Mick Taylor. Ashton questioned this and said 'we don't deserve to be on after Mick. It's the wrong way around' but the organisers insisted on this as his popularity in France had grown. Ashton then played the Paris Music Trade Show where Fender France presented him with a new Stratocaster. With numerous worldwide radio appearances under his belt, in the '90s Ashton appeared live on a radio show in Kent, England with Bert Jansch. He played on a derelict Dutch train carriage on the pirate station Radio London in the Netherlands and networks in Australia including various ABC stations and public radio. He was also interviewed and played a live performance in France on Paris Inter.

Ashton then co-headlined Garden Blues Festival in Marseille with Robben Ford and on the bill with Ray Charles at Cognac Blues Passions. At this time Ashton had two of his albums simultaneously in the Amazon France Top 100 charts. He has played many guitar and blues festivals including two appearances at the Acoustic Festival of Great Britain, Popkomm in Berlin, Guitar Heroes Festival in Germany with Mick Taylor and has conducted blues masterclasses at London's Guitar Institute, Guitar X and Academy of Sound in Birmingham and Exeter, England. Ashton also played the 10th annual ’Thanks Jimi’ Festival in Wroclaw, Poland onstage with Bernie Marsden and Jimi Hendrix's brother Leon Hendrix, leading 8000 guitarists playing ‘Hey Joe’ in the market square setting a new ‘Guinness Book of World Records’.

For five years Ashton was Gerry McAvoy's choice for fronting the Rory Gallagher celebratory group Band of Friends, replacing Thin Lizzy, Motorhead guitarist Brian Robertson. They headlined the first two Ballyshannon Rory Gallagher Festivals with members of The Dubliners opening for them. Rory's brother Donal was taken aback by Ashton's interpretation of his late brother's guitar playing stating ‘I like the way you put your own slant on Rory's music, you don't just copy him’. The band consisted of Gerry, Lou Martin, Brendan O’Neill, Mark Feltham and Dennis Greaves, all who at the time played in the band Nine Below Zero. Gerry and Brendan played on Ashton's ‘Fang It! album with Greaves producing it. The album received great reviews and won many awards for ‘Album of The Year’ in a host of magazines.

Italian guitar company Liutart then asked Ashton to design his own signature guitar which he uses to this day with the configuration based on his favourite classic guitars – Gibson Firebird, Danelectro and Fender Telecaster pickups. Ashton called this 'the ultimate slide guitar'.

Since then Ashton has been touring Europe with many acts including The Yardbirds, Johnny Winter, Peter Green, Slade, The Sweet, Canned Heat, Magnum, The Troggs and headlining his own shows. He has also played dates in England with Van Morrison, Robin Trower, Jeff Healey, Tony Joe White, Walter Trout and 15 arena shows, including Wembley, with the legendary Status Quo with Francis Rossi asking him about co-writing and Rick Parfitt wanting some slide guitar tips. Ashton has shared the bill twice with Joe Bonamassa, once at Birmingham NEC for Music Live and once at a guitar festival in Sweden. Ashton has performed at guitar shows appeared twice on Czech National TV, ZDF TV in Germany and in Bulgaria on Slavi's Show, Slavi being the 'Bulgarian Jay Leno' with an audience of two million. This coincided with Ashton's concert for the American Chamber of Commerce celebrating American Independence Day, 50 years of Bulgarian occupancy and the 50th anniversary of the Stratocaster, the show being organised by Fender Bulgaria 4 July 2004.

Ashton's fourth solo album, Prohibition, was released in March 2006 via Dixiefrog Records with Ashton, Chris Glen and Ted McKenna co-producing. AllMusic's Stewart Mason rated it at three-out-of-five stars and explained, "[he] is a very gifted stylist with a good line in mimicry but little in the way of personal expression. Die-hard blues-rock aficionados will likely appreciate Prohibition, but some might find it slightly disappointing." Three years running he played at Deep Purple keyboardist Don Airey's charity show near Cambridge, England with members of Whitesnake Bernie Marsden, Mickey Moody and Neil Murray, plus Uli John Roth, Robert Hart and Jimmy Page's first choice for Led Zeppelin vocalist Terry Reid. Airey has played on two of Ashton's albums ‘'Prohibition'’ (alongside Chris Glen and Ted McKenna from Sensational Alex Harvey Band, Ian Gillan, Michael Schenker Group) and ‘Radiogram’ which also features guest appearances from Kim Wilson (Fabulous Thunderbirds), Robbie Blunt (Robert Plant), Mark Stanway (Magnum, Phil Lynott's Grand Slam) and Mo Birch (Robert Plant, Go West, Paul Rodgers, Culture Club). Ashton has recorded eight albums, some with special guests mentioned above. As of 2009 he was residing in Bewdley.

Ashton has been invited onstage with some of the greatest blues and rock musicians, including ex-Black Crowes Marc Ford, who also asked him to play lap steel on a studio session in Los Angeles. They also played three duo shows together. He jammed with Walter Trout, the legendary Canned Heat and Hubert Sumlin at blues festivals in England and Germany, bassist extraordinaire Jerry Jermott (BB King, Aretha Franklin) and Cactus and former Vanilla Fudge bassist Tim Bogert in Los Angeles and he even sat around David Crosby's dining room table trading licks on acoustic guitar with the former Byrd's legendary singer, songwriter. Jackson Browne and Robert Plant have both commented favourably on Ashton's playing and both been part of his audience. Ashton has even been known to sit around former Rainbow and Alcatraz singer Graham Bonnet in his living room, playing and singing Beatles songs together! He's also played with Steely Dan's Elliott Randal and former Jethro Tull's Mick Abrahams at a fund-raising show in England. Tull's former drummer Clive Bunker was Ashton's first UK drummer, and Ashton played two shows with ex-Rick Wakeman singer Gary Pickford-Hopkins.

During a tour of Spain, Ashton found himself jamming with former Wings drummer Geoff Britten who played on ‘Venus and Mars’. In Austin Texas, he was invited onstage with the hierarchy of the Austin scene including Derek O’Brien, Malford Milligan, Chris Duarte, Roscoe Beck and Frosty.

Eric Johnson's bassist Chris Maresh joined Ashton on a 2018 German tour with Welsh drummer Chris Sharley from the 70s band Sassafrass. Budgie's Burke Shelley gave Ashton a CD to learn their songs as they were possibly looking for a replacement guitarist at one stage. Shelley's blues band opened for Ashton at a Christmas party at Tawe Delta Blues Club in Swansea, Wales. They were introduced by Dire Straits and Rockpile drummer Terry Williams.

Ashton's first Czech Republic gig was with BB King at Golem Blues Festival where he was the only other musician, apart from King's band, allowed in the dressing room prior to King's performance.

Forever pushing the boundaries of his abilities, Gwyn Ashton's critically acclaimed latest release ‘Solo Elektro’ sees him reinvented as an alternative progressive blues-rock solo artist with elements of 1960s garage rock, psychedelia, acoustic roots, dance and chill-out music and some good old-fashioned rock 'n' roll. The album has garnished great reviews from lifestyle magazine Paris Move, Classic Rock Magazine, Powerplay Rock and Metal Magazine, RnR and Australia's Rhythms Magazine who stated ‘Throw Pink Floyd, The Beatles circa ’66 and Rory Gallagher into one big fuzz-filled concoction and there lays Gwyn Ashton's one-man band’.

His 2019 album Sonic Blues Preachers was recorded with John Freeman from the 1970s band Fraternity which also included the frontman Bon Scott, pre-AC/DC. In 2022 Ashton released his solo album "Mojosoul" to celebrate 50 years of playing guitar. He plays all of the instruments on the album including guitars, harmonica and foot drums.

== Awards ==
In 2001 French magazine Guitar Part, listed Gwyn Ashton at third position of guitarist of the year, with Jeff Beck and Gary Moore and first and second position. In 2007 his album Prohibition was voted Album of the Year by the British Guitar and Bass magazine.

== Discography ==
- Feel the Heat (1993) – Upbeat Records (GACD6969)
- Beg, Borrow & Steel (March 1996) – Upbeat Records
- Fang it ! (2000) – Riverside Records
- Prohibition (2006) – Dixiefrog (8603)
- Two-Man Blues Army (2009) –
- Radiogram (2012) –
- Ragas, Jugs & Mojo Hands (Australia-only 2016) –
- Solo Elektro (2017) –
- Sonic Blues Preachers (2019) –
- Mojosoul (2022) –
- Grease Bucket (2025)
