= Alex Harvey and His Soul Band =

Studio album by Alex Harvey
- Released: 1964
- Recorded: October 1963
- Genre: Rock and roll; rhythm and blues; soul
- Length: 32:21
- Label: Polydor

Alex Harvey chronology
Alex Harvey and His Soul Band (1964)	The Blues (1964)

Singles from Alex Harvey and His Soul Band
- 1. "I Just Wanna Make Love to You" Released: February 1964 (UK); 2. "I Ain't Worrying Baby" Released: May 1964 (UK); 3. "New Orleans" Released: July 1964 (US)

Professional ratings
Review scores
Source	Rating
Allmusic	3/5 stars
Record Mirror	5/5 stars

Alex Harvey and His Soul Band is the debut album by Alex Harvey accompanied by his Soul Band. It was originally released in 1964 on vinyl, and was re-released on vinyl in Germany in 1985 or 1986. The 1999 release is a compilation of 20 unreleased songs of the Soul Band, including two songs recorded before the debut album. The album is available on CD.

Apparently the backing group on this recording – made at a Hamburg club, or simulated to sound like a show – does not feature the actual Soul Band, but musicians from the obscure Liverpool group Kingsize Taylor and the Dominoes.

== Track listing ==
=== Side one ===
1. "Framed" (Jerry Leiber, Mike Stoller) – 3:21
2. "I Ain't Worrying Baby" (Alex Harvey) – 2:58
3. "Backwater Blues" (Lonnie Johnson) – 3:07
4. "Let the Good Times Roll (Leonard Lee) – 3:05
5. "Going Home" (Alex Harvey) – 2:09
6. "I've Got My Mojo Working" (McKinley Morganfield) – 3:50
7. "Teens Ville USA" (Cogswall) – 3:33

=== Side two ===
1. "New Orleans" (Traditional) – 3:19
2. "Bo Diddley is a Gunslinger" (Bo Diddley) – 2:26
3. "When I Grow Too Old to Rock" (Sigmund Romberg, Oscar Hammerstein II) – 2:26
4. "Evil Hearted Man" (Josh White) – 3:00
5. "I Just Wanna Make Love to You" (Willie Dixon) – 2:38
6. "The Blind Man" (Traditional) – 2:35
7. "Reelin' and Rockin'" (Chuck Berry) (re-released album only) – 3:29

== Track listing for 1999 German release ==
1. "The Liverpool Scene"
2. "Shout" (O'Kelly Isley, Ronald Isley, Rudolph Isley)
3. "What's Wrong With Me Baby?"
4. "Reelin' and Rockin" (Chuck Berry)
5. "The Canoe Song"
6. "The Little Boy that Santa Claus Forgot"
7. "Hoochie Coochie Man" (Willie Dixon)
8. "Long Long Gone"
9. "My Kind of Lovin'"
10. "Outskirts of Town"
11. "Parchman Farm"
12. "Penicillin Blues"
13. "Shakin' All Over" (Johnny Kidd)
14. "Sticks and Stones"
15. "Take Out Some Insurance On Me, Baby"
16. "Ten A Penny"
17. "Tutti Frutti"
18. "You Ain't No Good To Me"
19. "You Are My Sunshine" (Jimmie Davis, Charles Mitchell)
20. "You've Put A Spell On Me"
