= The Sensational Alex Harvey Band =

Scottish rock band

- Also known as: SAHB
- Origin: Glasgow, Scotland
- Genres: Glam rock; hard rock
- Years active: 1972–1978
- Labels: Vertigo; Universal International; Atlantic (North America)
- Past members: Alex Harvey; Zal Cleminson; Chris Glen; Hugh McKenna; Ted McKenna; Tommy Eyre; Julian Hutson-Saxby; Stevie Doherty; Billy Rankin; Max Maxwell; Phil Mount (drummer 1978)

The Sensational Alex Harvey Band were a Scottish rock band formed in Glasgow in 1972. Fronted by Alex Harvey accompanied by Zal Cleminson on guitar, bassist Chris Glen, keyboard player Hugh McKenna and drummer Ted McKenna, their music was a blend of blues rock and hard rock, with cabaret elements. Their stage performances incorporated theatrical elements. The band were popular in continental Europe, and influential in Australia, most notably to AC/DC (particularly their singer Bon Scott) and to the young Nick Cave and his first band the Boys Next Door.

== History ==
=== Original run ===
In August 1972, Alex Harvey formed the Sensational Alex Harvey Band (often shortened to SAHB, and pronounced "saab") with Zal Cleminson (guitar), Chris Glen (bass), and cousins Hugh (keyboards) and Ted McKenna (drums), all members of the progressive rock act Tear Gas except Hugh.

They adopted distinctive stage costumes: Harvey wore vaudeville-like clothes and his trademark hooped shirt, while Cleminson assumed the identity of a harlequin in full make-up and green-yellow jumpsuit and Glen wore a dark blue jumpsuit reminiscent of a superhero costume incorporating a lighter blue codpiece. SAHB produced a succession of highly regarded albums and tours throughout the 1970s. The band did not enjoy large-scale success in the United States as it had in the UK, though they did acquire a cult following in certain US cities, notably Cleveland, where the group first played at the Agora Ballroom in December 1974. Thanks to airplay from Cleveland radio station WMMS, songs like "Next" and "The Faith Healer" became popular.

In January 1974, the band went into Advision Studios in London with the American producer Shel Talmy to record a third album. By April, the sessions were finished and the album was mixed. However, the band and management had some reservations about the overall sound and decided to scrap the entire album. Talmy returned to Los Angeles with his tapes. Most of the song titles appeared on the official album The Impossible Dream later that year with a different producer, though the songs were dramatically changed. The original recordings formed an album called Hot City, released in 2009 by Major League Productions.

The Sensational Alex Harvey Band had top 40 hits in Britain with the single "Delilah", a cover version of the Tom Jones hit from their Live album that reached number seven in 1975, and with "The Boston Tea Party" in June 1976. The song "Anthem" was a top 30 hit in Australia in 1975.

Harvey left the group late in 1976; the other members continued with the name "SAHB (without Alex)". They recorded a new album, Fourplay, in February 1977. The album steered towards a solid pop-rock with some slight prog influences. Harvey re-joined the group in mid-1977, while Hugh McKenna left. In 1978, the Sensational Alex Harvey Band recorded Rock Drill, with Tommy Eyre replacing Hugh McKenna, and disbanded shortly afterwards. Harvey died of heart failure on 4 February 1982 in Belgium.

=== Reunions ===
In 1992, Glen, Cleminson and Ted McKenna banded together to form "The Party Boys" which featured guest vocalists such as Fish, Dan McCafferty and Stevie Doherty with the Stone The Crows keyboard player Ronnie Leahy. This band lasted about one year before deciding to recruit keyboard player Hugh McKenna and finally reform as SAHB. A live album, Live in Glasgow 1993, was released, with Doherty on vocals. This line-up of SAHB disbanded in 1995, before reforming in 2002 for a tribute night to Frankie Miller at The Barrowlands in Glasgow, with the ex-Nazareth guitarist Billy Rankin on vocals. After a year, "Mad" Max Maxwell replaced Rankin.

Keyboardist Tommy Eyre died in 2001.

SAHB released another live album in 2006, Zalvation, which was their first official release since Rock Drill in 1978, and an autobiography called SAHB Story, written by the former tour manager and author Martin Keilty. The band performed numerous tours and festivals across the UK, Europe and Australia before disbanding again in 2008, after the departure of Cleminson on guitar. The band performed a handful of shows that were pre-booked with the guitarist Julian Hutson Saxby but after that, they decided to move on to separate projects.

Both McKenna cousins, Ted and Hugh, died in 2019. Ted died on 19 January 2019, and Hugh died on 18 December 2019.

Max Maxwell (born 29 April 1958) died on 17 December 2023.

== Legacy ==
In 2018, Nick Cave told Primal Scream's Bobby Gillespie, "My first band was basically an Alex Harvey cover band. We did "Framed", "Isobel Goudie", "Faith Healer", "Gang Bang", "Next", "Midnight Moses", everything. I wore jeans and a tight cropped t-shirt and our guitarist wore clown make-up like Zal... Our first gig was a Battle of the Bands thing in a country town and we played "Framed" and came second. It's been downhill ever since."

Earlier, while the Sensational Alex Harvey Band was still active, Bob Seger included "Gang Bang" in his set, as documented on his July 8, 1974 show at Ebbets Field in Denver. Seger jokingly introduces it as a love song "ballad".

Robert Smith of the Cure said, "People talk about Iggy Pop as the original punk, but certainly in Britain the forerunner of the punk movement was Alex Harvey. His whole stage show with the graffiti-covered brick walls – it was like very aggressive Glaswegian street theatre."

== Members ==
Classic lineup

- Alex Harvey – vocals (1972–late 1976, mid-1977–1978) (died 1982)
- Zal Cleminson – guitar (1972–1978, 1993–1995, 2002–2008)
- Chris Glen – bass (1972–1978, 1993–1995, 2002–2008)
- Hugh McKenna – keyboards (1972–1977, 1993–1995, 2002–2008) (died 2019)
- Ted McKenna – drums (1972–1978, 1993–1995, 2002–2008) (died 2019)

Later members

- Tommy Eyre – keyboards (1977–1978) (died 2001)
- Stevie Doherty – vocals (1993–1995)
- Billy Rankin – vocals (2002–2003)
- Max Maxwell – vocals (2003–2008) (died 2023)
- Julian Hutson-Saxby – guitar (2008)

== Discography ==
=== Studio albums ===
Release date	Album details	Peak chart position			Certifications (sales thresholds)
Release date	Album details	UK	AUS	SWE	Certifications (sales thresholds)
December 1972	Framed	—	—	—	
November 16, 1973	Next...	37	—	—	UK: Silver
October 4, 1974	The Impossible Dream	16	78	—	UK: Silver
April 1975	Tomorrow Belongs to Me	9	—	—	UK: Silver
March 1976	The Penthouse Tapes	14	—	35	UK: Silver
July 1976	SAHB Stories	11	98	33	UK: Silver
February 1977	Fourplay	—	—	—	
March 1978	Rock Drill	—	—	—	

=== Live albums ===
Release date	Album details	Peak chart position		Certifications (sales thresholds)
Release date	Album details	UK	US	Certifications (sales thresholds)
September 1975	Live	14	100	UK: Silver
1977	Alex Harvey Presents: The Loch Ness Monster	—	—	
1991	BBC Radio 1 Live in Concert	—	—	
1995	Live on the Test	—	—	
1998	The Gospel According to Alex Harvey	—	—	
2004	British Tour '76	—	—	
2006	US Tour '74	—	—	
2009	Live at the BBC (Spectrum/Universal 2009)	—	—	
2026	Good Evening Boys And Girls (Madfish 21CD live box 2026) Marquee Club, London (18 September 1973) / Rainbow Theatre, London (7 June 1974) / Mayfair Ballroom, Newcastle (18 October 1974) / Syracuse, NY (Autumn 1974) / Electric Ladyland Studios, New York City (16 November 1974) / New Jersey (1974) / Mayfair Ballroom, Newcastle (9 May 1975) / Guildhall, Preston (11 May 1975) / Free Trade Hall, Manchester (12 May 1975) / City Hall, Sheffield (13 May 1975) / Victoria Ground, Stoke-on-Trent (17 May 1975) Apollo, Glasgow (20 December 1975) / New Victoria Theatre, London (23 December 1975) / Free Trade Hall, Manchester (9 May 1976) / Neue Welt, Berlin (12 October 1976) / Reading Festival (28 August 1977)	—	—	

=== Reunion albums ===
- Live in Glasgow 1993 (1994) (with Stevie Doherty on vocals)
- Zalvation a.k.a. Zalvation: Live in the 21st Century (2006) (with "Mad" Max Maxwell on vocals)

=== Compilations/other releases ===
- Hot City (early version of The Impossible Dream, remastered and released in 2009)
- Vambo Rools: 'Big Hits and Close Shaves' (Vertigo 1977)
- The Sensational Alex Harvey Band Collection (Castle Communications 1986)
- All Sensations (Vertigo 1992)
- Faith Healer – An Introduction to (Mercury Records 2001)
- ...Delilah (Spectrum 1998)
- Considering the Situation (Universal 2003)
- The Best of the Sensational Alex Harvey - #148 UK
- Last of the Teenage Idols (2016) – a 14-CD/217-track box set including 21 previously unreleased songs, 59 songs on CD for the first time and a number of rare recordings plus a hardback book of photographs.
- Shout: The Essential Alex Harvey (Spectrum Audio 2018)
- Good Evening Boys And Girls - a 21-CD limited edition live box set, (Madfish, 2026)

=== Singles ===
Year	Title	UK	AU	BE
1972	"There's No Lights on the Christmas Tree..."	-	-	-
1973	"Jungle Jenny"	-	-	-
1973	"Next..."	-	-	-
1974	"Anthem"	-	47	-
1974	"Sergeant Fury"	-	-	
1975	"Delilah"	7	-	49
1975	"Gamblin' Bar Room Blues"	38	-	-
1976	"Boston Tea Party"	13	-	-
1976	"Amos Moses"	-	-	-
1977	"Mrs. Blackhouse"	-	-	-
