= Chris Glen =

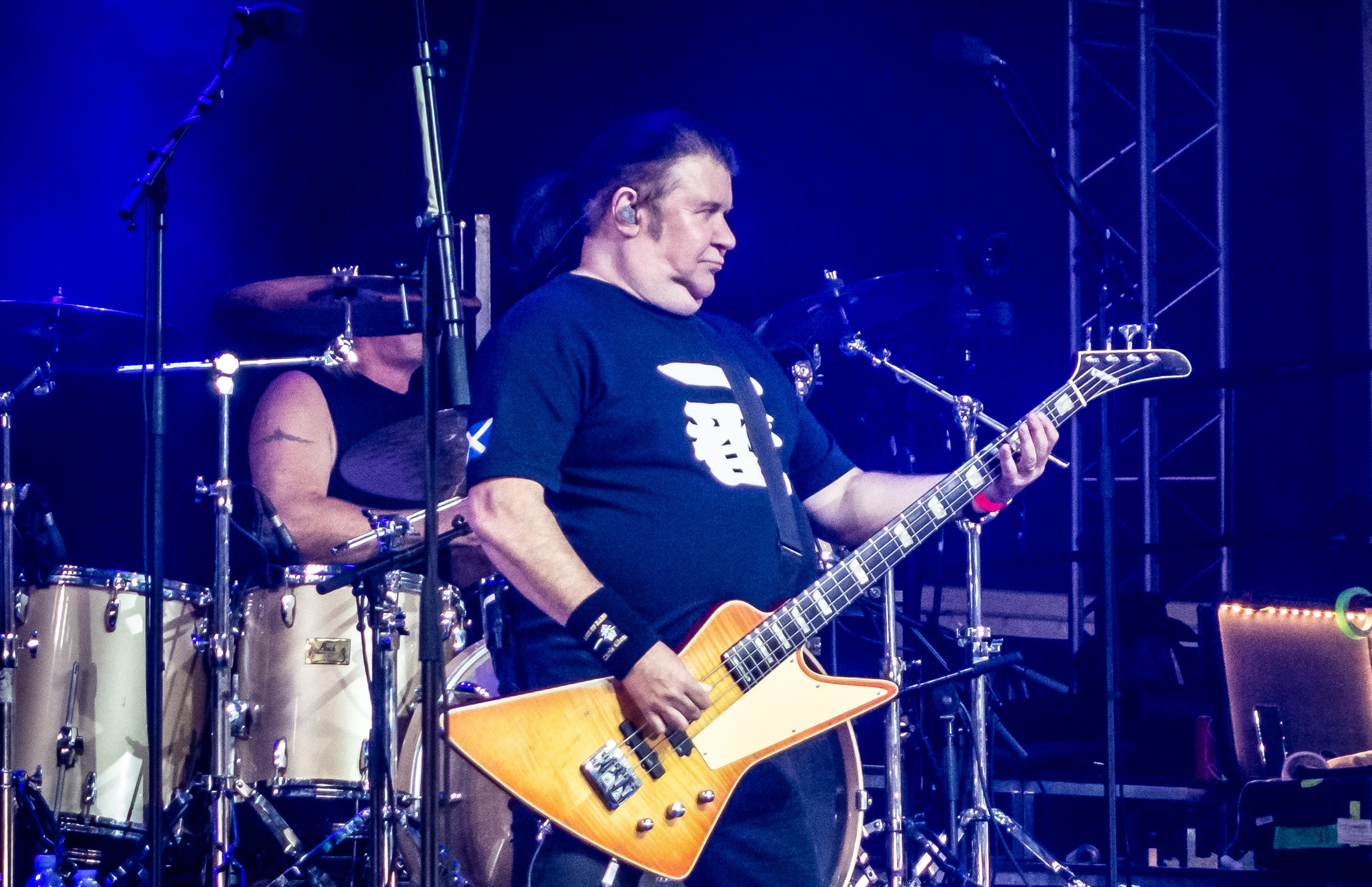
- Glen performing with Michael Schenker Fest in 2019

Background information
- Born: Christopher John Glen; November 6, 1950 (age 75); Paisley, Renfrewshire, Scotland
- Origin: Glasgow, Scotland
- Genres: Rock
- Occupation: Bassist
- Years active: 1969–present
- Labels: Vertigo; Polygram
- Website: http://www.chrisglen.co.uk/

Christopher John Glen (born 6 November 1950), known simply as Chris Glen, is a Scottish rock musician. He is best known for playing with The Sensational Alex Harvey Band from 1972 to 1977, and The Michael Schenker Group from 1980 to 1984, 2008 to 2010, and 2016 to 2020. He also performed with Michael Schenker Fest, featuring original MSG band members.

== Early career and the Sensational Alex Harvey Band ==
Glen began his career as bassist for a band known as The Jade in 1969. That band changed their name to Mustard, which eventually was composed of Eddie Campbell (keyboards), Zal Cleminson (guitar), Glen (bass, vocals), Gilson Lavis (drums) and Andi Mulvey (vocals). After changing their name to Tear Gas, Mulvey was replaced by David Batchelor, and Lavis was replaced by Richard Munro. This lineup recorded their first album Piggy Go Getter in 1970. Eventually another personnel change saw Campbell leave and Ted McKenna and his cousin Hugh McKenna take over for Munro and Batchelor (who went on to produce several SAHB albums). They recorded a second album Tear Gas in 1971.

In 1972, fellow Scotsman Alex Harvey joined forces with Tear Gas and together they formed the Sensational Alex Harvey Band. They played with the lineup of Harvey, Cleminson, Glen and the McKennas until a personnel change in 1976 which saw Hugh McKenna replaced by Tommy Eyre. Harvey who had left briefly in 1976, left the band for good in 1977. The band disbanded just before the release of the album Rock Drill. The band were due to start a European Tour which started in Stockholm, Sweden but Alex left the rehearsal studio early as he had seen a Purple Light which means you cannot cross water. Alex was very superstitious and told the band he could not cross water to start the tour and eventually left the band. The surviving members of SAHB formed several times between 1993 and 2008 with various vocalists.

== John Martyn ==
Glen had a brief spell with guitarist John Martyn where he performed at Glastonbury in 1979. Glen was also part of Martyn's album Grace and Danger.

== Michael Schenker Group (1980–1984) ==
After his record deal with Mountain Management expired, Glen was now a free agent to perform with other acts properly and it was around 1980 he was introduced to German rock guitarist Michael Schenker who shot to fame in Scorpions and UFO respectively. Glen performed on the albums Michael Schenker Group, Assault Attack, Built to Destroy and two live albums: Live at the Budokan with Cozy Powell on drums, and then a few years later Rock Will Never Die with Ted McKenna on drums. Glen left MSG in 1984 due to Schenker's erratic behaviour with drink and drugs.

== GMT (Glen/Macaulay/Taylor) (1985) ==
Shortly after leaving MSG, Glen formed his first band GMT which consisted of Vocalist Robin McAuley, ex Motorhead drummer Phil 'Philthy' Taylor, and Thin Lizzy guitarist Brian Robertson. The group released a 4 track EP called Wargames but disbanded shortly after that. Glen had done session work for TV and Radio, as well as working as a bus driver in London.

== Ian Gillan's band (1990) ==
In 1990, Glen was approached by Deep Purple vocalist Ian Gillan to be part of the rhythm section of his solo band which would see him pair up once again with SAHB/MSG drummer Ted McKenna and they embarked on a world tour to promote Ian's solo album Naked Thunder. This tour also released a live DVD which was filmed in Nottingham, England.

== Reunions with the Sensational Alex Harvey Band (1992–2008) ==
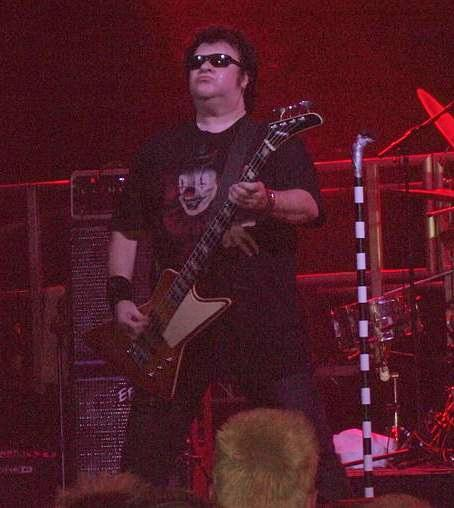
Glen performing with SAHB in 2007.

In 1991, Ted McKenna formed The Party Boys which was a super group of musicians with guest vocalists which featured the likes Alan Thomson on Bass, Zal Cleminson on Guitar, Ronnie Leahy on Keyboards, and vocalists such as Stevie Doherty, Fish, and Dan McCafferty. This then changed when Ronnie and Alan were unable to do a handful of shows so Ted brought in Glen on bass and SAHB keyboardist Hugh McKenna.

This band lasted about 2 years before they decided to reform as SAHB (Without Alex). They stuck with vocalist Stevie Doherty and had relative success in the UK and Europe and also released a live album called Live in Glasgow 93.

This line-up of SAHB disbanded in 1995, before reforming in 2002 for a tribute night to Frankie Miller at The Barrowlands in Glasgow with ex Nazareth guitarist Billy Rankin on vocals. After a year 'Mad' Max Maxwell replaced Rankin on vocals.

SAHB released a live album titled Zalvation, which was their first official release since Rock Drill with Alex Harvey in 1977, and an autobiography called SAHBSTORY, written by former tour manager and author Martin Keilty. The band performed numerous tours and festivals across the UK, Europe, and Australia before once again disbanding in 2008 after the departure of Zal Cleminson on guitar. The band carried out a handful of shows that were pre-booked with guitarist Julian Hutson Saxby but after that, they decided to move on to separate projects.

== Chris Glen & The Outfit (2008–2020) ==
In 2008, Glen has formed his own band Chris Glen and the Outfit which featured ex Rainbow vocalist Doogie White, SAHB Frontman Max Maxwell, ex Marianne Faithful guitarist Brian McFie and ex Texas drummer Ross McFarlane.

The Outfit members changed a lot over the years and some of the musicians included: Davie Halley - Drums John McClelland - Drums Julian Hutson Saxby - Guitar Dave Cuthbert - Guitar Jon Morrison - Guitar Peter Higgins - Vocals Peter Scallan - Vocals Leon Gowrie - Vocals Stuart Clyde - Keyboards David Cowan Keyboards Sean McQueen - Keyboards and more..

This project consisted of material that Glen had been playing throughout his career from SAHB, Michael Schenker and Ian Gillan. No original material was ever written or performed during this venture.

== Michael Schenker Group (2008–2011) ==
Glen re-joined the Michael Schenker Group (MSG) to 2010 to promote the album In the Midst of Beauty. That was Glen's first tour with MSG since he left in 1984 shortly after recording the Built to Destroy album. He has also performed on two tracks on Michael Schenker's 2011 album Temple of Rock. During this time Glen performed several tours in the UK, Japan and selected dates in Europe. They played some notable festivals such as Hard Rock Hell. Glen would be invited into the lineup periodically thereafter.

== Gwyn Ashton / Paul Rose ==
Glen and Ted McKenna worked with Australian guitarist Gwyn Ashton, on an album called Prohibition in 2004 and performed shows to promote it. This was a brief project that both Glen and McKenna were involved in. Later in 2004, McKenna was working with Paul Rose and asked Glen to come in for some shows with the band but shortly left and was replaced by Alan Thomson. McKenna continued to work with Rose on and off until his passing in 2019.

== Cafe Jacques ==
He is a member of the reformed 1970s band Cafe Jacques with drummer Davie Halley, keyboardist Stuart Clyde, and original vocalist/guitarist Chris Thomson. The band released a 3-track EP called Lifer before disbanding following the death of drummer Davie Halley.

== Votadini ==
Glen was part of the 3-piece project composed mainly of rock standards with a twist. The band consisted of Chris Thomson on guitar and vocals, and Johnny 'Bohran' Watson.

== Chris Slade Timeline / Steel Circle ==
Glen was asked by the legendary drummer Chris Slade to do a European Tour with his band Steel Circle, which was a band put together to perform the hits of Slade's career. This soon molded into Chris Slade's Timeline. Slade was a member of AC/DC as well as worked with David Gilmour, Manfred Mann, The Firm with Jimmy Page, Tom Jones and many more. This tour was for Slade's 50th anniversary in the music business.

== Michael Schenker Fest ==
In 2016, Glen and Ted McKenna rejoined Michael Schenker for Michael Schenker Fest - a Celebration of the musical career of the rock guitar legend, with several of his former singers. They recorded on August 24, 2016 in Tokyo the live DVD and double CD package Tokyo International Forum Hall A (release in 2017) and 2018 their first studio album Resurrection. Ted McKenna died on 19 January 2019, and was replaced by the german Bodo Schopf. The band recorded 2019 their follow up studio album Revelation. In 2022 Michael Schenker Fest reverted to being MSG and the line up of the band changed and Glen was no longer involved.

== The Bass Business ==
Around 2018, Glen decided it was time to put all his stories and his experiences on paper. As a result, he collaborated with author and former SAHB Manager Martin Keilty to write a book called The Bass Business which received reasonable success and sales. There is talk of a second book as Glen has so many stories he could not fit them into the one book! Nothing has been confirmed on this as of yet.

== The Outfit Featuring Chris Glen ==
Glen performs fairly regularly with a revised version of The Outfit mainly in the Glasgow and Edinburgh circuit. They are now known as The Outfit Featuring Chris Glen as opposed to Chris Glen & The Outfit. Lead guitarist Peter Higgins has taken the reins of the project and in 2022 the band recorded their first EP and are currently working on a debut studio album yet to be named. The band feature Peter Higgins on Guitar, Chris Aylward on Lead Vocals and Guitar, and John Clelland on Drums. Occasionally they use keyboards and it is known that they use local and respected players and former band members Stuart Clyde and David Cowan respectively when required. In recent gigs, The Outfit have shared the stage with SAHB tribute band The SAHB Experience as well as the reformed sin'dogs and Tyson Schenker (Michael Schenker's son) band MadreSun.

== Currently ==
Due to health related issues, Glen is no longer able to tour extensively as he is currently awaiting surgery on his knees. Regardless of this, Glen has performed all over the world and is still regarded as one of the best players in the business. Glen still attends gigs as regularly as he can to support upcoming bands and is part of the Shock City Promotions team based in Glasgow who put on bands in various venues throughout the UK.
