= Zal Cleminson =

Scottish guitarist

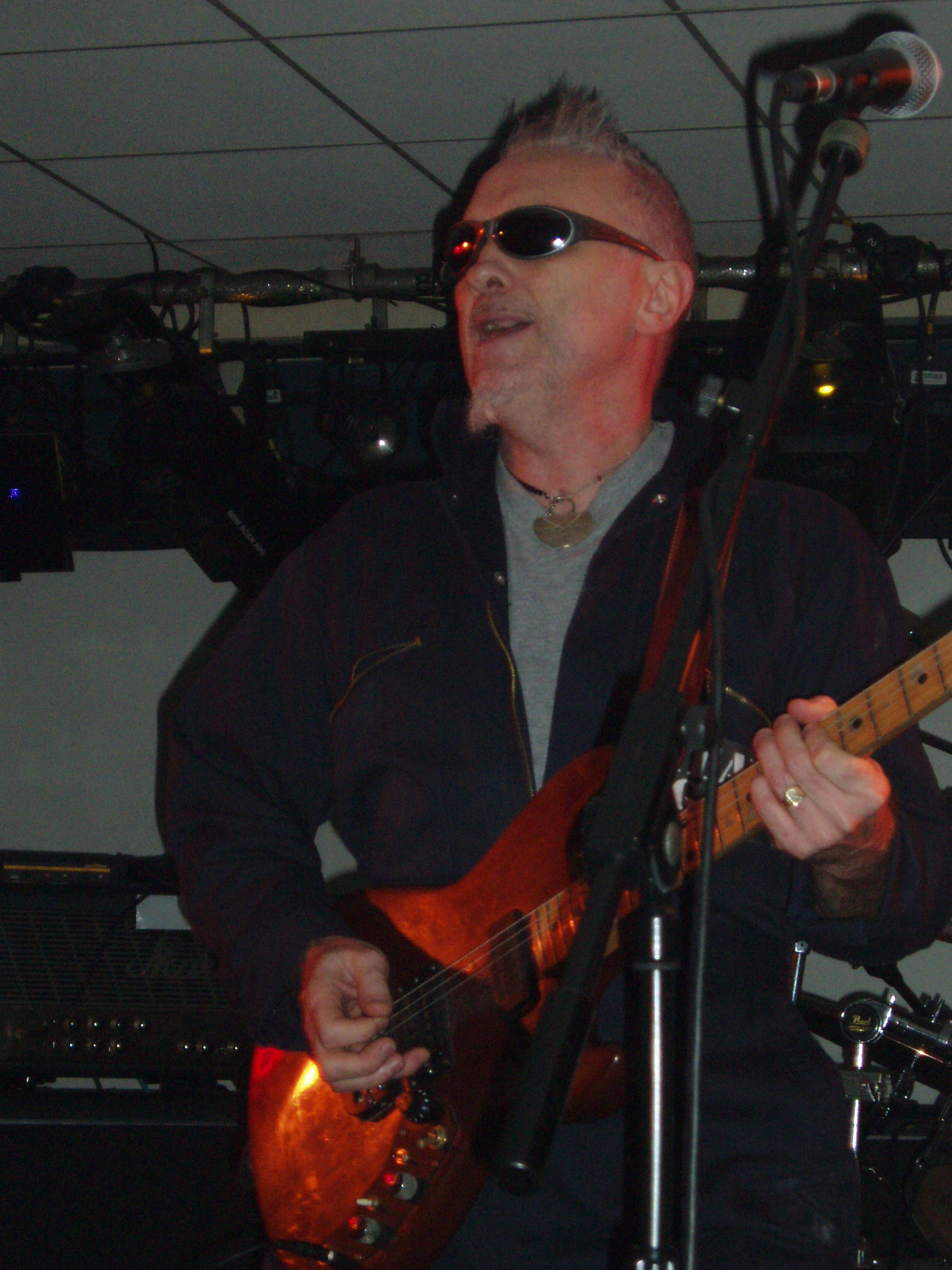
- Zal Cleminson, 2004

Background information
- Born: Alistair Macdonald Cleminson; 4 May 1949 (age 77); Glasgow, Scotland
- Genres: Hard rock; blues rock; glam rock; heavy metal
- Instrument: Guitar
- Years active: 1964–2008; 2017–present

Alistair Macdonald "Zal" Cleminson (born 4 May 1949) is a Scottish guitarist, best known for his role in the Sensational Alex Harvey Band between 1972 and 1978. He was subsequently a member of Nazareth for three years. In 2017, Cleminson put together a new rock band - /sin'dogs/, which recorded and released a four-song EP and an album, featuring nine original songs. /sin'dogs/ toured Scotland, England and Sweden in the years following.

== Early days / Tear Gas ==
A self-taught guitarist, influenced by guitarists such as Wes Montgomery and Chuck Berry. During the mid-1960s he joined his first band the Bo-Weavels which performed mainly Tamla Motown & Stax Records music. In the early 1970s he left the Bo Weavels and joined Glasgow-based band Tear Gas. The line up of Tear Gas were: Andi Mulvey on lead vocals, Zal Cleminson on lead guitar, Eddie Campbell on keyboards, Chris Glen on bass guitar, and Gilson Lavis on drums.

Mulvey had previously sung with local beat group the Poets. After changing from their original name, Mustard, they chose Tear Gas as a variation on the same theme. However, Mulvey was soon replaced by keyboard player and vocalist David Batchelor, and Lavis (who later played with Squeeze) by Richard Monro from Ritchie Blackmore's Mandrake Root. It was this line-up who made their recorded debut with 1970's Piggy Go Getter, an album typical of the time with its extended guitar and keyboard passages. However, they were more playful than some - ‘We were a really loud band. In fact we used to open with Jethro Tull's 'Love Story', which started very softly and the crowd would drift towards the front. Then we'd turn the volume up and blow everyone out of the hall.’ Later in 1970 Hugh McKenna replaced Batchelor while his cousin Ted McKenna (ex-Dream Police) took over from Monro on drums. Itinerant musician Ronnie Leahy also contributed keyboards in Batchelor's absence, though the group were by now living in penury six to a room in Shepherd's Bush, London. A second album was recorded for release on Regal Zonophone Records but again met with a lacklustre response from the critics despite regular touring in an effort to establish themselves. Tear Gas met with an experienced vocalist called Alex Harvey, this was arranged by the Management Company. Harvey joined Tear Gas and the band's name was changed to The Sensational Alex Harvey Band.

== The Sensational Alex Harvey Band ==
Starring their careers as The Sensational Alex Harvey Band (SAHB) in August 1972, they were primarily performing material already written by Harvey.

By 1973, they adopted stage costumes: Harvey wore vaudeville-like clothes and his trademark striped shirt, while Cleminson assumed the identity of a "mime", in full make-up and green-yellow jumpsuit, and Glen wore a dark blue jumpsuit reminiscent of a superhero costume incorporating a lighter blue codpiece. SAHB produced a succession of abums and tours throughout the 1970s. The band did not enjoy large-scale success in the United States as it had in the UK, though they did acquire a cult following in certain US cities, notably Cleveland, where the group first played at the Agora Ballroom in December 1974.

In January 1974, the band went into Advision Studios in London with the American producer Shel Talmy to record a third album. By April, the sessions were finished and the album was mixed. However, the band and management had some reservations about the overall sound and decided to scrap the entire album. Talmy returned to Los Angeles with his tapes. Most of the song titles appeared on the official album The Impossible Dream later that year with a different producer, though the songs were dramatically changed. The original recordings formed an album called Hot City, released in 2009 by Major League Productions.

The SAHB recorded eight albums in five years. They participated in tours supporting Jethro Tull, Slade, The Who and Frank Zappa.

The band had top 40 hits in Britain including "Delilah", a cover version of the Tom Jones hit, which reached number seven in 1975. "Delilah" was added to their live set in order for Cleminson, Glen and Harvey to do a dance in the middle of the song. But the record company mixed and released the song without the band's knowledge or permission while they were on tour in America, which required the band to fly back to the UK to perform on Top Of The Pops and shows such as The Old Grey Whistle Test as the song had entered the UK Singles Chart.

The Boston Tea Party was released in June 1976 and the song "Anthem" was a top 30 hit in Australia in 1975.

Harvey left the group late in 1975; the other members continued with the name "SAHB (without Alex)". They recorded a new album, Fourplay, in February 1977. The album steered towards solid pop-rock with progressive influences. Harvey re-joined the group in mid-1977. Constant touring and album releases exhausted the band and keyboardist Hugh McKenna exited after the release of SAHB Stories due to stress. He was replaced with Tommy Eyre, who had worked with Gerry Rafferty prior to this, but at that point the band's chemistry had gone and Harvey's drinking was getting heavier, so the band disbanded shortly after the release of their final studio album Rock Drill. Harvey died of heart failure on 4 February 1982 in Belgium.

During the success of SAHB, Cleminson had a distinctive stage presence with SAHB owing to his white-face mime makeup. He started wearing the mime makeup when the band started playing larger venues, so they could see what he was doing on stage easier. Cleminson has said "The mime face came about when I went to Paris to see Marcel Marceau performing and it gave me an idea to have an alter ego and mess around with pulling faces when I played so it gave the audience something to watch and with bigger gigs – more people could see what I was up to".

== The Zal Band ==
When SAHB split up in 1977, the band were still under contract with Mountain Management, preventing them from performing or joining any other band, so the management company decided to change the band name from SAHB to the Zal Band as they felt Cleminson second in popularity and his image was recognisable. The band recruited The Tubes' vocalist Leroi Jones and 19 year old Billy Rankin on guitar, who later played with Nazareth. But the band dissolved when their contract ended.

== Nazareth ==
In 1979, Cleminson joined Nazareth and recorded two albums with them, 1979's No Mean City and 1980's Malice in Wonderland. Cleminson was part of the band for three years.

== Tandoori Cassette ==
Tandoori Cassette was an early 1980s short-lived rock band formed by Cleminson and Barriemore Barlow after leaving Jethro Tull in 1980, with Charlie Tumahai from Bebop Deluxe on bass, and Ronnie Leahy from Stone the Crows on keyboards. They recorded an EP called Angel Talk but disbanded shortly after.

== Elkie Brooks ==
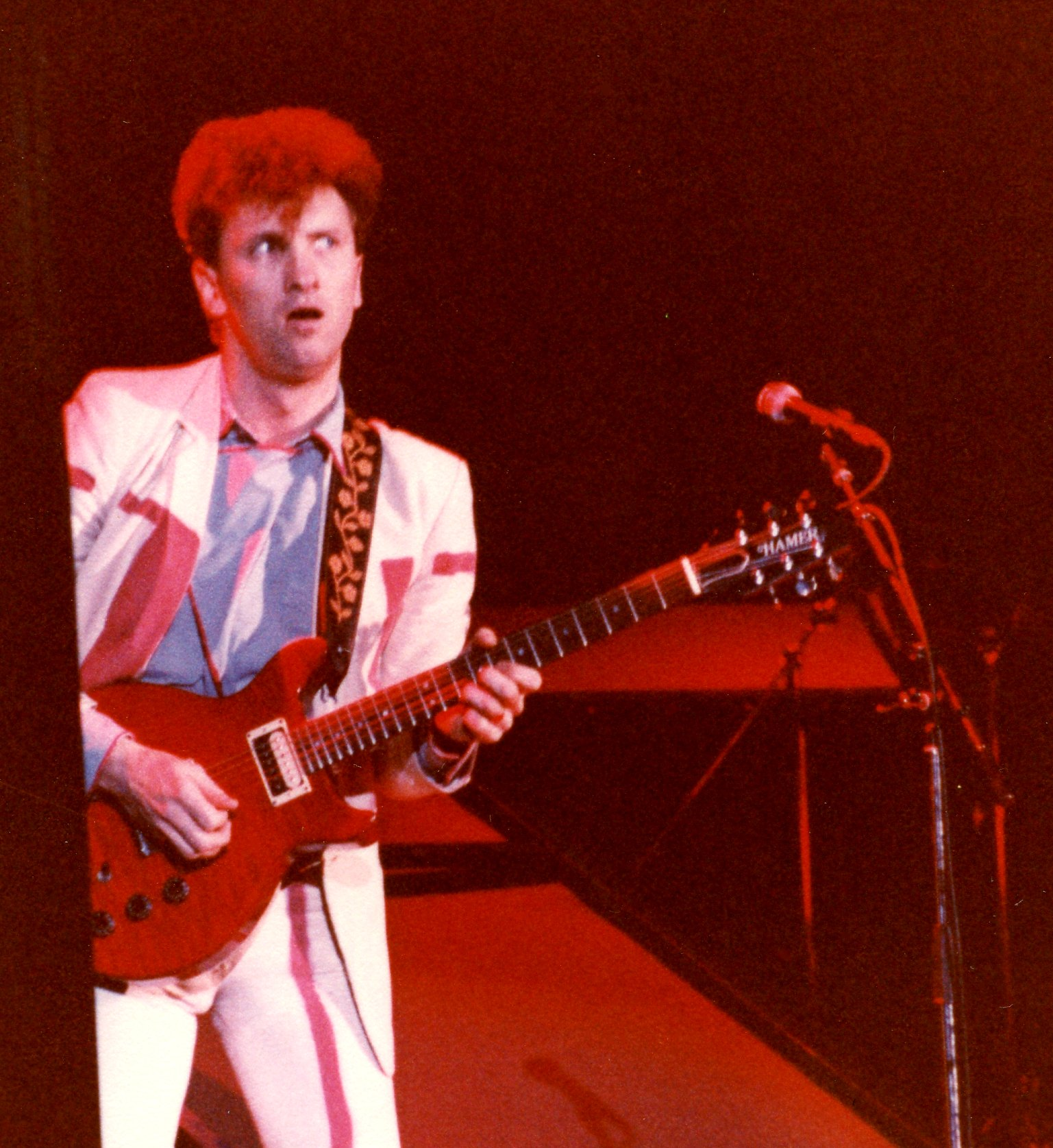
Zal Cleminson in Elkie Brooks band 1983

Cleminson was a guitarist with singer Elkie Brooks on her tours throughout the 1980s. He wrote and played on Brooks' album Minutes as well as one track on No More the Fool.

== Midge Ure ==
Cleminson toured with Midge Ure on his Gift World Tour 1985.

== Bonnie Tyler ==
He toured with Bonnie Tyler on several tours and performed some of her biggest hits such as "Holding Out For A Hero" and "It's a Heartache".

== Back at the day job ==
When the session work decreased, Cleminson returned to day-to-day jobs including as a computer engineer and reading electric meters.

== The Party Boys ==
During the 1990s Cleminson played with The Party Boys, a casual band formed by SAHB drummer Ted McKenna. The concept was the band would be a 'super group' who would be able to change members and vocalists at various times, featured former Marillion's Fish and Nazareth's Dan McCafferty and Billy Rankin as vocalists. This project slowly weaved into a reformed version of The Sensational Alex Harvey Band with another permanent vocalist.

== 1990s ==
SAHB official reformed in 1993, with Zero Zero vocalist Stevie Doherty. They enjoyed relative success touring in the UK and Europe, performing at various festivals such as the Tarlair Music Festival, as well as recording a live album titled Live in Glasgow 93 which was recorded in Minstrels. This line up of SAHB disbanded shortly after this and Cleminson decided to take some time out.

== SAHB reborn ==
In 2002, SAHB reformed briefly with ex-Nazareth guitarist Billy Rankin on vocals for a tribute concert held to Frankie Miller at the Barrowlands, Glasgow which demonstrated that there was still an audience and a diehard following for SAHB and their music. They also performed at the King Tuts venue in Glasgow where a popular bootleg of the gig was recorded but again disbanded shortly after before reuniting two years later.

== SAHB in the 21st century ==
In 2004, SAHB reunited for the last time. They returned to their 1970s style, but with a heavier and grungier approach which included Cleminson bringing back the iconic make-up. This time it was a different look, more Brandon Lee's Crow with black sunglasses. The band needed someone who was not just a rock vocalist, but someone who could perform in the same way Harvey did so they auditioned Max Maxwell who was mostly known as a dancer on Top Of The Pops, but also had a reputation in and around Glasgow with bands such as Edith & The Ladies and The. They toured and released a live album Zalvation: Live In The 21st Century in 2005. The tour was initially a farewell but due to its popularity, they continued, with tours and festivals between 2004 and 2008 including Sweden Rock Festival, Wickerman Festival, USC Festival, and a mini-tour of Australia in 2007.

In 2006, he appeared in his début acting role as Wilson in the western film A Shot in the West, for which he wrote the theme music.

== Ze Suicide and Oskura ==
As well as performing with SAHB, Cleminson was a member of the now-disbanded outfits Ze Suicide and Oskura. But these projects did not succeed. Cleminson appeared on the promotional photo shoots for both bands.

== Retirement ==
In early 2008, Cleminson announced his retirement from the music industry. and moved to Cyprus. He bought a cheap acoustic guitar and developed ideas for what would initially be his first solo album. Around 2016, Cleminson was collaborating with Alan Mair on a project called Electric Brae.

== The Evolution of /sin'dogs/ ==
Cleminson knew of a keyboardist from Glasgow, David Cowan, who was in an Alex Harvey tribute band called The SAHB Experience. He had attended some of their shows and was impressed by their musicianship and attention to detail. He contacted Cowan and asked if he was interested in collaborating with him on the material and ideas he had. Cowan was also a friend with SAHB drummer Ted McKenna, and had also been a band member of SAHB bassist Chris Glen's band The Outfit.

As the material neared completion, Cleminson and Cowan thought these songs would sound great live and they toyed with the idea of forming a band to perform them. They organised a few rehearsals with the band and sin'dogs were born.

Not all members of The SAHB Experience were able to play on it. Vocalist Andy Massie had a full-time job, as did drummer Chris Killen, so they brought in drummer Scott Cowie and Cleminson decided to be both guitarist and lead singer. The band performed their first mini-UK tour at the end of 2017 and recorded their first self-titled EP. This was followed by a full UK tour in 2018 and time in the studio to record their debut album titled VOL.1. The band also made appearances at some festivals which included Cropredy, Sweden Rock Festival, A New Day Festival, and Cambridge Rock Festival. They also performed a sell-out show at the Barrowlands Ballroom supporting Mott The Hoople. In 2018, Cowie left band to concentrate on his day job and career as a college lecturer and was replaced by Louie Malvessi. In November 2018, Malvessi left to focus on his session work. He was replaced by Carlos Marin.

== End of the road for /sin'dogs/ ==
Around October 2019, Cleminson announced that he was leaving sin'dogs. The remaining members of /sin'dogs/ moved on to other projects. Keyboardist David Cowan formed his own band, The Meissner Effect, and continues to tour with The SAHB Experience alongside bassist Nelson McFarlane. Drummer Carlos Marin briefly joined rock outfit Gin Annie, before leaving and forming his own band Humanity Deluxe.

== Orphans Of The Ash ==
Since the demise of the band in October 2019, Cleminson and Willie worked together on a new project 'Orphans Of The Ash' and have released a studio album in November 2022 titled Ellipsis. Plans are currently in place for Orphans Of The Ash to begin working on their second album which is yet to be titled. The album Ellipsis was released on 29 November 2022.

Guthrie Govan has cited Cleminson as one of his most important influences and considers him to have been "his Jimmy Page" in his early guitar development.
