= Ted McKenna =

Scottish drummer (1950–2019)

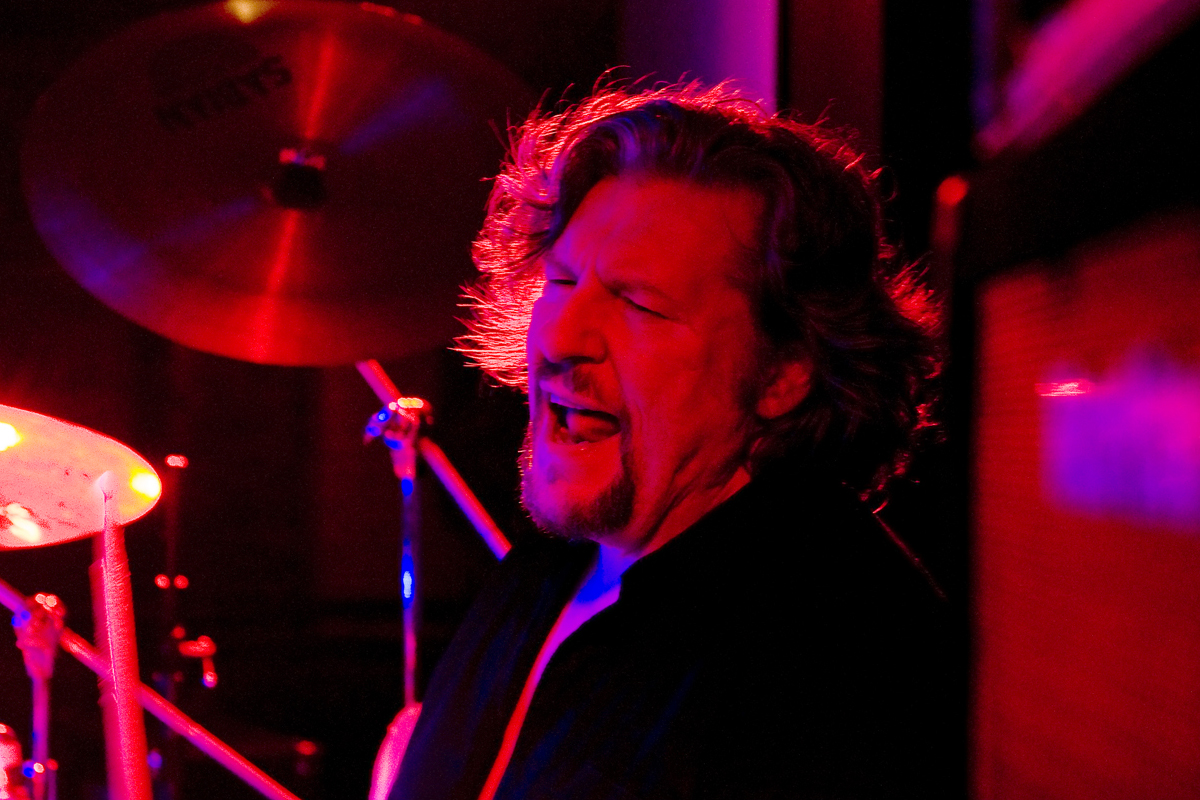
- McKenna performing in 2009

Background information
- Born: Edward McKenna; 10 March 1950; Lennoxtown, Stirlingshire, Scotland
- Died: 19 January 2019 (aged 68)
- Genres: Hard rock, blues rock, progressive rock, glam rock, heavy metal, rock and roll
- Occupation: Drummer
- Years active: 1966–2019
- Formerly of: Rare Breed (1969), Dream Police (1970), Tear Gas (1971), The Sensational Alex Harvey Band (1972–1978), Rory Gallagher (1978–1981), Greg Lake, Gary Moore (1981–1983), The Michael Schenker Group (1983–1984), Womack & Womack (1988), McKenna's Gold (1988), Ian Gillan (1990), The Party Boys (1992–1993), Gwyn Ashton (2004), The Paul Rose Band (2006–2011), The Rhumboogie Orchestra (2009), Band of Friends (2011–2019), Michael Schenker Fest (2016–2019)

Edward McKenna (10 March 1950 – 19 January 2019) was a Scottish drummer who played with The Sensational Alex Harvey Band, Rory Gallagher, The Greg Lake Band, and The Michael Schenker Group. He also toured with Ian Gillan for a short period of time in 1990, alongside fellow former SAHB member, bassist Chris Glen. He lectured in Applied Arts at North Glasgow College from 1996 to 2011.

== Biography ==
McKenna was born in Lennoxtown, Stirlingshire. He was educated at St Patrick's High School, Coatbridge. His studies included double bass lessons at school, several piano lessons, and a year under Glasgow big band veteran, Lester Penman. He was the drummer of The Sensational Alex Harvey Band from 1972 to 1978, and then worked with artists including Rory Gallagher, 1978–1981; Greg Lake & Gary Moore in The Greg Lake Band, 1981–82; the Michael Schenker Group (MSG), 1982–84; Bugatti & Musker, 1982; Ian Gillan Band; during the Naked Thunder World Tour and worked on a solo album for Nazareth singer Dan McCafferty in 1975.

== Early years ==
Before SAHB formed, McKenna started his career in a band called Rare Breed and also had a brief spell with Dream Police before joining up with Chris Glen, Zal Cleminson in Tear Gas where his cousin Hugh McKenna also joined. Tear Gas had got to a point where they had got as big as they could get in Scotland and if they didn't make changes then the band would fold. So they were introduced to Alex Harvey through their manager Eddie Tobin who at that time, Alex was looking for a band. They got together at Thor Studios in Glasgow and the first song they played together was Midnight Moses and within a matter of minutes, they knew the band was going to work and The Sensational Alex Harvey Band was born.

SAHB as they were better known achieved more success as a live band as they were at one point the highest grossing live band in the UK and were touring with reputable acts such as Jethro Tull, The Who, and Slade. They released eight albums in five years; the last being Rock Drill as the band had split just before the release of the album.

== Rory Gallagher Band (1978–1981) ==
After SAHB, McKenna joined up with Irish Blues guitarist Rory Gallagher and performed on three albums. The albums were Photo-Finish, Top Priority, and a live album Stagestruck. McKenna was with Gallagher for three years before leaving the band to participate in what he called at the time a supergroup.

== Greg Lake and Gary Moore (1981–1982) ==
In 1981 after departing Rory Gallagher's band, McKenna joined forces with another Irish guitarist Gary Moore and bassist Greg Lake. This band recorded two studio albums Greg Lake and Maneouvres. They also released a live album recorded at the Hammersmith Odeon called Greg Lake In Concert.

== Michael Schenker Group (1982–1984) ==
After leaving Gary Moore's band McKenna met up with his old SAHB bassist Chris Glen at the 'Funny Farm' in London where all the touring musicians would hang out. It was there he was introduced to the German guitarist Michael Schenker who was looking for a drummer after the departure of Cozy Powell to Whitesnake. It was here he joined the Michael Schenker Group

McKenna was now at the peak of his career, performing shows all over the world, and recorded two studio albums with the Michael Schenker Group, Assault Attack and Built To Destroy. The band also released a live album Rock Will Never Die in 1984. Shortly after the release of this live album, McKenna decided to leave MSG as Chris Glen had also departed due to Michael Schenker's behaviour.

== Session work / McKenna's Gold / Womack & Womack (Mid 80s) ==
After MSG, McKenna began doing session work for many bands and artists, as well as TV work. Some of his work included Billy Rankin on his solo album Growing Up Too Fast which was a big hit in the US. McKenna also worked with Bugatti & Musker, performed several tracks on the album Phenomena which featured some of the top rock musicians at the time, and even formed his first ever solo project McKenna's Gold which featured a young and very talented guitarist Julian Hutson-Saxby who would later replace Zal Cleminson in SAHB in 2008. McKenna's Gold band also had bassist Alex Bowler, keyboardist Richard Franklin, and vocalist Charles Bowyer. This project soon disbanded when McKenna was approached by Womack & Womack in which he performed live shows as well as perform on the music video for their hit single Teardrops where he also appeared live on Top Of The Pops to promote the single.

== Ian Gillan Band (1990) ==
After the tour with Womack & Womack finished, McKenna began working with the legendary Deep Purple vocalist Ian Gillan alongside his old pal and SAHB/MSG bassist Chris Glen for a World Tour of Ian's solo album Naked Thunder. This tour lasted around a year.

== Back home to Scotland / The Party Boys (1991–1992) ==
In 1991, McKenna moved back to Scotland and it was here he put together a plan to form a new project which featured guest vocalists and were called The Party Boys. This band originally had bassist Alan Thomson, most known for his work with John Martyn and David Gilmour, and keyboardist Ronnie Leahy who had worked with numerous acts over the years, including Jack Bruce, Jon Anderson, and Steve Howe. McKenna also brought in SAHB guitarist Zal Cleminson to complete the musical line-up and had vocalists such as Stevie Doherty from Zero Zero, ex-Marillion vocalist Fish, and Nazareth lead vocalist Dan McCafferty who would all come in a various times to stand in as special guests. Audience demand for SAHB songs in the set was high from the beginning. Alan Thomson and Ronnie Leahy stepped down which opened the door for Chris Glen and Hugh McKenna to come on board. It was at this point they decided to revive the SAHB name.

== SAHB MkII (1992–1995) ==
The new SAHB were riding high, performing shows throughout the UK and Europe, recorded a live album called "Live In Glasgow 93", but around the end of 1994 Stevie Doherty quit the band and was replaced for their final show with Stone The Crows vocalist Maggie Bell.

== North Glasgow College (1998–2011) ==
After SAHB split, McKenna was back doing session work with various bands, and in 1998 he got what he termed "a real job". He became a lecturer at North Glasgow College to teach young aspiring musicians about the music industry and the dangers of the music world if you don't know what you are doing. Even though McKenna was now working full time in education, he still found time to go out and perform live and record for bands which he did.

== SAHB MkIII (2002–2003) ==
In 2002, SAHB reformed for one night only which was for a benefit concert held at The Barrowlands, Glasgow for the legendary Frankie Miller. The band recruited ex-Nazareth guitarist Billy Rankin to perform three songs on the night. The even was successful enough that they decided to do their own show at King Tuts, Glasgow where they recorded an unofficial live album. The band decided to take a year or so out to consider their options and it was during this time they were introduced to the man that would become their next frontman.

== SAHB: The Final Chapter (2004–2008) ==
In 2004, SAHB with remaining members Zal Cleminson, Hugh McKenna, and Chris Glen introduced vocalist Max Maxwell, formerly of The Shamen to be their final frontman and go out as SAHB one more time but this time perform with full props and make up the way they had done in the 70's. Their 2004 farewell tour as it was billed was so successful they decided to carry it on and toured every year consistently between 2004 and 2008, performing at various festivals including The Wickerman Festival and The Sweden Rock Festival. In this time they released the live album Zalvation, which was the band's first official release since Rock Drill in 1977 with Alex Harvey. They performed tours in the UK, Europe and Australia, as well as two sell-out Christmas shows in 2006 and 2007 at the ABC in their hometown of Glasgow.

In 2008, Cleminson left the band and retired from performing, and was replaced by guitarist Julian Hutson Saxby for the last remaining shows before calling it a day.

== Other ventures ==
After SAHB, McKenna performed with various acts such as the Frank O'Hagan band, the Rhumboogie Orchestra, Gwyn Ashton, American/Canadian blues guitarist Amos Garrett before working with guitarist Paul Rose where he became an official member and worked on and off for a few years. The Paul Rose Band performed shows throughout the UK and Europe and recorded a studio album called White Mountain Road which was produced by Paul Rose. It was through this venture that he rekindled his relationship with his former bandmate and bassist Gerry McAvoy and they formed Band Of Friends which was a Celebration of the music of Rory Gallagher which featured Dutch Guitar Virtuoso Marcel Scherpenzeel

== Band Of Friends (2011–2019) ==
Band Of Friends formed around 2011 into 2012 and began building up the grass roots of fans and followers playing shows all over Europe and the UK. The vibe was great and the shows got bigger and it was soon after they decided to write and perform their own material. During Ted's time with the band they recorded two studio albums Too Much Is Not Enough, and Repeat After Me and the live album was called Live & Kickin. McKenna also won the 'Best Musician (performance)' award at the European Blues Awards 2015. Band of Friends soon departed with Marcel and they brought in Davy Knowles for an American Tour.

== Michael Schenker Fest (2016–2019) ==
In 2017, McKenna was approached by Michael Schenker's son Taro as Michael was putting together a new project with all four of the singers from MSG (Gary Barden, Graham Bonnet, Robin McAuley and Doogie White). The band also included bassist Chris Glen and guitarist/keyboardist Steve Mann who had worked with MSG during the McAuley Schenker Group era. The band, now known as the Michael Schenker Fest, performed in Japan an almost two-hour show of Michael's songs back catalogue on August 24, 2016. These recordings, under the title Live - Tokyo International Forum Hall A, were released in 2017 with an DVD and double CD. They also recorded together 2018 brand new material with the studio album Resurrection.

McKenna was now an official member of two groups at the same time and he was touring extensively with Michael Schenker Fest and Band Of Friends.

== Death ==
On 19 January 2019, at the age of 68, McKenna died of a haemorrhage during a routine operation for a hernia. He was due to start a tour of Japan with Michael Schenker Fest when he went in for surgery but died on the operating table due to losing too much blood during the procedure. McKenna had two children, Casey and Laura, as well as a young grandson.

== Band Of Friends / Michael Schenker Fest Continue to carry his legacy on ==
Band Of Friends are continuing to tour extensively throughout the UK and Europe with ex-Rory Gallagher drummer Brendan O'Neill, guitarist Paul Rose, and guitarist Jim Kirkpatrick who also plays with the band FM. For recording they occasionally bring in keyboardist David Cowan, a good friend of Ted's, and who is also part of a Sensational Alex Harvey tribute called The SAHB Experience. David contributed to the two-part lockdown albums Spotlight On The G-Man 1 and 2.

Ted's last ever stage performance was at the Cozy Powell Memorial Concert held at the Robin 2, Wolverhampton alongside fellow SAHB bassist Chris Glen.
