= Mitch Perry =

American guitarist (born 1961)

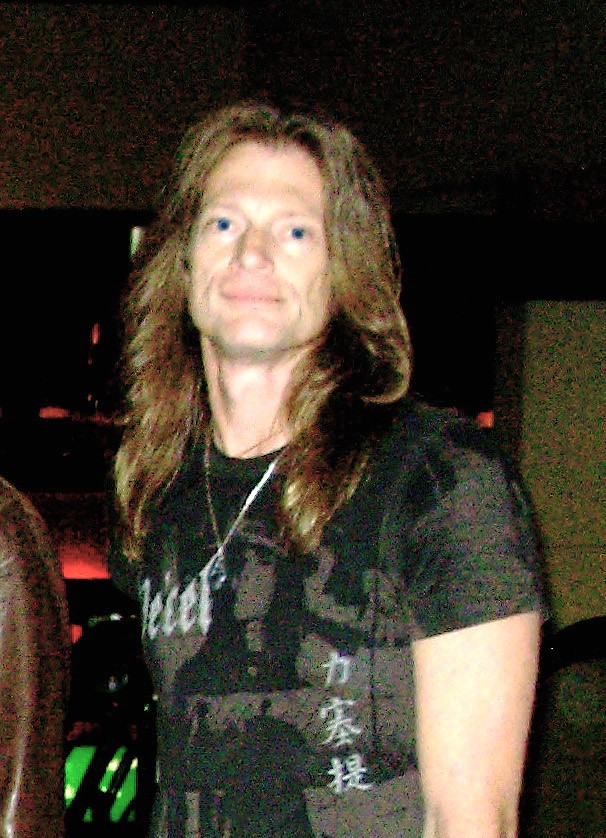
- Perry with Asia featuring John Payne in 2009

Background information
- Born: Mitch Perry Brownstein; July 3, 1961 (age 65); New York City, New York, U.S.
- Origin: Florida, U.S.
- Genres: Hard rock; glam metal; heavy metal; jazz fusion; pop rock; progressive rock
- Occupations: Musician; singer; producer; racecar driver
- Instruments: Guitar; keyboards; vocals
- Years active: 1979–present
- Member of: Mitch Perry Band
- Formerly of: McAuley Schenker Group; Asia featuring John Payne; Heaven; Bobby Blotzer's Ratt; Steeler; Cher; Talas
- Website: mitchperrygroup.com

Mitch Perry Brownstein (born July 3, 1961) is an American guitarist, keyboardist and record producer, best known for playing with artists including Alphonso Johnson, Michael Schenker, Edgar Winter, Lita Ford, The Sweet, Asia, Cher, Talas and Steeler.

== Early life ==
Perry was born in New York City. Between 1971 and 1974, Perry lived in Fulham, London and went to Westminster City School, after that the family moved to Florida. Perry started playing guitar when he lived in England, he was initially taught by his mom who showed him a few chords, he first got motived to play the instrument from a boy at his school. He played guitar along to Top of the Pops, including to "Rubber Bullets" by 10cc.

== Career ==
Perry was a member of a band called The Kids with Bruce Witkin (later of the Hollywood Vampires with Johnny Depp) when he was 14. When Perry got his first gig in California, Depp replaced him in the band. Perry moved to California to play with Alphonso Johnson (Weather Report, Santana) after being recommended by Pat Thrall who liked his style of playing, in that band he played with Vinny Appice, who would join Black Sabbath and Dio. The trio apparently recorded an album that was two weeks away from release before the A&R department at Electra was fired and the album was shelved. Perry briefly played in DuBrow, a spin off of Quiet Riot after Randy Rhoads left to join Ozzy Osbourne, with Kevin DuBrow, Rudy Sarzo and Drew Forsyth. He replaced Greg Leon for a few shows, before joining Glenn Hughes after being recommended by Ronnie James Dio. Perry was responsible for connecting Hughes with Pat Thrall to create the Hughes/Thrall project.

Following his stint with Hughes he played with Steeler with Ron Keel, replacing Yngwie Malmsteen. He was noticed by Billy Sheehan and joined his band Talas, appearing on live album Live Speed on Ice (1984). He joined Australian band Heaven in 1984, he played on their album Knockin' on Heaven's Door, on which he also played keyboards.

During this time Perry appeared as a guest in several works by artists such as Faster Pussycat, Keel, Frankie Miller and Graham Nash. In 1987 he joined McAuley Schenker Group, with German guitar virtuoso Michael Schenker and former Grand Prix vocalist Robin McAuley, replacing Steve Mann on guitar and keyboards. He played rhythm and lead guitar as well as backing vocals on the bands debut album, Perfect Timing. With McAuley Schenker he toured alongside Def Leppard and Whitesnake. He left the band in 1988 and was replaced by the returning Mann.

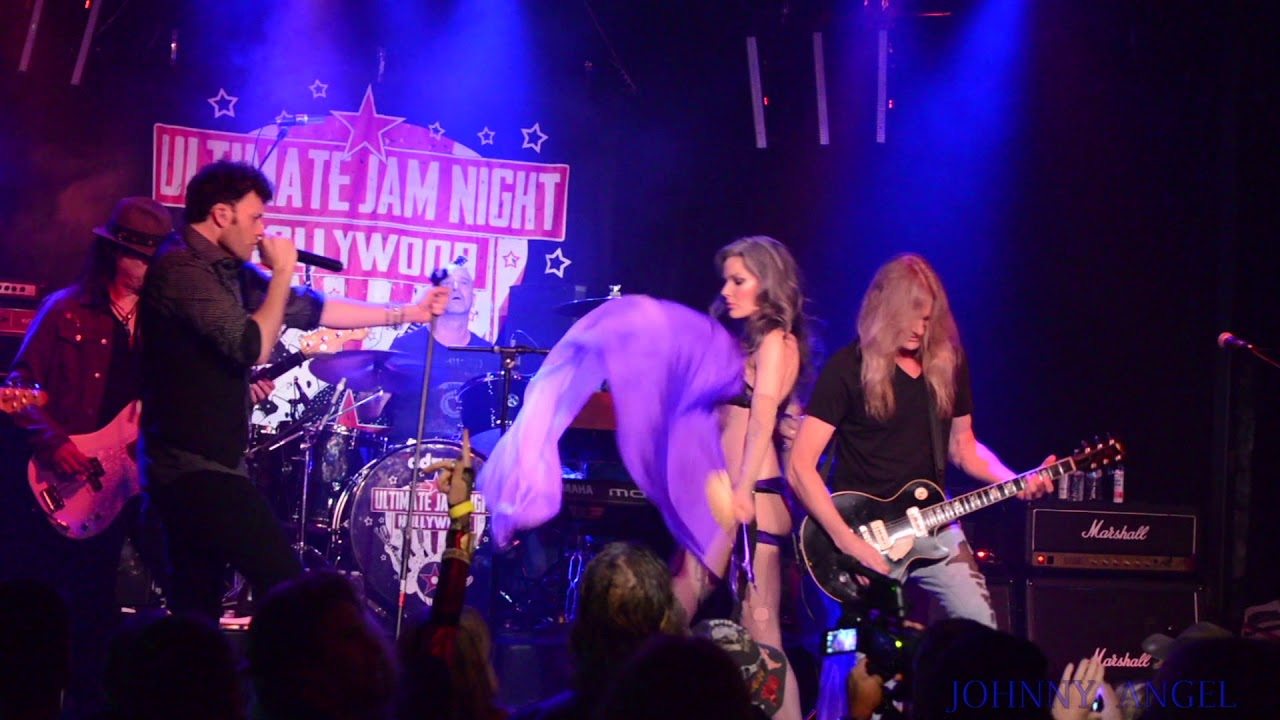
Perry (far right) at Ultimate Jam in 2018.

Perry was guitarist for Cher, he got the Cher gig after she decided that the person she had auditioned, she didn't like. A friend of his who was in her band recommended him, he toured for the 'Heart Of Stone' tour. Before going on tour with Cher he joined David Lee Roth's band as a replacement for Steve Vai for two weeks. After touring with Cher he formed a supergroup with Paul Shortino (Rough Cutt, Quiet Riot) and Sean McNabb (Quiet Riot, House of Lords) the project also included Rich Carlton and Matt Abts on drums and Michael Guy and Steve Fister on guitar who all contributed to the bands self titled album, which was later re-issued as No, No, Nikkie with drummer James Kottak also contributing. Badd Boyz morphed into 7% Solution with Shortino being replaced by Ralph Saenz (Steel Panther, L.A. Guns).

In 1994 Mitch joined Edgar Winter, after collaborating with the well-known drummer Carmine Appice in a project with which he participated in a tour called 'Super Rock Session' in Japan. He played with Winter for over eight years, playing with former Winter guitarist Rick Derringer and Ronnie Montrose. Perry left Winter in 2001 to become a full time racing car driver. Winter played saxophone on Perry's first solo album Wire To Wire (1996).

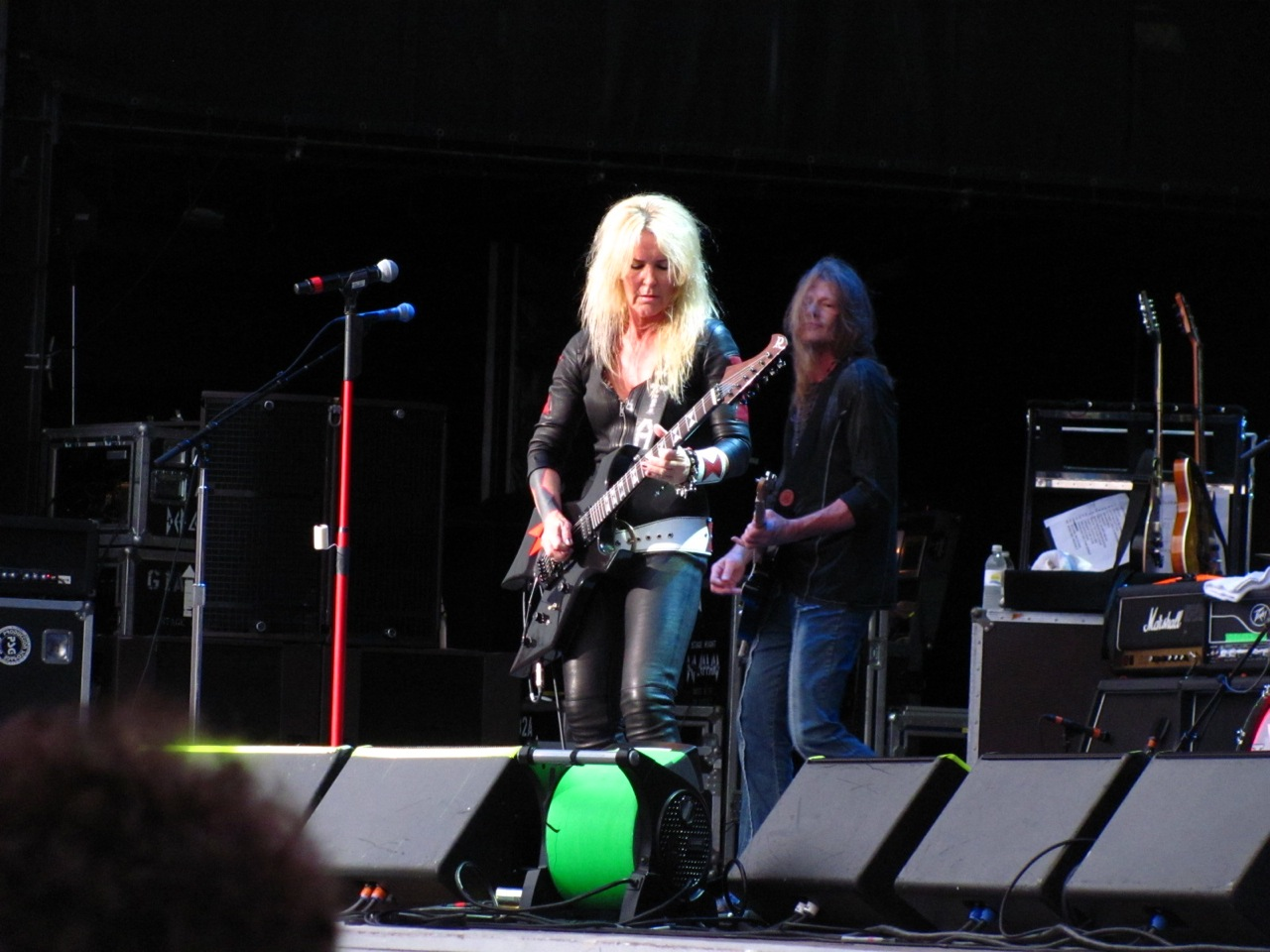
Perry (right; background) with Lita Ford in 2012.

In 2009, Perry joined Asia featuring John Payne, an offshoot of progressive rock band Asia by bassist and singer John Payne. He replaced Guthrie Govan, and continued to tour with the band until August 2011 when he was replaced by former Racer X, guitarist Bruce Bouillet. During the 2010s he was a member if former Runaways guitarist, Lita Ford's band, appearing on her live album The Bitch Is Back ... Live, In 2014 he left Lita Ford and joined The Sweet with founding member Steve Priest, a band which he continued to tour with until Priest's death in June 2020. In 2016 he joined Bobby Blotzer's Ratt as lead guitarist, the band at the time featured Blotzer on drums, Perry on lead guitar, Stacey Blades (L.A. Guns) on rhythm guitar, Brad Lang (Y&T) on bass and Joshua Alan on vocals. Perry toured with Blotzer's Ratt until they dispanded in 2017.

Perry also tours with his solo band the Mitch Perry Group, which includes Keith England, Shelly Bonet and Kara Turner, who front the band, drummer Tal Bergman, bassist Dan McNay and keyboardist Ed Roth.

== Discography ==
=== Solo ===
- Wire to Wire (1996)
- Better Late Than Never (1998)
- Music Box (2020)

Year	Artist	Title	Notes
1984	Talas	Live Speed On Ice	guitar
1985	Heaven	Knockin' On Heaven's Door	guitar
1986	Frankie Miller	Dancing In The Rain	guitar
1986	Keel	The Final Frontier	guitar on "Tears Of Fire"
1987	McAuley Schenker Group	Perfect Timing	guitar
1987	Faster Pussycat	Faster Pussycat	special appearance on "Babylon"
1987	Steve Goodman	Unfinished Business	electric guitar on "Don't Get Sand In It"
1988	Steeler	Undercover Animal	solo on "Knock Me Out"
1989	Talas, Billy Sheehan	Billy Sheehan: The Talas Years	guitar and vocals
1993	Black Bart	Bootleg Breakout	additional guitar
1994	James Christian	Rude Awakening	guitar on "Pleasure & Pain"
1994	Badd Boyz	Badd Boyz	guitar
1999	various	Little Guitars - A Tribute To Van Halen	performance alongside David Glen Eisley, Eric Singer and Marco Mendoza on "Little Guitars"
2000	various	A Tribute To Queen - We Will Rock You	guitar on "I Want It All (Julian Beeston Remix)" with Robin McAuley on vocals.
2000	Michael Schenker	Into The Arena 1972-1995 (Highlights & Overtures)	guitar on "Here Today-Gone Tomorrow" and "Gimme Your Love" from Perfect Timing
2009	Edgar Winter	Winter Blues	guitar on all tracks
2010	Erik Norlander	The Galactic Collective	guest guitar
2011	Lisa LaRue 2KX	Fast and Blue	lead guitar
2013	Lita Ford	The Bitch Is Back... Live	guitar
2014	Various	The Loner 2 − A Tribute To Jeff Beck	guitar on "Your Beckoned Call"
2015	Cherie Currie	Reverie	lead guitar on "Shades Of Me"
2020	MIWA	Hell Is Real	guitar
2022	Talas	1985	special guest guitar on "Crystal Clear"
