= Perfect Timing (McAuley Schenker Group album) =

Studio album by McAuley Schenker Group
- Released: October 12, 1987
- Recorded: 1987
- Studios: PUK Studios, Denmark; Scorpio Sound Studios and Studio M., Germany; Sound City Studios and Baby 'O Recorders, Los Angeles, USA
- Genre: Melodic hard rock · heavy metal
- Length: 42:57
- Label: Capitol / EMI
- Producer: Andy Johns

McAuley Schenker Group chronology
Perfect Timing (1987)	Save Yourself (1989)

Michael Schenker chronology
Rock Will Never Die (1984)	Perfect Timing (1987)	Save Yourself (1989)

Singles from Perfect Timing
- 1. "Gimme Your Love" / "Rock 'Til You're Crazy" Released: October 1987; 2. "Love Is Not a Game" / "Get Out" Released: January 1988; 3. "Follow the Night" / "Don't Stop Me Now" Released: April 1988

Professional ratings
Review scores
Source	Rating
AllMusic	2/5 stars
Collector's Guide to Heavy Metal	4/10
New Musical Express	2/10

Perfect Timing is the debut album recorded by the McAuley Schenker Group. It was the first collaboration between Michael Schenker and Robin McAuley (ex-Grand Prix and Far Corporation), resulting in Schenker's first top 100 US hit with the song "Gimme Your Love."

At this point, the band featured an eclectic mix of musicians in terms of nationalities. McAuley hails from Ireland originally, while Schenker and drummer Bodo Schopf are both from Germany. American guitarist Mitch Perry (aka Mitch Brownstein from the band The Kydz) had originally played in bass virtuoso Billy Sheehan's band, Talas (and had later joined the revamped Australian/American version of the band Heaven), while bassist Rocky Newton and guest keyboardist/rhythm guitarist Steve Mann were British and had previously been members of the band Lionheart. Mann would officially join the band for MSG's next album, replacing Perry.

== Track listing ==
- All songs written by Robin McAuley and Michael Schenker, except where noted.
1. "Gimme Your Love" (Rocky Newton, McAuley) – 4:52
2. "Here Today - Gone Tomorrow" – 4:38
3. "Don't Stop Me Now" – 3:56
4. "No Time for Losers" – 4:13
5. "Follow the Night" – 4:39
6. "Get Out" – 4:07
7. "Love Is Not a Game" (Newton, McAuley, Alan Nelson) – 4:12
8. "Time" (Schenker, McAuley, Newton) – 4:00
9. "I Don't Wanna Lose" – 4:15
10. "Rock 'Til You're Crazy" – 4:05

=== 2000 Japanese remaster bonus tracks ===
11. "Gimme Your Love" (Edit) (Newton, McAuley) – 4:25
12. "Follow the Night" (Edit) (Schenker, McAuley) – 4:21

== Personnel ==
Band members

- Robin McAuley – lead vocals
- Michael Schenker – lead guitar
- Mitch Perry – rhythm guitar, additional lead guitar on tracks 1 and 6, backing vocals
- Rocky Newton – bass guitar, backing vocals
- Bodo Schopf – drums

Additional musicians

- Steve Mann – keyboards and rhythm guitars

Production

- Andy Johns – producer, engineer, mixing
- Henrik Nilsson, Frank Wuttke, Jan Nemec, John Hanlon, Mark Stebbeds – engineers
- Paul Wertheimer – mixing
- Stephen Marcussen – mastering

== Charts ==
=== Album ===
Chart (1987)	Peak position
Finnish Albums (The Official Finnish Charts)	22
German Albums (Offizielle Top 100)	37
Swedish Albums (Sverigetopplistan)	21
US Billboard 200	95

Gimme Your Love

Chart (1987)	Peak position
US Mainstream Rock (Billboard)	40

Love Is Not a Game

Chart (1988)	Peak position
UK Singles (Official Charts)	79
