= Kevin Rooney =

Kevin Rooney may refer to:

- Kevin Rooney (comedian)
- Kevin Rooney (boxer)
- Kevin Rooney (ice hockey)
- Kevin J. Rooney, American politician
