= Contraband (band) =

American rock band

- Origin: Los Angeles, California, U.S.
- Genres: Hard rock; glam metal
- Years active: 1990–1991
- Past members: Richard Black; Michael Schenker; Tracii Guns; Share Pedersen; Bobby Blotzer

Contraband was a short-lived supergroup/side project that included members of several famous rock bands from the 1980s, such as Shark Island, McAuley Schenker Group, Ratt, L.A. Guns, and Vixen.

Contraband came to be after a Vixen and Ratt unplugged session on MTV.

The band released only one self-titled album in 1991 which received mediocre reviews. The album was a commercial failure and the band disbanded shortly after, while touring with Ratt. The song "Loud Guitars, Fast Cars & Wild, Wild Livin'" was included in the movie If Looks Could Kill soundtrack. In the US, the album charted at number 187. Their cover version of "All the Way from Memphis" appeared on the UK record chart in July 1991. "Loud Guitars, Fast Cars & Wild, Wild Livin'" was later covered as "Loud Guitars, Fast Cars & Wild, Wild Women" by Blue Tears in the early 1990s and released for the 2005 album Dancin' On the Back Streets. "Bad for Each Other" was previously recorded and released by Richard Black's main band Shark Island on their 1989 album Law of the Order.

== Band members ==
- Richard Black (Shark Island) – vocals
- Michael Schenker (Scorpions, UFO, MSG) – guitars, backing vocals
- Tracii Guns (L.A. Guns) – guitars, backing vocals
- Share Pedersen (Vixen) – bass guitar, backing vocals
- Bobby Blotzer (Ratt) – drums, backing vocals

== Contraband (1991) ==
Contraband
- Cover design by Hugh Syme & Frenchy Gauthier

Studio album by Contraband
- Released: May 6, 1991
- Recorded: American Recording Studio, Woodland Hills, Sound City Studios, Van Nuys, Cornerstone Studio, Chatsworth, Los Angeles, California
- Length: 43:06
- Label: Impact/EMI
- Producers: Kevin Beamish and Randy Nicklaus

Michael Schenker chronology
Save Yourself (1989)	Contraband (1991)	M.S.G. (1992)

Professional ratings
Review scores
Source	Rating
AllMusic	1.5/5 stars
Collector's Guide to Heavy Metal	6/10

=== Track listing ===
No.	Title	Writer(s)	Length
1.	"All the Way from Memphis"	Ian Hunter	4:56
2.	"Kiss by Kiss"	Michael Thompson, Mark Spiro	4:19
3.	"Intimate Outrage"	Spiro, Dann Huff, Phil Naish	4:57
4.	"Bad for Each Other"	Richard Black, Spencer Sercombe, Steve Diamond	4:28
5.	"Loud Guitars, Fast Cars & Wild, Wild Livin'"	Gregg Fulkerson, Michael Spears, Black	4:26
6.	"Good Rockin' Tonight"	Roy Brown	3:23
7.	"If This Is Love"	Steven Pasch, Anthony Krizan, Black	5:03
8.	"Stand"	Tim Feehan, Brian MacLeod	4:04
9.	"Tonight You're Mine"	Pasch, Krizan	4:43
10.	"Hang On to Yourself"	David Bowie	2:47

=== Credits ===
- Spencer Sercombe – guitars, backing vocals, musical director
- Steffan Presley – keyboards
- Kevin Beamish – backing vocals, producer, engineer, mixing
- Randy Nicklaus – producer, mixing
- Joe Barresi – engineer
- Steve Hall – mastering

== See also ==
- List of glam metal bands and artists
