= Nightmare: The Acoustic M.S.G. =

EP by McAuley Schenker Group
- Released: February 1992
- Studio: Studio 56, Hollywood, California; Right Track Studio, New York City
- Genre: Acoustic rock, instrumental rock
- Length: 29:38
- Label: EMI-Electrola
- Producer: Robin McAuley, Michael Schenker, Frank Filipetti

McAuley Schenker Group chronology
M.S.G. (1992)	Nightmare: The Acoustic M.S.G. (1992)	"Unplugged" Live (1992)

Nightmare: The Acoustic M.S.G. is an EP by the McAuley Schenker Group, released only in Japan, as a companion to the album M.S.G.. It contains acoustic versions of songs from M.S.G. and Save Yourself and follows the flow of unplugged recordings which were very trendy in those years. The recording of the unplugged version of these songs and their success in Germany and Japan inspired Schenker and McAuley to tour with only an acoustic set, which was later released in the live album "Unplugged" Live.

== Track listing ==
No.	Title	Writer(s)	Length
1.	"Anytime"	Robin McAuley, Steve Mann	5:45
2.	"We Believe in Love"	Michael Schenker, McAuley	5:19
3.	"What Happens to Me"	Schenker, McAuley	5:04
4.	"Bad Boys"	Schenker, McAuley	3:58
5.	"When I'm Gone"	McAuley, Jesse Harms	5:14
6.	"Nightmare (Single Edit)"	Schenker, McAuley	4:03
7.	"Message for the Japanese fans"		0:52
Total length:			29:38

== Track listing Single ==
No.	Title	Length
1.	"Nightmare - single edit"	4:08
2.	"Bad Boys - acoustic version"	4:01
3.	"What Happens to Me - acoustic version"	5:07
4.	"We Believe in Love"	5:22
5.	"Nightmare - album edit"	6:20
Total length:		25:00

== Performers ==
- Robin McAuley – vocals
- Michael Schenker – guitars

== Production ==
- Robin McAuley and Michael Schenker – producers
- Recorded at: Studio 56, Hollywood
- Mixed by: Doug Michael, Robin McAuley and Michael Schenker

"Never Ending Nightmare" (single edit)

- Produced and recorded by: Frank Filipetti
- Recorded at: Right Track Studios (NYC)
