= Arachnophobiac =

Studio album by Michael Schenker Group
- Released: June 16, 2003
- Recorded: Prairie Sun Recording Studios, Cotati, California, Field of Dreams Studios, Las Vegas
- Genre: Hard rock, heavy metal
- Length: 52:23
- Label: Shrapnel
- Producer: Mike Varney, Steve Fontano, Michael Schenker

Michael Schenker Group chronology
Be Aware of Scorpions (2001)	Arachnophobiac (2003)	Heavy Hitters (2005)

Michael Schenker chronology
The Plot (2003)	Arachnophobiac (2003)	Live on Earth (2003)

Professional ratings
Review scores
Source	Rating
AllMusic	3/5 stars

Arachnophobiac is the eleventh full-length studio album by German hard rock band Michael Schenker Group, the eighth not counting the McAuley Schenker Group era, released in 2003. The album was recorded with Michael Schenker on guitars, Chris Logan on vocals, Stuart Hamm on bass guitar and Jeremy Colson on drums.

== Track listing ==
All music by Michael Schenker, all lyrics and vocal melodies by Chris Logan:

No.	Title	Length
1.	"Evermore"	5:22
2.	"Illusion"	5:24
3.	"Arachnophobiac"	4:46
4.	"Rock and Roll Believer"	4:07
5.	"Sands of Time"	4:38
6.	"Weathervane"	5:02
7.	"Over Now"	5:47
8.	"One World"	4:06
9.	"Break the Cycle"	3:50
10.	"Alive"	4:50
11.	"Fatal Strike"	4:25
Total length:		52:23

== Personnel ==
=== Band members ===
- Chris Logan – vocals
- Michael Schenker – guitars, producer
- Stuart Hamm – bass
- Jeremy Colson – drums

=== Additional musicians ===
- Jeff Watson – lead guitar on tracks 3, 5, 7 and 9
- Jeff Okolowicz – bass on track 9

=== Production ===
- Mike Varney – producer
- Steve Fontano – producer, engineer
- Dave Stephens – graphic design

== Charts ==
Chart (2003)	Peak position
Japanese Albums (Oricon)	115
