= Under Construction =

Under Construction may refer to:

- Under Construction (film), a 2015 Bangladeshi film
- Under Construction (album), by Missy Elliott, 2002
- Under Construction, Part II, a 2003 album by Timbaland & Magoo
- Under Construction, a 2003 album by Amy Schugar
- Under Construction, a 1997 box set by Gentle Giant
- Under Construction, an early name of the band Prism
- Under Construction, a sub-label of British independent record label Breakbeat Kaos

== See also ==
- Underconstruction, a series of EPs by Gigi D'Agostino
- Construction
