= Be Aware of Scorpions =

Studio album by Michael Schenker Group
- Released: 24 October 2001 (Japan); 29 October 2001 (Europe); 13 November 2001 (USA)
- Recorded: Michael Schenker Records Recording Studio, Phoenix, Arizona
- Genre: Hard rock, heavy metal
- Length: 57:06
- Label: SPV/Steamhammer; Crown (Japan)
- Producer: Michael Schenker, Ralph Patlan

Michael Schenker Group chronology
The Unforgiven World Tour (1999)	Be Aware of Scorpions (2001)	Arachnophobiac (2003)

Michael Schenker chronology
Dreams and Expressions (2001)	Be Aware of Scorpions (2001)	Thank You 3 (2001)

Professional ratings
Review scores
Source	Rating
AllMusic	3/5 stars

Be Aware of Scorpions is the tenth full-length studio album by the Michael Schenker Group, the seventh not counting the McAuley Schenker Group incarnations, released in 2001.

== Track listing ==
All tracks by Schenker & Logan, except where noted

1. "No Turning Back" – 4:36
2. "My Time's Up" – 3:37
3. "Fallen the Love" (Schenker, Logan, Patlan) – 4:28
4. "Because I Can" (Logan) – 3:01
5. "How Will You Get Back" – 4:54
6. "Blinded by Technology" – 5:08
7. "Age of Ice" – 3:55
8. "Standin' on the Road" – 5:18
9. "Sea of Memory" – 4:57
10. "On Your Way " – 3:39
11. "Reflection of Your Heart" – 4:51
12. "Roll It Over" – 3:19
13. "Eyes of a Child" – 4:51
14. "Ride The Lightning" – 3:26 Bonus Track Japan

== Personnel ==
- Chris Logan - vocals
- Michael Schenker - lead & rhythm guitars
- Reverend "Rev" Jones - bass guitar
- Jeff Martin - drums, percussion, vocals on "Roll It Over"
- Ralph Patlan - producer, engineer, percussion and bass guitar on "Age of Ice and "My Times Up"

== Charts ==
Chart (2001)	Peak position
Japanese Albums (Oricon)	60
