= Adventures of the Imagination =

Studio album by Michael Schenker
- Released: March 7, 2000
- Studios: Prairie Sun Recording Studios, Cotati, California
- Genre: Instrumental rock
- Length: 53:42
- Label: Shrapnel
- Producers: Michael Schenker, Mike Varney

Michael Schenker chronology
The Unforgiven World Tour (1999)	Adventures of the Imagination (2000)	The Odd Trio (2000)

Professional ratings
Review scores
Source	Rating
AllMusic	4/5 stars

Adventures of the Imagination is a solo album released in 2000 by guitar virtuoso Michael Schenker. The album is Schenker's fourth all-instrumental effort and over-all critical response was positive.

== Track listing ==
All songs composed by Michael Schenker.

1. "Achtung Fertig, Los!" - 4:40
2. "Open Gate" - 3:32

Adventures Part One

3. "Three Fish Dancing" - 14:01
4. "Michael Schenker Junior" - 1:54

Adventures Part Two

5. "Aardvark in a VW Smoking a Cigar" - 13:46
6. "I Want to be with You" - 2:39

Adventures Part Three

7. "Old Man with Sheep on Mars" - 6:15
8. "At the End of the Day" - 3:58
9. "Hand in Hand" - 2:57

== Personnel ==
- Michael Schenker – all guitars
- John Onder – bass
- Aynsley Dunbar – drums

== Production ==
- Michael Schenker – producer
- Mike Varney – producer
- Ralph Patlan – associate producer, engineering, mixing
