= M.S.G. (McAuley Schenker Group album) =

Studio album by McAuley Schenker Group
- Released: December 11, 1991 (Japan); February 1992 (Europe)
- Recorded: 1991
- Studios: Rumbo Recorders, Preferred Sound, Sound City Studios, Track Records, Los Angeles, California, USA
- Genre: Melodic hard rock · heavy metal
- Length: 53:14
- Labels: Impact (USA); EMI (Europe and Japan)
- Producers: Kevin Beamish, Frank Filipetti

McAuley Schenker Group chronology
Save Yourself (1989)	M.S.G. (1991)	Nightmare: The Acoustic M.S.G. (1992)

Michael Schenker chronology
Contraband (1991)	M.S.G. (1991)	Nightmare: The Acoustic M.S.G. (1992)

Singles from M.S.G.
- 1. "Nightmare" Released: February 1992; 2. "When I'm Gone" Released: 1992

Professional ratings
Review scores
Source	Rating
Collector's Guide to Heavy Metal	6/10

M.S.G. is the third and final studio album by Michael Schenker and Robin McAuley's project, the McAuley Schenker Group. It was released in 1991 in Japan and 1992 in Europe.

Bass guitarist Jeff Pilson and drummer James Kottak previously played together in Michael Lee Firkins's backing band and Wild Horses. Kottak, who had also previously played in the original line-up of Kingdom Come, later joined Schenker's former band Scorpions.

== Track listing ==
All songs written by Michael Schenker and Robin McAuley except where noted.

1. "Eve" – 4:52
2. "Paradise" – 4:07
3. "When I'm Gone" (Jesse Harms, McAuley) – 4:47
4. "This Broken Heart" – 4:47
5. "We Believe in Love" – 5:12
6. "Crazy" (Rocky Newton, McAuley) – 4:53
7. "Invincible" – 3:42
8. "What Happens to Me" – 5:02
9. "Lonely Nights" – 4:29
10. "This Night Is Gonna Last Forever" (Newton, Kenny Stewart) – 4:51
11. "Never Ending Nightmare" – 6:24

Note that "Paradise" is not the same song as the one McAuley recorded with his old band, Grand Prix. Additionally, McAuley later recorded a song called "Crazy" on his 2025 solo album Soulbound, but it's not the same song as the one on this album.

== Personnel ==
Band members

- Robin McAuley – lead vocals
- Michael Schenker – guitars, backing vocals
- Jeff Pilson – bass
- James Kottak – drums

Additional musicians

- Jesse Harms – keyboards
- Rocky Newton – backing vocals
- Steve Mann – keyboards on "Never Ending Nightmare"

Production

- Kevin Beamish – producer, engineer, backing vocals
- Frank Filipetti – producer, engineer and mixing on "Never Ending Nightmare"
- Randy Nicklaus – executive producer
- Mick Gusauski – engineer, mixing
- Bruce Barris – engineer
- Steve Hall – mastering
- Hugh Syme – art direction, design

== Charts ==
Chart (1992)	Peak position
Finnish Albums (The Official Finnish Charts)	13
German Albums (Offizielle Top 100)	21
Swedish Albums (Sverigetopplistan)	36
Swiss Albums (Schweizer Hitparade)	36
