= The Unforgiven (album) =

Studio album by Michael Schenker Group
- Released: 11 February 1999
- Genre: Hard rock, heavy metal
- Length: 57:46
- Label: SPV/Steamhammer
- Producer: Michael Schenker, Mike Varney

Michael Schenker Group chronology
The Michael Schenker Story Live (1997)	The Unforgiven (1999)	The Unforgiven World Tour (1999)

Michael Schenker chronology
Thank You with Orchestra (1999)	The Unforgiven (1999)	The Unforgiven World Tour (1999)

Professional ratings
Review scores
Source	Rating
AllMusic	4/5 stars
Collector's Guide to Heavy Metal	8/10

The Unforgiven is the ninth full-length studio album by the Michael Schenker Group, the sixth not counting the McAuley Schenker Group era, released in 1999.

== Track listing ==
All music by Michael Schenker, all lyrics by Kelly Keeling

1. "Rude Awakening" – 5:02
2. "The Mess I've Made" – 4:31
3. "In and Out of Time" – 3:44
4. "Hello Angel" – 5:13
5. "Fat City N.O." – 4:16
6. "Tower" – 5:11
7. "Pilot of Your Soul" – 4:25
8. "Forever and More" – 5:43
9. "Turning off the Emotion" – 5:15
10. "Live for Today" – 4:40
11. "Illusion" – 3:57
12. "The Storm" – 5:18

== Personnel ==
Band members

- Kelly Keeling - lead vocals
- Michael Schenker - lead and rhythm guitars
- Seth "Sneef" Bernstein - keyboards and additional rhythm guitars
- John Onder - bass guitar
- Shane Gaalaas - drums

Additional musicians

- Jesse Bradman - keyboards on tracks 4, 8, 12 and background vocals on tracks 5, 11
- Louis Maldonado - rhythm guitar on "Rude Awakening" and background vocals on "Fat City N.O."

Production

- Michael Schenker, Mike Varney - producers
- Mark 'Mooka' Rennick, Ralph Patlan - engineers, mixing
- Joe Marquez - engineer
- Gene Cornelius, Robert McGraw - assistant engineers
- Greg Schnitzer - mastering at Prairie Sun Recording Studios, Cotati, California
- Dave Stephens - graphic design

== Charts ==
Chart (1999)	Peak position
German Albums (Offizielle Top 100)	92
Japanese Albums (Oricon)	58
