= Michael Gottlieb (director) =

American filmmaker (1945–2014)

- Born: Michael Bernard Gottlieb; April 12, 1945; New York, U.S.
- Died: May 23, 2014 (aged 69); La Cañada Flintridge, California, U.S.
- Occupations: Film director, screenwriter, video game producer
- Years active: 1985–2004
- Children: 3

Michael Bernard Gottlieb (April 12, 1945 – May 23, 2014) was an American film director, screenwriter, and video game producer. He is best known for directing the films Mannequin (1987) and A Kid in King Arthur's Court (1995).

Following the release of A Kid in King Arthur's Court, Gottlieb transitioned into video game industry, working as a producer for the remainder of his entertainment career.

On May 23, 2014, Gottlieb was killed in a motorcycle accident on the Angeles Crest Highway in La Cañada Flintridge, California. He was 69 years old. At the time of Gottlieb's death he was a professor of film at the ArtCenter College of Design in Pasadena, California, teaching screenwriting in both the graduate and undergraduate departments.

== Filmography ==
- Mannequin (1987) – director, writer
- The Shrimp on the Barbie (1990) – director (under the pseudonym Alan Smithee)
- Mannequin Two: On the Move (1991) – writer
- Mr. Nanny (1993) – director, writer
- A Kid in King Arthur's Court (1995) – director
