= Grand Prix (band) =

British rock band

- Origin: United Kingdom
- Genres: Hard rock, AOR
- Years active: 1978–1984
- Labels: RCA, Chrysalis
- Past members: Robin McAuley; Michael O'Donoghue; Ralph Hood; Andy Beirne; Phil Lanzon; Bernie Shaw

Grand Prix were an English hard rock and pop rock band, active between 1978 and 1984 and notable for featuring two future members of Uriah Heep.

== History ==
Grand Prix were founded in 1978 under the name Paris. They changed their name to Grand Prix in 1980 with the lineup of Bernie Shaw on lead vocals, Michael O'Donoghue on guitar, Ralph Hood on bass, Andy Beirne on drums and Phil Lanzon on keyboards. All five members performed harmony vocals, while Lanzon would contribute the occasional lead vocal, as illustrated on such songs as "Which Way Did the Wind Blow?".

In 1980, the band released their debut self-titled album on RCA Records. "Which Way Did the Wind Blow?" was released as a single, with music videos being filmed for it and two other songs from the album, "Feel Like I Do" and "Westwind". These videos showed the band playing on a stage with no audience.

In 1981, Shaw left the band and was replaced by Robin McAuley, who would record two more albums with the group, There for None to See (1982) and Samurai (1983), before they disbanded in 1984. Lanzon, McAuley, and O'Donoghue briefly carried on under the name Operator recruiting former Motörhead drummer Phil Taylor and former The Sensational Alex Harvey Band and Michael Schenker Group bassist Chris Glen.

== Post-Grand Prix activities ==
Shaw and Lanzon would end up joining Uriah Heep as that band's vocalist and keyboardist, respectively, in 1986, and to this day they remain the band's longest-serving keyboardist and vocalist. Lanzon also worked with The Sweet from 1985 to '88 juggling Sweet and Heep duties for a time. O'Donoghue went on to join Bronz and in the early Nineties spent a year with Ian Gillan recording the Naked Thunder album, credited as Mick O'Donoghue. After running a music shop in the seaside town of Folkestone, Kent for twenty years, O'Donoghue retired. Hood became a member of multi-national band Tarzen, led by Danny Peyronel of Heavy Metal Kids and UFO fame, and appeared on their self-titled 1985 debut album.

McAuley would form GMT with former Operator band mates Phil Taylor and Chris Glen who released the One by One EP, consisting of four unreleased Grand Prix songs, in 1986. It was re-issued as War Games in 1991. McAuley was then recruited by German producer/songwriter Frank Farian for his all-star project Far Corporation who landed a UK Top 10 hit with a re-make of Led Zeppelin's "Stairway to Heaven" in October 1985. In 1987, a cover of the unreleased Grand Prix song, "One By One", with McAuley on lead vocals, was released as the advance single to a second Far Corporation album, titled Advantage, but the completed album was ultimately scrapped. By which time McAuley had already teamed up with guitar virtuoso Michael Schenker to form the McAuley Schenker Group who recorded three studio albums between 1987 and 1992. McAuley would go on to front the band Survivor between 2006 and 2011 when he was replaced by his predecessor, Jimi Jamison. McAuley re-teamed with Schenker live in 2012 and is one of the vocalists to appear on the Michael Schenker Fest albums Resurrection (2018) and Revelation (2019). McAuley's latest project is Black Swan with Jeff Pilson and Reb Beach whose debut album, Shake The World, was released in early 2020.

== Discography ==
- Grand Prix (1980)
- There for None to See (1982)
- Samurai (1983)
