= "Unplugged" Live =

Live album by McAuley Schenker Group
- Released: October 1992
- Recorded: 25 March 1992
- Venues: The Celebrity Theatre, Anaheim, California
- Genres: Rock, acoustic, instrumental
- Length: 50:30
- Labels: Impact (US); EMI (Europe and Japan)
- Producers: Robin McAuley and Michael Schenker

McAuley Schenker Group chronology
Nightmare: The Acoustic M.S.G. (1992)	"Unplugged" Live (1992)

Michael Schenker chronology
Nightmare: The Acoustic M.S.G. (1992)	"Unplugged" Live (1992)	Thank You (1993)

Professional ratings
Review scores
Source	Rating
AllMusic	2/5 stars
Collector's Guide to Heavy Metal	4/10

"Unplugged" Live is a live album by the McAuley Schenker Group, recorded in California, during a tour with a completely acoustic set. Michael Schenker released this live album at the height of "unplugged" mania in the early 1990s, revising his blistering guitar antics as reflective, nylon-string, semi-classical ballads. The album features Shark Island guitarist Spencer Sercombe on second guitar and backing vocals. "Unplugged" Live is the final release of the McAuley Schenker Group, which disbanded in 1993; Robin McAuley got married and retired from the music scene for a few years, while Michael Schenker began working on instrumental solo projects.

== Track listing ==
No.	Title	Writer(s)	Length
1.	"Anytime"	Robin McAuley, Steve Mann	5:42
2.	"We Believe in Love"	Michael Schenker, McAuley	6:06
3.	"What Happens to Me"	Schenker, McAuley	4:54
4.	"Bad Boys"	Schenker, McAuley	4:01
5.	"Gimme Your Love"	McAuley, Rocky Newton	3:59
6.	"Natural Thing"	Schenker, Phil Mogg	4:55
7.	"Perrier - formerly Courvoiser Concert"	Schenker, Gary Barden	1:53
8.	"When I'm Gone"	McAuley, Jesse Harms	4:52
9.	"Nightmare"	Schenker, McAuley	4:44
10.	"Doctor Doctor"	Schenker, Mogg	4:27
11.	"Lights Out"	Schenker, Mogg, Andy Parker, Pete Way	5:21
Total length:			50:30

Japanese bonus tracks

No.	Title	Writer(s)	Length
12.	"Paradise"	Schenker, McAuley	4:24
13.	"Only You Can Rock Me"	Way, Schenker, Mogg	4:25

== Personnel ==
- Robin McAuley – vocals, tambourine
- Michael Schenker – lead and rhythm guitars
- Spencer Sercombe – 12 string and 6 string rhythm guitars, background vocals, second part of lead break on "Gimme Your Love"

== Production ==
- Robin McAuley and Michael Schenker – producers
- Recorded at: Anaheim, California March 25, 1992
- Mixed by: Bill Dooley at Brooklyn Recording Studios in Los Angeles
