= Live on Earth (UFO album) =

Live album by UFO
- Released: September 2003
- Recorded: Rockpalast, Vienna, Austria on 29 January 1998
- Genre: Hard rock, heavy metal
- Label: Zoom Club Records
- Producer: UFO

UFO chronology
Sharks (2002)	Live on Earth (2003)	You Are Here (2004)

Michael Schenker chronology
Arachnophobiac (2003)	Live on Earth (2003)	Thank You 4 (2003)

Live on Earth is a live recording (double CD) of the band UFO. It was recorded in Vienna, Austria in 1998 and features four-fifths of the reformed, classic line up of the band from the late 1970s with Simon Wright replacing Andy Parker on drums who had decided to run his family business rather than tour.

Most of the set list is culled from their legendary live album Strangers in the Night with the inclusion of three songs from their last studio album Walk on Water and two older songs: "Electric Phase" and "One More for the Rodeo". The set list is identical to an earlier live album Werewolves of London except that Live on Earth includes "Shoot Shoot" as the final track.

Tha album was issued also as a quadruple CD set, including performances at the Agora Ballroom in Cleveland, in July 1977 and at Bogart's in Cincinnati, on 21 August 1995.

== Track listing ==
=== Disc 1 ===
1. "Natural Thing" (Michael Schenker, Phil Mogg, Pete Way)
2. "Mother Mary" (Schenker, Mogg, Way, Andy Parker)
3. "A Self Made Man" (Schenker, Mogg)
4. "Electric Phase" (Schenker, Mogg, Way)
5. "This Kid's" (Schenker, Mogg)
6. "Out in the Street" (Way, Mogg)
7. "One More for the Rodeo" (Mogg, Raymond)
8. "Venus" (Schenker, Mogg)
9. "Pushed to the Limit" (Schenker, Mogg)

=== Disc 2 ===
1. "Love to Love" (Schenker, Mogg)
2. "Too Hot to Handle" (Way, Mogg)
3. "Only You Can Rock Me" (Schenker, Mogg)
4. "Lights Out" (Schenker, Mogg, Parker, Way)
5. "Doctor Doctor" (Schenker, Mogg)
6. "Rock Bottom" (Schenker, Mogg)
7. "Shoot Shoot" (Schenker, Mogg, Way, Parker)

=== Disc 3 (4CD set, live in Cleveland, 1977) ===
1. "Lights Out"
2. "Gettin' Ready"
3. "Love to Love"
4. "On with the Action"
5. "Doctor Doctor"
6. "Out in the Streets"
7. "This Kid's"
8. "Shoot Shoot"
9. "Rock Bottom"
10. "Too Hot to Handle"

=== Disc 4 (4CD set, live in Cincinnati, 1995) ===
1. "Natural Thing"
2. "Mother Mary"
3. "Let It Roll"
4. "This Kid's"
5. "Out in the Streets"
6. "Venus"
7. "Pushed to the Limits"
8. "Love to Love"
9. "Only You Can Rock Me"
10. "Too Hot to Handle"
11. "Lights Out"
12. "Doctor Doctor"
13. "Rock Bottom"
14. "Shoot Shoot"
15. "C'mon Everybody"

== Personnel ==
- Phil Mogg – vocals
- Michael Schenker – lead guitar
- Paul Raymond – keyboards, guitar
- Pete Way – bass
- Simon Wright – drums on discs 1 and 2
- Andy Parker – drums on discs 3 and 4
