= Carole Davis =

English-American actress

- Born: Carole Raphaelle Davis; London, England
- Occupations: Actress; model; singer; writer
- Years active: 1978–present
- Spouse: Kevin Rooney

Carole Raphaelle Davis is an English-American actress, model, singer, and writer.

== Career ==
=== Acting ===
In 1978, Davis posed for Playboy. In 1980, she posed for Penthouse magazine under the name Tamara Kapitas, becoming Penthouse Pet of the Month in January 1980 and a runner-up for Pet of the Year in 1981.

As an actress, Davis' first feature film was in James Cameron's horror film Piranha II: The Spawning (1982). Later in the 1980s, she appeared in the comedy film The Flamingo Kid (1984). Her best known film role came as Roxie Shield, the vengeful ex-girlfriend in Mannequin (1987), a film that was widely panned by critics but later became a cult classic. She later also appeared in films such as the comedy The Shrimp on the Barbie (1990), the comedy If Looks Could Kill (1991), and The Rapture (1991).

She has made guest appearances on television series such as The A-Team, Star Trek: Voyager, Sex and the City, Angel and more recently in 2 Broke Girls and Madam Secretary.

=== Music ===
In 1989, Davis' signed with Warner Bros. Records and released her first album Heart of Gold, which was produced by Nile Rodgers. Her single "Serious Money" (a cover of The O'Jays hit "For the Love of Money") was a dance hit and the video was number one and became the original theme song to the hip hop music video show Rap City on BET. The song's success enabled Davis to tour Europe and Asia and perform in clubs throughout the United States.

As a songwriter, Davis signed a publishing deal with MCA. In Europe, she signed on with Sony France. Davis met Prince in the 1980s and the two developed a friendship, culminating in Davis co-writing Prince's single "Slow Love" for his Grammy Award-nominated album Sign o' the Times. She recorded her own version of the song for Warner Bros. Records but subsequently left the label in 1993 and moved to Atlantic Records, where she self-produced and wrote the album I'm No Angel.

=== Writing ===
Davis has written a series of articles on anti-Semitism in Europe for The Jewish Journal. As a novelist, she is the author of The Diary of Jinky, Dog of a Hollywood Wife, a non-fiction humour book about Hollywood excess and human status anxiety written from the point of view of a death row dog. Her screenplay "Amnesia of the Heart" was set up at DreamWorks. She has been a contributor for several animal welfare publications including American Dog Magazine, for whom she also worked as an investigative journalist. She had an animal welfare column on Newsvine and ran her own blog Hollywood Dog through Blogspot.

She is the West Coast Director of the Companion Animal Protection Society, a national non-profit organisation that investigates puppy mills and pet stores.

== Selected filmography ==
=== Film ===
Year	Title	Role	Notes
1981	C.O.D.	Contessa Bazzini	
1981	Piranha II: The Spawning	Jai	
1983	The First Turn-On!	Art Teacher	Uncredited
1984	The Flamingo Kid	Joyce Brody	Credited as Carole R. Davis
1987	Mannequin	Roxie Shield	
1987	The Princess Academy	Sonia	
1990	The Shrimp on the Barbie	Dominique	
1991	If Looks Could Kill	Areola Canasta	
1997	Interruptions	Sherrie, the sister	
2010	Going the Distance	Carmen	Credited as Carole Raphaelle Davis

=== Television ===
Year	Title	Role	Notes
1984	The A-Team	Kalani	Episode: "The Island"
1996	3rd Rock from the Sun	Aviana	Episode: "Lonely Dick"
1996	Star Trek: Voyager	Giuseppina Pentangeli	Episode: "The Swarm"; Credited as Carole Raphaelle Davis
1998	Sex and the City	Amalita Amalfi	Episode: "The Power of Female Sex"
2002	Live from Baghdad	Mrs. Awatiff	HBO TV Movie; Credited as Carole Raphaelle Davis
2004	Angel	Ilona Costa Bianchi	Episode: "The Girl in Question"; Credited as Carole Raphaelle Davis
2007	Veronica Mars	Sabirah Krimani	Episode: "Un-American Graffiti"; Credited as Carole Raphaelle Davis
2007	Scrubs	Rosie	Episode: "Their Story"; Credited as Carole Raphaelle Davis
2013	2 Broke Girls	Agnes	Episode: "And Just Plane Magic"; Credited as Carole Raphaelle Davis
2016–2017	Madam Secretary	French Foreign Minister Monique Beauvais	Episode: "Snap Back" & "Article 5"; Credited as Carole Raphaelle Davis
