= Mannequin (1987 film) =

1987 film by Michael Gottlieb

- Theatrical release poster
- Directed by: Michael Gottlieb
- Written by: Edward Rugoff; Michael Gottlieb
- Produced by: Art Levinson
- Starring: Andrew McCarthy; Kim Cattrall; Estelle Getty; G. W. Bailey
- Cinematography: Tim Suhrstedt
- Edited by: Richard Halsey; Frank Jimenez
- Music by: Sylvester Levay
- Production companies: Gladden Entertainment; 20th Century Fox
- Distributed by: 20th Century Fox
- Release date: February 13, 1987 (United States)
- Running time: 90 minutes
- Country: United States
- Language: English
- Budget: $7.9 million
- Box office: $42.7 million (US)

Mannequin is a 1987 American fantasy romantic comedy film directed by Michael Gottlieb in his directorial debut, and written by Edward Rugoff and Gottlieb. It stars Andrew McCarthy, Kim Cattrall, Estelle Getty, James Spader, Meshach Taylor and G. W. Bailey. The original music score was composed by Sylvester Levay. The film revolves around Jonathan Switcher, a passionate, chronically underemployed artist who lands a job as a department store window dresser, and the mannequin he created which becomes inhabited by the spirit of Emmy Hesire, a woman from Ancient Egypt, but only comes alive for Jonathan.

Mannequin received a nomination for an Academy Award for Best Original Song for its main title song, "Nothing's Gonna Stop Us Now" by Starship, which reached number one on both the Billboard Hot 100 and UK Singles Chart. Both early and later critical reception has been generally negative with common criticisms being made towards the ludicrous premise and the overly farcical and sentimental tone; however, audience responses have been comparatively more positive and in the years since its release, the film has developed a cult following. In 1991, a sequel called Mannequin Two: On the Move was released with none of the main cast except Taylor returning.

== Plot ==
In Ancient Egypt, Ema "Emmy" Hesire takes refuge in a pyramid, pleading with the gods to find true love rather than enter into an arranged marriage with a dung dealer. Emmy suddenly vanishes before her mother's eyes.

In 1987 Philadelphia, Jonathan Switcher is a sculptor working at a mannequin warehouse and finishes a single female mannequin he considers a masterpiece. His boss fires him for spending time trying to make his mannequins works of art. Jonathan takes a number of odd jobs but is fired each time for working too slowly because he tries to make each project artistic. His girlfriend, Roxie Shield, an employee of the Illustra department store, dumps him, calling him a flake.

After his motorcycle breaks down in the rain, Jonathan passes the Prince & Company department store, where he sees his mannequin in the display window. He remarks that she is the first work that made him feel like a true artist. The next morning, he saves store owner Claire Timkin from being injured by her own shop sign. Grateful, Claire orders the store manager, Mr. Richards (who is secretly paid by Illustra to sabotage Prince & Company so it can be bought), to give Jonathan a job. Viewed with suspicion by security guard Captain Felix Maxwell, Jonathan works with and befriends flamboyant window dresser Hollywood Montrose.

While Jonathan is putting together a window display, the mannequin he made comes to life through Emmy's spirit. She says she has existed for centuries as a muse, sometimes inhabiting the works of an artist she admires and inspires. She has encountered amazing people, but has never found true love. Emmy explains that the gods allow her life when she and Jonathan are unobserved.

With Emmy's help, Jonathan's window display is a massive success. Now in charge of visual merchandising, Jonathan asks Emmy to continue helping with the displays. Over several weeks, they create several popular displays, attracting new business while also deepening their relationship. Illustra's chief executive, B.J. Wert, sends Roxie to poach Jonathan, but he refuses, saying he works for people who value him. Annoyed by Felix's ineptitude and Richard's attitude toward Jonathan, Claire fires them and makes Jonathan the store's vice president.

One night, Jonathan takes Emmy through the city on his motorcycle, confusing many bystanders. Chased by Richard and Felix, Jonathan and Emmy escape and continue their ride through the city. They embrace each other on a dock and make love back in the store. Jonathan tells her that people need works of art and that they could bring that to the world together. He professes his love for Emmy before going to sleep, and Emmy professes the same for him before returning to the window.

Richards and Felix break into Prince & Company and steal the female mannequins. The next morning, Jonathan confronts Wert about the theft, who makes another job offer. Furious over Jonathan caring so much about the mannequin he calls Emmy, Roxie storms off. Jonathan follows Roxie as Felix pursues them. Roxie loads the stolen mannequins into the store's large trash compactor, then is knocked out by debris. As Hollywood holds the pursuers at bay with a fire hose, Jonathan jumps onto the compactor's conveyor belt to save Emmy. As Jonathan has proven his true love for her, Emmy comes to life permanently.

Felix and his fellow guards rush in, followed by Wert and Richards, who demand that the police arrest Jonathan. Claire arrives, revealing she has security video of Richards and Felix breaking and entering and committing theft. Wert fires Roxie as he is arrested and hauled away alongside Richards and Felix. Jonathan realizes the security footage may have shown him being romantic with a mannequin, but Claire coyly suggests he shouldn't worry about it. Some time later, Jonathan and Emmy are married in the store window of Prince & Company, with Claire as maid of honor and Hollywood as best man. Numerous pedestrians outside the store window applaud the wedding.

== Cast ==
- Andrew McCarthy as Jonathan Switcher
- Kim Cattrall as Ema "Emmy" Hesire
- Estelle Getty as Claire Timkin
- James Spader as Mr. Richards
- G. W. Bailey as Captain Felix Maxwell
- Meshach Taylor as Hollywood Montrose
- Carole Davis as Roxie Shield
- Steve Vinovich as B.J. Wert
- Christopher Maher as Armand
- Phyllis Newman as Emmy's Mother
- Phil Rubenstein as Mannequin Factory Boss
- Andrew Hill Newman as Andy Ackerman (Credited: as Compactor Room Janitor)

== Production ==
=== Development ===
The idea for the film came when director Michael Gottlieb was walking down Fifth Avenue and thought he saw a mannequin move in the window of Bergdorf Goodman. Others observe the similarities to the plot of the film One Touch of Venus (1948). The film was made based on the marketing principles of noted Hollywood market researcher Joseph Farrell, who served as an executive producer. The film was specifically designed to appeal to target demographics. Though not a star, Andrew McCarthy was cast after tests of his films showed that he strongly appealed to girls, the target audience.

=== Filming ===
The producers contacted various state film commissions across America looking for an elegant center city department store in which to shoot the movie. They visited stores across the country before settling on the flagship Wanamaker's store in Philadelphia. The store was given the name Prince & Company for the film. Interior filming at Wanamaker's took about three weeks, with shooting usually beginning around 9 pm and going until 6 am the next day. Andrew McCarthy can be seen playing on the Wanamaker Organ in one music-backed scene early in the film.

Additional scenes were filmed in the formal gardens behind The Hotel Hershey. Scenes taking place at the fictitious department store Illustra were filmed at the Boscov's department store in the former Camp Hill Mall (now Camp Hill Shopping Center) near Harrisburg, Pennsylvania. Philadelphia mayor Wilson Goode estimated the film injected $3 million into the city.

Prior to the start of filming, Kim Cattrall spent six weeks posing for Santa Monica sculptor, Tanya Wolf Ragir, who captured her likeness. Six mannequins, each with a different expression, were made. Cattrall recalled, "There's no way to play a mannequin except if you want to sit there as a dummy [...] I did a lot of body-building because I wanted to be as streamlined as possible. I wanted to match the mannequins as closely as I could." The actress also said that doing the film made her feel "grown up":

I've become more of a leading lady instead of, like, the girl... All the other movies that I've done I played the girl, and the plot was around the guy. I've never had anybody to do special lighting for me, or find out what clothes look good on me, or what camera angles are best for me... In this movie, I learned a lot from it. It's almost like learning old Hollywood techniques... I've always been sort of a tomboy. I feel great being a girl, wearing a dress.

=== Music ===
Featured in the film, "Nothing's Gonna Stop Us Now" was co-written by Albert Hammond and Diane Warren and recorded by the American rock band Starship in 1986. It is a duet featuring Starship vocalists Grace Slick and Mickey Thomas. It reached number one on the Billboard Hot 100 on April 4, 1987, and topped the UK Singles Chart for four weeks the following month, becoming the UK's second-biggest-selling single of 1987.

Mannequin Soundtrack (by Sylvester Levay) 00. Twentieth Century Fox (00:13):

- Prologue (02:02)
- In My Wildest Dreams (complete studio) (04:24)
- My Girl (02:46)
- Making Balloons (02:13)
- Jonathan's Theme (02:08)
- Looking For A Job (00:46)
- I Have Just The Job For You (00:12)
- The Mannequin (00:53)
- Roll Over Bill Shakespeare (00:36)
- Identify Yourself (00:49)
- Don't You Like Your New Scarf (00:03)
- You Like To Work With Your Hands (00:06)
- Emmy's Theme (00:51)
- First Window (00:33)
- Store Front (01:32)
- We Have Got Ourselves a Mission (00:18)
- Temporary Insanity (00:03)
- Chris, Who's Chris (00:41)
- Do You Dream About Me (03:48)
- Just When I Think You're Real (00:06)
- Talk To Them (00:10)
- Oh Yes Hot Smoking (00:27)
- Flambe Terrorist (violin background) (01:50)
- Comon' Rambo (00:07)
- Full Filled Stay In The Caribbean (00:39)
- Get A Picture (00:58)
- You're Gonna Pay For That (background) (01:20)
- Department Store Fight (00:50)
- That'll Teach Em (00:15)
- Hang Gliding (01:19)
- We'll Never Dress The Mannequins In Time (00:28)
- Movin’ On Up (01:03)
- You Can't Worry What Will Happen To Us (Jonanthan's Theme 2) (00:21)
- You Personally Vouch For This Guy (00:17)
- Put Your Arms Around Me (Emmy's Theme 2) (01:00)
- Shoe Polish On My Face (00:06)
- Expert At Surveillance (01:45)
- Harley Ride (01:02)
- It's Breath Taking (Jonathan's Theme 3) (01:25)
- I'm In The Hands Of A Vegetable (01:55)
- Saving Emmy (00:33)
- You're Never Gonna See Her Again (05:47)
- I Always Have, I Always Will (Jonathan's Theme 4) (00:32)
- Nothing's Gonna Stop Us Now (End Credits) (04:36)

== Reception ==
=== Box office ===
The film debuted at number three at the US box office behind Platoon and Outrageous Fortune, grossing $6 million over the four-day President's Day weekend, surpassing the other opener, Over the Top starring Sylvester Stallone. To date, the film has grossed a total of $42.7 million in the United States and Canada.

=== Critical response ===
On Rotten Tomatoes, the film has an approval rating of 20% based on 40 reviews and an average rating of 3.9/10. The site's consensus states: "Mannequin is a real dummy, outfitted with a ludicrous concept and a painfully earnest script that never springs to life, despite the best efforts of an impossibly charming Kim Cattrall." On Metacritic, the film has a score of 21 out of 100 based on reviews from 13 critics, indicating "generally unfavorable reviews". Audiences surveyed by CinemaScore gave the film a grade B+ on scale of A to F. It was savaged by Leonard Maltin, who called it "absolute rock-bottom fare, dispiriting for anyone who remembers what movie comedy should be". In his print review, Roger Ebert awarded it a half star and wrote, "A lot of bad movies are fairly throbbing with life. Mannequin is dead. The wake lasts 1 1/2 hours, and then we can leave the theater."

Rita Kempley of The Washington Post called the film "made by, for, and about dummies". Janet Maslin of The New York Times puts the blame on the writer-director: "as co-written and directed by Michael Gottlieb, Mannequin is a state-of-the-art showcase of perfunctory technique". Dan McQuade, writing in Philadelphia Magazine, referencing the film's use of Philadelphia as a setting, panned the film and wrote, "The message of Mannequin, clumsy as it is, is that the greatest place and time in recorded history is 1980s Philadelphia... Truly, this is the most uplifting film ever made about the city."

David Cornelius of DVD Talk wrote: "Mannequin is one of the stupidest movies ever conceived, and one of the worst. Which makes it, in its own lousy way, mesmerizing. To watch it is to get sucked in by its hypnotic ways; its very off-the-wall shoddiness is astounding. Spader alone is worth the price of admission – surely aware of the movie's badness, the actor hams it up with a deliriously over-the-top performance." He called it "a Bad Movie Essential" but warned viewers with a lower pain threshold for bad films to "obviously skip it as it is a dreadful film".

Though initially poorly received, Mannequin has been cited as a romantic comedy cult classic and has managed to garner an ardent and strong cult following; its fans have praised the film's sets, costumes, supporting cast, script, and the romantic chemistry between lead actors McCarthy and Cattrall. The film is considered one of the many popular comedy films from the golden age of 1980s Brat Pack films because it features actors Spader, Cattrall, and McCarthy who all starred in other movies of that era. Retrospective reviews have also commended the provocative and progressive portrayal of Hollywood Montrose (Meshach Taylor) for being an unashamedly positive homosexual character who befriends the main character and manages to be heroic in the finale.

=== Accolades ===
Award	Category	Recipients	Result
Academy Awards	Best Original Song	"Nothing's Gonna Stop Us Now"; Music and Lyrics by Albert Hammond and Diane Warren	Nominated
ASCAP Film and Television Music Awards	Most Performed Songs from Motion Pictures	"Nothing's Gonna Stop Us Now"; Music and Lyrics by Albert Hammond and Diane Warren	Won
Fantafestival	Best Film	Michael Gottlieb	Won
Fantafestival	Best Director	Michael Gottlieb	Won
Fantafestival	Best Actor	Andrew McCarthy	Won
Fantasporto	Best Film	Michael Gottlieb	Nominated
Fantasporto	Best Screenplay	Michael Gottlieb	Won
Golden Globe Awards	Best Original Song	"Nothing's Gonna Stop Us Now"; Music and Lyrics by Albert Hammond and Diane Warren	Nominated
Grammy Awards	Best Song Written Specifically for a Motion Picture or Television	"Nothing's Gonna Stop Us Now"; Music and Lyrics by Albert Hammond and Diane Warren	Nominated

== Home media ==
Mannequin was released on VHS, Betamax and digital stereo LaserDisc format in September 1987 by Cannon Films through Media Home Entertainment. The film was released on DVD by MGM Home Entertainment on October 7, 2004, in a widescreen Region 1 DVD, and was later re-released to DVD on January 16, 2008, in a new double feature edition with Mannequin Two: On the Move as the second disc. Mannequin was released on Blu-ray for the first time by Olive Films (under license from MGM) on November 3, 2015.

== Sequels and legacy ==
In 1991, a sequel called Mannequin Two: On the Move was released and was directed by Stewart Raffill. It was nowhere near as profitable, grossing under $4 million, and was dubbed as "one of the worst follow-ups ever made". In 2010, Gladden Entertainment executives were said to be in the "early development" stage of the remake, envisioning a plot of the man crushing on a "laser display hologram" as opposed to a mannequin. However, no further details were made public about its development. An original mannequin prop was located by Philadelphia brand South Fellini in 2019 and has been placed on display in the company's boutique. The film was also parodied by James Corden and Victoria Beckham in 2017 on The Late Late Show with James Corden as a precursor to a Carpool Karaoke segment.
