= Tanya Ragir =

American contemporary sculptor (born 1955)

Tanya Wolf Ragir (1955 - December 29, 2023) was an American contemporary sculptor, born in Los Angeles. She is best known for her sculptures centered on the nude feminine figure, sensually juxtaposing the feminine landscape with geometric forms. She sculpted in clay, the pieces being later fired or cast in bronze, aluminum, stainless steel and resin.

== Career ==
Ragir received a bachelor's degree in Sculpture and Dance from the University of California, Santa Cruz in 1976. After creating fully three-dimensional pieces for many years, her later work was rich in shallow wall sculptures. Ragir's works have been featured in several motion pictures; most notably in Meet the Fockers (2004) and in Mannequin (1987). She was an elected member of the National Sculpture Society and also a member of the International Sculpture Center, and the Southern California Women's Caucus for Art. Among many honors, Ragir received a Certificate of Excellence in Sculpture in the California Art Club 101ST Annual Gold Medal Awards (2014).

== Death ==
Ragir died on December 29, 2023.

== Exhibitions ==
=== Permanent ===
Some of Tanya Ragir's sculptures are permanently exhibited in public places including:

- Avalon´s Legacy, Moment In Time (Boys), Moment In Time (Girls) and Legacy (bronze sculptures): in Brea, California
- Harmony (bronze, copper and steel) at Oakbrook Center in Chicago
- Air (bronze): in Rose Art Museum at Brandeis University, Waltham, Massachusetts
- Totem (resin): at Cerro Coso Community College in Ridgecrest, California
- Mother and Child and Legacy (bronze sculptures): at Jewish Home for the Aging in Reseda, California

=== Temporary exhibitions ===
Ragir's work has been extensively exhibited for over 25 years very many galleries and museums across the US and abroad.

- 2016 (Feb-Mar 3) Sculpture MAZE, bG Gallery Bergamot Station
- 2016 (Jan 29–31) Fabrikexpo, Los Angeles, CA
- 2015 - 2016 (Dec 11-Jan 8), California Regional Showcase at Manifest Gallery
- 2015 (Sep 3-30) Tanya Ragir:The Warrior Series, Gloria Delson Contemporary Arts, Los Angeles
- 2014 (whole year) Grand Rapids Art Museum
- 2013 (Jun 2-23) California Art Club, 102nd Annual Gold Medal Juried Exhibition
- 2012 (Sep 13–30) Gallery É, Tanya-Ragir-and-Sasha-vom-Dorp Exhibition, Los Angeles
