= The Shrimp on the Barbie =

1990 film by Alan Smithee

- DVD cover
- Directed by: Michael Gottlieb (Note: Credited as Alan Smithee.)
- Written by: Grant Morris; Ron House; Alan Shearman
- Produced by: R. Ben Efraim
- Starring: Cheech Marin; Emma Samms; Vernon Wells; Bruce Spence; Carole Davis
- Cinematography: James Bartle
- Edited by: Fred A. Chulack
- Music by: Peter D. Kaye
- Distributed by: Unity Pictures
- Release date: 31 August 1990
- Running time: 87 minutes
- Countries: New Zealand; United States
- Language: English
- Budget: $5.5 million
- Box office: $458,996 (USA)

The Shrimp on the Barbie, released in Australia as The Boyfriend from Hell, is a 1990 comedy film directed by Michael Gottlieb (under the pseudonym Alan Smithee) and starring Cheech Marin. The title is derived from a line in a 1980s series of popular ads starring Paul Hogan promoting tourism to Australia: "I'll slip an extra shrimp on the barbie for you". The film was a box office disaster, grossing only 1/10th of its budget.

== Plot ==
Australian heiress Alexandra Hobart's father has disapproved of every boyfriend she has brought home to meet him, including her burly, life-of-the-party fiancé, Bruce. After a disastrous birthday party, Alexandra decides to challenge her father with the worst boyfriend she can find. She hires a down-on-his luck waiter from a Mexican restaurant in Sydney, Australia, named Carlos to masquerade as her new boyfriend to persuade her father into allowing her to marry Bruce. Needing the money to save the failing restaurant, Carlos agrees to the ruse; acting loud, belligerent and obnoxious, shocking everyone in the Hobart household and their high-society friends at a party with his crude behavior, warranting unwanted attention from Alex's eccentric cousin, Maggie in the process.

After a while however Alex discovers that in spite of his rather crass and unrefined ways Carlos is actually a very caring and sensitive person and she even finds herself falling for him and starts to see Bruce for the narcissistic fortune hunter he really is. Alex's father, however, doesn't buy the act, and hires a detective to photograph Bruce and Alex's best friend, Dominique in a compromising position. Carlos gets wind of the infidelity and, attempting to save Alexandra from being hurt, ends up assaulted by Bruce. Alex outs Bruce and Dominique at a party before racing to the airport to mend fences with Carlos. Hoping she's not too late, the plane called back to the airport by her father. Realizing how noble Carlos is, Mr Hobart invests in Carlos' restaurant thereby saving it from closing.

== Cast ==
- Cheech Marin ... Carlos Múñoz
- Emma Samms ... Alexandra "Alex" Hobart
- Vernon Wells ... Bruce Woodley, Alex's boyfriend and fiancé
- Bruce Spence ... Wayne, owner of the Mañana Restaurant
- Carole Davis ... Dominique, Alex's best friend
- Terence Cooper ... Sir Ian Hobart, Alex's father
- Jeanette Cronin ... Maggie Ridley, Alex's cousin
- Gary McCormick ... Gary Williams, restaurant critic
- Frank Whitten ... Blue
- June Bishop ... Lady Irene Hobart, Alex's mother
- David Argue ... Kevin, Carlos' house mate
- Bruce Allpress ... Mr. Ridley, Maggie's father
- Val Lamond ... Mrs. Ridley
- Richard Hanna ... Nigel, Alex's tennis partner
- Noel Appleby ... Slim, Mañana chef
- Eric Liddy ... Edison, the Hobart's butler
- Kim Buchanan ... Eve Tracey
- Joel Tobeck ... Lance, bar patron
- Jonathan Coleman ... Postman
