= If Looks Could Kill (film) =

1991 film by William Dear

- Theatrical release poster
- Directed by: William Dear
- Screenplay by: Darren Star
- Story by: Fred Dekker
- Produced by: Craig Zadan; Neil Meron
- Starring: Richard Grieco; Linda Hunt; Roger Rees; Robin Bartlett; Gabrielle Anwar
- Cinematography: Douglas Milsome
- Edited by: John F. Link
- Music by: David Foster
- Production company: Northwest Productions
- Distributed by: Warner Bros.
- Release date: March 15, 1991
- Running time: 88 minutes
- Country: United States
- Language: English
- Budget: $12 million
- Box office: $7.7 million

If Looks Could Kill is a 1991 American action comedy film directed by William Dear from a screenplay by Darren Star and a story by Fred Dekker. It stars Richard Grieco as a high school student who is mistaken for an agent and people try to kill him. It also stars Linda Hunt, Roger Rees, Robin Bartlett, and Gabrielle Anwar.

The film was theatrically released in the United States on March 15, 1991, by Warner Bros. It received mixed reviews from critics and was a box-office bomb, grossing only $7.7 million against a $12 million budget. It garnered three Saturn Award nominations: Best Fantasy Film, Best Director for Dear, and Best Supporting Actress for Bartlett.

== Plot ==
Eighteen-year-old Michael Corben of Detroit, Michigan, is a handsome underachiever slacker. Rather than attending his high school French class, he spends all of his time drinking and partying, until graduation arrives, when all of his debauchery catches up to him and he learns that he cannot graduate without a French credit. He has only one more chance to obtain the credit: the French teacher, Mrs. Grober, and the French Club are headed to France for summer school, and Michael must accompany them and participate if he wants to graduate that year.

However, at the airport, a CIA agent also named Michael Corben, who is on his way to France as well, is killed by the assassin Ilsa Grunt, henchwoman and surrogate mother of the villainous Augustus Steranko who seeks to steal all of the gold in Europe and use it to mint his own coins under the guise of a common currency. Because important details about the agent's identity (including his actual age) have been kept meticulously secret, Michael is mistaken for the CIA agent. He is inexplicably boarded first class on his flight to Paris, and upon arrival is whisked away by British Intelligence.

The late Agent Corben's mission had been to protect Augustus Steranko, who (being not suspected to be evil) has been murdering European finance ministers as part of his plan. After some efforts to explain that he is not the Corben they think he is, Michael agrees to play along once it becomes apparent that he will be allowed to utilize high-tech gadgets, including X-ray glasses, exploding chewing gum and LA Gear sneakers with suction cups, as well as a Lotus Esprit. At first, he enjoys the perks of being a spy, but begins to rethink his decision once his life gets endangered by Steranko's deadly assassins, including Zigesfeld, a henchman with a prosthetic gold hand, and Areola Canasta, who kills her victims using her venomous pet scorpion.

In the meantime, Steranko captures Michael's teacher and classmates and holds them all hostage at his remote castle stronghold. Michael teams up with a girl his own age named Mariska—the daughter of Agent Blade, who was murdered by Steranko and his gang—to bring the villains down and save his friends as well as all of Europe's gold. Despite being briefly captured and imprisoned by Steranko's men, Michael escapes, rescues Mrs. Grober and his friends, and battles and defeats Zigesfeld.

Steranko, his duplicitous nature exposed by Michael, kidnaps Mariska and attempts to escape with his gold in his Eurocopter Ecureuil helicopter. Michael manages to rescue Mariska, and Steranko is subsequently killed when he falls out of the helicopter, and it and the onboard gold supply both drop on him. Afterwards, Mrs. Grober agrees to give Michael the French credit that he needs.

== Cast ==
- Richard Grieco as Michael Corben
- Linda Hunt as Ilsa Grunt
- Roger Rees as Augustus Steranko
- Robin Bartlett as Patricia Grober
- Gabrielle Anwar as Mariska Blade
- Geraldine James as Vendetta Galante
- Michael Siberry as Derek Richardson
- Tom Rack as Zigesfeld
- Carole Davis as Areola Canasta
- Frederick Coffin as Lieutenant Colonel Larabee
- Roger Daltrey as Blade
- Oliver Dear as Kent
- Cynthia Preston as Melissa Tyler
- Michael Sinelnikoff as Haywood
- Travis Swords as Kelly
- Gerry Mendicino as Herb Corben
- Fiona Reid as Marge Corben
- Michael Vinokur as Brad Corben
- David McIlwraith as Agent Michael Corben
- Gene Mack as Agent Kramer
- Jacques Tourangeau as Jacques Lefevre
- Gordon Masten as Ludwig Krupp
- Travis Swords as Kelly

== Production ==
The film was originally written by Fred Dekker as Teen Agent, the premise of which was to place a character akin to Anthony Michael Hall's characters from John Hughes' films into a James Bond type movie. The film was scheduled to begin production in 1986 until a change in management at TriStar Pictures saw the project go into turnaround. By 1989, it was reported that Warner Bros. Pictures had acquired the project which had been retitled from Teen Agent to Nothing But Trouble as the producers hoped this would play beyond the appeal of a teen film to both teens and their parents (though the Teen Agent name would be used for European releases of the film). Ultimately, the film would be released under the title If Looks Could Kill. The film marked the first major role for Richard Grieco who had come to prominence in the TV series 21 Jump Street.

Dekker, who was only credited for the story in the released film, later stated that "The final product is not at all what I envisioned, not the least reason being they cast a 'cool' guy to play the nerdy lead, which kind of defeats the comedy."

Principal photography began on April 16, 1990, and wrapped on July 4, 1990. The film was shot at various locations in Montreal and La Malbaie, Quebec, Canada.

== Soundtrack ==
If Looks Could Kill

Soundtrack album by various artists
- Released: March 15, 1991
- Recorded: 1990
- Label: MCA Records

1. "If Looks Could Kill (No Turning Back)" – Glenn Medeiros
2. "One Hot Country" – The Outfield
3. "Loud Guitars, Fast Cars and Wild, Wild Livin'" – Contraband
4. "One Mo' Time" – Trixter
5. "Better the Devil You Know" – Kylie Minogue
6. "Teach Me How to Dream" – Robin McAuley
7. "All Is Fair" – The Fixx
8. "Maybe This Time" – The Stabilizers
9. "My Saltine" – Bang Tango
10. "Michael Corben's Adventure" – David Foster and Bill Ross

== Reception ==
=== Box office ===
If Looks Could Kill made $2.2 million from 838 screens in its opening weekend, finishing 11th at the box office. The film ultimately grossed over $7.7 million in North America.

=== Critical response ===
On the review aggregator website Rotten Tomatoes, 29% of 7 critics' reviews are positive, with an average rating of 3.5/10.

Stephen Holden of The New York Times stated, "The film's fatal flaw is the charmless performance of its star, who displays so little enthusiasm that in looking for signs of life […]. Mr. Grieco's problems can be blamed partly on the director, William Dear, who plunks him into some potentially funny situations but then leaves him stranded without a clue as to how to proceed." Michael Wilmington of the Los Angeles Times opined, "Dear has a big, bright, bumptious style. He keeps the action lucid, the scenes popping. But If Looks Could Kill is a big, expensive cul-de-sac for him and everyone else: slick, quick, empty. It's another trailer-movie."

Roger Ebert of Chicago Sun-Times gave the film 3 out of 4 stars; while he initially thought it a bad film, he eventually decided its over-the-top goofiness was intentional and saw it as a subversion of the spy film formula, rather than an incompetent ripoff. Variety's review wrote that it "spoofs the James Bond formula in tiresome fashion". Rita Kempley of The Washington Post called it "insipid, tiresome and full of gross kids". She also criticized the violence, which she said was disturbing in a film marketed to the youth demographic.

=== Accolades ===
Year	Award	Category	Nominee	Result
1992	18th Saturn Awards	Best Fantasy Film	If Looks Could Kill	Nominated
1992	18th Saturn Awards	Best Director	William Dear	Nominated
1992	18th Saturn Awards	Best Supporting Actress	Robin Bartlett	Nominated
