= The Unforgiven World Tour =

Live album by Michael Schenker Group
- Released: 8 September 1999
- Recorded: The Edge, Palo Alto, California, May 1999
- Genre: Hard rock, heavy metal
- Length: 105:55
- Label: SPV/Steamhammer
- Producer: Michael Schenker and Mike Varney

Michael Schenker Group chronology
The Unforgiven (1999)	The Unforgiven World Tour (1999)	Be Aware of Scorpions (2001)

Michael Schenker chronology
The Unforgiven (1999)	The Unforgiven World Tour (1999)	Adventures of the Imagination (2000)

Professional ratings
Review scores
Source	Rating
AllMusic	2.5/5 stars
Collector's Guide to Heavy Metal	7/10

The Unforgiven World Tour is a live album by the Michael Schenker Group, released in 1999.

This is a double-CD live album recorded during three performances in May, 1999 at The Edge, Palo Alto, California. The material dates from throughout Schenker's career, including selections by the Scorpions, UFO, Michael Schenker Group, and his own solo work.

== Track listing ==
=== Disc one ===
No.	Title	Writer(s)	Length
1.	"Armed and Ready"	Michael Schenker, Gary Barden	5:03
2.	"Only You Can Rock Me"	Schenker, Phil Mogg, Pete Way	4:01
3.	"Natural Thing"	Schenker, Mogg	3:21
4.	"Pushed to the Limit"	Schenker, Mogg	3:40
5.	"Written in the Sand"	Schenker, Leif Sundin	3:40
6.	"Captain Nemo"	Schenker	3:27
7.	"Into the Arena"	Schenker	6:07
8.	"Essence"	Schenker	5:00
9.	"Pilot of Your Soul"	Schenker, Kelly Keeling	4:53
10.	"The Mess I've Made"	Schenker, Keeling	4:30
11.	"Fat City"	Schenker, Keeling	4:30
12.	"On and On"	Schenker, Barden	4:51
13.	"Attack of the Mad Axeman"	Schenker, Barden	4:53
Total length:			58:05

=== Disc two ===
No.	Title	Writer(s)	Length
1.	"Assault Attack"	Schenker, Chris Glen, Graham Bonnet, Ted McKenna	4:24
2.	"Another Piece of Meat"	Rudolf Schenker, Herman Rarebell	3:57
3.	"Love to Love"	Schenker, Mogg	7:22
4.	"Too Hot to Handle"	Mogg, Way	3:54
5.	"Lights Out"	Schenker, Mogg, Way, Andy Parker	5:14
6.	"Bijou Pleasurette / Positive Forward"	Schenker	6:00
7.	"Doctor Doctor"	Schenker, Mogg	5:09
8.	"Rock Bottom"	Schenker, Mogg	11:45
Total length:			47:50

== Personnel ==
Band members

- Michael Schenker – lead guitar
- Keith Slack – vocals
- Kelly Keeling – vocals on tracks 9, 10, 11, 12, 13 of CD 1 and tracks 1, 2 of CD 2
- Wayne Findlay – rhythm guitar, keyboards
- Shane Gaalaas – drums, acoustic guitar on "Bijou Pleasurette"/"Positive Forward"
- Barry Sparks – bass

Production

- Michael Schenker and Mike Varney – producers
- Phil Edwards – engineer
- Ralph Patlan, Joe Marquez, Mike Varney – mixing
- Ralph Patlan, Tim Gennert – mastering
- Dave Stephens – graphic design
