= Amy Schugar =

Amy Schugar is an American songwriter, arranger, singer and guitarist.

Schugar performed on the Los Angeles, California metal scene during the metal days, with her band "Maiden America" that performed regularly at The Troubadour, Gazzarri's and the Whisky a Go Go clubs on the Sunset Strip. She also formed the hard rock group "Sass", which performed throughout the Phoenix, Arizona area.

While attending a concert by Eric Johnson, she met Michael Schenker, and they began their songwriting collaboration in early 2003. The duo recorded the album Under Construction, with Schenker's soulful guitar playing and Schugar singing. Schugar was a special guest with the Michael Schenker Group (MSG) on their Autumn/Winter 2003 tour, singing some of the Schugar/Schenker songs with MSG.

Since then, Schugar received endorsement deals with Daisy Rock Guitars, Floyd Rose Tremolo Systems, D'Addario Strings, Crate Amplifiers, Seymour Duncan, Fernandes Sustainers and Robert Keeley Electronics, and is written about in music trade magazines and internet webzines.
