= The Odd Trio =

Studio album by Michael Schenker
- Released: November 2000
- Genre: Instrumental rock
- Length: 44:21
- Label: Michael Schenker Records
- Producer: Michael Schenker

Michael Schenker chronology
Covenant (2000)	The Odd Trio (2000)	Dreams and Expressions (2001)

The Odd Trio is a solo album released in 2000 by guitar virtuoso Michael Schenker. Schenker himself talks about this album on his website: "This album came about in 2000 when I had the urge to record an album playing all instruments. I thought of it as a fun thing to do and decided to disguise myself as different musicians, inventing characters. It was quite an experience, engineering, producing and recording all instruments by myself in my own studio. Even my brother Rudolf did not recognized me as 'Kathy the drummer' and asked, who is this nice looking chick? Amazingly, this album became a favourite to many of my fans".

== Track listing ==
All songs composed by Michael Schenker.

1. "Far Beyond the Ocean" - 4:52
2. "Searching" - 4:13
3. "Rockin' and Lovin'" - 4:26
4. "Welcome" - 4:22
5. "The Good Old Days" - 4:38
6. "Watching" - 4:29
7. "In Good Faith" - 4:20
8. "Achievement" - 4:18
9. "Hangin' Out" - 4:45
10. "It's OK" - 3:58

== Personnel ==
- Michael Schenker - guitar
- Harry Cobham (Michael Schenker) - bass
- Kathy Brown (Michael Schenker) - drums
