= Save Yourself (McAuley Schenker Group album) =

Studio album by McAuley Schenker Group
- Released: October 10, 1989
- Recorded: 1989
- Studios: One on One Recording, Los Angeles, California, USA
- Genre: Melodic hard rock · heavy metal
- Length: 50:45
- Label: Capitol / EMI
- Producer: Frank Filipetti

McAuley Schenker Group chronology
Perfect Timing (1987)	Save Yourself (1989)	M.S.G. (1991)

Michael Schenker chronology
Perfect Timing (1987)	Save Yourself (1989)	Contraband (1991)

Singles from Save Yourself
- 1. "Anytime" Released: April 1990; 2. "Save Yourself" Released: 1990; 3. "This Is My Heart" Released: 1990

Save Yourself is the sixth full-length studio album recorded by the various M.S.G. lineups, and the second album credited specifically to McAuley Schenker Group. It was released in 1989 on Capitol Records. "Save Yourself", "Anytime" and "This Is My Heart" were all singles released from the record. The album peaked at No. 92 on Billboard 200 Album chart.

== Critical reception ==
Professional ratings
Review scores
Source	Rating
AllMusic	2/5 stars
Collector's Guide to Heavy Metal	5/10

Pan-European magazine Music & Media called album – "a truly commanding hard-rock record" with "its dramatic build-ups, solid hooks and electrifying guitars." Reviewer praised "inspired, urgent vocals" of Robin McAuley and "classy production" of Frank Filipetti, as well as Steve Mann performance and expressed a hope that their efforts "should give the band the international breakthrough they deserve."

== Track listing ==
1. "Save Yourself" (Robin McAuley, Michael Schenker) – 6:16
2. "Bad Boys" (McAuley, Schenker) – 4:04
3. "Anytime" (Steve Mann, McAuley) – 5:44
4. "Get Down to Bizness" (McAuley, Rocky Newton) – 4:22
5. "Shadow of the Night" (McAuley, Schenker) – 5:20
6. "What We Need" (McAuley, Schenker) – 4:13
7. "I Am Your Radio" (Newton, Kenny Stewart) – 4:47
8. "There Has to Be Another Way" (instrumental) (Schenker) – 1:49
9. "This Is My Heart" (Newton, McAuley, Schenker, Mann, Bodo Schopf, Allan Nelson) – 4:57
10. "Destiny" (Mann, McAuley) – 4:33
11. "Take Me Back" (Newton, Stewart) – 4:50

=== 2000 Japanese remaster bonus tracks ===
12. "Save Yourself" (single edit) (McAuley, Schenker) – 4:59
13. "Anytime" (single edit) (Mann, McAuley) – 5:10
14. "Vicious" (bonus track) (McAuley, Schenker) – 3:38

== Personnel ==
Band members

- Robin McAuley – lead & backing vocals
- Michael Schenker – lead, rhythm and acoustic guitars
- Steve Mann – rhythm & acoustic guitars, guitar solos on track 10, middle co-solo on track 3, keyboards, backing vocals
- Rocky Newton – bass guitar, backing vocals
- Bodo Schopf – drums

Additional musicians

- Emi Canyn, Donna McDaniel, Dave Amato, Chris Post – additional backing vocals

Production

- Frank Filipetti – producer, mixing
- Russell Anderson, John Herman, Mike Tacci – engineers
- Ted Jensen – mastering

== Charts ==
=== Album ===
Chart (1990)	Peak position
Finnish Albums (The Official Finnish Charts)	35
German Albums (Offizielle Top 100)	47
Swedish Albums (Sverigetopplistan)	34
US Billboard 200	92

Anytime

Chart (1989–1990)	Peak position
US Billboard Hot 100	69
US Mainstream Rock (Billboard)	5
