= Kevin Rooney (comedian) =

American stand-up comedian (1950–2022)

- Born: November 12, 1950
- Died: July 9, 2022 (aged 71)

Kevin Rooney (November 12, 1950 – July 9, 2022) was an American stand-up comedian, writer, and actor.

== Career ==
Rooney first began performing stand-up in 1977 in Washington, D.C., after which he moved to New York City and Los Angeles. He met Jay Leno while performing at The Improv in Hollywood, and the pair became friends and writing partners. He contributed material to Leno's special Jay Leno and the American Dream, and wrote material for Leno on Late Night with David Letterman, on which Rooney also performed stand-up comedy.

His acting roles included a guest appearance on Cheers, and as Ira Stone in the 1989 film When Harry Met Sally...

In the 1990s, Rooney began writing for sitcoms. He won two Primetime Emmy Awards for Outstanding Writing for a Variety or Music Program for his work on Dennis Miller Live. His other credits include The Golden Palace, The Naked Truth, Boston Common, and 'Til Death.

== Personal life ==
In the late 1990s, Rooney married Carole Raphaelle Davis. The two lived in the Hollywood Hills and in Nice, France.

Rooney died of complications from diabetes and renal failure on July 9, 2022. He was 71.
