= Michael Schenker =

German guitarist (born 1955)

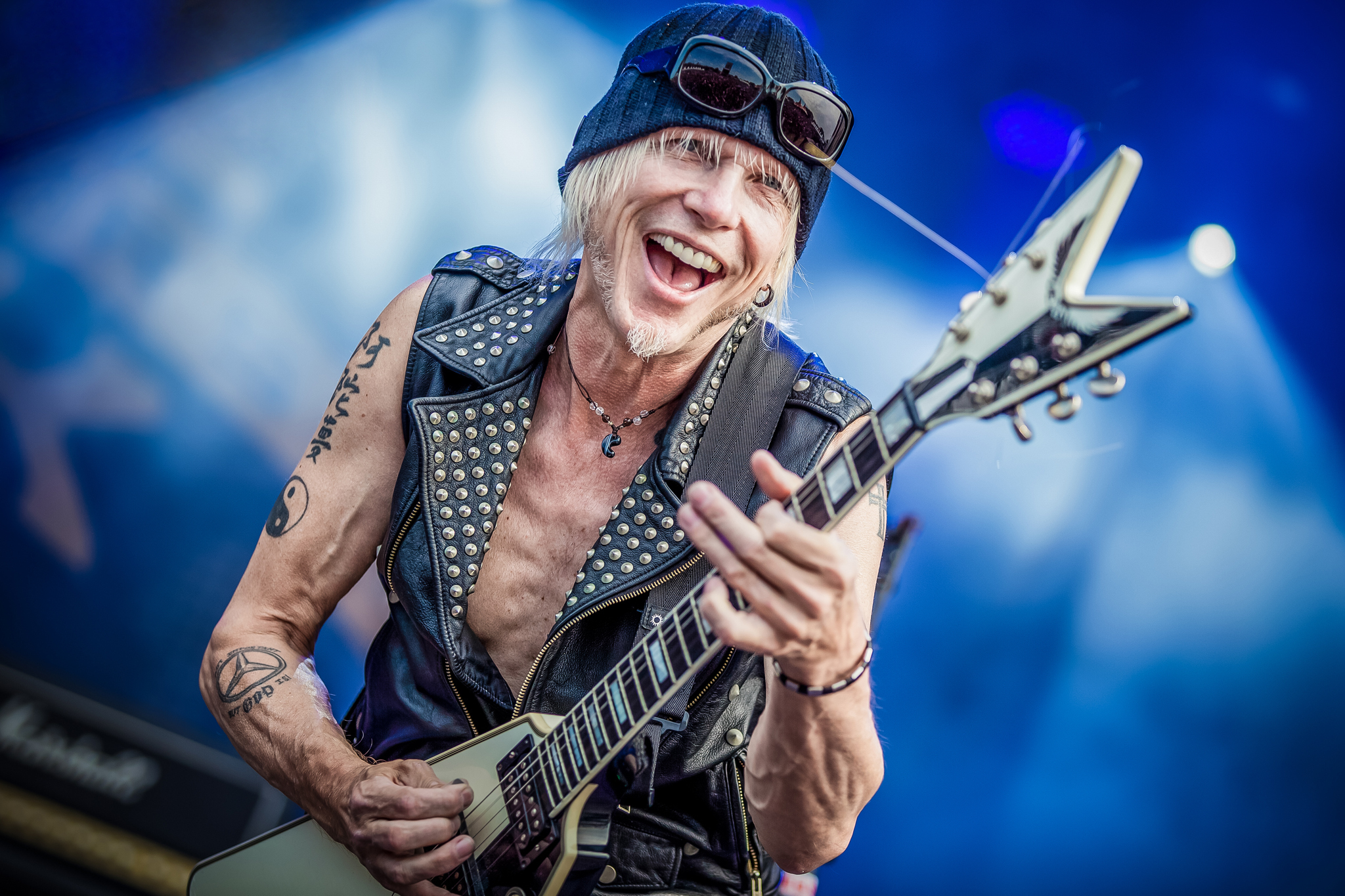
- Schenker in 2015

Background information
- Born: 10 January 1955 (age 71); Sarstedt, West Germany
- Genres: Hard rock; heavy metal
- Occupation: Guitarist
- Years active: 1966–present
- Label: Nuclear Blast
- Member of: Michael Schenker Group; Michael Schenker's Temple of Rock; Michael Schenker Fest
- Formerly of: Scorpions; UFO; McAuley Schenker Group; Contraband
- Website: michaelschenkerhimself.com

Michael Schenker (born 10 January 1955) is a German rock guitarist. He is known as the leader of the Michael Schenker Group (MSG), as a member of the British band UFO, and for his work with the Scorpions, a band he co-founded with his elder brother Rudolf.

After playing on the Scorpions' debut album Lonesome Crow in 1972, Schenker joined UFO in June 1973, recording five studio albums and the live album Strangers in the Night before leaving in 1978. He briefly rejoined the Scorpions for the recording of Lovedrive, then formed his own band, MSG, in 1979 and its later spinoff, the McAuley Schenker Group, from 1986 to 1993, after which he reformed the Michael Schenker Group. Schenker also rejoined UFO across three stints between 1993 and 2003, recording three additional albums with the band.

He is regarded as one of the most influential guitarists of the 1970s, and has been called "a legendary figure in the history of metal guitar". Schenker continues to perform and record.

== Career ==
=== Early career and rise to fame: Scorpions and UFO ===
Schenker started playing guitar at nine years old. His brother Rudolf got a Gibson Flying V guitar for his birthday, which captured his imagination. His main influences were Jimmy Page, George Harrison, Jeff Beck, Eric Clapton, Leslie West, Johnny Winter, Steve Marriott, and Rory Gallagher.

He played his first gig at 11, with Rudolf and the Scorpions at a nightclub. Schenker played with the Scorpions on their debut Lonesome Crow at the age of 16.

After recording their first album, the Scorpions opened for then–up-and-coming UK band UFO in Germany. Schenker was invited to be lead guitarist for UFO (taking over from Bernie Marsden, himself a temporary replacement for Larry Wallis who had in turn taken over for the departed Mick Bolton). With Rudolf's blessing, Schenker accepted.

Schenker co-wrote most of the songs on UFO's major label (Chrysalis Records) debut Phenomenon. His career with UFO was turbulent, with him sometimes walking off mid-song and causing shows to be cancelled. Despite successful albums and tours, Schenker unequivocally quit UFO after their show in Palo Alto, California, on 29 October 1978. During this tour, the band had recorded six concerts, from which selected tracks would make up their live album Strangers in the Night, released after he left the band. "Phil Mogg later claimed that I left UFO over a disagreement about which version of 'Rock Bottom' appeared on Strangers," Schenker recalled, "but don't believe everything you read."

Schenker briefly rejoined Scorpions in late 1978, when they were recording Lovedrive. He composed and played lead guitar on "Another Piece of Meat", "Coast to Coast" and "Lovedrive". Although it was believed for decades that those three were Schenker's only contributions to the record, during an interview with satellite radio host Eddie Trunk, Schenker vehemently maintained that he contributed to the whole album. In 1979, Schenker briefly toured with the band in support of the album. He blamed his very short stay on finding out he did not enjoy playing other people's songs. He was permanently replaced by Matthias Jabs, who had originally joined Scorpions before Schenker's return.

Schenker auditioned for Aerosmith in 1979 after Joe Perry left. According to Martin Huxley, Schenker stormed out of the room after producer Gary Lyons made jokes about Nazis. After the death of Randy Rhoads, Ozzy Osbourne's first call was to Schenker to replace Rhoads, as the German guitarist and his iconic Flying V were a huge influence on the latter. But Osbourne claims Schenker made too many outlandish demands (including a private jet). Schenker himself, in an interview with KNAC radio, claims he was the one to say "no" to Osbourne: "If I would have joined Ozzy Osbourne, I would have screwed up my life. I was almost about to do it, and something told me: DON'T!!" Schenker has also claimed that at some point he was offered, but turned down joining the likes of Deep Purple, Thin Lizzy, Ian Hunter and Motörhead in order to focus on his solo career.

=== Michael Schenker Group, McAuley Schenker Group and reunion with UFO ===
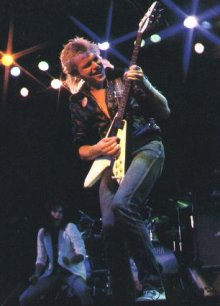
Schenker in 1981

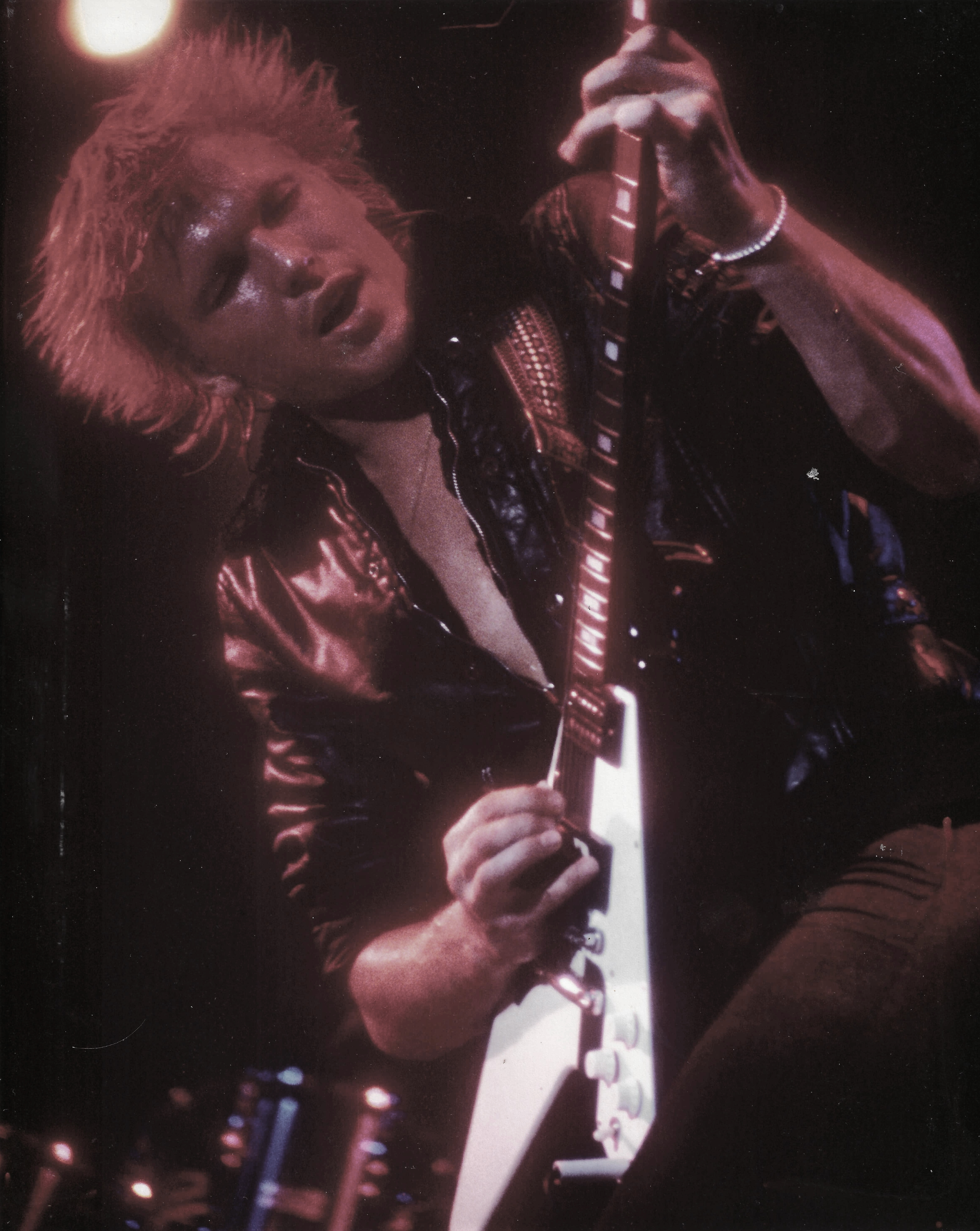
Schenker with the Michael Schenker Group in Chicago, 1980

In 1979, Schenker started a solo career by founding the Michael Schenker Group (MSG). The history of MSG is strewn with personality conflicts and incidents. In 1982, original singer Gary Barden, who sang on the first two studio albums and a live album, was fired in favour of Graham Bonnet. Bonnet lasted one album (Assault Attack) and a single gig, at Sheffield University, where he drunkenly exposed himself and was subsequently fired from the band. Barden rejoined MSG for the rest of the tour. He also appeared on the 1983 studio album (Built to Destroy) and the band's second live album (Rock Will Never Die).

After Barden's second departure, Schenker reorganized the band around himself and new singer Robin McAuley and renamed it the McAuley Schenker Group. The new incarnation of MSG was steered toward a more commercial hard rock sound. After three albums, Perfect Timing (1987), Save Yourself (1989) and M.S.G. (1991), Schenker and McAuley parted company. In the meantime, he briefly replaced Robbin Crosby in Ratt, appearing on their 1990 MTV Unplugged performance.

In 1993, Schenker rejoined UFO. He co-wrote (with Phil Mogg) nearly the whole of their reunion album, Walk on Water (1995), and toured with them briefly.

He then resurrected the Michael Schenker Group with all new members and recorded three more albums, Written in the Sand (1996), The Unforgiven (1999), and Be Aware of Scorpions (2001), before rejoining UFO for two further releases, Covenant (2000) and Sharks (2002).

=== 2000–present ===
Schenker fell on hard times in the early 2000s, despite having rejoined UFO by then. He officially left the band for good in 2003, and later released the album Arachnophobiac, which was supported by two years of touring. In 2004, recognition came from Dean Guitars, which began producing a Schenker signature Dean V (with subtle differences from the Gibson, but with the split black and white trademark Schenker finish).

2005 was the 25th anniversary of the Michael Schenker Group. Schenker put together a new album of songs called Tales of Rock'n'Roll to celebrate the anniversary and enlisted singers from each iteration of the band to sing on the album. However, in that same year the collection Heavy Hitters, a set of covers featuring Schenker and a revolving group of heavy metal all-stars, was marketed as a Michael Schenker Group album, with the result that Schenker only received a flat fee.

After nearly-disastrous North American and European tours in 2007, which included cancelled shows and less-than-stellar performances caused by heavy drinking, Schenker regained his composure and toured in the UK as Michael Schenker & Friends in 2008. That same year, Schenker worked with Gary Barden, Don Airey, Simon Phillips, and Neil Murray on a new MSG album In the Midst of Beauty, which was released in May 2008, followed by touring.

In 2009 Schenker toured extensively including Russia, UK and the US with MSG including original members Gary Barden and Chris Glen.

In November 2010, Schenker was given the Marshall "11" award in London along with other rock legends including Ron Wood and Slash. The award was presented to Schenker by Alice Cooper, with Jimmy Page, Tony Iommi and John Paul Jones also in attendance. The award is given to "those artists and musicians who represent rock 'n' roll excess and livin' on the edge."

In 2011 Schenker released a new album, Temple of Rock. It was supported with a tour of Europe, Japan and the USA. In Europe the line up included Herman Rarebell on drums and Francis Buchholz on bass, both former members of Scorpions (Rarebell also joined the band for the Japanese dates) and Doogie White, formerly singer for Rainbow and Yngwie Malmsteen. With this line-up he recorded the album Bridge the Gap which was released in 2013.

In August 2012 Schenker received a Lifetime Achievement in Rock and Roll Award from Vegas Rocks! Magazine. The award was presented by David Coverdale of Whitesnake. During the award ceremony Schenker performed with Sammy Hagar of Chickenfoot, Montrose and Van Halen.

In 2016, Schenker toured Japan under the name of "The Michael Schenker Fest" featuring current and former singers: Doogie White, Gary Barden, Graham Bonnet and Robin McAuley, bassist Chris Glen, drummer Ted MacKenna and keyboardist/guitarist Steve Mann, releasing one live album Fest: Live Tokyo International Forum Hall A (2CD/DVD) following two more albums, Revelation (2018) and Resurrection (2019). This lineup disbanded after the loss of the drummer Ted Mackenna in January that year.

In 2021, Schenker announced the return to the MSG brand, releasing Immortal with some of former MSG/Fest members: singers Michael Voss, Doogie White, Robin MacAuley and Gary Barden, bassist Barry Sparks, guitarist Steve Mann and drummer Bodo Schopp along with special guests: former Rainbow singers Joe Lynn Turner and Ronnie Romero, longtime collaborators Simon Phillips and Brian Tichy on drums. The following year MSG released the album Universal featuring a new steady lineup with Mann, Schopp, Romero and bassist Barry Sparks. And as usual some special guest such as vocalists Ralph Scheepers (Primal Fear) and Michael Kiske (Helloween), former Rainbow members, keyboardist Tony Carey, drummer Bobby Rondinelli and bassist Bob Daisley. In July 2022 Dutch bassist Barend Corbois (ex-Blind Guardian) was announced as the new touring bass player.

Schenker released an album of UFO cover songs from his initial tenure with that band, titled My Years with UFO, on September 20, 2024. The album includes contributions by Guns N' Roses members Axl Rose and Slash, Biff Byford of Saxon, former Rainbow and Deep Purple frontman Joe Lynn Turner, Stephen Pearcy of Ratt, Carmine Appice, among others. Schenker also plans to release a pair of new albums in 2025 and 2026.

== Instruments and sound ==
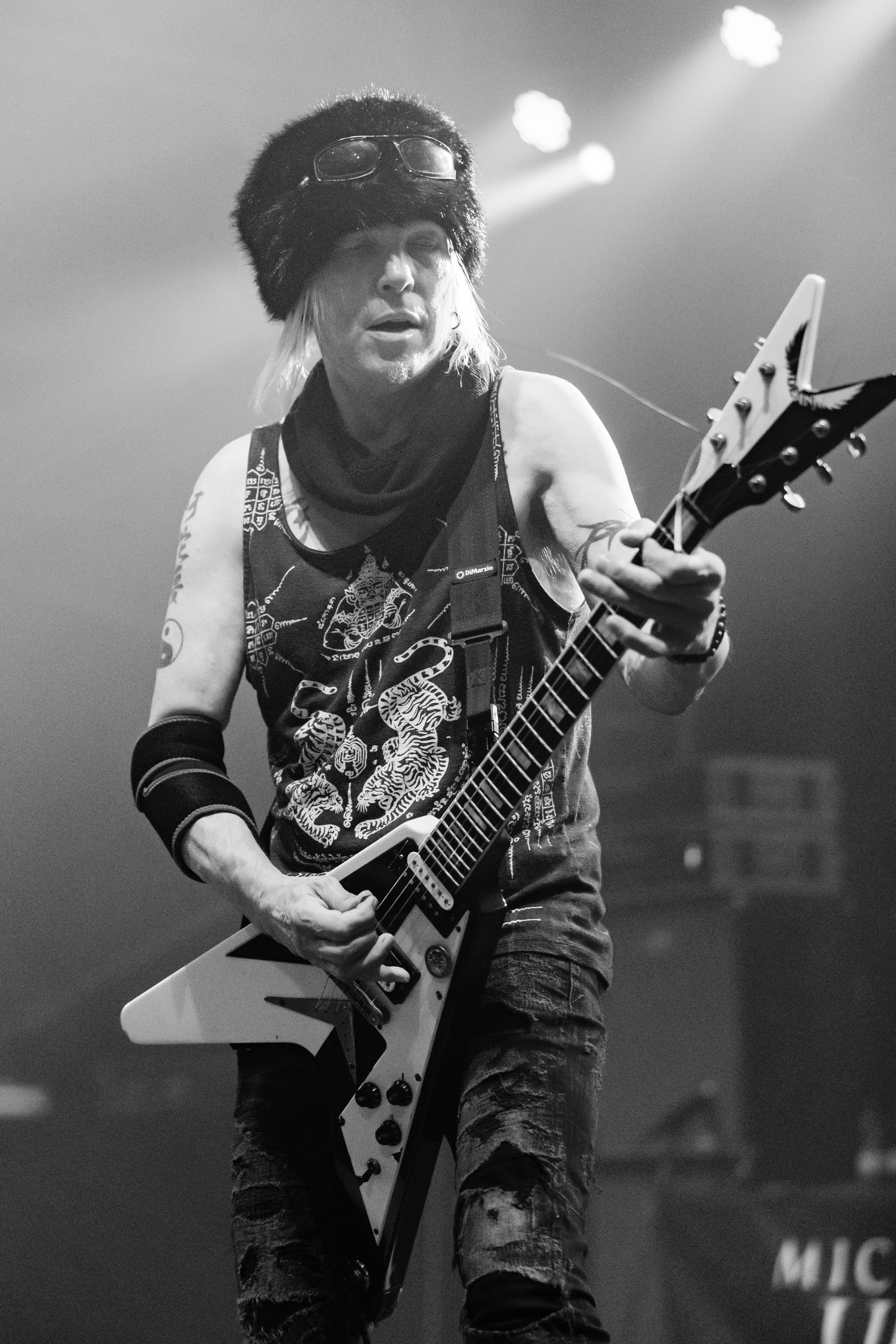
Schenker in 2022

Schenker's main guitar for most of his career was a Gibson Flying V, which he typically played through a "cocked" wah-wah pedal (switched on but left in a single position, around halfway through the travel of the foot pedal, and used as an equaliser to strengthen the midrange "sweet spot") and Marshall amplifiers. Schenker's "unmistakable midrange tone" was emphasised by the partially engaged wah pedal, as exemplified on the song "Rock Bottom" from the live UFO album Strangers in the Night, was listed among the 50 greatest tones of all time by Guitar Player magazine. Since 2004, Schenker has switched to using a signature model Dean V.

In 2007 Dean Guitars, after producing Schenker's signature Dean V, also made two acoustic models with the familiar black and white "V" design.

== Awards and recognition ==
- Placed on Guitar World magazine's 100 Greatest Heavy Metal Guitarists.
- In 2010 Schenker was given the Marshall "11" award.
- Schenker accepted his "Rock Guitar Legend" award at the Vegas Rocks! Magazine Music Awards 2012.
- On 16 June 2014, Schenker was honored the Golden God Icon Award at the Metal Hammer Golden God Awards at the IndiO2 in London.

== Influence ==
Schenker has been on the covers of many guitar magazines and has influenced many notable guitar players, including Kirk Hammett and James Hetfield (Metallica), Dave Mustaine and Marty Friedman (Megadeth), Dimebag Darrell (Pantera), Alex Skolnick and Eric Peterson (Testament), Mike McCready (Pearl Jam), Gary Holt (Exodus), Rob Cavestany (Death Angel), Adrian Smith (Iron Maiden), Slash, John Norum (Europe), Paul Gilbert, Randy Rhoads, George Lynch (Dokken), Warren DeMartini (Ratt), John Petrucci (Dream Theater), Michael Amott (Arch Enemy), Dan Spitz (Anthrax), Criss Oliva (Savatage), Jeff Waters (Annihilator), Phil Campbell (Motörhead), Kerry King (Slayer), and Syu (Galneryus).

== Michael Schenker Group band members ==
Current members

- Michael Schenker – lead guitar, backing vocals (1979–1984, 1986–1993, 1996–present)
- Steve Mann – keyboards, rhythm guitar, backing vocals (1986–1987, 1988–1991, 2016–present)
- Bodo Schopf – drums (1986–1987, 1988–1991, 2007–2008, 2019–present)
- Barend Courbois – bass, backing vocals (2021–present)
- Erik Grönwall – lead vocals (2025–present)

== Discography ==
Year	Band	Title	Notes
1966	Michael Schenker	"LIVE" At Age 11 With The Enervates	Live with the Enervates. 13 September 1966, Beat Club 1
1972	Scorpions	Lonesome Crow	
1974	UFO	Phenomenon	
1975	UFO	Force It	
1976	UFO	No Heavy Petting	
1977	UFO	Lights Out	
1978	UFO	Obsession	
1979	UFO	Strangers in the Night	Live
1979	Scorpions	Lovedrive	Lead guitar, backing vocals on 1/2/4/7/8/10
1980	Michael Schenker Group	The Michael Schenker Group	
1981	Michael Schenker Group	MSG	
1982	Michael Schenker Group	One Night at Budokan	Live
1982	Michael Schenker Group	Assault Attack	
1983	Michael Schenker Group	Built to Destroy	
1984	Michael Schenker Group	Rock Will Never Die	Live, CD/VHS
1984	Michael Schenker Group	Super Rock '84 in Japan	Live, Laserdisc/VHS
1987	McAuley Schenker Group	Perfect Timing	
1989	McAuley Schenker Group	Save Yourself	
1991	McAuley Schenker Group	M.S.G.	
1991	Contraband	Contraband	
1992	UFO	BBC Radio 1 Live In Concert	Live, Tracks 9/10/11/12, Recorded 1974 and 1975
1993	Michael Schenker Group	BBC Radio One Live In Concert	Live, Recorded at Reading Rock Festival 29 August 1982
1992	McAuley Schenker Group	Nightmare: The Acoustic M.S.G.	5-song EP
1992	McAuley Schenker Group	"Unplugged" Live	Live
1993	Michael Schenker (Solo)	Thank You	
1995	UFO	Walk on Water	
1996	UFO	On with the Action	Live, Recorded at the London Roundhouse on 25 April 1976
1996	Michael Schenker Group	Written in the Sand	
1997	Michael Schenker Group	The Michael Schenker Story Live	Live, CD/VHS
1998	Michael Schenker (Solo)	Thank You with Orchestra	
1998	UFO	Werewolves of London	Live, Recorded at Wolverhampton Civic Hall on 10 February 1998
1999	Michael Schenker Group	The Unforgiven	
1999	Michael Schenker Group	The Unforgiven World Tour 1999	Live
2000	Michael Schenker Group	Live in Japan: The Unforgiven World Tour 2000	Live, VHS
2000	Michael Schenker (Solo)	Adventures of the Imagination	
2000	UFO	Covenant	
2000	Michael Schenker (Solo)	MS 2000: Dreams and Expressions	
2000	Michael Schenker (Solo)	The Odd Trio	
2001	Michael Schenker Group	Be Aware of Scorpions	
2002	Michael Schenker Group	Reactivate Live	Live, Recorded in Eerie, PA, 20 November 1980 and The Country Club, Los Angeles, CA, 22 December 1980
2002	UFO	Sharks	
2002	Michael Schenker (Solo)	Thank You 2	
2002	Michael Schenker (Solo)	Thank You 3	
2003	Michael Schenker (Solo)	Thank You 4	
2003	Michael Schenker Group	Arachnophobiac	
2003	The Plot (Pete Way/Michael Schenker)	The Plot	
2003	Amy Schugar/Michael Schenker	Under Construction	
2003	UFO	Live on Earth	Live, Recorded at Rockpalast, Vienna, Austria on 28 January 1998
2003	Michael Schenker Group	Back To Attack Live	Live, Recorded at Kosei Nenkin Hall, Sapporo, Japan 18 January 1984
2004	Michael Schenker Group	World Wide Live 2004	Live, DVD
2004	Schenker Pattison Summit	The Endless Jam	All covers
2005	Schenker Pattison Summit	The Endless Jam Continues	All covers
2005	Michael Schenker Group	Live in Tokyo 1997	Live, DVD
2005	Michael Schenker Group	Heavy Hitters	All covers
2006	Michael Schenker Group	Tales of Rock'n'Roll – Twenty-Five Years Celebration	
2008	Michael Schenker Group (Schenker/Barden)	In the Midst of Beauty	
2009	Schenker/Barden Acoustic Project	Gipsy Lady	
2010	Michael Schenker Group	The 30th Anniversary Concert – Live in Tokyo	Live, CD/DVD/Bluray
2011	Michael Schenker's Temple of Rock	Temple of Rock	
2012	Michael Schenker's Temple of Rock	Temple of Rock – Live in Europe	Live, CD/DVD/Bluray
2013	Michael Schenker's Temple of Rock	Bridge the Gap	
2015	Michael Schenker's Temple of Rock	Spirit on a Mission	
2016	Michael Schenker's Temple of Rock	On a Mission – Live in Madrid	Live, CD/DVD/Bluray
2017	Michael Schenker Fest	Live Tokyo International Forum Hall A	Live, CD/DVD/Bluray
2018	Michael Schenker Fest	Resurrection	
2019	Michael Schenker Fest	Revelation	
2021	Michael Schenker Group	Immortal	
2022	Michael Schenker Group	Universal	
2023	UFO	Lights Out in Babenhausen 1993	Live, recorded at the Stadhalle in Babenhausen, Germany on 12 December 1993
2024	Michael Schenker (Solo)	My Years with UFO	All covers of songs from Schenker's initial 1973-78 tenure with UFO
2025	Michael Schenker Group	Don't Sell Your Soul	

=== Other Schenker projects ===
- Look at Me Now, (Bernie Marsden) (1981) as special guest
- Legends of Rock at Castle Donington (2001) Live
- Siggi Schwarz & The Electric Guitar Legends (2004)
- Siggi Schwarz & The Rock Legends (2005)
- Heavy Metal Thunder (2005)
- Numbers from the Beast (2005)
- The Agony and Xtasy, (Gary Barden) (2006) as special guest
- Siggi Schwarz & Michael Schenker – Live Together 2004 (2006) All covers
- Siggi Schwarz & Michael Schenker – Live Together 2004 (The Bonus Edition) (2011)
- We Wish You a Metal Xmas and a Headbanging New Year (2-CD Special Edition) (2010)
- Seeking Major Tom, (William Shatner) (2011) as special guest

=== Compilations ===
- Portfolio (1987)
- Anthology (1991)
- The Collection (1991)
- Essential Michael Schenker Group (1992)
- Michael Schenker Anthology 1974-1984 (UFO – MSG) (1993)
- The Story of Michael Schenker (1994)
- Armed & Ready: The Best of the Michael Schenker Group (1994, Music Club/Music Collection International)
- The Michael Schenker Story Live (1994); also see The Michael Schenker Story Live, the audio recording.
- Masters of Rock – The Michael Schenker Group (2001)
- Forever and More: The Best of Michael Schenker (2003)
- The Mad Axeman Live (2007) reissues of Reactivate Live and Back To Attack Live
- Doctor Doctor: The Kulick Sessions (2007); re-released as Guitar Master: The Kulick Sessions (2008), and By Invitation Only (2011)
- The Best of the Michael Schenker Group 1980-1984 (2008)
- Guitar Master (2009)
- Greatest Riffs (2009, Shrapnel SH-1200)
- Instrumental Intensity (2009, Shrapnel SH-1206)
- Walk the Stage (The Official Bootleg Box Set 1980-1983) (2009, Chrysalis 50999 698062 23)
- UFO (Official Bootleg Box Set 1975-1982) (2009, Chrysalis 50999 965680 26); Schenker is featured on 4 of the 6 discs
- Blood of the Sun (2014, Collectors Dream Records)
- Rock Shock (2022, Metal Bastard Enterprises)
