= Heaven (Australian band) =

Australian heavy metal band

- Origin: Sydney, Australia
- Genres: Heavy metal, hard rock
- Years active: 1980–1985, 1998, 2001, 2012, 2022
- Labels: RCA, Deluxe
- Past members: Allan Fryer; Bradford Kelly; Jasper Lynam; Joe Turtur; John Haese; Mick Cocks; Mitch Perry; Mark Evans; John Lalor; Tommy Dimitroff; Ronnie Zade; Darren Rourke; Mark Cunningham; Dennis Feldman; Robbie Hannah; Nye Jones; Chris Caffery; Scott Howe; Mich O'Shea; Timi Heiser; John Paul Dutton; Rodger Weiss; Scott Cothran; Bobby Enloe; Dave Anthony; Matt Stole; Jeff Burns; Bruno Renzella; Mike Johnson; Laurie Marlow; Rowan Robertson; Joe Turtur; John Haese; Greg Belt; Brian Christian; John Richards; Todd Frizzell; Brad Dunn; Tony Taylor

Heaven is an Australian heavy metal band from Sydney, Australia, that formed in 1980. The band recorded three albums and toured throughout the United States during the 1980s. The group's original style was similar to that of AC/DC but in later years went in a more commercial heavy metal direction along the lines of Judas Priest.

== History ==
The band was originally formed in Adelaide under the name Fat Lip, which featured Scottish-born Allan Fryer, bassist Laurie Marlow, and drummer Joe Turtur. Soon after the band moved to Sydney, AC/DC singer Bon Scott died in London and some unsubstantiated reports suggested that band was considering Fryer as a replacement. Fryer left Fat Lip and returned to Adelaide but he was never called upon to audition. Once back in Sydney, Fat Lip now consisted of Fryer and Marlow, Aldo Civitico (ex-Scandal) on drums and guitarist Bradford Kelly, originally from the band Swanee. Civitico dropped out just before the band signed its record deal, and Turtur joined the band. John Haese was also added as rhythm guitarist. Shortly afterward, Fat Lip came to the attention of Michael Browning, a Sydney music industry figure who had managed AC/DC in the 1970s and had just started a new record label called DeLuxe, to which he had signed INXS. Fat Lip began recording an album for DeLuxe, but changed its name to Heaven during the sessions. The album, Twilight of Mischief, was preceded in late 1981 by a single, "Fantasy". A second single, "In the Beginning" became the album's title track when it was released by CBS in the US under that name.

John Haese left Heaven after the album was released and was replaced by Mick Cocks, formerly of Rose Tattoo. After a successful Australian tour supporting Iron Maiden, the band then went to the United States and also found some success there, particularly on the West Coast and toured with Judas Priest, Mötley Crüe, Black Sabbath and Kiss. They recorded a second album for RCA during 1983 called Where Angels Fear to Tread. The album was supported by a single, "Rock School" that received heavy airplay on MTV and featured guest contributions from Ronnie James Dio, Lita Ford and Glenn Hughes. After this, Cocks and Turtur left Heaven.

Former AC/DC bass player Mark Evans and John Lalor were brought in as replacements (possibly the only time Evans was featured as a guitarist) but the relationship ended directly after a successful headlining tour of Australia. Heaven disbanded due to conflicts with Fryer.

In 1984, Fryer recruited drummer Tommy Dimitroff (in replace of original drummer Ronnie Zade) and returned to America to reform Heaven, this time with ex-Talas guitarist Mitch Perry and New York City musician Mark Cunningham, who had most recently been in a band called Cathedral. Dennis Feldman, formerly of Ram-Jam and The Michael Schenker group also joined the new Heaven line-up on bass and the group recorded the album. The band secured a spot opening for Kiss on their summer 1984 tour. Columbia A&R man, Mason Munoz, signed the band and recruited Paul O'Neill to produce and co-write the album Knocking on Heaven's Door. The album's title track was a heavy metal cover of the Bob Dylan song. However prior to completion, Munoz was replaced by a new A&R representative and Columbia brought in another mixer. After this, Fryer moved to Texas and forged ahead keeping the Heaven name alive with local talent, such as guitarist Perry Parris, Scott Howe, John Paul Dutton, Rodger "bam-bam" Weiss, Bryan Cameron and Timi Heiser. Nye Jones, Scott Cothran and Steve Daehnert recorded Time For Terror. The players from Austin, Texas, also recorded on the Mötley Crüe Tribute CD Home Sweet Home, and was the number one voted song on the CD. The song was written by Allan Fryer and Tommy Lee, and dedicated to Vince Neils' daughter, Skylar Neil, who died from cancer. All the CD proceeds went to the Skylar Neil Memorial Fund.

=== Reformations and Death of Allan Fryer ===
In 1985, Heaven opened for Christian metal band Stryper in Corpus Christi, Texas.

Kelly, Marlow, Fryer and Haese reformed Heaven in Sydney in 1998 to play two shows, with Theo Kats and Joe Turtur alternating behind the drum kit. After this, Kats and Marlow started working on new material with guitarist Kevin Pratt. Pratt had featured in Sydney bands Boss and BB Steal during the 1980s, recording an album with each. The collaboration was designed as a new Heaven album but Fryer returned home to Texas and the project ran out of money. Yet another reformation happened in 2001 however, when Fryer, Marlow, Kats and Pratt recruited guitarist Ross Flynn and toured as Heaven in support of Judas Priest's Australian tour. Immediately after these shows, Fryer again returned to America.

On 4 June 2015 it was announced that Heaven's vocalist, Allan Fryer, had died after a long battle with cancer. He was survived by his daughter, Kallan and four grandchildren.

Reformation 2025/26

Heaven has reformed over the last couple of years again performing a handful of shows in NSW/QLD. They have also announced new shows in both Sydney and Melbourne in August 2026 and a Japan tour in November 2026 with new music soon to be forthcoming.

== Band members ==
- Steve Down – rhythm/lead guitar
- Ross Flynn - rhythm/lead guitar
- Kevin Pratt – rhythm/lead guitar
- Laurie Marlow – bass guitar & vocals
- Brendan Maguire – drums
- Pete Millwood – lead vocals

=== 2022 Reformation ===
Heaven had most recently reformed with original members Laurie Marlow and John Haese, performing in Sydney in November 2022.

== Discography ==
=== Studio albums ===
Title	Album details	Charts	
Title	Album details	AUS	US Rock
Twilight of Mischief / Bent	Released: August 1982; Label: Deluxe Records (VPL1-6614)	61	—
Where Angels Fear to Tread	Released: 1983; Label: Deluxe Records/Columbia	—	33
Knockin' on Heaven's Door	Released: 1985; Label: Columbia	—	—
