= Far Corporation =

British cover band

Far Corporation were a multi-national band created by German record producer Frank Farian, who created the bands Boney M. and Milli Vanilli. The name was shortened from "Frank Farian Corporation", which was originally put together to record a cover of the Paul Simon piece "Mother and Child Reunion" as a charity record and reached the top 10 in several European countries. That group's lineup included members of Barclay James Harvest, Toto, Boney M and Force Majeure.

== History ==
Far Corporation's primary claim to fame is their cover of "Stairway to Heaven". Far Corporation was actually the first group to make the singles charts with this song as Led Zeppelin had never released it as a single. In fact, it was the only version of the song that charted on the US Billboard Hot 100, reaching #89 in October 1986. Some of the musicians Farian assembled included vocalist Robin McAuley, vocalist Henry Gorman, drummers Curt Cress and Peter John Bold a South African Session Drummer tour Drummer for Isaac Hayes, Rita Cooldige and Australian John Paul Young, and three members of Toto: vocalist Bobby Kimball, keyboardist David Paich, and guitarist Steve Lukather. Far Corporation released its first album Division One in 1985 on IMP/ATCO Records and their cover of "Stairway to Heaven" reached #8 on the UK Singles Chart. It also reached #9 in Ireland and the following year peaked at #16 in South Africa and number 23 in Australia.

Also included on the album was a cover of Free's "Fire and Water" (their second single).

The band was promoted by a full playback performance at German TV ZDF in the show "Rockpop". The show was also attended by Robert Plant, who backstage congratulated Robin McAuley for his great performance. Some rehearsal shots were used for Puma sportswear commercials underlaid by "Live is Life" hit of the Austrian band Opus making the impression of FAR Corporation performing the Opus hit.

A second album, Advantage, was completed for a 1987 release, heralded by the new single "One by One". Both this as well as the second single — a cover of Cockney Rebel's "Sebastian" — failed to reach the charts, and the album was eventually scrapped. Two years later, another complete track, "She's Back Again", appeared on the soundtrack to the German TV show "Blaues Blut" in 1989. Three of the album's lost recordings, "Make Believe", "Big Brother", and "No Alibi", surfaced as Bobby Kimball duets on Farian artist Jayne (Collins)'s Ambush in the Night album (1989), Milli Vanilli's second album The Moment of Truth (1991), and John Davis's solo album Still Be Loving You (1990). The rest, bar "One by One", were recycled along with a few new recordings on the group's second release, 1994's Solitude on MCI-BMG. This time they were joined by former Thin Lizzy and 21 Guns guitarist Scott Gorham; included on the album was a cover of the 21 Guns song "Just a Wish". Mostly assembled in honour of Farian's 25 years anniversary as a producer, the album failed to repeat the success of "Stairway to Heaven".

== Discography ==
=== Division One (1985) ===
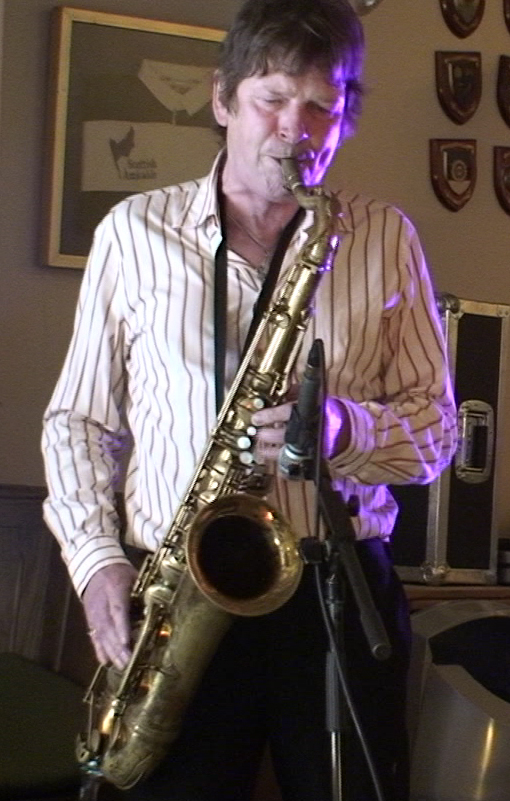
Saxophoninst Mel Collins. Credit on debutalbum Division One

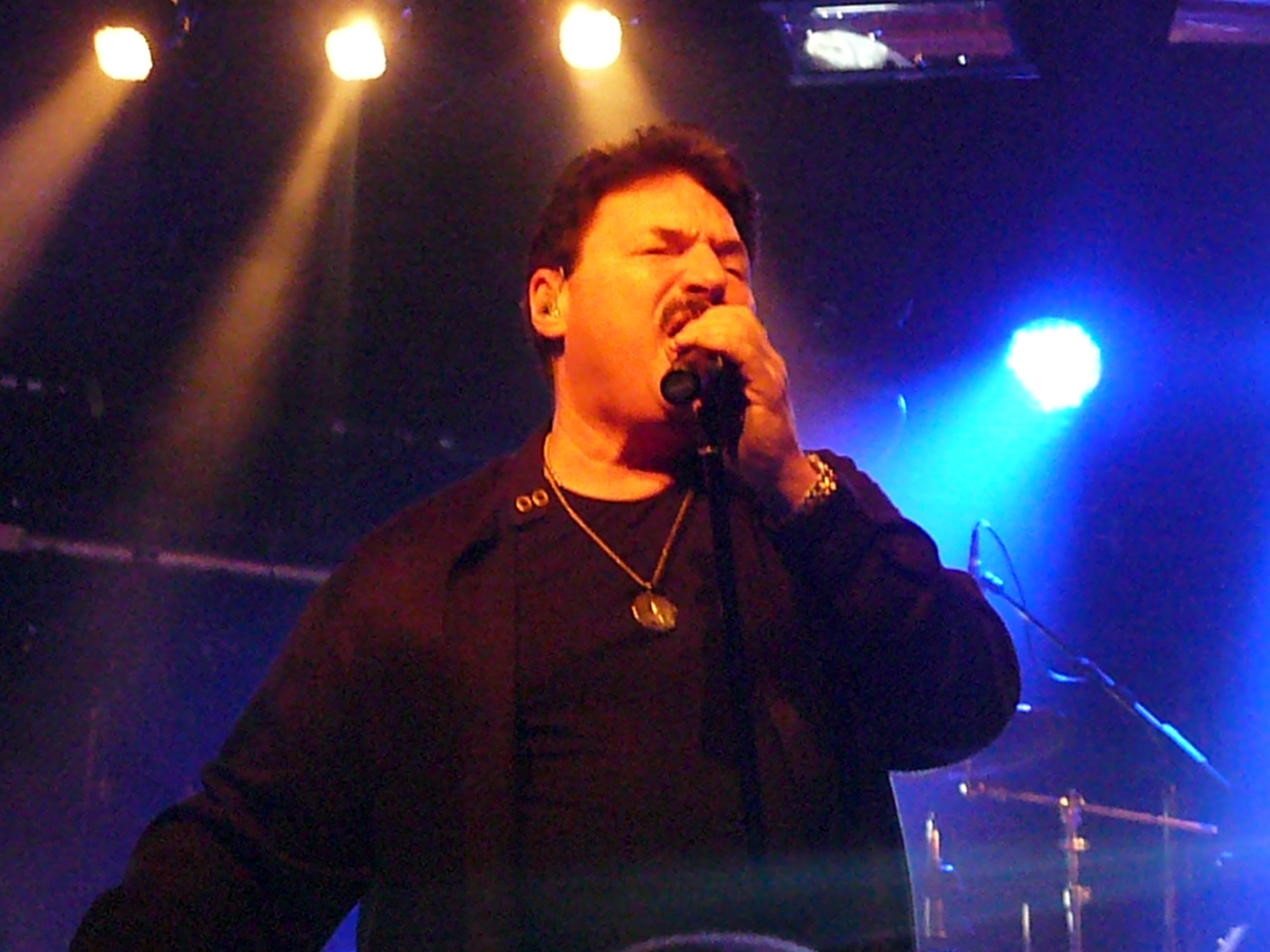
Bobby Kimball of Toto. Singer and for several album tracks credit as composer

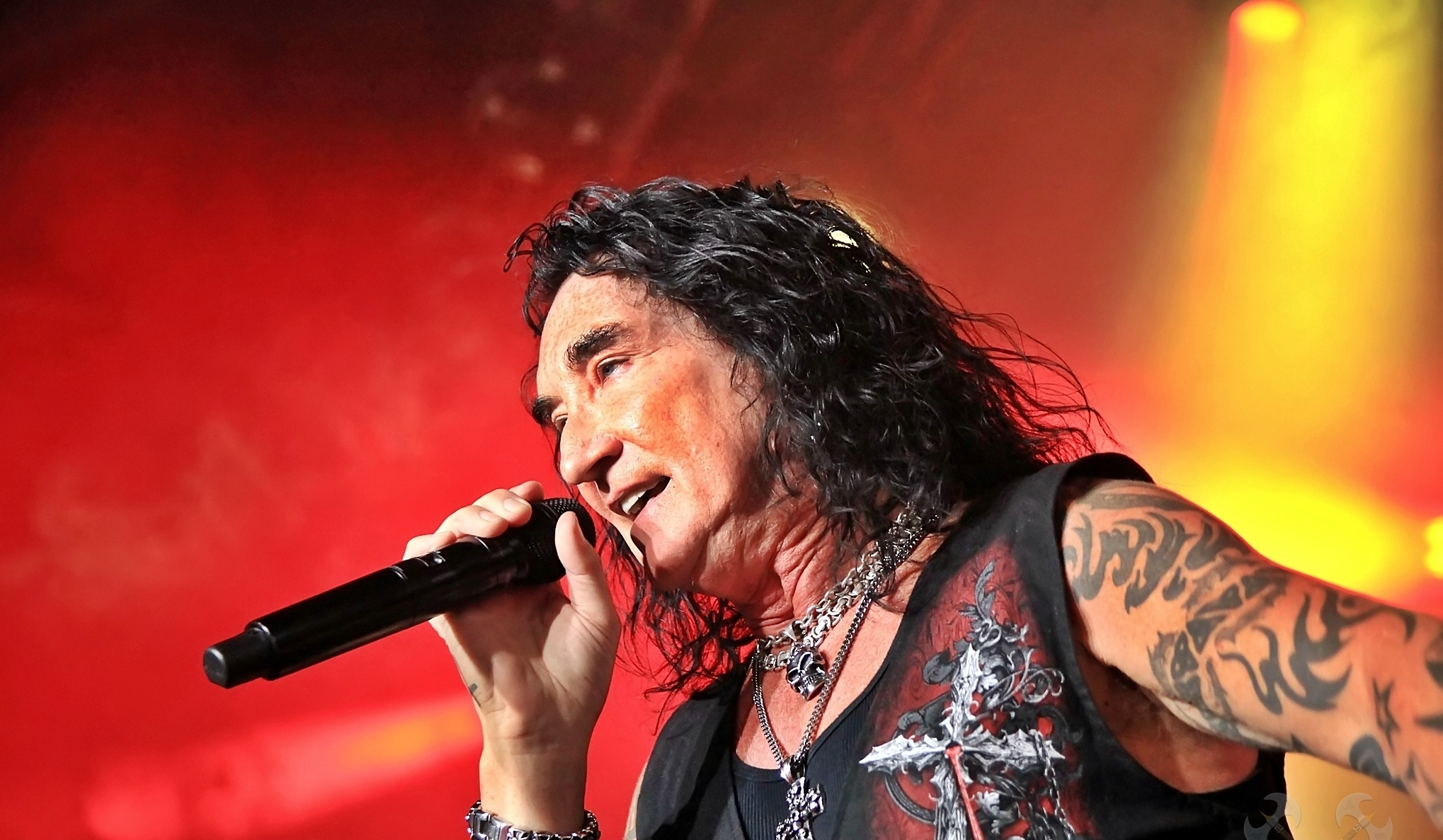
Singer Robin McAuley. On the song Rikki Don't Lose That Number credit as one of the lead singers

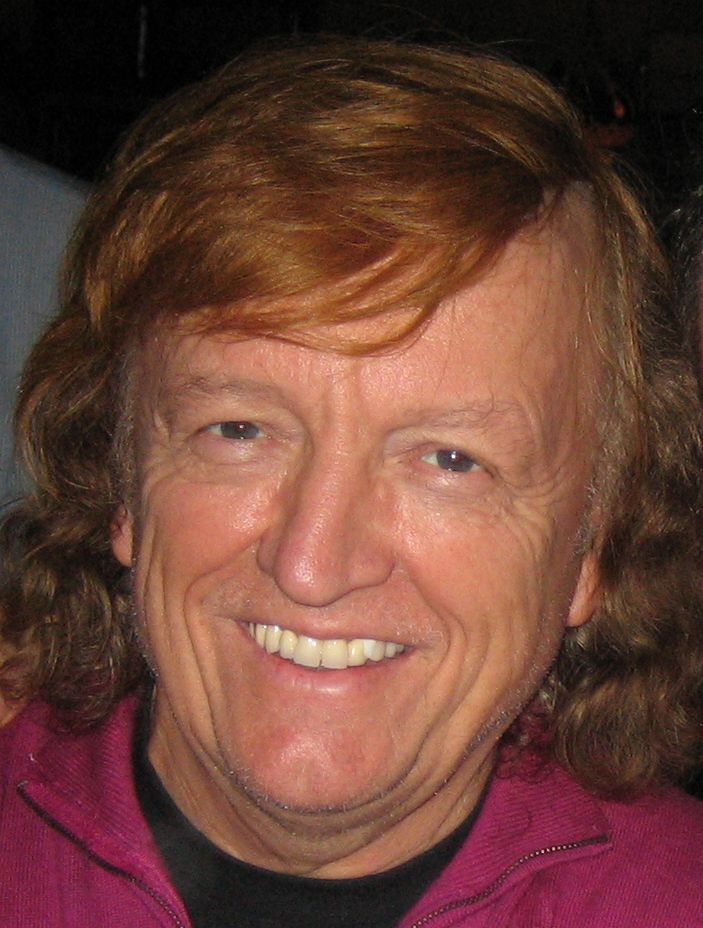
Frank Farian, Founder of Far Corporation, producer, backing vocalist and for several album tracks partly composer

1. "Stairway to Heaven" (Led Zeppelin cover) – 9:34
2. "You Are the Woman" – 4:33
3. "One of Your Lovers" – 3:44
4. "Live Inside Your Dreams" – 3:32
5. "Johnny, Don't Go the Distance" – 6:34
6. "Fire and Water" (Free cover) – 3:55
7. "If You Could See You Through My Eyes" – 3:48
8. "No One Else Will Do" – 3:30
9. "Rock 'N' Roll Connection" – 3:36

=== Advantage (1987) - Unreleased album ===
1. "One by One" – 4:24
2. "Sebastian" (Cockney Rebel cover) – 6:03
3. "You Never Have to Say You Love Me" – 3:40
4. "She's Back Again" – 4:18
5. "Make Believe" (> Jayne Collins, 1989)
6. "Big Brother" (> The Real Milli Vanilli, 1991)
7. "No Alibi" (> John Davis (singer), 1990)
8. "Full Moon" – 4:05
9. "Hole In The Air"
10. "Solitude"

=== Solitude (1994) ===
1. "Rainy Days" – 4:40
2. "She's Back Again" – 4:18
3. "Solitude" – 4:52
4. "You Never Have to Say You Love Me" – 3:21
5. "Full Moon" – 4:05
6. "Rikki Don't Lose That Number" (Steely Dan cover) – 4:10
7. "Just a Wish" (21 Guns cover) – 4:15
8. "Hole in the Air" – 3:38
9. "Sebastian" (Cockney Rebel cover) – 6:03
10. "You Change My Life" – 3:55
11. "(Bonus Track) One of Your Lovers [Remix '94]" – 3:49
12. "(Bonus Track) Stairway to Heaven [Remix '94]" – 8:46
