= Robin McAuley =

Irish singer

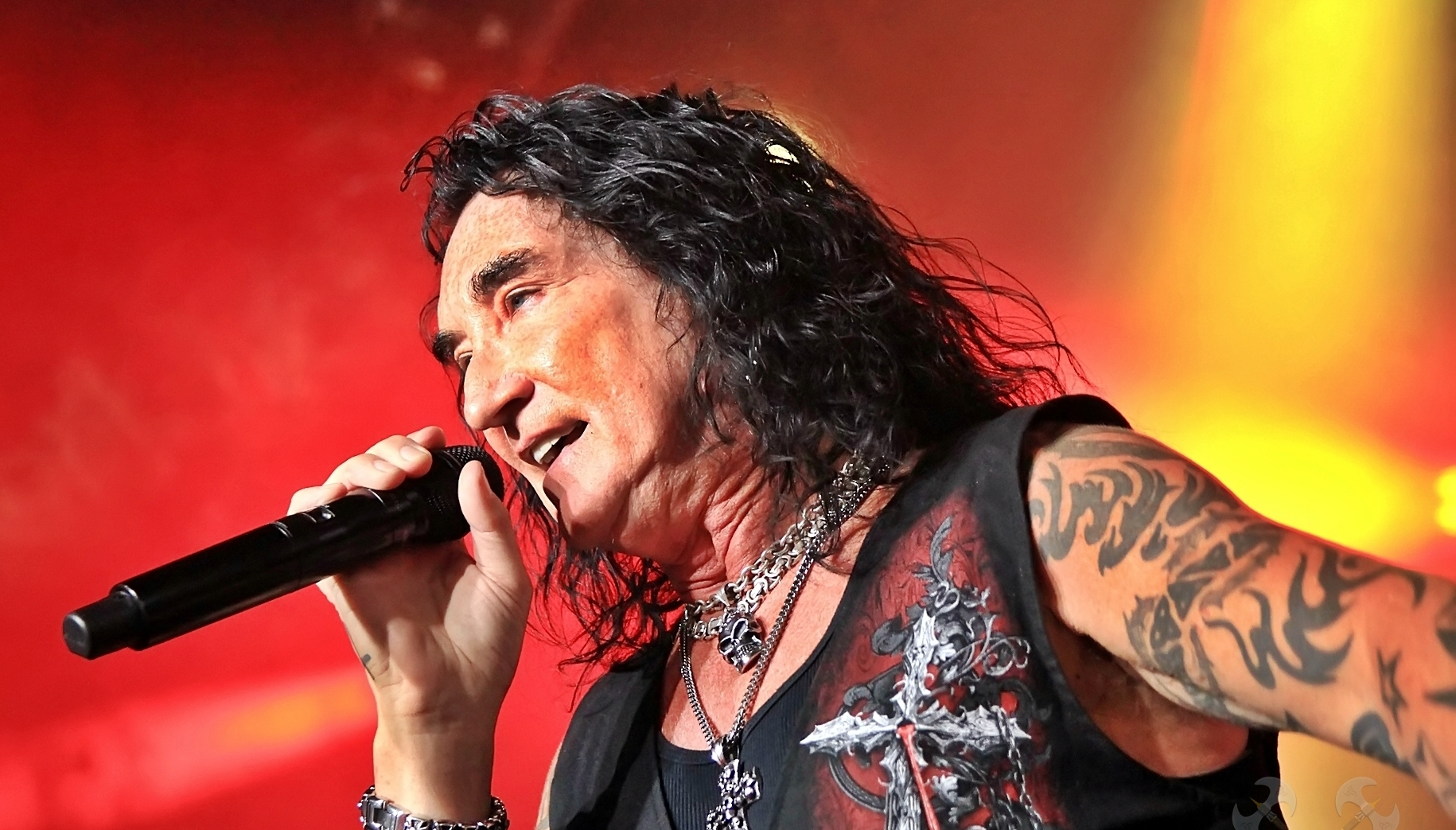
- McAuley performing in 2024

Background information
- Born: 20 January 1953 (age 73); County Meath, Ireland
- Origin: Dublin, Ireland
- Genres: Hard rock, heavy metal
- Occupation: Singer
- Years active: 1981–present
- Website: robinmcauley.com

Robin McAuley (born 20 January 1953) is an Irish singer. He is best known as the vocalist for the rock band McAuley Schenker Group from 1986 to 1993, during which time the band released three studio albums: Perfect Timing, Save Yourself and M.S.G., a live album, Unplugged Live, and a Japan-only EP, Nightmare: The Acoustic M.S.G. He made further appearances with Schenker in 2012, and also in 2016 with Michael Schenker Fest, alongside original M.S.G. singers Gary Barden and Graham Bonnet, and Doogie White of Michael Schenker's Temple of Rock.

In 1985, McAuley recorded a version of the Paul and Barry Ryan song, "Eloise"; this was released as a single. In 1991, he recorded a song called "Teach Me How to Dream", which was included on the soundtrack to the spy action comedy film, If Looks Could Kill as the love theme.

McAuley has also performed with Grand Prix, Survivor and Far Corporation, including singing on the latter's UK #8 single, a version of Led Zeppelin's "Stairway to Heaven". In 1999, McAuley released a solo album, Business As Usual, which was written and recorded with the help of future Survivor bandmate, Frankie Sullivan.

McAuley is also a longstanding member of Raiding the Rock Vault cast, and vocalist for the all-star project Black Swan, which also features Reb Beach and fellow Rock Vault alumni, Jeff Pilson and Matt Starr. Black Swan's debut album, Shake the World, was released in February 2020. In a 2021 interview with Pariah Burke, McAuley stated that this particular album is his personal favourite out of all those that he has recorded.

McAuley has also been known to perform alongside his son, Casey.

McAuley performed at Firefest Festival (10 Years After), which was held in the UK at Manchester Academy on 11–13 October 2024. The singer headlined on the Saturday night, on a bill which also included Touch and Cats in Space.

== Discography ==
=== with Grand Prix ===
- There for None to See (1982)
- Samurai (1983)

=== with GMT ===
- War Games (1985)

=== with Far Corporation ===
- Division One (1985)
- Solitude (1994)

=== with McAuley Schenker Group ===
- Perfect Timing (1987)
- Save Yourself (1989)
- M.S.G. (1991)

=== Solo albums ===
- Business as Usual (1999)
- Standing on the Edge (2021)
- Alive (2023)
- Soulbound (2025)

=== with Michael Schenker Fest ===
- Resurrection (2018)
- Revelation (2019)

=== with Black Swan ===
- Shake the World (2020)
- Generation Mind (2022)
- Paralyzed (2026)
