= McAuley Schenker Group =

Rock band

- McAuley Schenker Group in 1989

Background information
- Origin: Los Angeles, California, U.S.
- Genres: Hard rock; glam metal; arena rock
- Years active: 1986–1993, 2012
- Labels: Capitol; EMI; Impact
- Spinoff of: Michael Schenker Group
- Past members: Robin McAuley; Michael Schenker; Mitch Perry; Rocky Newton; Bodo Schopf; Steve Mann; Jesse Harms; Jeff Pilson; James Kottak; Spencer Sercombe

McAuley Schenker Group (commonly abbreviated to as MSG) was a multi-national rock band based in Los Angeles featuring core members Robin McAuley (vocals) and Michael Schenker (guitar), a successor (and eventual predecessor) to Schenker's earlier band Michael Schenker Group. McAuley was initially contacted to replace singer Gary Barden in MSG. However, the strong partnership immediately formed between McAuley and Schenker led to the change of the name from Michael Schenker Group to McAuley Schenker Group, retaining the same initials of the previous band MSG.

The band consisted of German, Irish, American, and British members. It could be considered a supergroup, as all members had solid musical careers; for example, guitarist Steve Mann had performed on albums by Tytan, Sweet, Saxon and alongside bassist Rocky Newton in Lionheart. Newton had previously fronted the short-lived late-1970s group The Next Band, which also featured one-time Def Leppard drummer Frank Noon. Guitarist Mitch Perry had replaced Yngwie Malmsteen in Steeler, played with Billy Sheehan in Talas and recorded an album with Australian hard rockers Heaven. Drummer Bodo Schopf had credits with Eloy, among others, and later joined Steve Mann in Sweet. They relocated to Los Angeles, trying to exploit the increasing popularity of hard rock and glam metal in the US. They released three studio albums, one EP and an acoustic live album before disbanding.

Their first album Perfect Timing was released in 1987, and included their first hit "Gimme Your Love". Two years later, Save Yourself was released, giving this incarnation of MSG its biggest hit with the power ballad "Anytime". M.S.G. followed in 1992 and "Unplugged" Live came out in 1993.

After the 1992 tour with a strictly acoustic set and the release of the unplugged live, in 1993 McAuley and Schenker went their separate ways, the first getting married and retiring from the music scene for a few years, the latter working on his first solo album and eventually reforming the Michael Schenker Group in 1996.

After a stint fronting Survivor, McAuley started cooperating with Schenker again, playing 26 shows across the US in February and March 2012.

== Discography ==
=== Studio albums ===
- Perfect Timing (1987)
- Save Yourself (1989)
- M.S.G. (1991)

=== Live albums ===
- "Unplugged" Live (1992)

=== Extended plays ===
- Nightmare: The Acoustic M.S.G. (1992)
