= List of Michael Schenker band members =

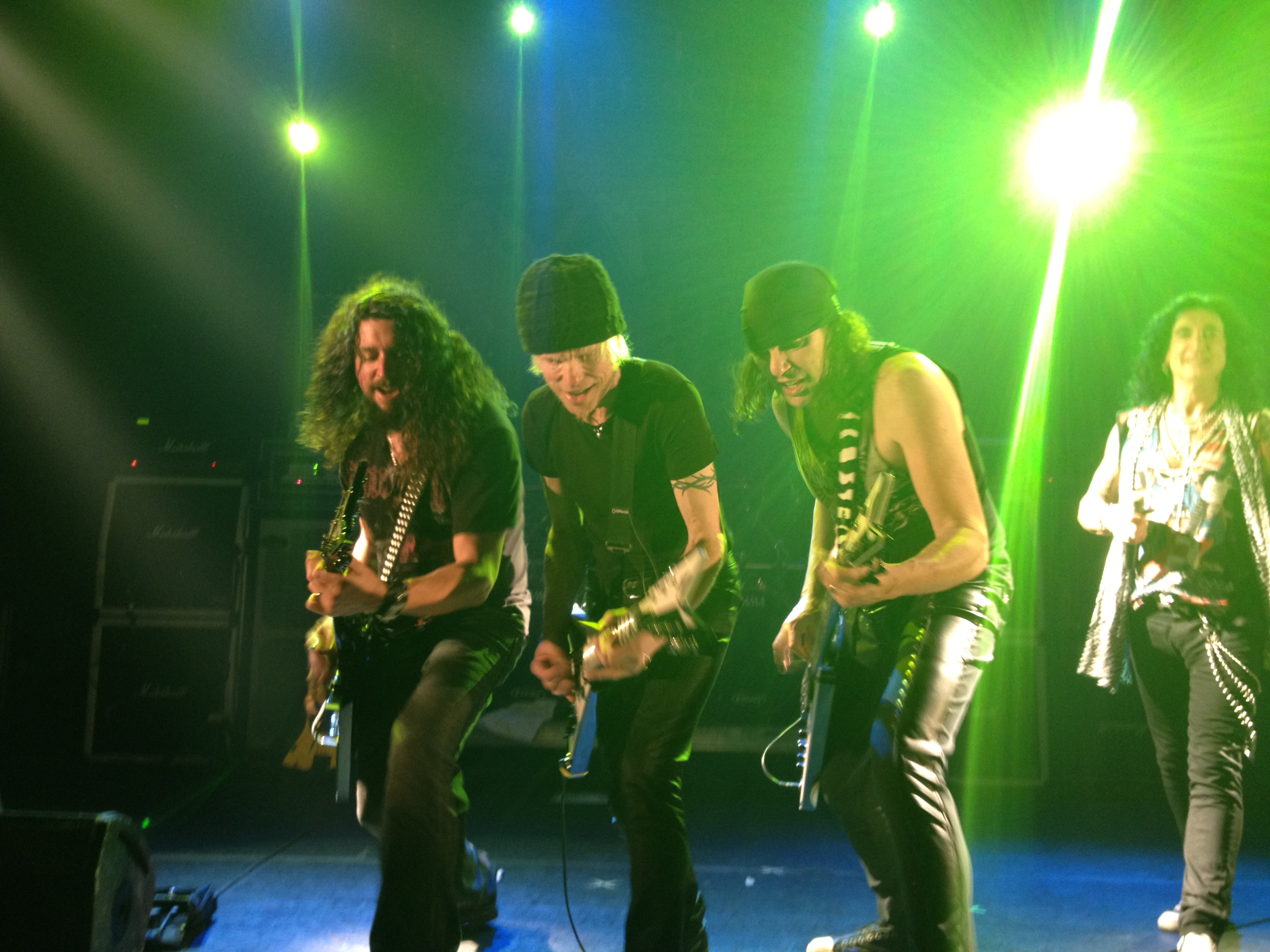
(left to right) Wayne Findlay, Michael Schenker, Elliott "Dean" Rubinson and Robin McAuley. (Pete Holmes not shown).

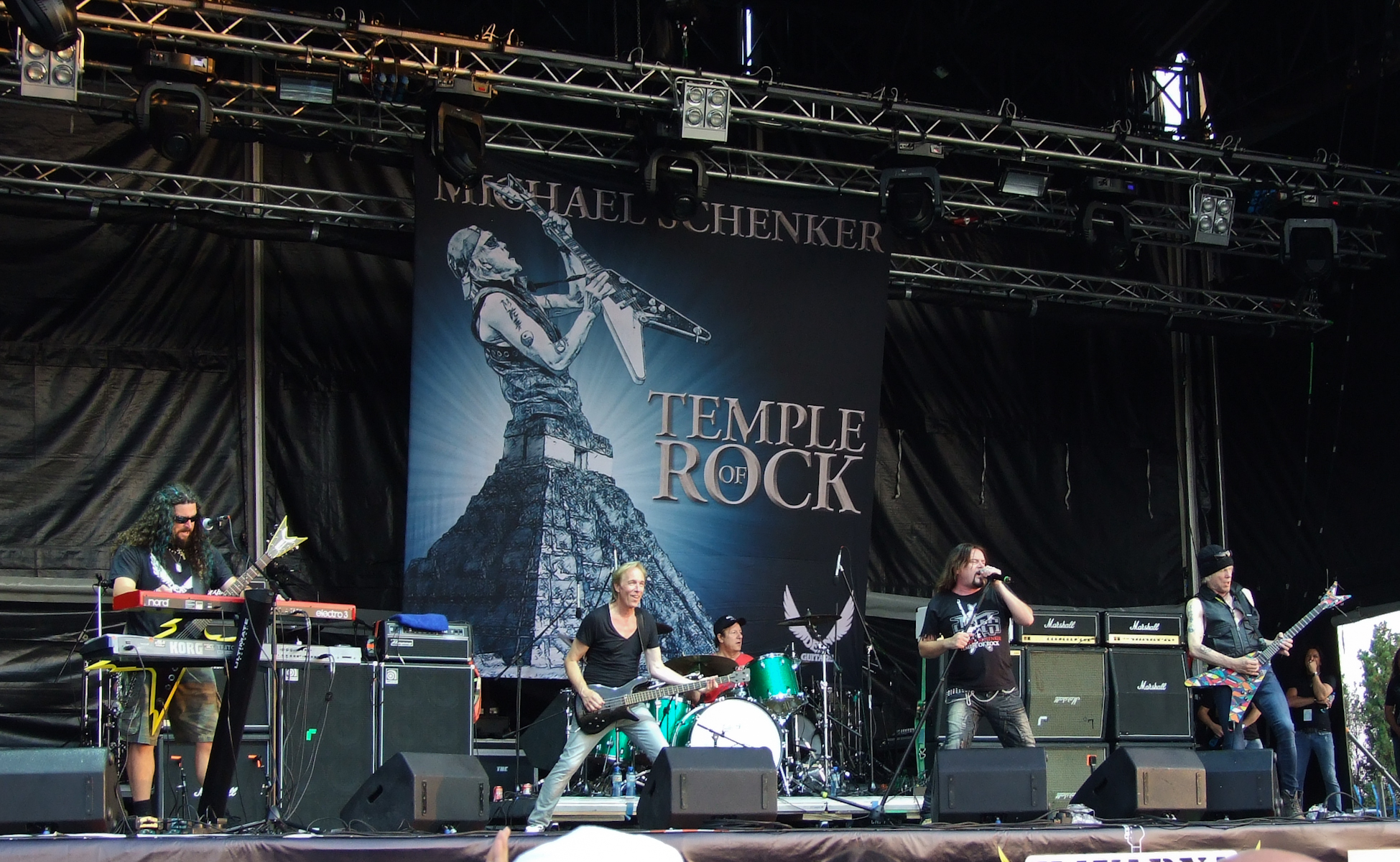
(left to right) Wayne Findlay, Francis Buchholz, Herman Rarebell, Doogie White and Michael Schenker.

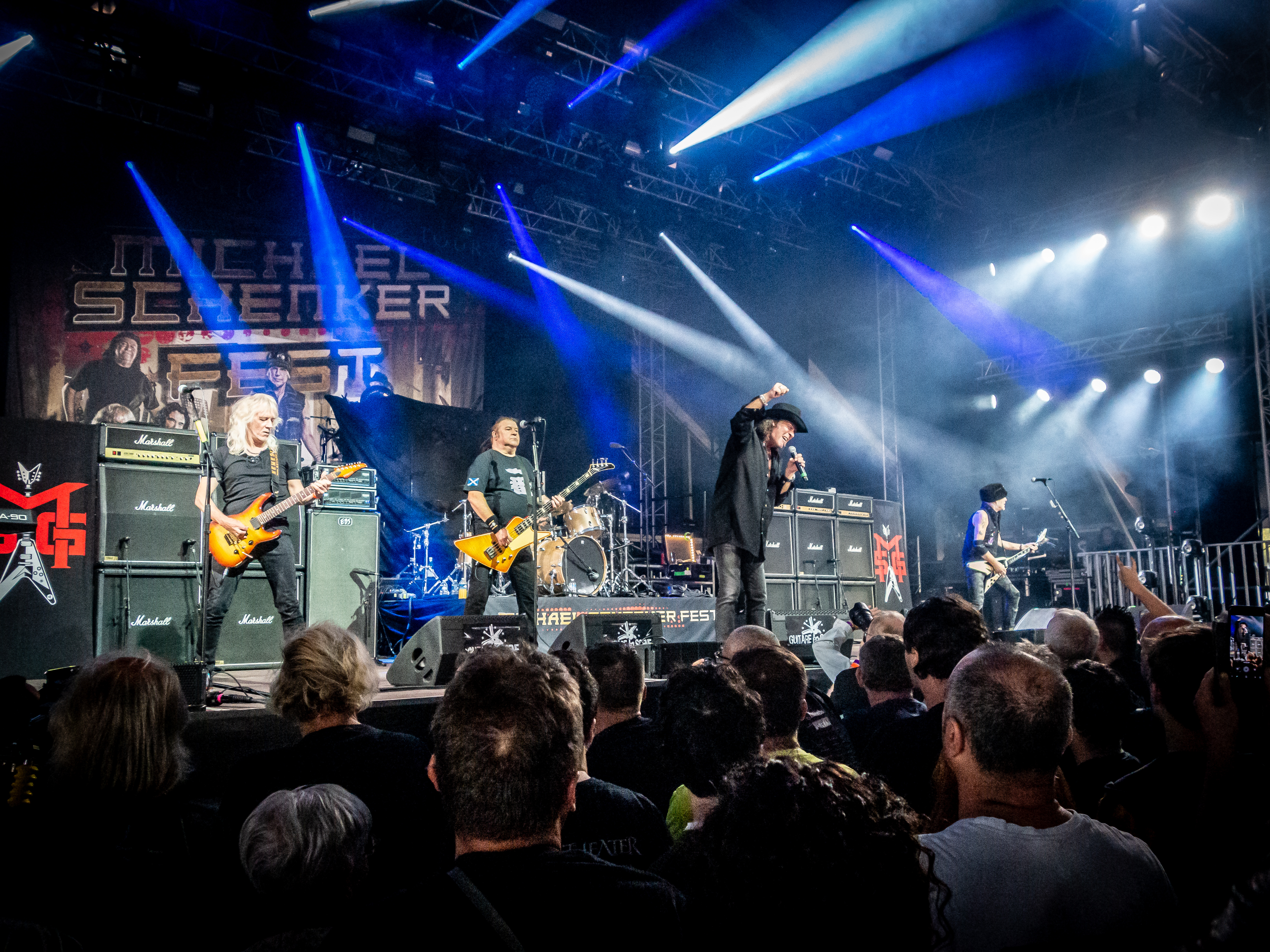
(left to right) Steve Mann, Chris Glen, Bodo Schopf (obscured), Gary Barden and Michael Schenker. (Graham Bonnet, Robin McAuley and Doogie White not shown).

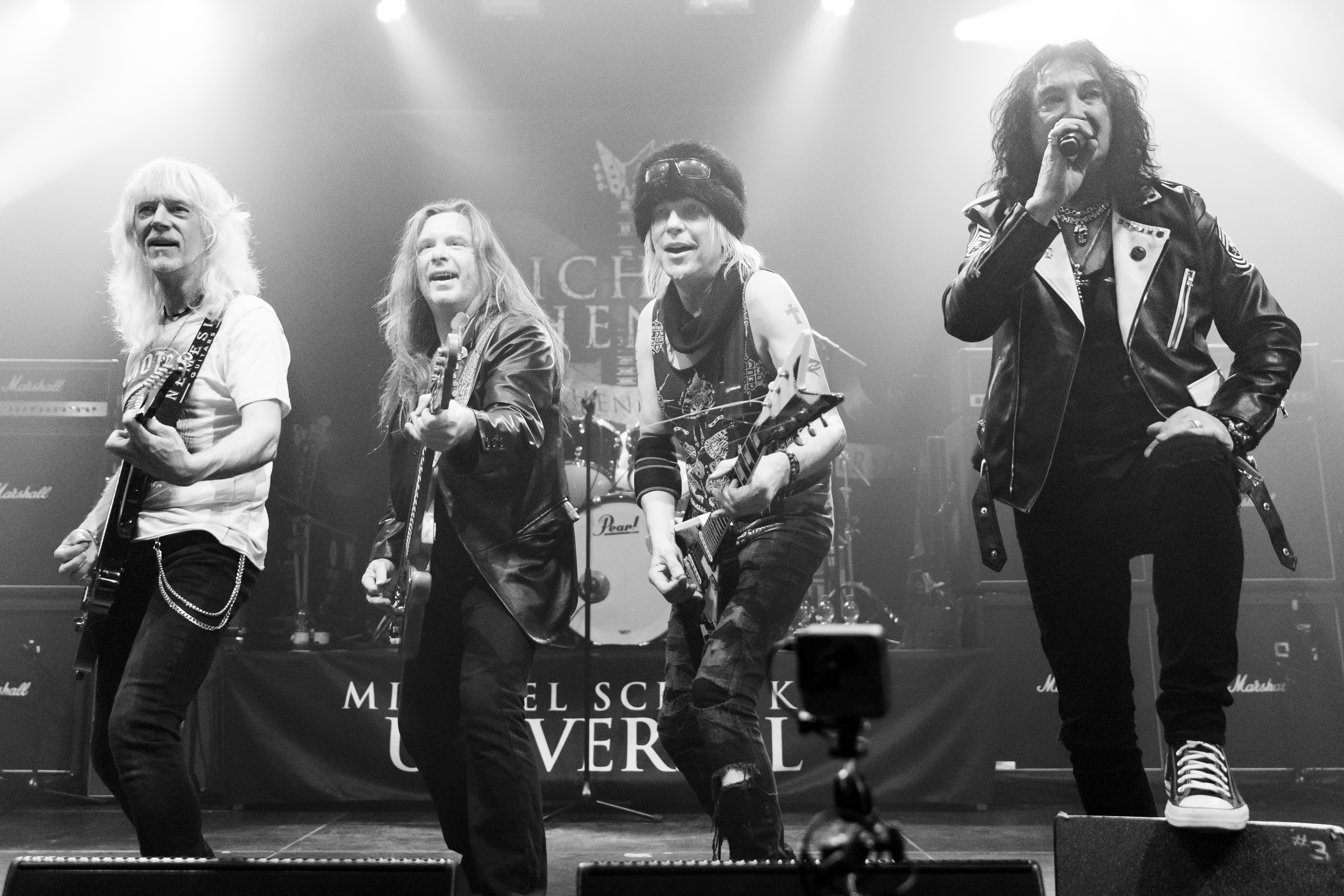
(left to right) Steve Mann, Barend Courbois, Bodo Schopf (obscured), Michael Schenker and Robin McAuley.

Four lineups of the Michael Schenker performing 2012, 2012, 2019 and 2022.

Michael Schenker is a German hard rock and heavy metal guitarist who began his career as the lead guitarist in Scorpions and UFO. Since his second departure from Scorpions in 1979, he has primarily focused on his own eponymous bands, namely the Michael Schenker Group (from 1979 to 1984, 1996 to 2011, and since 2020), the McAuley Schenker Group (from 1986 to 1993), Michael Schenker's Temple of Rock (from 2011 to 2016) and Michael Schenker Fest (from 2016 to 2020). The current members of his solo band are keyboardist and rhythm guitarist Steve Mann, bassist Barend Courbois, drummer Bodo Schopf, and vocalist Erik Grönwall.

== History ==
=== 1979–1984: The Michael Schenker Group ===
A few months after his second departure from Scorpions in April 1979, guitarist Michael Schenker formed the Michael Schenker Group with vocalist Gary Barden, bassist Billy Sheehan and drummer Denny Carmassi. The group rehearsed for around a month, producing a number of demo recordings, before the guitarist jammed with members of Aerosmith following the departure of lead guitarist Joe Perry. After hospitalising himself due to problems with drug addiction, Schenker reconvened with Barden in May 1980 to record the band's self-titled debut album, which featured session members Mo Foster on bass, Simon Phillips on drums and Don Airey on keyboards. For the subsequent supporting tour, Schenker and Barden recruited bassist Chris Glen, drummer Cozy Powell and keyboardist/rhythm guitarist Paul Raymond.

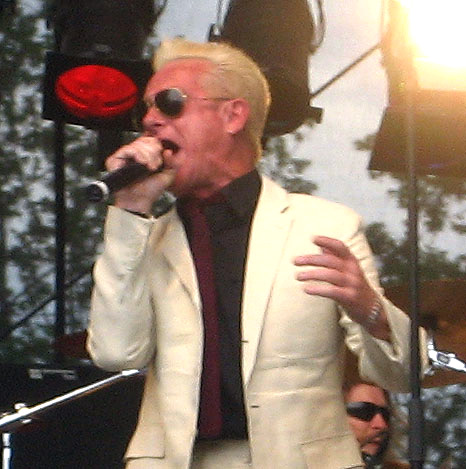
Former Rainbow frontman Graham Bonnet replaced Gary Barden in February 1982, but by August he had been fired.

The group's lineup remained intact for 1981's MSG, but splintered after the album's tour when Barden was fired by manager Peter Mensch. Former Rainbow frontman Graham Bonnet, who had worked with Powell in the past, was brought in the following February. In April, Powell also left MSG. He was replaced by Ted McKenna, a former bandmate of Glen's in The Sensational Alex Harvey Band, who played on Assault Attack. Prior to the album's release, Bonnet was sacked after drunkenly exposing himself on stage at a show in the UK, as well as revealing backstage rhythm guitarist Steve Casey to the crowd. The next day, he was immediately replaced by the returning Barden, who was brought in by Glen and McKenna in time for the band's performance at the Reading Festival a few days later. Keyboardist Andy Nye had also taken over from Raymond, who had also left a few months before, after session musician Tommy Eyre played keyboards to Assault Attack.

In August 1983, former Ted Nugent singer Derek St. Holmes joined MSG on rhythm guitar and vocals, although by the end of a tour in October 1983 he had also left. Former Argent guitarist John Verity filled in for the last dates of the run. Glen also left in February 1984 due to disagreements over royalty payments, with former Balance bassist Dennis Feldman taking his place. By April, Barden had also been fired for a second time, due to his increasing alcoholism. He was replaced later by Ray Kennedy, who left after the completion of the latest touring cycle in August. Before the end of the year, Nye and McKenna also left MSG, leaving Schenker to rebuild the group. However, he decided against recruiting new members and instead disbanded his eponymous group and returned to Germany.

=== 1986–1993: McAuley Schenker Group ===
After Michael Schenker Group entered a hiatus in 1984, the eponymous guitarist claimed that he wanted "to experience a partnership ... someone to make decisions with", instead of a band centred solely around himself. In April 1986, he found a vocalist in former Grand Prix vocalist Robin McAuley, with whom he formed a new band. The pair recruited bassist Rocky Newton, drummer Bodo Schopf and rhythm guitarist/keyboardist Mitch Perry to record the group's debut album Perfect Timing, which was released the following year. Steve Mann preceded Perry on keyboards and rhythm guitar in the lineup, but left in mid-1987. During the recording of their debut album, Schenker renamed the band the McAuley Schenker Group, a decision with which McAuley disagreed on, due to the original group's existing recognition. Perry remained for the Perfect Timing touring cycle into 1988.

Mann returned to the McAuley Schenker Group after the Perfect Timing tour, and the band released their next album Save Yourself in 1989. The group took a break in 1990 as Schenker toured and recorded with supergroup Contraband, before returning in 1991 with M.S.G., featuring bassist Jeff Pilson, drummer James Kottak and keyboardist Jesse Harms. McAuley and Schenker remained the only official members of the group, however, and completed an acoustic tour in promotion of the release between November 1991 and March 1992. The tour featured rhythm guitarist Spencer Sercombe. The duo released Nightmare: The Acoustic M.S.G. and "Unplugged" Live in 1992, but by early 1993, the band had disbanded as Schenker left the band, his record label and his management.

=== 1996–2006: Second MSG tenure ===
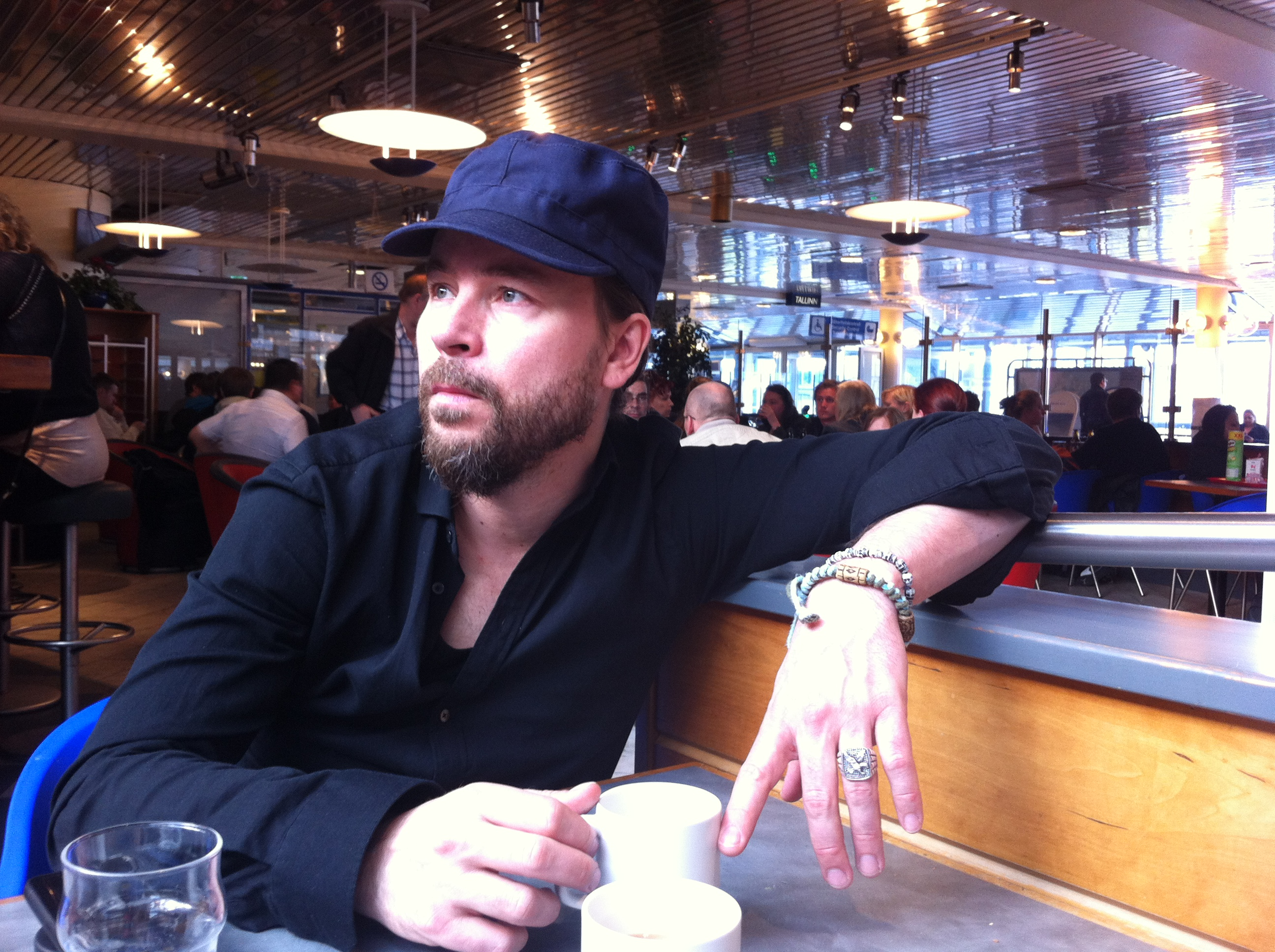
The Michael Schenker Group reformed in 1996 with new vocalist Leif Sundin.

After spending a second tenure in UFO, Schenker reformed the Michael Schenker Group in 1996 and released Written in the Sand, featuring new vocalist Leif Sundin, bassist Barry Sparks and drummer Shane Gaalaas. For the subsequent promotional tour, Seth Bernstein joined on keyboards and rhythm guitar. David VanLanding substituted for Sundin on the opening US leg of the tour, and remained for Japanese dates recorded for The Michael Schenker Story Live. The group took a break again as Schenker completed a third stint in UFO, before returning in early 1998 to join the G3 tour with a lineup of Barden, VanLanding, Gaalaas, Bernstein and bassist Jeff Kollman. Gaalaas and Bernstein remained for the 1999 album The Unforgiven, which featured vocalist Kelly Keeling and bassist John Onder.

For the tour in support of The Unforgiven, Sparks returned on bass, Keith Slack joined as a second vocalist, and Wayne Findlay replaced Bernstein. During this tour, three performances at The Edge in Palo Alto in May 1999 were recorded and released as the double live CD The Unforgiven World Tour also in the same year. After the end of the tour in 2000, Schenker returned to UFO for a fourth time. During the year, he also worked on three solo albums. By the time MSG returned in early 2001, the group featured a new lineup of vocalist Chris Logan, bassist Rev Jones and drummer Jeff Martin. After the recording of Be Aware of Scorpions, Martin left the band due to problems stemming from Schenker's alcohol abuse and aggressive behavior. He was replaced by Jeremy Colson, who was revealed in November. The group remained largely inactive during 2002, as Schenker recorded Sharks with UFO, and released the second and third volumes of his Thank You series. The guitarist was also due to take part in Uli Jon Roth's Legends of Rock tour in Europe at the end of the year, but was forced to pull out after dislocating his shoulder.

In April 2003, MSG announced a new lineup including Logan, Colson and bassist Stuart Hamm, who recorded the album Arachnophobiac. For the subsequent tour, Schenker and Logan were joined by the returning Findlay and Jones, plus new drummer Pete Holmes. Logan remained until November 2004, when he left the band after being injured in a fight with Jones. He was replaced by former frontman Leif Sundin. Early the next year, Schenker collaborated with Bob Kulick on Heavy Hitters, an album of cover versions featuring various guest musicians. Around the same time, both Jones and Holmes left MSG following "continuous cancelled tour dates and bad management decisions". Schenker and Findlay recorded MSG's 25th anniversary album Tales of Rock'n'Roll with new vocalist Jari Tiura, UFO bassist Pete Way and former drummer Jeff Martin as well as all former frontmen of the group: Barden, Bonnet, McAuley, Sundin, Keeling and Logan made their guest appearances on the album. Jones and Holmes returned for 2006 tour dates.

=== 2006–2011: Barden's third MSG stint ===
After several legs of touring in promotion of Tales of Rock 'n' Roll, Schenker announced in September 2006 that MSG was "finished", blaming Tiura for refusing to continue touring. Despite this, the same lineup of the band returned for a run of shows in Japan and Thailand in November, although a number of shows were cancelled or postponed due to Schenker's ongoing "health issues". Jones later criticised Schenker as a "talentless guitar player", claiming that he and Tiura had left earlier in the year due to the guitarist's inability to pay them for touring duties, before they returned to complete the Asian dates. In January 2007, after Jones and Holmes had left, bassist Frank Rummler and drummer Bodo Schopf were announced as new members of MSG's touring lineup. The group toured for several months, but were forced to cancel several dates later in the year for various reasons, including health and operational issues. In December, Tiura was replaced by original MSG singer Gary Barden.

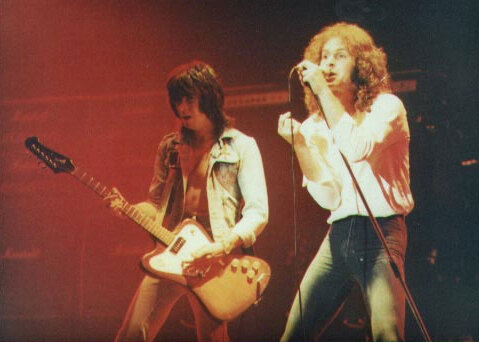
Original MSG vocalist Gary Barden rejoined the band in December 2007.

MSG's next album, 2008's In the Midst of Beauty, featured contributions from drummer Simon Phillips, keyboardist Don Airey (both of whom played on the band's debut album in 1980) and veteran bassist Neil Murray. For the album's touring cycle, Schenker, Barden and Findlay were due to be joined by former MSG members Chris Glen on bass and Ted McKenna on drums. However, by the time the tour started in June, McKenna had been replaced by former AC/DC drummer Chris Slade. For a US tour starting in March 2009, Robbie Crane was set to replace Glen; however, the tour was later postponed until June, and the lineup changed to feature Rev Jones and Pete Holmes in place of Glen and Slade, respectively. For South American dates in July, Dean Guitars owner Elliott "Dean" Rubinson took over from Jones, while Slade returned in place of Holmes, for European dates in September, Glen and Holmes returned, and in December, Slade rejoined.

In January 2010, MSG completed a short Japanese tour to mark the band's 30th anniversary, enlisting In the Midst of Beauty contributors Neil Murray and Simon Phillips. Glen and Slade returned for European dates starting in May, with Holmes taking over on drums in July; later US dates featured Rubinson and drummer Carmine Appice, the former of whom was replaced by Jones in August. MSG performed at the NAMM Show in January 2011 with Robin McAuley on vocals and Rubinson returning on bass. For a South American tour the next month, David VanLanding returned as the group's frontman. In June, Schenker performed one show in the Netherlands with Barden, Findlay, Glen and Slade and in August three Italy shows with Barden, Findlay, Rubinson and Holmes.

=== 2011–2016: Michael Schenker's Temple of Rock ===
In July 2011, Schenker released a solo album entitled Temple of Rock. This CD featured a core lineup of producer Michael Voss on vocals, former UFO bassist Pete Way, former Scorpions drummer Herman Rarebell and long time MSG member Wayne Findlay on keyboards; additional contributors included former MSG members Robin McAuley, Paul Raymond and Chris Glen, plus a range of guest musicians. Voss, Rarebell and Findlay remained for initial tour dates around the album's release, with Elliott "Dean" Rubinson brought in on bass. Schenker's new Temple of Rock (TOR) band returned in February 2012, with Findlay and Rubinson, joined by vocalist Robin McAuley and drummer Pete Holmes. For a Japanese tour the following month, Voss and Rarebell rejoined the group, and by the time of the group's first European tour a couple of months later, the lineup had settled with former Rainbow vocalist Doogie White and former Scorpions bassist Francis Buchholz.

After another American tour with Rev Jones and Pete Holmes in late 2012, TOR returned in 2013 with the lineup of Schenker, White, Findlay, Buchholz and Rarebell, releasing the studio album Bridge the Gap late in the year. The first leg of the album's promotional tour saw Buchholz and Rarebell replaced again by Jones and Holmes, before the former Scorpions rhythm section returned, for the rest of the group's tenure.

=== 2016–2020: Michael Schenker Fest ===
In March 2016, it was announced that Schenker would tour with a group dubbed Michael Schenker Fest (MSF), featuring MSG vocalists Gary Barden, Graham Bonnet and Robin McAuley, alongside former MASG keyboardist/guitarist Steve Mann, and former MSG and SAHB rhythm section Chris Glen (bass) and MSG drummer Ted McKenna. For their first show at Sweden Rock Festival that June, Leif Sundin from MSG was also included as a fourth vocalist. The group toured with three vocalists until early 2018, when Temple of Rock singer Doogie White was added. In January 2019, during the recording of Revelation, the follow-up album to their first studio CD Resurrection from 2018, McKenna died during elective surgery. The album was later completed with stand-in Simon Phillips, before Bodo Schopf took over upon its release (Schopf only played drums on three songs on Revelation). The group continued touring until January 2020, with their final shows on the 70000 Tons of Metal cruise without White. McAuley was forced to pull out of the shows after contracting sepsis.

=== Since 2020: MSG with Ronnie Romero and return of McAuley ===
After several months away, Schenker announced a new MSG album, Immortal, featuring a lineup of Rainbow frontman Ronnie Romero on vocals, Steve Mann on keyboards/rhythm guitar, Barry Sparks on bass and Bodo Schopf on drums. In July 2021, then Blind Guardian touring bassist Barend Courbois joined MSG's lineup. From April to May 2022, former vocalist Robin McAuley rejoined the band and handled vocals instead of Romero.

In June 2023, Romero confirmed that he was no longer a member of the group. He was subsequently replaced, by a returning McAuley. in April 2025, former Skid Row frontman Erik Gronwall took over as lead singer from McAuley.

In January 2026, Schenker will do a Japanese tour with Gronwall, as well as prolific keyboardist Derek Sherinian and former collaborators Brian Tichy (drums), Barry Sparks (bass) and Michael Voss (guitar, vocals). All of whom played on his 2024 album My Years with UFO.

== Official members ==
=== Current band members ===
Image	Name	Years active	Instruments	Release contributions
	Michael Schenker	1979–present	lead guitar; backing vocals	all releases
	Steve Mann	1986–1987; 1988–1991; 2016–present	keyboards; rhythm and occasional lead guitar; backing vocals	Perfect Timing (1987); Save Yourself (1989); M.S.G. (1991); all Michael Schenker Fest (MSF) releases; Immortal (2021); Universal (2022)
	Bodo Schopf	1986–1991; 2007–2008; 2019–present	drums	Perfect Timing (1987); Save Yourself (1989); Immortal (2021); Universal (2022)
	Barend Courbois	2021–present	bass; backing vocals	Universal (2022)
	Erik Grönwall	2025–present	lead vocals	My Years with UFO (2024)

=== Former band members ===
Image	Name	Years active	Instruments	Release contributions
	Gary Barden	1979–1982; 1982–1984; 1998; 2007–2010; 2011; 2016–2020	lead and backing vocals	all MSG releases from The Michael Schenker Group (1980) to Rock Will Never Die (1984) except Assault Attack (1982); BBC Radio One Live in Concert (1995); Heavy Hitters (2005); Tales of Rock'n'Roll (2006); In the Midst of Beauty (2008); The 30th Anniversary Concert: Live in Tokyo (2010); all MSF releases; Immortal (2021)
	Billy Sheehan	1979	bass	The Michael Schenker Group 1979 demos (2009)
	Denny Carmassi	1979	drums	The Michael Schenker Group 1979 demos (2009)
	Simon Phillips	1980 (session); 2007–2008 (session); 2010 (touring); 2011 (session); 2019 (session)	drums	The Michael Schenker Group (1980); In the Midst of Beauty (2008); The 30th Anniversary Concert: Live in Tokyo (2010); Immortal (2021)
	Chris Glen	1980–1984; 2008; 2009; 2010; 2011; 2016–2020	bass; backing vocals	all MSG releases from MSG (1981) to Rock Will Never Die (1984); BBC Radio One Live in Concert (1995); The Michael Schenker Group 1980 live tracks (2009); Temple of Rock (2011); all MSF releases
	Cozy Powell	1980–1982 (died 1998)	drums	MSG (1981); One Night at Budokan (1982); The Michael Schenker Group 1980 live tracks (2009)
	Paul Raymond	1980–1982 (studio guest 2011) (died 2019)	keyboards; rhythm guitar; backing vocals	MSG (1981); One Night at Budokan (1982); The Michael Schenker Group 1980 live tracks (2009); Temple of Rock (2011)
	Graham Bonnet	1982; 2016–2020	lead and backing vocals	Assault Attack (1982); Tales of Rock'n'Roll (2006); all MSF releases
	Ted McKenna	1982–1984; 2009; 2016–2019 (until his death)	drums	Assault Attack (1982); Built to Destroy (1983); Rock Will Never Die (1984); BBC Radio One Live in Concert (1995); Live: Tokyo International Forum Hall A (2017); Resurrection (2018)
	Andy Nye	1982–1984	keyboards; backing vocals	Built to Destroy (1983); Rock Will Never Die (1984); BBC Radio One Live in Concert (1995)
	Derek St. Holmes	1983	rhythm guitar; backing and occasional lead vocals	Built to Destroy (US version) (1983); Rock Will Never Die (1984)
	Dennis Feldman	1984	bass	none – live performances and demos only
	Ray Kennedy	1984 (died 2014)	lead vocals	none – live performances and demos only
	Robin McAuley	1986–1993; 2011; 2012; 2016–2020; 2022; 2023–2025	lead and backing vocals; tambourine	all MASG releases; Tales of Rock'n'Roll (2006); By Invitation Only (2011); all MSF releases; Temple of Rock (2011); Immortal (2021)
	Rocky Newton	1986–1991	bass; backing vocals	Perfect Timing (1987); Save Yourself (1989); M.S.G. (1991)
	Mitch Perry	1987–1988	rhythm and occasional lead guitar; keyboards; backing vocals	Perfect Timing (1987)
	Leif Sundin	1995–1997; 2004–2005; 2007–2008	lead vocals; rhythm guitar	Written in the Sand (1996); The Michael Schenker Story Live (1997); Tales of Rock'n'Roll (2006)
	Shane Gaalaas	1996–2000	drums; acoustic guitar	all MSG releases from Written in the Sand (1996) to The Unforgiven World Tour (1999)
	Barry Sparks	1996–1997; 1999–2000; 2020 (session)	bass; backing vocals; occasional acoustic guitar	Written in the Sand (1996); The Michael Schenker Story Live (1997); The Unforgiven World Tour (1999); Immortal (2021)
	Seth Bernstein	1996–1999	keyboards; rhythm guitar; backing vocals	The Michael Schenker Story Live (1997); The Unforgiven (1999)
	David VanLanding	1996–1998; 2011; 2012 (died 2015)	lead vocals; percussion	The Michael Schenker Story Live (1997)
	Kelly Keeling	1998–2000	lead vocals	The Unforgiven (1999); The Unforgiven World Tour (1999)
	Jeff Kollman	1998	bass	none – live performances only
	Wayne Findlay	1999–2016	keyboards; rhythm and occasional lead guitar; backing vocals	The Unforgiven World Tour (1999); World Wide Live (2004); Tales of Rock'n'Roll (2006); The 30th Anniversary Concert: Live in Tokyo (2010); all TOR releases; Resurrection (2018)
	Keith Slack	1999–2000	lead vocals	The Unforgiven World Tour (1999)
	Chris Logan	2001–2004	lead vocals	Be Aware of Scorpions (2001); Arachnophobiac (2003); World Wide Live (2004); Tales of Rock'n'Roll (2006)
	Rev Jones	2001–2005; 2005–2006; 2009; 2010; 2012; 2014	bass; backing vocals	Be Aware of Scorpions (2001); World Wide Live (2004)
	Jeff Martin	2001; 2005 (session)	drums; percussion; backing and occasional lead vocals	Be Aware of Scorpions (2001); Tales of Rock'n'Roll (2006)
	Jeremy Colson	2001–2003	drums	Arachnophobiac (2003)
	Pete Holmes	2003–2005; 2005–2006; 2009; 2010; 2011; 2012; 2014	drums	World Wide Live (2004)
	Jari Tiura	2006–2007	lead vocals	Tales of Rock'n'Roll (2006)
	Frank Rummler	2007	bass	none – live performances only
	Neil Murray	2007–2008 (session); 2010 (touring) (studio guest in 2011)	bass	In the Midst of Beauty (2008); The 30th Anniversary Concert: Live in Tokyo (2010); Temple of Rock (2011)
	Chris Slade	2008–2009; 2009; 2010; 2011	drums	Temple of Rock (2011)
	Elliott "Dean" Rubinson	2009; 2010; 2011; 2011–2012; 2012 (died 2017)	bass	Temple of Rock (2011); Live in Europe (2012)
	Carmine Appice	2010–2011	drums	Heavy Hitters (2005); Temple of Rock (2011); My Years with UFO (2024)
	Herman Rarebell	2011; 2012; 2013; 2014–2016	drums	all Temple of Rock (TOR) releases
	Michael Voss	2011; 2012	lead vocals; rhythm and lead guitar	Temple of Rock (2011); Temple of Rock: Live in Europe (2012); Resurrection (2018); Immortal (2021); My Years with UFO (2024)
	Doogie White	2012; 2013–2016; 2018–2020 (studio guest in 2011)	lead and backing vocals	Temple of Rock (2011); all TOR releases; Resurrection (2018); Revelation (2019); Immortal (2021)
	Francis Buchholz	2012; 2013; 2014–2016	bass	all TOR releases from Temple of Rock: Live in Europe (2012) to On a Mission: Live in Madrid (2016)
	Ronnie Romero	2020–2022; 2022–2023	lead vocals	Immortal (2021)

== Other contributors ==
=== Session musicians ===
Image	Name	Years active	Instruments	Release contributions
	Don Airey	1980; 2007–2008; 2011 (guest in 2011)	keyboards; organ	The Michael Schenker Group (1980); In the Midst of Beauty (2008); Temple of Rock (2011)
	Mo Foster	1980 (died 2023)	bass	The Michael Schenker Group (1980)
	Stephen Stills	1981 (guests)	backing vocals	MSG (1981)
	Billy Nicholls	1981 (guests)	backing vocals	MSG (1981)
	Tommy Eyre	1982 (died 2001)	keyboards	Assault Attack (1982)
	Emi Canyn	1989 (guests)	additional backing vocals	Save Yourself (1989)
	Donna McDaniel	1989 (guests)	additional backing vocals	Save Yourself (1989)
	Dave Amato	1989 (guests)	additional backing vocals	Save Yourself (1989)
	Chris Post	1989 (guests)	additional backing vocals	Save Yourself (1989)
	Jeff Pilson	1991	bass	M.S.G. (1991)
	James Kottak	1991 (died 2024)	drums	M.S.G. (1991)
	Jesse Harms	1991	keyboards	M.S.G. (1991)
	Claude Gaudette	1996	keyboards	Written in the Sand (1996)
	John Onder	1998	bass	The Unforgiven (1999)
	Jesse Bradman	1999 (guests)	keyboards; backing vocals	The Unforgiven (1999)
	Louis Maldonado	1999 (guests)	rhythm guitar; backing vocals	The Unforgiven (1999)
	Ralph Patlan	2001 (guest)	percussion; bass guitar; backing vocals	Be Aware of Scorpions (2001)
	Jeff Watson	2003	lead guitar	Arachnophobiac (2003)
	Stuart Hamm	2003	bass	Arachnophobiac (2003)
	Jeff Okolowicz	2003	bass	Arachnophobiac (2003)
	Pete Way	2005; 2011 (died 2020)	bass	Tales of Rock'n'Roll (2006); Temple of Rock (2011)
	Rudolf Schenker	2011 (guests)	additional guitar	Temple of Rock (2011)
	Michael Amott	2011 (guests)	additional guitar	Temple of Rock (2011)
	Leslie West	2011 (guests)	additional guitar	Temple of Rock (2011)
	Kirk Hammett	2018 (guest)	lead guitar	Resurrection (2018)
	Derek Sherinian	2021 (guests)	keyboards	Immortal (2021)
	Ralf Scheepers	2021 (guests)	lead vocals	Immortal (2021)
	Michael Kiske	2022 (guests)	lead vocals	Universal (2022)
	Tony Carey	2022 (guests)	keyboards	Universal (2022)
	Bob Daisley	2022 (guests)	bass	Universal (2022)
	Bobby Rondinelli	2022 (guests)	drums	Universal (2022)

=== Touring musicians ===
Image	Name	Years active	Instruments	Details
	Hugh McKenna	1982 (died 2019)	backing vocals	McKenna, the cousin of then-drummer Ted, performed backing vocals at one show in August 1982.
	Steve Casey	1982	rhythm guitar	Casey performed rhythm guitar at a handful of shows in 1982 following Paul Raymond's departure.
	John Verity	1983	rhythm guitar	Verity filled in on rhythm guitar at the end of a UK tour following the departure of Derek St. Holmes.
	Terry Slesser	1983–1984	backing vocals	Slesser performed at European shows in late 1983, and at Japanese and US shows in early 1984.
	Spencer Sercombe	1991–1992	rhythm guitar; backing vocals	Sercombe performed with McAuley and Schenker on their acoustic tour between 1991 and 1992, and appeared on "Unplugged" Live (1992)

=== Unabridged members ===
Image	Name	Years active	Instruments	Details
	Robbie Crane	2009	bass; backing vocals	Crane was due to perform with MSG on a US tour starting in March 2009, but it was postponed.
	Brian Tichy	2011	drums	Tichy was due to perform at the 2011 NAMM Show, however it went ahead with Carmine Appice. Tichy also appeared on Temple of Rock (2011) Immortal (2021) and Universal (2022)

== Timeline ==
=== Recording timeline ===
Role	Band	Vocals	Lead guitar	Rhythm guitar	Keyboards	Bass	Drums
The Michael Schenker Group (1980)	The Michael Schenker Group	Gary Barden	Michael Schenker	Michael Schenker	Don Airey (session)	Mo Foster (session)	Simon Phillips (session)
MSG (1981)	The Michael Schenker Group	Gary Barden	Michael Schenker	Paul Raymond	Paul Raymond	Chris Glen	Cozy Powell
Assault Attack (1982)	The Michael Schenker Group	Graham Bonnet	Michael Schenker	Michael Schenker	Tommy Eyre (session)	Chris Glen	Ted McKenna
Built to Destroy (1983)	The Michael Schenker Group	Gary Barden, Derek St. Holmes	Michael Schenker	Michael Schenker	Andy Nye	Chris Glen	Ted McKenna
Perfect Timing (1987)	McAuley Schenker Group	Robin McAuley	Michael Schenker	Mitch Perry, Steve Mann (session)	Steve Mann (session)	Rocky Newton	Bodo Schopf
Save Yourself (1989)	McAuley Schenker Group	Robin McAuley	Michael Schenker	Steve Mann	Steve Mann	Rocky Newton	Bodo Schopf
M.S.G. (1991)	McAuley Schenker Group	Robin McAuley	Michael Schenker	Michael Schenker	Jesse Harms, Steve Mann (session)	Jeff Pilson	James Kottak
Written in the Sand (1996)	Michael Schenker Group	Leif Sundin	Michael Schenker	Michael Schenker	Claude Gaudette (session)	Barry Sparks	Shane Gaalaas
The Unforgiven (1999)	Michael Schenker Group	Kelly Keeling	Michael Schenker	Michael Schenker, Seth Bernstein, Louis Maldonado (session)	Seth Bernstein, Jesse Bradman (session)	John Onder	Shane Gaalaas
Be Aware of Scorpions (2001)	Michael Schenker Group	Chris Logan, Jeff Martin	Michael Schenker	Michael Schenker	no-one	Reverend Jones	Jeff Martin
Arachnophobiac (2003)	Michael Schenker Group	Chris Logan	Michael Schenker, Jeff Watson	Michael Schenker	no-one	Stuart Hamm	Jeremy Colson
Tales of Rock'n'Roll (2006)	Michael Schenker Group	Jari Tiura, various musicians (Note: Other singers on this album are Gary Barden, Graham Bonnet, Robin McAuley, Kelly Keeling, Leif Sundin and Chris Logan. All are former members and credited as session members.)	Michael Schenker	Wayne Findlay	Wayne Findlay	Pete Way	Jeff Martin
In the Midst of Beauty (2008)	Michael Schenker Group	Gary Barden	Michael Schenker	Michael Schenker	Don Airey	Neil Murray	Simon Phillips
Heavy Hitters (2005)	Michael Schenker Group	various musicians (Note: singers on these albums were; Joe Lynn Turner, Leslie West, Jeff Scott Soto, Tim "Ripper" Owens, Mark Slaughter, Tommy Shaw, Gary Barden, Robin McAuley, Paul Di'Anno, Sebastian Bach and Jeff Pilson)	Michael Schenker	Michael Schenker, Bob Kulick, Pete Fletcher	Jeremy Rubolino	various musicians (Note: Bassists on these albums are: Tony Franklin, Jeff Pilson, Rudy Sarzo, Marco Mendoza, Mike Inez, Tony Levin, Chuck Wright and Phil Soussan.)	various musicians (Note: Drummers on these albums were: Aynsley Dunbar, Simon Wright, Brent Chassen, Mike Baird, Vinny Appice, Eric Singer and Brian Tichy.)
By Invitation Only (2008)	Michael Schenker Group	various musicians	Michael Schenker	Michael Schenker, Bob Kulick, Pete Fletcher	Jeremy Rubolino	various musicians	various musicians
Gipsy Lady (2009)	Schenker Barden Acoustic Project	Gary Barden	Michael Schenker	Michael Voss	Michael Voss	Michael Voss	no-one
Temple of Rock (2011)	Schenker's Temple of Rock	Michael Voss (Note: Also William Shatner, Robin McAuley and Doogie White)	Michael Schenker	Michael Schenker (Note: Also Rudolf Schenker, Michael Amott and Leslie West)	Wayne Findlay (Note: Also Don Airey and Paul Raymond.)	Pete Way (Note: Also Chris Glen, Neil Murray and Elliott "Dean" Rubinson)	Herman Rarebell (Note: Also Carmine Appice, Simon Philips, Chris Slade and Brian Tichy.)
Bridge the Gap (2013)	Schenker's Temple of Rock	Doogie White	Michael Schenker	Wayne Findlay	Wayne Findlay	Francis Buchholz	Herman Rarebell
Spirit on a Mission (2015)	Schenker's Temple of Rock	Doogie White	Michael Schenker	Wayne Findlay, Michael Schenker	Wayne Findlay	Francis Buchholz	Herman Rarebell
Resurrection (2018)	Michael Schenker Fest	Gary Barden, Graham Bonnet, Robin McAuley, Doogie White	Michael Schenker, Kirk Hammett	Michael Schenker, Steve Mann	Steve Mann, Wayne Findlay	Chris Glen	Ted McKenna
Revelation (2019)	Michael Schenker Fest	Gary Barden, Graham Bonnet, Robin McAuley, Doogie White	Michael Schenker	Michael Schenker, Steve Mann	Steve Mann	Chris Glen	Bodo Schopf, Simon Phillips
Immortal (2021)	Michael Schenker Group	Ronnie Romero, Joe Lynn Turner, Michael Voss, Ralf Scheepers	Michael Schenker	Michael Schenker	Steve Mann, Derek Sherinian	Barry Sparks	Bodo Schopf, Simon Phillips, Brian Tichy
Universal (2022)	Michael Schenker Group	Ronnie Romero, Michael Kiske, Ralf Scheepers	Michael Schenker	Michael Schenker	Steve Mann, Tony Carey, Barry Sparks	Bob Daisley, Barry Sparks, Barend Courbois	Bodo Schopf, Simon Phillips, Brian Tichy, Bobby Rondinelli

== Line-ups ==
Period	Members	Releases
September – October 1979 (Michael Schenker Group)	Michael Schenker – guitars; Gary Barden – vocals; Billy Sheehan – bass; Denny Carmassi – drums	The Michael Schenker Group demo (1979)
May – July 1980 (Michael Schenker Group)	Michael Schenker – guitars; Gary Barden – vocals; Mo Foster – bass (session); Simon Phillips – drums (session); Don Airey – keyboards (session)	The Michael Schenker Group (1980)
August 1980 – January 1982 (Michael Schenker Group)	Michael Schenker – lead guitar; Gary Barden – lead vocals; Paul Raymond – keyboards, rhythm guitar, backing vocals; Chris Glen – bass, backing vocals; Cozy Powell – drums	MSG (1981); One Night at Budokan (1982)
February – April 1982 (Michael Schenker Group)	Michael Schenker – guitars; Graham Bonnet – lead vocals; Chris Glen – bass, backing vocals; Cozy Powell – drums	none – rehearsals only
April – August 1982 (Michael Schenker Group)	Michael Schenker – guitars; Graham Bonnet – lead vocals; Chris Glen – bass, backing vocals; Ted McKenna – drums; Tommy Eyre – keyboards (session)	Assault Attack (1982)
August 1982 (Michael Schenker Group)	Michael Schenker – lead guitar; Graham Bonnet – lead vocals; Chris Glen – bass, backing vocals; Ted McKenna – drums; Andy Nye – keyboards, backing vocals; Steve Casey – rhythm guitar (touring)	none – one live performance only
August 1982 – August 1983 (Michael Schenker Group)	Michael Schenker – guitars; Gary Barden – lead vocals; Chris Glen – bass, backing vocals; Ted McKenna – drums; Andy Nye – keyboards, backing vocals	Built to Destroy (1983); BBC Radio One Live in Concert (1995)
August – October 1983 (Michael Schenker Group)	Michael Schenker – lead guitar; Gary Barden – lead vocals; Derek St. Holmes – rhythm guitar, vocals; Chris Glen – bass, backing vocals; Ted McKenna – drums; Andy Nye – keyboards, backing vocals	"Still Love That Little Devil" (US version) (1983); Rock Will Never Die (1984)
October 1983 – December 1983 (Michael Schenker Group)	Michael Schenker – lead guitar; Gary Barden – lead vocals; Chris Glen – bass, backing vocals; Ted McKenna – drums; Andy Nye – keyboards, backing vocals; John Verity – rhythm guitar (touring)	none – rehearsals and live performances only
January 1984 – February 1984 (Michael Schenker Group)	Michael Schenker – guitars; Gary Barden – lead vocals; Chris Glen – bass, backing vocals; Ted McKenna – drums; Andy Nye – keyboards, backing vocals	none – rehearsals and live performances only
March – April 1984 (Michael Schenker Group)	Michael Schenker – guitars; Gary Barden – vocals; Dennis Feldman – bass; Ted McKenna – drums; Andy Nye – keyboards, backing vocals	none – rehearsals and live performances only
June – August 1984 (Michael Schenker Group)	Michael Schenker – guitars; Ray Kennedy – vocals; Dennis Feldman – bass; Ted McKenna – drums; Andy Nye – keyboards, backing vocals	none – live performances and demos only
August – December 1984 (Michael Schenker Group)	Michael Schenker – guitars; Dennis Feldman – bass; Ted McKenna – drums; Andy Nye – keyboards, backing vocals	none – rehearsals only
Band inactive December 1984 – April 1986
April 1986 – mid-1987 (McAuley Schenker Group)	Robin McAuley – lead vocals; Michael Schenker – lead guitar, backing vocals; Steve Mann – keyboards, guitar, backing vocals; Rocky Newton – bass, backing vocals; Bodo Schopf – drums	Perfect Timing (1987)
mid-1987 – May 1988 (McAuley Schenker Group)	Robin McAuley – lead vocals; Michael Schenker – lead guitar, backing vocals; Mitch Perry – guitar, backing vocals; Rocky Newton – bass, backing vocals; Bodo Schopf – drums	Perfect Timing (1987)
June 1988 – mid-1991 (McAuley Schenker Group)	Robin McAuley – lead vocals; Michael Schenker – lead guitar, backing vocals; Steve Mann – guitar, keyboards, backing vocals; Rocky Newton – bass, backing vocals; Bodo Schopf – drums	Save Yourself (1989)
Mid – late 1991 (McAuley Schenker Group)	Robin McAuley – lead vocals; Michael Schenker – lead guitar, backing vocals; Jeff Pilson – bass (session); James Kottak – drums (session); Jesse Harms – keyboards (session)	M.S.G. (1991)
November 1991 – early 1993 (McAuley Schenker Group)	Robin McAuley – lead vocals, tambourine; Michael Schenker – lead guitar, backing vocals; Spencer Sercombe – guitar, backing vocals (touring)	Nightmare: The Acoustic M.S.G. (1992); "Unplugged" Live (1992)
Band inactive early 1993 – early 1996
Early – late 1996 (Michael Schenker Group)	Michael Schenker – lead guitar, backing vocals; Leif Sundin – lead vocals; Barry Sparks – bass, backing vocals; Shane Gaalaas – drums; Claude Gaudette – keyboards (session)	Written in the Sand (1996)
November 1996 – March 1997 (Michael Schenker Group)	Michael Schenker – lead guitar, backing vocals; Leif Sundin – lead vocals, guitar; David VanLanding – lead vocals, percussion; Seth Bernstein – rhythm guitar, keyboards, backing vocals; Barry Sparks – bass, backing vocals; Shane Gaalaas – drums, acoustic guitar	The Michael Schenker Story Live (1997)
May – June 1998 (Michael Schenker Group)	Michael Schenker – lead guitar, backing vocals; David VanLanding – lead vocals, percussion; Gary Barden – lead vocals; Seth Bernstein – rhythm guitar, keyboards, backing vocals; Jeff Kollman – bass; Shane Gaalaas – drums	none – live performances only
November 1998 – early 1999 (Michael Schenker Group)	Michael Schenker – lead guitar, backing vocals; Kelly Keeling – lead vocals; Seth Bernstein – keyboards, rhythm guitar, backing vocals; Shane Gaalaas – drums; John Onder – bass (session)	The Unforgiven (1999)
Early 1999 – mid-2000 (Michael Schenker Group)	Michael Schenker – lead guitar, backing vocals; Kelly Keeling – lead vocals; Keith Slack – lead vocals; Wayne Findlay – rhythm guitar, keyboards, backing vocals; Barry Sparks – bass, backing vocals; Shane Gaalaas – drums, acoustic guitar	The Unforgiven World Tour (1999)
March – September 2001 (Michael Schenker Group)	Michael Schenker – lead guitar, backing vocals; Chris Logan – lead vocals; Wayne Findlay – rhythm guitar, keyboards, backing vocals (touring only); Rev Jones – bass, backing vocals; Jeff Martin – drums, percussion, vocals	Be Aware of Scorpions (2001)
November 2001 – early 2003 (Michael Schenker Group)	Michael Schenker – lead guitar, backing vocals; Chris Logan – lead vocals; Wayne Findlay – rhythm guitar, keyboards, backing vocals; Rev Jones – bass, backing vocals; Jeremy Colson – drums	none – live performances only
April – late 2003 (Michael Schenker Group)	Michael Schenker – lead guitar, backing vocals; Chris Logan – lead vocals; Wayne Findlay – rhythm guitar, keyboards, backing vocals (touring only); Jeremy Colson – drums; Stuart Hamm – bass (session)	Arachnophobiac (2003)
October 2003 – November 2004 (Michael Schenker Group)	Michael Schenker – lead guitar, backing vocals; Chris Logan – lead vocals; Wayne Findlay – rhythm guitar, keyboards, backing vocals; Rev Jones – bass, backing vocals; Pete Holmes – drums	World Wide Live (2004)
November 2004 – May 2005 (Michael Schenker Group)	Michael Schenker – lead guitar, backing vocals; Leif Sundin – lead vocals; Wayne Findlay – rhythm guitar, keyboards, backing vocals; Rev Jones – bass, backing vocals; Pete Holmes – drums	none – live performances only
June – November 2005 (Michael Schenker Group)	Michael Schenker – lead guitar, backing vocals; Jari Tiura – lead vocals; Wayne Findlay – keyboards, guitar, backing vocals; Pete Way – bass (session); Jeff Martin – drums (session)	Tales of Rock'n'Roll (2006)
November 2005 – November 2006 (Michael Schenker Group)	Michael Schenker – lead guitar, backing vocals; Jari Tiura – lead vocals; Wayne Findlay – rhythm guitar, keyboards, backing vocals; Rev Jones – bass, backing vocals; Pete Holmes – drums	none – live performances only
January – August 2007 (Michael Schenker Group)	Michael Schenker – lead guitar, backing vocals; Jari Tiura – lead vocals; Wayne Findlay – rhythm guitar, keyboards, backing vocals; Frank Rummler – bass; Bodo Schopf – drums	none – live performances only
December 2007 – February 2008 (Michael Schenker Group)	Michael Schenker – lead guitar; Gary Barden – lead vocals; Neil Murray – bass (session); Simon Phillips – drums (session); Don Airey – keyboards (session)	In the Midst of Beauty (2008)
March – June 2008 (Michael Schenker Group)	Michael Schenker – lead guitar, backing vocals; Gary Barden – lead vocals; Wayne Findlay – rhythm guitar, keyboards, backing vocals; Chris Glen – bass, backing vocals; Ted McKenna – drums	none – rehearsals and live performances only
June – November 2008 (Michael Schenker Group)	Michael Schenker – lead guitar, backing vocals; Gary Barden – lead vocals; Wayne Findlay – rhythm guitar, keyboards, backing vocals; Chris Glen – bass, backing vocals; Chris Slade – drums	none – rehearsals and live performances only
February – May 2009 (Michael Schenker Group) (Note: this lineup did not tour)	Michael Schenker – lead guitar, backing vocals; Gary Barden – lead vocals; Wayne Findlay – rhythm guitar, keyboards, backing vocals; Robbie Crane – bass, backing vocals; Chris Slade – drums	none – rehearsals and live performances only
May – July 2009 (Michael Schenker Group)	Michael Schenker – lead guitar, backing vocals; Gary Barden – lead vocals; Wayne Findlay – rhythm guitar, keyboards, backing vocals; Rev Jones – bass, backing vocals; Pete Holmes – drums	none – rehearsals and live performances only
July 2009 (Michael Schenker Group)	Michael Schenker – lead guitar, backing vocals; Gary Barden – lead vocals; Wayne Findlay – rhythm guitar, keyboards, backing vocals; Elliott "Dean" Rubinson – bass; Chris Slade – drums	none – rehearsals and live performances only
September 2009 (Michael Schenker Group)	Michael Schenker – lead guitar, backing vocals; Gary Barden – lead vocals; Wayne Findlay – rhythm guitar, keyboards, backing vocals; Chris Glen – bass, backing vocals; Pete Holmes – drums	none – rehearsals and live performances only
December 2009 (Michael Schenker Group)	Michael Schenker – lead guitar, backing vocals; Gary Barden – lead vocals; Wayne Findlay – rhythm guitar, keyboards, backing vocals; Chris Glen – bass, backing vocals; Chris Slade – drums	none – rehearsals and live performances only
January 2010 (Michael Schenker Group)	Michael Schenker – lead guitar, backing vocals; Gary Barden – lead vocals; Wayne Findlay – keyboards, rhythm guitar, backing vocals; Neil Murray – bass; Simon Phillips – drums	The 30th Anniversary Concert: Live in Tokyo (2010)
May – June 2010 (Michael Schenker Group)	Michael Schenker – lead guitar, backing vocals; Gary Barden – lead vocals; Wayne Findlay – rhythm guitar, keyboards, backing vocals; Chris Glen – bass, backing vocals; Chris Slade – drums	none – live performances only
July 2010 (Michael Schenker Group)	Michael Schenker – lead guitar, backing vocals; Gary Barden – lead vocals; Wayne Findlay – rhythm guitar, keyboards, backing vocals; Chris Glen – bass, backing vocals; Pete Holmes – drums	none – live performances only
July 2010 (Michael Schenker Group)	Michael Schenker – lead guitar, backing vocals; Gary Barden – lead vocals; Wayne Findlay – rhythm guitar, keyboards, backing vocals; Elliott "Dean" Rubinson – bass; Carmine Appice – drums	none – live performances only
August 2010 (Michael Schenker Group)	Michael Schenker – lead guitar, backing vocals; Gary Barden – lead vocals; Wayne Findlay – rhythm guitar, keyboards, backing vocals; Rev Jones – bass, backing vocals; Carmine Appice – drums	none – live performances only
January 2011 (Michael Schenker Group)	Michael Schenker – lead guitar, backing vocals; Robin McAuley – lead vocals; Wayne Findlay – rhythm guitar, keyboards, backing vocals; Elliott "Dean" Rubinson – bass; Carmine Appice – drums	none – live performances only
February 2011 (Michael Schenker Group)	Michael Schenker – lead guitar, backing vocals; David VanLanding – lead vocals; Wayne Findlay – rhythm guitar, keyboards, backing vocals; Elliott "Dean" Rubinson – bass; Carmine Appice – drums	none – live performances only
June 2011 (Michael Schenker Group)	Michael Schenker – lead guitar, backing vocals; Gary Barden – lead vocals; Wayne Findlay – rhythm guitar, keyboards, backing vocals; Chris Glen – bass, backing vocals; Chris Slade – drums	none – live performances only
August 2011 (Michael Schenker Group)	Michael Schenker – lead guitar, backing vocals; Gary Barden – lead vocals; Wayne Findlay – rhythm guitar, keyboards, backing vocals; Elliott "Dean" Rubinson – bass; Pete Holmes – drums	none – live performances only
Early 2011 (Michael Schenker's Temple of Rock)	Michael Schenker – lead guitar, backing vocals; Michael Voss – lead vocals; Herman Rarebell – drums; Wayne Findlay – keyboards; Pete Way – bass (session)	Temple of Rock (2011)
July 2011 (Michael Schenker's Temple of Rock)	Michael Schenker – lead guitar, backing vocals; Michael Voss – lead vocals, guitar; Elliott "Dean" Rubinson – bass; Herman Rarebell – drums; Wayne Findlay – keyboards, rhythm guitar, backing vocals	Temple of Rock: Live in Europe (2012)
February – March 2012 (Michael Schenker's Temple of Rock)	Michael Schenker – lead guitar, backing vocals; Robin McAuley – lead vocals; Wayne Findlay – rhythm guitar, keyboards, backing vocals; Elliott "Dean" Rubinson – bass; Pete Holmes – drums	none – live performances only
March 2012 (Michael Schenker's Temple of Rock)	Michael Schenker – lead guitar, backing vocals; Michael Voss – lead vocals; Wayne Findlay – rhythm guitar, keyboards, backing vocals; Elliott "Dean" Rubinson – bass; Herman Rarebell – drums	none – live performances only
April – July 2012 (Michael Schenker's Temple of Rock)	Michael Schenker – lead guitar, backing vocals; Doogie White – lead vocals; Wayne Findlay – rhythm guitar, keyboards, backing vocals; Francis Buchholz – bass; Herman Rarebell – drums	Temple of Rock: Live in Europe (2012)
October – November 2012 (Michael Schenker's Temple of Rock)	Michael Schenker – lead guitar, backing vocals; David VanLanding – lead vocals; Wayne Findlay – rhythm guitar, keyboards, backing vocals; Elliott "Dean" Rubinson – bass; Pete Holmes – drums	none – live performances only
January – July 2013 (Michael Schenker's Temple of Rock)	Michael Schenker – lead guitar, backing vocals; Doogie White – lead vocals; Wayne Findlay – rhythm guitar, keyboards, backing vocals; Francis Buchholz – bass; Herman Rarebell – drums	Bridge the Gap (2013)
January – February 2014 (Michael Schenker's Temple of Rock)	Michael Schenker – lead guitar, backing vocals; Doogie White – lead vocals; Wayne Findlay – rhythm guitar, keyboards, backing vocals; Rev Jones – bass, backing vocals; Pete Holmes – drums	none – live performances only
March 2014 – February 2016 (Michael Schenker's Temple of Rock)	Michael Schenker – lead guitar, backing vocals; Doogie White – lead vocals; Wayne Findlay – keyboards, rhythm guitar, backing vocals; Francis Buchholz – bass; Herman Rarebell – drums	Spirit on a Mission (2015); On a Mission: Live in Madrid (2016)
June 2016 (Michael Schenker Fest)	Michael Schenker – lead guitar, backing vocals; Gary Barden – lead vocals; Graham Bonnet – lead vocals; Robin McAuley – lead vocals; Leif Sundin – lead vocals; Steve Mann – guitar, keyboards, backing vocals; Chris Glen – bass, backing vocals; Ted McKenna – drums	none – one live performance only
August 2016 – March 2018 (Michael Schenker Fest)	Michael Schenker – lead guitar, backing vocals; Gary Barden – lead vocals; Graham Bonnet – lead vocals; Robin McAuley – lead vocals; Steve Mann – guitar, keyboards, backing vocals; Chris Glen – bass, backing vocals; Ted McKenna – drums	Live: Tokyo International Forum Hall A (2017)
March 2018 – January 2019 (Michael Schenker Fest)	Michael Schenker – lead guitar, backing vocals; Gary Barden – lead vocals; Graham Bonnet – lead vocals; Robin McAuley – lead vocals; Doogie White – lead vocals; Steve Mann – keyboards, rhythm guitar, backing vocals; Chris Glen – bass, backing vocals; Ted McKenna – drums	Resurrection (2018); Revelation (2019)
January – February 2019 (Michael Schenker Fest)	Michael Schenker – lead guitar, backing vocals; Gary Barden – lead vocals; Graham Bonnet – lead vocals; Robin McAuley – lead vocals; Doogie White – lead vocals; Steve Mann – rhythm guitar, keyboards, backing vocals; Chris Glen – bass, backing vocals; Simon Phillips – drums (session)	Revelation (2019)
February – November 2019 (Michael Schenker Fest)	Michael Schenker – lead guitar, backing vocals; Gary Barden – lead vocals; Graham Bonnet – lead vocals; Robin McAuley – lead vocals; Doogie White – lead vocals; Steve Mann – rhythm guitar, keyboards, backing vocals; Chris Glen – bass, backing vocals; Bodo Schopf – drums	Revelation (2019)
November 2019 – January 2020 (Michael Schenker Fest)	Michael Schenker – lead guitar, backing vocals; Gary Barden – lead vocals; Graham Bonnet – lead vocals; Robin McAuley – lead vocals; Steve Mann – rhythm guitar, keyboards, backing vocals; Chris Glen – bass, backing vocals; Bodo Schopf – drums	none – live performances only
Summer 2020 (Michael Schenker Group)	Michael Schenker – lead guitar, backing vocals; Steve Mann – keyboards, rhythm guitar, backing vocals; Bodo Schopf – drums; Ronnie Romero – lead vocals; Barry Sparks – bass	Immortal (2021)
July 2021 – April 2022 (Michael Schenker Group)	Michael Schenker – lead guitar, backing vocals; Steve Mann – rhythm guitar, keyboards, backing vocals; Bodo Schopf – drums; Ronnie Romero – lead vocals; Barend Courbois – bass, backing vocals	none – live performances only
April – May 2022	Michael Schenker – lead guitar, backing vocals; Steve Mann – rhythm guitar, keyboards, backing vocals; Bodo Schopf – drums; Barend Courbois – bass, backing vocals; Robin McAuley – lead vocals	none – live performances only
May 2022 – June 2023 (Michael Schenker Group)	Michael Schenker – lead guitar, backing vocals; Steve Mann – rhythm guitar, keyboards, backing vocals; Bodo Schopf – drums; Barend Courbois – bass, backing vocals; Ronnie Romero – lead vocals	none
June 2023 – April 2025	Michael Schenker – lead guitar, backing vocals; Steve Mann – rhythm guitar, keyboards, backing vocals; Bodo Schopf – drums; Barend Courbois – bass, backing vocals; Robin McAuley – lead vocals	none
April 2025 – present	Michael Schenker – lead guitar, backing vocals; Steve Mann – rhythm guitar, keyboards, backing vocals; Bodo Schopf – drums; Barend Courbois – bass, backing vocals; Erik Gronwall – lead vocals	none to date
