= Michael Schenker Group discography =

- Studio albums: 13
- Live albums: 6
- Compilation albums: 9
- Video albums: 9

The following is a comprehensive discography of Michael Schenker Group.

== Discography ==
=== Studio albums ===
Title	Album details	Peak chart positions						
Title	Album details	GER	JPN	NLD	SWE	SWI	UK	US
The Michael Schenker Group	Released: August 1980; Label: Chrysalis	—	59	—	—	—	8	100
MSG	Released: September 1981; Label: Chrysalis	—	11	31	—	—	14	81
Assault Attack	Released: October 1982; Label: Chrysalis	—	9	—	34	—	19	151
Built to Destroy	Released: September 1983; Label: Chrysalis	—	6	—	32	—	23	—
Written in the Sand	Released: August 1996; Label: SPV GmbH	—	22	—	—	—	—	—
The Unforgiven	Released: February 1999; Label: SPV GmbH	92	58	—	—	—	—	—
Be Aware of Scorpions	Released: October 2001; Label: SPV GmbH	—	60	—	—	—	—	—
Arachnophobiac	Released: June 2003; Label: Shrapnel	—	115	—	—	—	—	—
Tales of Rock'n'Roll	Released: March 2006; Label: Armageddon Entertainment	—	67	—	—	—	—	—
In the Midst of Beauty	Released: May 2008; Label: In-Akustik	78	32	—	60	—	—	—
Immortal	Released: January 2021; Label: Nuclear Blast	—	21	—	—	8	—	—
Universal	Released: 27 May 2022; Label: Atomic Fire	13	25	—	—	20	—	—
Don't Sell Your Soul	Released: 3 October 2025; Label: Earmusic	44	32	—	—	32	—	—

=== Cover albums ===
Title	Album details	Peak chart positions
Title	Album details	JPN
Heavy Hitters	Released: July 2005; Label: Cleopatra	190
By Invitation Only	Released: 3 June 2011; Label: The Store For Music	—

=== Live albums ===
Title	Album details	Peak chart positions				Certifications (sales thresholds)
Title	Album details	JPN	NLD	SWE	UK	Certifications (sales thresholds)
One Night at Budokan	Released: February 1982; Label: Chrysalis	25	30	44	5	BPI: Silver
Rock Will Never Die	Released: June 1984; Label: Chrysalis	21	—	32	24	
BBC Radio 1 Live in Concert	Released: January 1995; Label: Griffin Music	—	—	—	—	
The Michael Schenker Story Live	Released: May 1997; Label: Michael Schenker Records	—	—	—	—	
The Unforgiven World Tour	Released: September 1999; Label: SPV GmbH	—	—	—	—	
The 30th Anniversary Concert – Live in Tokyo	Released: October 2010; Label: In-Akustik	126	—	—	—	

=== Compilations and box sets ===
Title	Album details
The Collection	Released: 1991; Label: Castle Communications
Essential Michael Schenker Group	Released: July 1992; Label: Chrysalis
Armed & Ready – The Best of the Michael Schenker Group	Released: 30 May 1994; Label: Music Club
Masters of Rock – The Michael Schenker Group	Released: August 2001; Label: EMI
The Best of the Michael Schenker Group 1980–1984	Released: September 2008; Label: EMI
Reactivate Live (2 CD set or 4 CD box)	Released: October 2002; Label: Zoom Club
Back to Attack Live (2 CD set or 4 CD box)	Released: May 2003; Label: Zoom Club
Walk the Stage – Official Bootleg Boxset (4 CD, 1 DVD box)	Released: June 2009; Label: EMI

== Videography ==
Title	Details	Peak chart positions
Title	Details	JPN
Rock Will Never Die	Released: 1984; Label: Chrysalis; Format: VHS	—
Super Rock '84 in Japan	Released: 1984; Label: Toho Video; Format: VHS	—
In the Recording Studio with Michael Schenker – The Making of the New MSG CD Unforgiven	Released: 1998; Label: Michael Schenker Records; Format: VHS	—
The Michael Schenker Story Live	Released: April 1999; Label: Michael Schenker Records; Format: VHS	—
Michael Schenker Live in Japan: The Unforgiven World Tour 2000	Released: 2000; Label: Michael Schenker Records; Format: VHS	—
World Wide Live 2004	Released: October 2004; Label: Metal Mind; Type: DVD	—
Live in Tokyo 1997	Released: July 2005; Label: Metal Mind; Format: DVD	—
The 30th Anniversary Concert – Live in Tokyo	Released: October 2010; Label: Inakustik; Format: DVD, Blu-ray	5
Rockpalast Hardrock Legends Vol. 2	Released: October 2010; Label: MIG; Format: DVD	—
