= In the Midst of Beauty =

Studio album by Michael Schenker Group
- Released: 13 May 2008
- Recorded: 2008
- Studio: Studio 2, Neu-Ulm, Germany, except drums at Phantom Recordings, Sherman Oaks, Los Angeles, California
- Genre: Hard rock, heavy metal
- Length: 49:35
- Label: In-akustik
- Producer: Michael Schenker, Romi Schickle, Siggi Schwarz

Michael Schenker Group chronology
Tales of Rock'n'Roll (2006)	In the Midst of Beauty (2008)	The 30th Anniversary Concert – Live in Tokyo (2010)

Michael Schenker chronology
Doctor Doctor: The Kulick Sessions (2007)	In the Midst of Beauty (2008)	Schenker Barden Acoustic Project - Gipsy Lady (2009)

Professional ratings
Review scores
Source	Rating
AllMusic	3.5/5 stars

In the Midst of Beauty is the thirteenth full-length studio album recorded by the various M.S.G. lineups and the tenth studio album by the Michael Schenker Group (MSG). The album was released on 13 May 2008 and marked the comeback of the original MSG singer, Gary Barden, so the MSG name is added with Schenker - Barden on the album's cover. By Schenker's own notes to the CD, "This title came about through my experience and realisation that - in the midst of beauty - the beast is always waiting and ready to attack...".

== Track listing ==
All titles written by Michael Schenker and Gary Barden

1. "City Lights" - 3:44
2. "Competition" - 3:20
3. "I Want You" - 4:32
4. "End of the Line" - 4:01
5. "Summerdays" - 5:12
6. "A Night to Remember" - 4:39
7. "Wings of Emotion" - 4:04
8. "Come Closer" - 2:57
9. "The Cross of Crosses" - 4:55
10. "Na Na" - 3:33
11. "I Am the One" - 3:54
12. "Ride on My Way" - 4:44

== Personnel ==
Band members

- Gary Barden - vocals
- Michael Schenker - guitars, producer
- Don Airey - keyboards, B3 organ
- Neil Murray - bass
- Simon Phillips - drums

Production

- Romi Schickle - producer, engineer, mixing
- Siggi Schwarz - producer, mixing

== Charts ==
Chart (2008)	Peak position
German Albums (Offizielle Top 100)	78
Japanese Albums (Oricon)	32
Swedish Albums (Sverigetopplistan)	60
UK Independent Albums (OCC)	29
