= Assault Attack =

Studio album by Michael Schenker Group
- Released: October 1982
- Recorded: Château d'Hérouville, France
- Genre: Hard rock, heavy metal
- Length: 39:52
- Label: Chrysalis
- Producer: Martin Birch

Michael Schenker Group chronology
One Night at Budokan (1981)	Assault Attack (1982)	Built to Destroy (1983)

Singles from Assault Attack
- 1. "Dancer" / "Girl from Uptown" Released: 27 August 1982

Assault Attack is the third studio album by the Michael Schenker Group, and the only album to feature former Rainbow vocalist Graham Bonnet. The album was recorded in France at the Château d'Hérouville and was produced by Martin Birch.

== Overview ==
After returning to the UK from Japan in August 1981, having recorded the live album One Night at Budokan, Schenker and his band played a short tour of the UK. After the tour, Cozy Powell and Peter Mensch (Michael Schenker Group's manager) wanted a better singer for the band and suggested David Coverdale, but Schenker himself wanted Graham Bonnet. After some disagreements, which ultimately led to the termination of the cooperation between Mensch and MSG, Bonnet joined the MSG in February 1982. Meanwhile, Powell and Paul Raymond left the band for their own reasons and were replaced by drummer Ted McKenna and session keyboardist Tommy Eyre. After four months the band went to France to start recording the album that would become Assault Attack with producer Martin Birch, who arrived fresh from Iron Maiden's album The Number of the Beast. The sessions took place at a French castle, Le Château d'Hérouville.

This was the last time until the Tales of Rock'n'Roll album that Schenker and Bonnet cooperated. The BBC broadcast of the Reading Festival concert was released in 1993 as BBC Radio 1 Live in Concert - this featured a returning Gary Barden on vocals.

More recent CD reissues contain the bonus track "Girl from Uptown", the b-side of "Dancer", the album's sole single. The title track was featured in the 2009 video game Brütal Legend.

== Reception ==
Professional ratings
Review scores
Source	Rating
AllMusic	3/5 stars
Collector's Guide to Heavy Metal	10/10
Metal Hammer (GER)	6/7 stars
Sounds	3/5 stars

Attracting mixed reviews on release, Assault Attack is now looked on more favourably, and Schenker himself is considered by many critics to be in top form.

In 2005, Assault Attack was ranked number 481 in Rock Hard magazine's book of The 500 Greatest Rock & Metal Albums of All Time.

== Track listing ==
Songwriters are listed in brackets.

Side one

1. "Assault Attack" (Michael Schenker, Graham Bonnet, Chris Glen, Ted McKenna) - 4:16
2. "Rock You to the Ground" (Schenker, Bonnet) - 5:48
3. "Dancer" (Schenker, Bonnet) - 4:41
4. "Samurai" (Schenker, Bonnet, Glen) - 5:16

Side two

5. "Desert Song" (Schenker, Bonnet) - 5:51
6. "Broken Promises" (Schenker, Bonnet, Glen) - 6:21
7. "Searching for a Reason" (Schenker, Bonnet) - 3:46
8. "Ulcer" (Schenker) - 3:53

=== Bonus track on the 2009 CD reissue ===
9. "Girl from Uptown" (Schenker, Bonnet) - 5:21

== Personnel ==
Band members

- Michael Schenker – guitars
- Graham Bonnet – vocals
- Chris Glen – bass
- Ted McKenna – drums

Additional musician

- Tommy Eyre – keyboards

Production

- Martin Birch – producer, engineer
- Benedict Tobias Fenner, Patrick Droguet – second engineers
- Jack Magill – album title
- Fin Costello – cover photo

== Charts ==
Chart (1982)	Peak position
Japanese Albums (Oricon)	9
Swedish Albums (Sverigetopplistan)	34
UK Albums (OCC)	19
US Billboard 200	151
