= Michael Schenker Group =

Multinational hard rock band

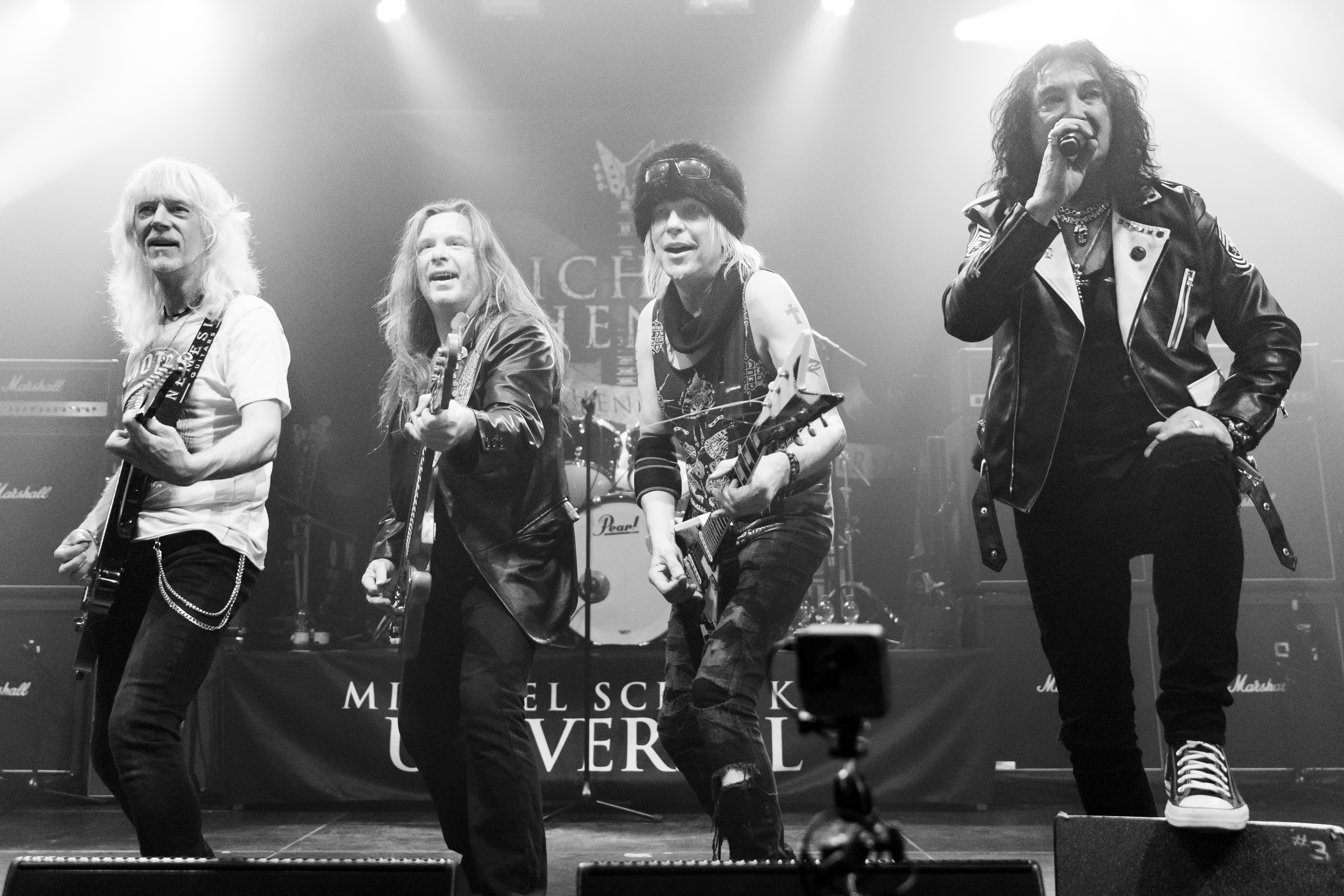
- MSG performing in 2022

Background information
- Also known as: MSG
- Origin: London, England
- Genres: Hard rock; heavy metal
- Years active: 1979–present
- Labels: Chrysalis; Capitol; Impact; Shrapnel; In-akustik
- Spinoffs: McAuley Schenker Group
- Spinoff of: UFO
- Members: Michael Schenker; Steve Mann; Bodo Schopf; Barend Courbois; Erik Grönwall
- Past members: See list

The Michael Schenker Group (often abbreviated as MSG) are an English hard rock band, formed in London in 1979 by former Scorpions and UFO guitarist Michael Schenker. After the release of their second live album, 1984's Rock Will Never Die, the band went on a two-year hiatus and Schenker disbanded the Michael Schenker Group in 1986, when he and vocalist Robin McAuley formed the McAuley Schenker Group.

Following the disbandment of the McAuley Schenker Group in 1993 and his initial return to UFO, Schenker reformed the Michael Schenker Group in 1995 and the band is still recording and performing to this day, sometimes under different names, including Michael Schenker's Temple of Rock and Michael Schenker Fest.

The Michael Schenker Group has had many members over the years, with Schenker the only constant.

== History ==
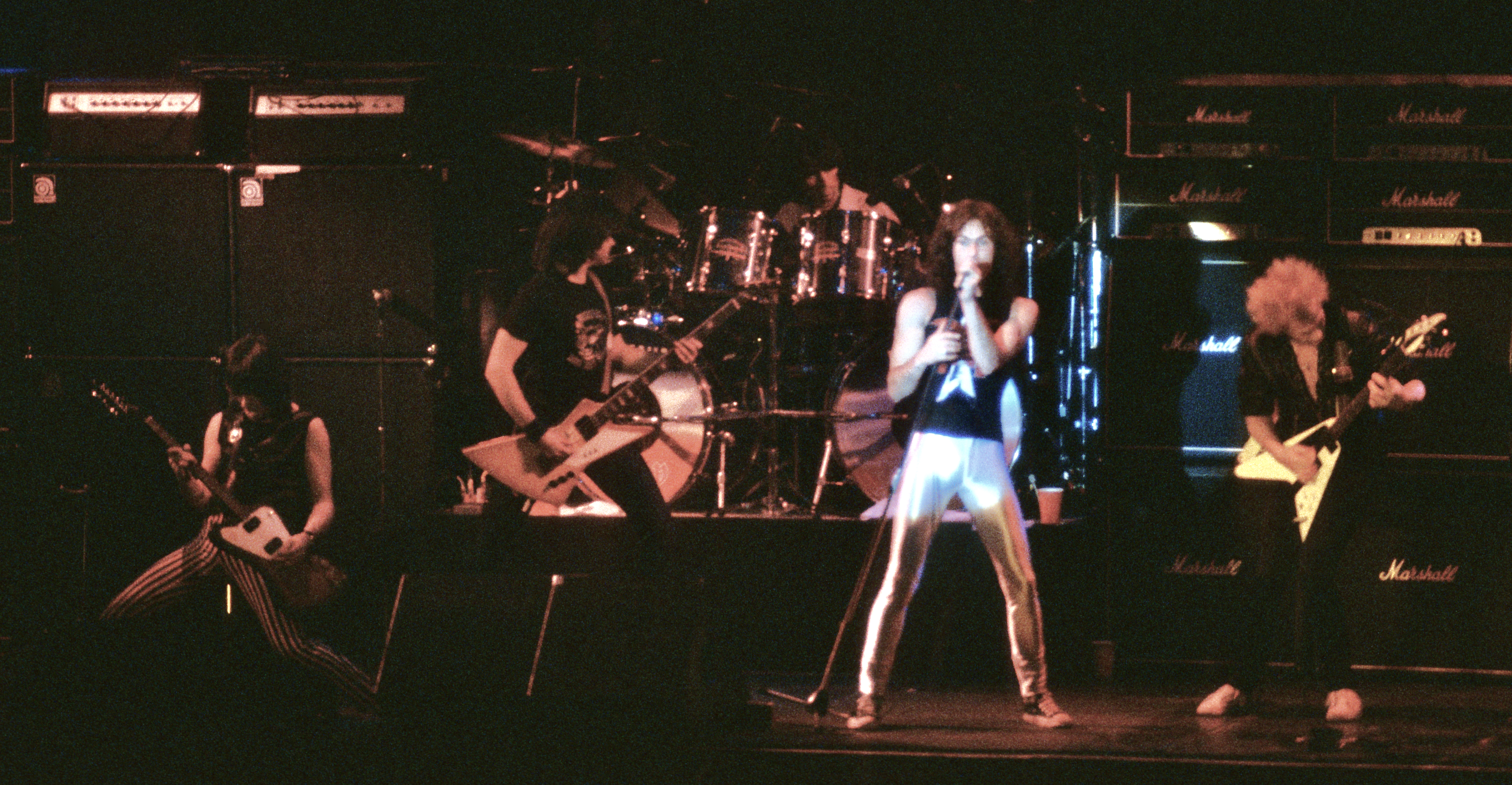
Michael Schenker Group performing at the Aragon Ballroom, Chicago, November 1980

The band was formed in 1979, following Michael Schenker's departure from UFO the previous year, to create a band that better suited his style. He therefore decided to move to London; a few weeks after his arrival in the city, he met Gary Barden, vocalist of Fraser Nash, who, along with bassist Billy Sheehan and drummer Denny Carmassi, formed a new band, simply called Michael Schenker Group. The following year, the band recorded their second album, MSG, which placed at No. 14 on the UK charts. During their promotional tour, they played at Tokyo's Nippon Budokan, where their first live album, titled One Night at Budokan, was recorded. It was released in 1982 with great success in the UK, where it was certified silver after exceeding 60,000 copies sold.

In October 1983, the band released Built to Destroy, the first with keyboardist Andy Nye and which also featured Derek St. Holmes, best known at the time as Ted Nugent's vocalist and rhythm guitarist. To promote it, they gave several concerts in the UK and later went on tour to other European countries as the opening band of Iron Maiden. Their farewell concert was held on 18 December 1983 at the Dortmund festival, after which the band disbanded, and the guitarist founded the McAuley Schenker Group.

After disbanding the McAuley Schenker Group and briefly returning to UFO, Schenker reformed the Michael Schenker Group around 1995 with Leif Sundin on vocals, Barry Sparks on bass and Shane Gaalaas on drums; this line-up recorded the album Written in the Sand, which was released in the following year. It was followed in 1999 by The Unforgiven, with Kelly Keeling replacing Sundin and with John Onder replacing Sparks.

== Discography ==
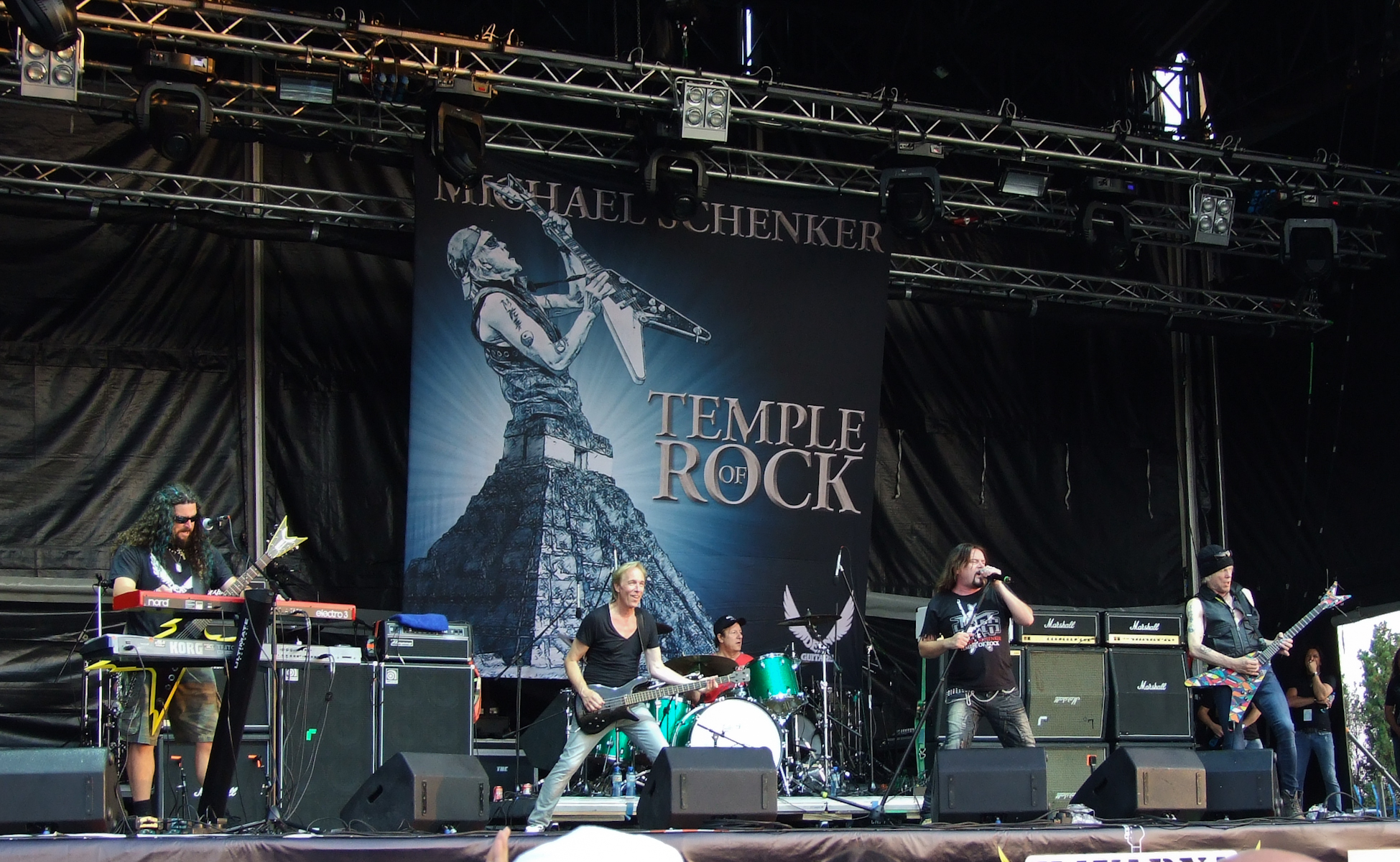
MSG at Kavarna Rock Fest 2012. From left: Wayne Findlay, Francis Buchholz, Herman Rarebell, Doogie White, Michael Schenker.

=== Studio albums ===
==== Michael Schenker Group ====
- The Michael Schenker Group (1980) No. 8 UK
- MSG (1981)
- Assault Attack (1982)
- Built to Destroy (1983)
- Written in the Sand (1996) No. 22 Japan
- The Unforgiven (1999)
- Be Aware of Scorpions (2001)
- Arachnophobiac (2003)
- Tales of Rock'n'Roll (2006)
- In the Midst of Beauty (2008)
- Immortal (2021)
- Universal (2022)
- Don't Sell Your Soul (2025)

==== McAuley Schenker Group ====
- Perfect Timing (1987)
- Save Yourself (1989)
- M.S.G. (1991)
- Nightmare: The Acoustic M.S.G. (1992)

==== Schenker Barden Acoustic Project ====
- Gipsy Lady (2009)

==== Michael Schenker's Temple of Rock ====
- Temple of Rock (2011)
- Bridge the Gap (2013)
- Spirit on a Mission (2015)

==== Michael Schenker Fest ====
- Resurrection (2018)
- Revelation (2019)

=== Cover albums ===
==== Michael Schenker Group ====
- Heavy Hitters (2005)
  - Doctor Doctor: The Kulick Sessions (2007 re-release)
  - By Invitation Only (2011 re-release)

=== Live albums ===
Michael Schenker Group

- One Night at Budokan (1982) (UK Silver)
- Rock Will Never Die (1984)
- BBC Radio One Live in Concert (1993)
- The Michael Schenker Story Live (1997)
- The Unforgiven World Tour 1999 (1999)
- The Mad Axeman Live (2007) reissues of Reactivate Live and Back To Attack Live
- Walk the Stage (The Official Bootleg Box Set) (2009)
- The 30th Anniversary Concert: Live in Tokyo (2010)

==== McAuley Schenker Group ====
- "Unplugged" Live (1992)

==== Michael Schenker's Temple of Rock ====
- Temple of Rock – Live in Europe (2012)
- On a Mission – Live in Madrid (2016)

==== Michael Schenker Fest ====
- Live Tokyo International Forum Hall A (2017)

== Members ==
Current members

- Michael Schenker – lead and rhythm guitar, backing vocals (1979–present)
- Steve Mann – keyboards, rhythm and occasional lead guitar, backing vocals (1986–1987, 1988–1991, 2016–present)
- Bodo Schopf – drums (1986–1987, 1988–1991, 2007–2008, 2019–present)
- Barend Courbois – bass guitar, backing vocals (2021–present)
- Erik Grönwall – lead vocals (2025–present)
