= Gary Barden =

British rock singer

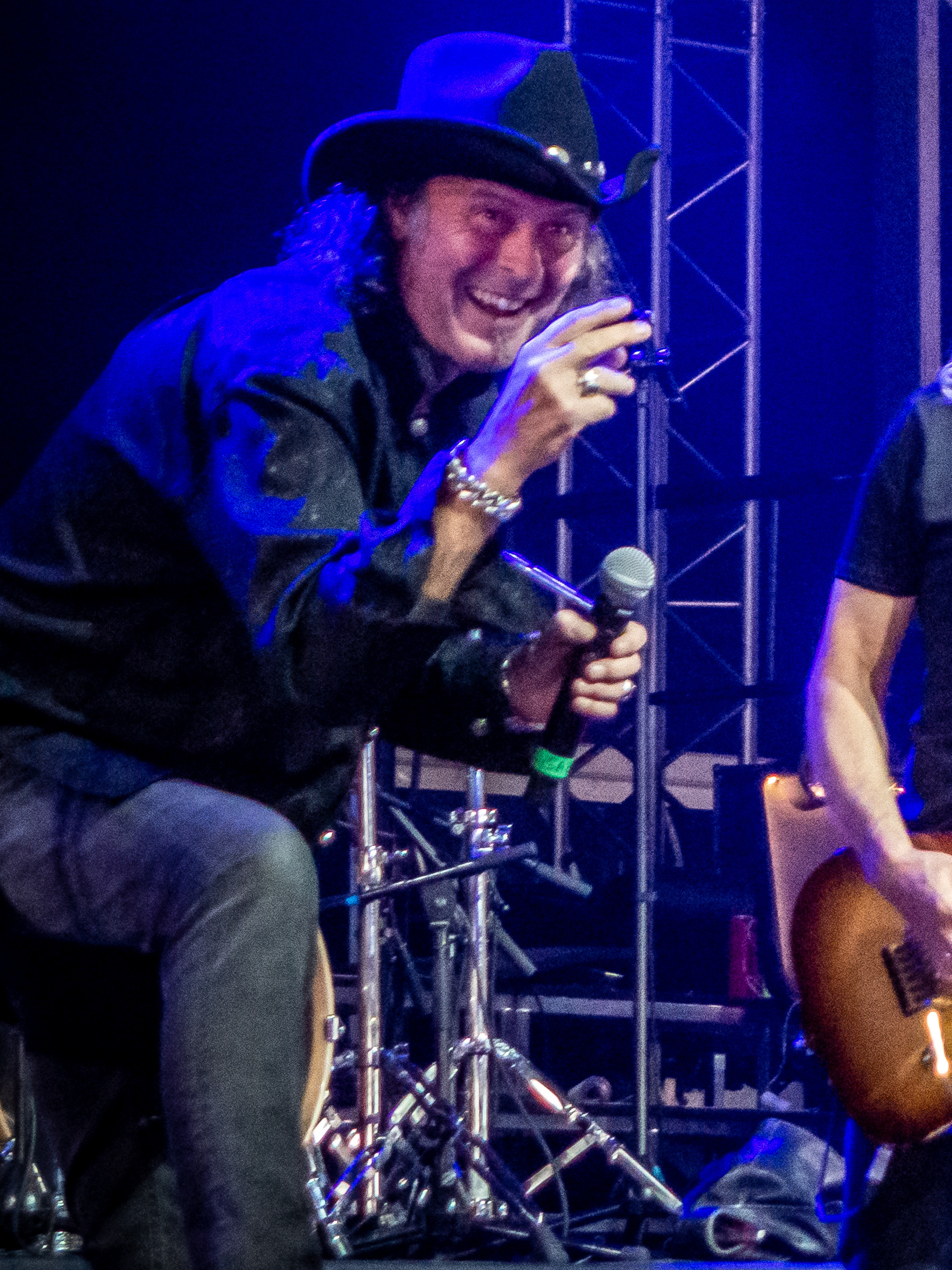
- Barden performing with Michael Schenker in 2019

Background information
- Born: Gary John Barden; 27 August 1955 (age 71); Royal Tunbridge Wells, Kent, England
- Genres: Hard rock; heavy metal; pop rock
- Occupation: Singer
- Years active: 1979–present
- Formerly of: Michael Schenker Group, Praying Mantis, The Company of Snakes, Michael Schenker Fest, Statetrooper, Silver

Gary John Barden (born 27 August 1955) is an English rock singer, best known for his work with the Michael Schenker Group.

== Career ==
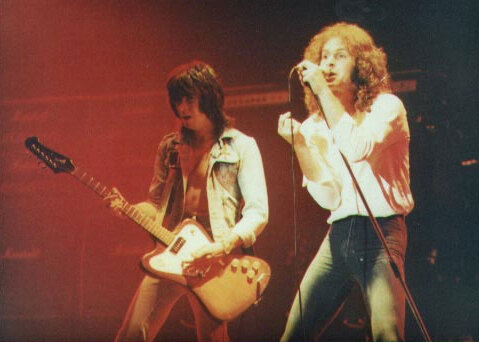
Barden (right) performing alongside Paul Raymond

Barden was discovered by Schenker upon the guitarist's hearing a demo of Barden's previous band, Fraser Nash. Barden proceeded to appear on The Michael Schenker Group (1980), MSG (1981) and One Night at Budokan (1981) albums. He was asked to leave the group and was replaced briefly by former Rainbow frontman Graham Bonnet. In the interim, Barden worked with Gary Moore on the demos of what would later become Moore's Corridors of Power album and joined MSG again to conclude the band's tour after Bonnet's departure and recorded the next album Built to Destroy (1983), and the live album Rock Will Never Die (1984). After his stint in MSG, he went on to form Statetrooper with brothers Steve and Paul Johnson, as well as record an album and tour as lead singer with Praying Mantis.

In 2007, Barden was fronting Silver and Statetrooper, and maintaining a solo career. He recorded an album with Michael Schenker Group called In the Midst of Beauty which was released in April 2008, followed by a world tour. In 2010, Barden, Schenker, Simon Philips, Neil Murray and Wayne Findlay embarked on an extensive tour of Japan, recording a new DVD to celebrate the 30th Anniversary of their debut album. After that, Barden left the band amicably to focus on his solo career. He rejoined Michael Schenker to record an album entitled Michael Schenker Fest, which was a collection of MSG's former singers to record new songs. Following the album's release, he and the rest of the group embarked on a world tour.

== Personal life ==
Barden currently resides in Bangkok, Thailand with his wife Suchi. They have a daughter Chimara (born 2000), who is a model. Barden and his family used to live in his home county of Kent, England before moving to his wife's native Ratchaburi province in Thailand to support her health problems as her doctor was from there.

== Discography ==
=== with The Michael Schenker Group (MSG) ===
- The Michael Schenker Group (1980)
- MSG (1981)
- One Night at Budokan (1982)
- Built to Destroy (1983)
- Rock Will Never Die (1984)
- Heavy Hitters (2005) (only one song)
- Tales of Rock'n'Roll - Twenty-Five Years Celebration (2006) (only one song)
- In the Midst of Beauty (2008)
- The 30th Anniversary Concert - Live in Tokyo (2010)
- Immortal (2021) (guest singer only in one song)
- Universal (2022) (guest singer only in one song, in a duet with Ronnie Romero)

=== with Schenker Barden Acoustic Project (MSG) ===
- Gipsy Lady (2009)

=== with Michael Schenker Fest (MSG) ===
- Tokyo International Forum Hall A - Live (2017)
- Resurrection (2018)
- Revelation (2019)

=== with Praying Mantis ===
- To the Power of Ten (1995)
- Captured Alive in Tokyo City (1996)

=== with Statetrooper ===
- Statetrooper (1986)
- The Calling (2004)

=== with Silver ===
- Silver (2001)
- Dream Machines (2002)
- Intruder (2003)
- Addiction (2004)
- Gold (2005)

=== Solo as Gary John Barden ===
- Past & Present (MSG remixed) (2004)
- Agony & The Xtasy (2006)
- Love and War (2007)
- Rock 'n Roll My Soul (2010)
- Eleventh Hour (2011)
- Empowered Emotions (2026)
