= The Michael Schenker Story Live =

Live hard rock album by Michael Schenker Group,

Live album by Michael Schenker Group
- Released: 10 May 1997
- Recorded: 19 March 1997
- Venue: Nakano Sun Plaza, Tokyo, Japan
- Genre: Hard rock, heavy metal
- Length: 141:18
- Label: Michael Schenker Records
- Producer: Ron Nevison

Michael Schenker Group chronology
Written in the Sand (1996)	The Michael Schenker Story Live (1997)	The Unforgiven (1999)

Michael Schenker chronology
Written in the Sand (1996)	The Michael Schenker Story Live (1997)	Thank You 2 (1998)

Professional ratings
Review scores
Source	Rating
AllMusic	2.5/5 stars

The Michael Schenker Story Live

Video by Michael Schenker Group
- Released: 1999
- Recorded: 19 March 1997
- Venue: Nakano Sun Plaza, Tokyo, Japan
- Genre: Hard rock, heavy metal
- Length: 175:00
- Label: Michael Schenker Records
- Director: Bella Piper
- Producer: Michael Schenker

Michael Schenker Group chronology
In the Recording Studio with Michael Schenker - The Making of the New MSG CD Unforgiven (1998)	The Michael Schenker Story Live (1999)	Michael Schenker Live in Japan The Unforgiven World Tour 2000 (2000)

The Michael Schenker Story Live is a live album by the hard rock band Michael Schenker Group, released in May 1997 through Michael Schenker's own record company.

This is a double-CD live album recorded during the March 1997 Japan tour. The recorded show was the last one of a series of 5 concerts and were all performed at the Nakano Sun Plaza in Tokyo on 19 March 1997. The concert lasted three hours and the setlist contains 30 songs. As its title tells, it covers the entire history of Michael Schenker musical career - from the Scorpions in 1969 to 1997.

The whole concert was filmed and released on VHS in 1999 and in 2005 on DVD with the title Live in Tokyo 1997. The DVD contains also footage from the Unforgiven World Tour of 2000.

== Track listing CD1 ==
1. "In Search of the Peace of Mind" - Scorpions - 4:18
2. "Doctor Doctor" - UFO - 4:59
3. "Let It Roll" - UFO - 4:22
4. "Natural Thing" - UFO - 3:34
5. "Lights Out" - UFO - 5:17
6. "Only You Can Rock Me" - UFO - 4:07
7. "Another Piece of Meat" - Scorpions - 3:52
8. "Into the Arena" - Michael Schenker Group - 7:04
9. "Are You Ready to Rock" - Michael Schenker Group - 4:12
10. "Assault Attack" - Michael Schenker Group - 4:18
11. "Captain Nemo" - Michael Schenker Group - 3:12
12. "No Time for Losers" - McAuley Schenker Group - 3:31
13. "Save Yourself" - McAuley-Schenker Group - 7:02
14. "All the Way from Memphis" - Contraband - 4:22
15. "Pushed to the Limit" - UFO - 3:54
16. "Written in the Sand" - Michael Schenker Group - 4:03

== Track listing CD2 ==
1. "Back to Life" - Michael Schenker Group - 6:26
2. "Love Never Dies" - Michael Schenker Group - 5:12
3. "Essence" - Michael Schenker Group - 6:21
4. "Never Ending Nightmare" - McAuley Schenker Group - 4:49
5. "Bijou Pleasurette" - Michael Schenker Group - 2:45
6. "Positive Forward" - Michael Schenker - 3:55
7. "Lost Horizons" - Michael Schenker Group - 5:41
8. "Too Hot to Handle" - UFO - 3:55
9. "Attack of the Mad Axeman" - Michael Schenker Group - 5:41
10. "Love to Love" - UFO - 8:02
11. "On and On" - Michael Schenker Group - 5:29
12. "Armed and Ready" - Michael Schenker Group - 5:12
13. "Feels Like a Good Thing" - Michael Schenker Group - 3:48
14. "Rock Bottom" - UFO - 10:21

== Personnel ==
Band members

- Michael Schenker – lead, rhythm & acoustic guitars, backing vocals
- Barry Sparks – bass & acoustic guitars, backing vocals
- Shane Gaalaas – drums, acoustic guitar
- Leif Sundin – vocals, rhythm & acoustic guitars
- David Van Landing – vocals, percussion
- Seth Bernstein – rhythm & acoustic guitars, keyboards, backing vocals

== Release history ==
The album original back cover

This album had 6 releases:

1. 1997 CD Michael Schenker
2. 1999 CD Michael Schenker 12
3. 2000 CD Cargo 992210
4. 2001 CD SPV 77267
5. 2001 CD Steamhammer/SPV SPV 085-72672 DCD
6. 2002 CD Import 77267

At the back of the booklet of the 2001 release of Steamhammer/SPV Shane Gaalaas is incorrectly noted as a bass guitar player. Instead he is the drummer. Another mistake is the listing of two songs not present on the second CD. The missing songs are "Bijou Pleasurette" and "Lost Horizons". Both songs are played on the concert, left out on the CD, but included on the video-registration available on the DVD Live in Tokyo 1997, released in 2005.

This is shown on the cd cover image of the backside.
