= Temple of Rock =

Studio album by Schenker's Temple of Rock
- Released: 7 Sep 2011
- Studio: Kidroom Studios, Münster, Germany
- Genre: Hard rock, heavy metal
- Length: 58:00 (European edition), 60:32 (Japanese edition), 64:08 (Limited edition)
- Label: in-akustik (Europe), King (Japan)
- Producer: Michael Schenker, Michael Voss

Michael Schenker chronology
The 30th Anniversary Concert – Live in Tokyo (2010)	Temple of Rock (2011)	Temple of Rock: Live in Europe (2012)

Professional ratings
Review scores
Source	Rating
AllMusic	3.5/5 stars

Temple of Rock is an album by the German guitarist Michael Schenker, released in Japan on 7 September 2011, in Europe on 23 September 2011, and in North America on 11 November 2011. Schenker's tour for the record had setlists with few tracks from the album, being primarily composed of UFO songs, older solo band material, and Scorpions songs.

== Track listing ==
All music by Michael Schenker, all lyrics by Michael Voss, except where indicated

1. "Intro" - 1:12
2. "How Long" - 3:56
3. "Fallen Angel" - 4:10
4. "Hanging On" - 4:01
5. "The End of an Era" - 3:57
6. "Miss Claustrophobia" - 4:47
7. "With You" (Michael Schenker) - 4:45
8. "Before the Devil Knows You're Dead" (Michael Schenker, Doogie White) - 4:39
9. "Storming In" - 4:43
10. "Scene of Crime" - 3:56
11. "Saturday Night" - 3:28
12. "Lover's Sinfony" (Michael Schenker, Robin McAuley) - 4:16
13. "Speed" - 4:11
14. "How Long (3 Generations Guitar-Battle Version)" - 5:50
15. "Remember" - 2:32 (Japanese edition bonus track)
16. "Miss Claustrophobia (Radio Edit)" - 3:36

== Personnel ==
=== Band members ===
- Michael Schenker - guitars
- Michael Voss - vocals
- Wayne Findlay - keyboards
- Pete Way - bass
- Herman Rarebell - drums

=== Additional musicians ===
Vocals

- William Shatner - spoken word on track 1
- Robin McAuley - track 12
- Doogie White - track 8

Guitars

- Rudolf Schenker - tracks 4, 7
- Michael Amott - track 14
- Leslie West - track 14

Keyboards

- Don Airey - track 5
- Paul Raymond - tracks 4, 7

Bass

- Chris Glen - tracks 9, 13
- Neil Murray - tracks 2, 14
- Elliott Dean Rubinson - tracks 4, 8, 15

Drums

- Carmine Appice - tracks 5, 15
- Simon Phillips - tracks 2, 14
- Chris Slade - tracks 9, 13
- Brian Tichy - track 8

== Charts ==
Chart (2011)	Peak position
Japan	43
UK Rock Albums Chart	37
