= Written in the Sand (album) =

Studio album by Michael Schenker Group
- Released: August 28, 1996
- Studio: Rumbo Recorders (Los Angeles); The Sound Lab and Phase Four (Tempe, Arizona)
- Genre: Hard rock
- Length: 51:03
- Label: Positive Energy Records; Zero Corporation (Japan)
- Producer: Ron Nevison

Michael Schenker Group chronology
Rock Will Never Die (1984)	Written in the Sand (1996)	The Michael Schenker Story Live (1997)

Michael Schenker chronology
Walk on Water (1995)	Written in the Sand (1996)	The Michael Schenker Story Live (1997)

Professional ratings
Review scores
Source	Rating
AllMusic	4/5 stars
Collector's Guide to Heavy Metal	6/10

Written in the Sand is the eighth full-length studio album by the Michael Schenker Group, and the first after the McAuley Schenker Group era. For this effort, Schenker gathered a new group of players, composed of Leif Sundin on vocals, Shane Gaalaas on drums, and Barry Sparks on bass.

== Track listing ==
All music by Michael Schenker, all lyrics by Leif Sundin.

1. "Brave New World" - 4:14
2. "Cry No More" - 5:18
3. "I Believe" - 5:48
4. "Back to Life" - 6:12
5. "Written in the Sand" - 3:28
6. "Essenz" (instrumental) - 5:21
7. "Love Never Dies" - 5:45
8. "I Will Be There" - 5:03
9. "Take Me Through the Night" - 6:08
10. "Down the Drain" - 3:46
11. "Sweet Cool Kiss of Night" (bonus track) - 4:30

=== Japanese edition ===
1. "Brave New World" - 4:14
2. "Essenz" (instrumental) - 5:21
3. "Cry No More" - 5:18
4. "Back to Life" - 6:12
5. "Written in the Sand" - 3:28
6. "Love Never Dies" - 5:45
7. "I Will Be There" - 5:03
8. "Take Me Through the Night" - 6:08
9. "Down the Drain" - 3:46
10. "I Believe" - 5:48
11. "Into The Arena" (live bonus track) - 3:56
12. "Cry For The Nations" (live bonus track) - 5:37

== Personnel ==
=== Band members ===
- Michael Schenker - lead & rhythm guitars
- Leif Sundin - vocals
- Barry Sparks - bass guitar
- Shane Gaalaas - drums

=== Additional musicians ===
- Claude Gaudette - keyboards

=== Production ===
- Ron Nevison - producer, engineer, mixing

== Charts ==
Chart (1996)	Peak position
Japanese Albums (Oricon)	22
