= The 30th Anniversary Concert: Live in Tokyo =

2010 live video album by the Michael Schenker Group

The 30th Anniversary Concert - Live in Tokyo

Video by Michael Schenker Group
- Released: 19 October 2010
- Recorded: 13 January 2010
- Venue: Nakano Sun Plaza, Tokyo, Japan
- Genre: Hard rock, heavy metal
- Length: 175:00
- Label: In-akustik
- Director: Kiyoshi Iwasawa, Shin Yamamoto
- Producer: Kiyoshi Iwasawa, Kota Akutsu

Michael Schenker Group video chronology
World Wide Live 2004 (2004)	The 30th Anniversary Concert - Live in Tokyo (2010)	Rockpalast Hardrock Legends Vol. 2 (2010)

The 30th Anniversary Concert - Live in Tokyo

Live album by Michael Schenker Group
- Released: 19 October 2010
- Recorded: 13 January 2010
- Venue: Nakano Sun Plaza, Tokyo, Japan
- Genre: Hard rock, heavy metal
- Length: 99:54
- Label: In-akustik
- Producer: Kiyoshi Iwasawa

Michael Schenker Group chronology
In the Midst of Beauty (2008)	The 30th Anniversary Concert - Live in Tokyo (2010)

Michael Schenker chronology
Schenker Barden Acoustic Project - Gipsy Lady (2009)	The 30th Anniversary Concert - Live in Tokyo (2010)	Temple of Rock (2011)

Professional ratings
Review scores
Source	Rating
AllMusic	3.5/5 stars
Classic Rock	3/10 stars
Record Collector	5/5 stars

The 30th Anniversary Concert - Live in Tokyo is a live video album by the Michael Schenker Group, released in 2010.

The recorded live performance was filmed at the Nakano Sun Plaza in Tokyo on 13 January 2010, during the 30th Anniversary Japan Tour. The footage originally aired on 27 March on the Japanese TV channel NHK-BS2. The concert was released in DVD containing 18 tracks, in Blu-ray Disc and as a double CD album, with exactly the same tracks.

== Double CD track listing ==
=== Disk one ===
No.	Title	Writer(s)	Length
1.	"Welcome Howl"	Michael Schenker	2:06
2.	"Feels Like a Good Thing"	Schenker, Gary Barden	3:45
3.	"Cry for the Nations"	Schenker, Barden	5:50
4.	"Let Sleeping Dogs Lie"	Schenker, Barden, Chris Glen, Paul Raymond, Cozy Powell	6:59
5.	"Armed and Ready"	Schenker, Barden	4:24
6.	"Victim of Illusion"	Schenker, Barden	5:22
7.	"Are You Ready to Rock"	Schenker, Barden	6:49
8.	"I Want You"	Schenker, Barden	4:00
9.	"Night to Remember"	Schenker, Barden	4:14
10.	"Into the Arena"	Schenker	4:22
Total length:			47:50

=== Disc two ===
No.	Title	Writer(s)	Length
1.	"Lost Horizons"	Schenker, Barden	9:52
2.	"Rock My Nights Away"	Barden, Andy Nye	4:48
3.	"On and On"	Schenker, Barden	5:40
4.	"Attack of the Mad Axeman"	Schenker, Barden	5:16
5.	"Ride on My Way"	Schenker, Barden	4:27
6.	"Rock Bottom"	Schenker, Phil Mogg	11:39
7.	"Dance Lady Gypsy"	Schenker	4:28
8.	"Doctor Doctor"	Schenker, Mogg	5:51
Total length:			52:01

== DVD ==
The track listing is the same as the audio album.

Bonus material

- The L.A. Rehearsal
- Backstage Impressions

== Personnel ==
=== Band members ===
- Gary Barden - lead vocals
- Michael Schenker - lead/rhythm/acoustic guitars, backing vocals
- Wayne Findlay - keyboards, rhythm guitars, backing vocals
- Neil Murray - bass
- Simon Phillips - drums

=== Production ===
- Kiyoshi Iwasawa - director and producer
- Shin Yamamoto - director
- Kota Akutsu - producer
- Michael Voss - mixing
