= One Night at Budokan =

Live album by Michael Schenker Group
- Released: February 1982
- Recorded: 12 August 1981
- Venue: Nippon Budokan, Tokyo, Japan
- Genre: Hard rock
- Length: 75:50
- Label: Chrysalis
- Producer: MSG, David Wooley and David Kirkwood

Michael Schenker Group chronology
MSG (1981)	One Night at Budokan (1982)	Assault Attack (1982)

Professional ratings
Review scores
Source	Rating
AllMusic	3/5 stars
Collector's Guide to Heavy Metal	5/10

One Night at Budokan is a live album by Michael Schenker Group released in 1982. This album was recorded at Nippon Budokan in Tokyo, Japan as part of their 1981 tour.

== Track listing ==
=== 1982 original LP ===
All songs written by Michael Schenker and Gary Barden except where noted.

Side one

1. "Armed and Ready" - 6:20
2. "Cry for the Nations" - 5:32
3. "Attack of the Mad Axeman" - 4:50

Side two

1. "But I Want More" - 5:24
2. "Victim of Illusion" - 6:18
3. "Into the Arena" (Schenker) - 4:45

Side three

1. "On and On" 5:32
2. "Never Trust a Stranger" (Paul Raymond) - 6:07
3. "Let Sleeping Dogs Lie" (Schenker, Barden, Chris Glen, Raymond, Cozy Powell) - 7:18

Side four

1. "Courvoisier Concerto" (Schenker, Raymond) - 3:42
2. "Lost Horizons" - 7:22
3. "Doctor Doctor" (Schenker, Phil Mogg) - 5:30
4. "Ready to Rock" - 7:10

=== 2009 Remastered Edition with bonus tracks ===
Disc 1

1. "Intro: "Ride of the Valkyries" from act 3 of Die Walküre (Richard Wagner)" - 1:31*
2. "Armed and Ready" - 4:52
3. "Cry for the Nations" - 5:30
4. "Attack of the Mad Axeman" - 5:04
5. "But I Want More" - 7:22
6. "Victim of Illusion" - 6:14
7. "Into the Arena" (Schenker) - 4:54

Disc 2

1. "On and On" - 5:35
2. "Never Trust a Stranger" (Paul Raymond) - 5:36
3. "Let Sleeping Dogs Lie" (Schenker, Barden, Chris Glen, Raymond, Cozy Powell) - 7:17
4. "Tales of Mystery" - 3:50 (*)
5. "Cozy Powell Drum Solo" (Cozy Powell) - 11:23 (*)
6. "Courvoisier Concerto" (Schenker, Raymond) - 3:35
7. "Lost Horizons" - 7:30
8. "Doctor Doctor" (Schenker, Phil Mogg) - 6:18
9. "Ready to Rock" - 6:39

(*)Bonus Tracks not featured on original LP

== Personnel ==
Band members

- Michael Schenker – lead guitar
- Gary Barden – lead vocals
- Chris Glen – bass
- Cozy Powell – drums
- Paul Raymond – keyboards, rhythm guitar, backing vocals

Production

- Producer – MSG, David Wooley and David Kirkwood
- Recorded at The Nippon Budokan on August 12, 1981
- Mixed at Air Studios, London

== Charts ==
Chart (1982)	Peak position
Dutch Albums (Album Top 100)	30
Japanese Albums (Oricon)	25
Swedish Albums (Sverigetopplistan)	44
UK Albums (OCC)	5

== Certifications ==
Region	Certification	Certified units/sales
United Kingdom (BPI)	Silver	60,000^{^}
^{^} Shipments figures based on certification alone.
