= MSG (Michael Schenker Group album) =

Studio album by Michael Schenker Group
- Released: September 1981
- Recorded: March–May 1981
- Studio: AIR Studios, London and Montserrat
- Genre: Hard rock
- Length: 36:47
- Label: Chrysalis
- Producer: Ron Nevison

Michael Schenker Group chronology
| The Michael Schenker Group (1980) | MSG (1981) | One Night at Budokan (1982) |

Singles from MSG
- 1. "Ready to Rock" / "Attack of the Mad Axeman" Released: August 1981

Professional ratings
Review scores
| Source | Rating |
|---|---|
| AllMusic | 3.5/5 stars |
| Collector's Guide to Heavy Metal | 7/10 |

MSG is the second album by the hard rock band Michael Schenker Group, released in 1981. MSG saw Schenker reunited with his former UFO bandmate Paul Raymond, and was the last album to feature Gary Barden until 1983's Built to Destroy.

== Track listing ==
All tracks are written by Michael Schenker and Gary Barden except where noted.

Side one
| No. | Title | Writer(s) | Length |
|---|---|---|---|
| 1. | "Ready to Rock" | | 3:26 |
| 2. | "Attack of the Mad Axeman" | | 4:17 |
| 3. | "On and On" | | 4:41 |
| 4. | "Let Sleeping Dogs Lie" | Barden, Chris Glen, Cozy Powell, Paul Raymond, Schenker | 5:21 |

Side two
| No. | Title | Writer(s) | Length |
|---|---|---|---|
| 5. | "But I Want More" | | 6:56 |
| 6. | "Never Trust a Stranger" | Raymond | 4:24 |
| 7. | "Looking for Love" | | 4:03 |
| 8. | "Secondary Motion" | | 3:42 |
| Total length: | | | 36:47 |

2009 reissue bonus tracks
| No. | Title | Writer(s) | Length |
|---|---|---|---|
| 9. | "Never Trust a Stranger (Rough Monitor Mix)" | Raymond | 4:33 |
| 10. | "Natural Thing" | Schenker, Phil Mogg, Pete Way | 4:18 |
| 11. | "Feels Like a Good Thing" | | 3:53 |
| 12. | "Looking Out from Nowhere" | | 5:55 |
| 13. | "Shoot Shoot" | Schenker, Mogg, Andy Parker, Way | 4:39 |
| 14. | "Doctor Doctor" | Schenker, Mogg | 5:31 |
| 15. | "Lights Out" | Schenker, Mogg, Parker, Way | 5:09 |
| Total length: | | | 71:33 |

- Tracks 10 to 15 recorded live at the Manchester Apollo on 30 September 1980

== Personnel ==
Band members

- Michael Schenker – lead guitar
- Gary Barden – lead and backing vocals
- Chris Glen – bass
- Cozy Powell – drums
- Paul Raymond – keyboards, rhythm guitar

Additional musicians

- Stephen Stills, Billy Nicholls – backing vocals

Production

- Ron Nevison – producer, engineer, mixing
- Rick Isbell, Renate, Mike Stavrou, David Wooley – assistant engineers
- Gareth Edwards – live tracks engineer

== Charts ==
| Chart (1981) | Peak position |
|---|---|
| Dutch Albums (Album Top 100) | 31 |
| Japanese Albums (Oricon) | 15 |
| UK Albums (OCC) | 14 |
| US Billboard 200 | 81 |
