= The Michael Schenker Group (album) =

Studio album by Michael Schenker Group
- Released: 29 August 1980
- Recorded: May–July 1980
- Studio: Wessex, London, UK
- Genre: Hard rock; heavy metal
- Length: 39:28
- Label: Chrysalis
- Producer: Roger Glover

Michael Schenker Group chronology
The Michael Schenker Group (1980)	MSG (1981)

Michael Schenker chronology
Lovedrive (1979)	The Michael Schenker Group (1980)	MSG (1981)

Singles from The Michael Schenker Group
- 1. "Armed and Ready" Released: 22 August 1980; 2. "Cry for the Nations" Released: October 1980

The Michael Schenker Group is the debut studio album by English hard rock band Michael Schenker Group, released in 1980. This was the first album after Schenker's departure from UFO in 1978 and brief reunion with Scorpions for the album Lovedrive.

== Reception and legacy ==
Professional ratings
Review scores
Source	Rating
AllMusic	4.5/5 stars
Billboard	(favourable)
Collector's Guide to Heavy Metal	8/10

The album was a commercial and critical success, entering the charts in the US, the UK and Japan, and was supported by the singles "Armed and Ready" and "Cry for the Nations". The album also topped the KTUH's charts on the week of 29 September 1980.

The song "Armed and Ready" is featured in the video game Guitar Hero: Metallica.

== Track listing ==
All songs written by Michael Schenker and Gary Barden unless otherwise noted.

Side one

1. "Armed and Ready" - 4:05
2. "Cry for the Nations" - 5:08
3. "Victim of Illusion" - 4:41
4. "Bijou Pleasurette" (Schenker) - 2:16
5. "Feels Like a Good Thing" - 3:44

Side two

6. "Into the Arena" (Schenker) - 4:10
7. "Looking Out from Nowhere" - 4:28
8. "Tales of Mystery" - 3:16
9. "Lost Horizons" - 7:04

=== 2009 Reissue bonus tracks ===
10. "Just a Lover" (demo) - 4:34
11. "Looking Out from Nowhere" (demo) - 5:13
12. "Get Up and Get Down" (demo) - 3:59
13. "After Midnight" (demo) - 4:31
14. "Breakout" (demo) - 4:42
15. "Cry for the Nations" (radio edit) - 3:35
16. "Armed and Ready" (live at the Manchester Apollo) - 4:40
17. "Into the Arena" (live at the Hammersmith Odeon, London) - 4:13

== Personnel ==
Band members

- Michael Schenker – guitars
- Gary Barden – vocals

Session musicians

- Simon Phillips – drums
- Mo Foster – bass
- Don Airey – keyboards

Production

- Roger Glover – producer
- Gareth Edwards – engineer
- Jeremy Allom – tape operator

1979 demos on 2009 reissue

- Michael Schenker – guitars
- Gary Barden – vocals
- Billy Sheehan – bass
- Denny Carmassi – drums

1980 Live tracks on 2009 reissue

- Michael Schenker – guitars
- Gary Barden – vocals
- Chris Glen – bass
- Cozy Powell – drums
- Paul Raymond – keyboards

== Charts ==
Chart (1980)	Peak position
Japanese Albums (Oricon)	59
UK Albums (OCC)	8
US Billboard 200	100
