= Rock Will Never Die =

1984 live album by Michael Schenker Group

Live album by Michael Schenker Group
- Released: June 1984
- Recorded: Hammersmith Odeon, London, England; 22–23 October 1983
- Genres: Hard rock, heavy metal
- Length: 41:16; 68:52 (2009 edition)
- Label: Chrysalis
- Producer: Jack Douglas

Michael Schenker Group chronology
Built to Destroy (1983)	Rock Will Never Die (1984)	Written in the Sand (1996)

Michael Schenker chronology
Built to Destroy (1983)	Rock Will Never Die (1984)	Perfect Timing (1987)

Professional ratings
Review scores
Source	Rating
AllMusic	2/5 stars

Rock Will Never Die

Video by Michael Schenker Group
- Released: 1984
- Recorded: Hammersmith Odeon, London, England; October 22–23, 1983
- Genres: Hard rock, heavy metal
- Length: 48:15
- Labels: Chrysalis, Hendring
- Producers: Jack Douglas, Paul O'Neill, David Krebbs, Steve Leber

Michael Schenker Group chronology
Rock Will Never Die (1984)	Super Rock '84 in Japan (1985)

Rock Will Never Die is a Michael Schenker Group live album released in 1984 and recorded at Hammersmith Odeon in London, over two nights in October 1983. The concert was also released in VHS with the same title. This is the last album recorded with Gary Barden before he rejoined the band in 2008.

The final track "Doctor Doctor", which Schenker originally recorded with UFO, features a guest appearance by Klaus Meine and Rudolf Schenker of Scorpions, Michael Schenker's former band.

== Track listing ==
See 2009 remastered version for songwriting credits.

1. "Captain Nemo" - 3:42
2. "Rock My Nights Away" - 4:05
3. "Are You Ready to Rock" - 4:07
4. "Attack of the Mad Axeman" - 4:10
5. "Into the Arena" - 4:00
6. "Rock Will Never Die" - 5:25
7. "Desert Song" - 6:00
8. "I'm Gonna Make You Mine" - 4:57
9. "Doctor Doctor" - 4:50

=== 2009 remastered edition ===
All songs written by Michael Schenker and Gary Barden unless otherwise noted.

1. "Captain Nemo" (Schenker) - 3:52
2. "Rock My Nights Away" (Andy Nye, Barden) - 4:13
3. "Are You Ready to Rock" - 4:13
4. "Cry for the Nations" - 5:11
5. "Rock You to the Ground" (Schenker, Graham Bonnet) - 5:37
6. "Attack of the Mad Axeman" - 5:11
7. "Into the Arena" (Schenker) - 4:22
8. "Courvoisier Concerto" (Schenker, Paul Raymond) - 2:12
9. "Rock Will Never Die" - 5:26
10. "Desert Song" (Schenker, Bonnet) - 5:50
11. "I'm Gonna Make You Mine" (Nye, Barden, Schenker, Ted McKenna) - 5:34
12. "Red Sky" (Schenker, Barden, Chris Glen, McKenna, José Luis) - 6:00
13. "Looking for Love" - 3:43
14. "Armed and Ready" - 4:45
15. "Doctor Doctor" (Schenker, Phil Mogg) - 7:31

== VHS track listing ==
1. "Captain Nemo" - 3:42
2. "Rock My Nights Away" - 4:05
3. "Are You Ready to Rock" - 4:07
4. "Attack of the Mad Axeman" - 4:10
5. "Into the Arena" - 4:00
6. "Courvoisier Concerto" - 2:13
7. "Dream On (Rock Will Never Die)" - 5:25
8. "Desert Song" - 6:00
9. "I'm Gonna Make You Mine" - 4:57
10. "Armed and Ready" - 4:46
11. "Doctor Doctor" - 4:50

== Personnel ==
Band members

- Michael Schenker – lead guitar
- Gary Barden – lead vocals
- Chris Glen – bass
- Ted McKenna – drums
- Andy Nye – keyboards, backing vocals
- Derek St. Holmes – rhythm guitar, backing vocals, lead vocals on "I'm Gonna Make You Mine", co-lead vocals on "Rock You to the Ground"

Guest musicians

- Klaus Meine – co-lead vocals on "Doctor Doctor"
- Rudolf Schenker – rhythm guitar on "Doctor Doctor"

== Charts ==
Chart (1984)	Peak position
Finnish Albums (The Official Finnish Charts)	17
German Albums (Offizielle Top 100)	58
Japanese Albums (Oricon)	21
Swedish Albums (Sverigetopplistan)	32
UK Albums (Official Charts)	24
