= Tales of Rock'n'Roll =

Studio album by Michael Schenker Group
- Released: 27 March 2006
- Studio: Michael Schenker Recording Studio
- Genres: Hard rock, heavy metal
- Length: 56:50
- Label: Armageddon Music
- Producer: Michael Schenker

Michael Schenker Group chronology
Heavy Hitters (2005)	Tales of Rock'n'Roll (2006)	In the Midst of Beauty (2008)

Michael Schenker chronology
Heavy Hitters (2005)	Tales of Rock'n'Roll (2006)	Siggi Schwarz and Michael Schenker - Live Together 2004 (2006)

Professional ratings
Review scores
Source	Rating
AllMusic	3.5/5 stars
Blabbermouth.net	6/10 stars

Tales of Rock'n'Roll is the twelfth full-length studio album by the Michael Schenker Group, the ninth not counting the McAuley Schenker Group era. It was released in 2006 after two years of work in celebration of the band's 25th anniversary. The music was initially composed for a UFO concept album but Schenker decided instead to use it for a new MSG album after he reformed the band with a new line-up. Every lead singer from MSG's past incarnations contributed lyrics and vocals.

== Track listing ==
All music by Michael Schenker, all lyrics by Jari Tiura, except where indicated

1. "The Ride" - 3:16
2. "Setting Sun" - 3:44
3. "Angel of Avalon" (Leif Sundin) - 2:21
4. "Dreams Inside" (Chris Logan) - 3:33
5. "Dust to Dust" - 3:28
6. "Voice of My Heart" - 2:40
7. "Journeyman" - 2:30
8. "Big Deal (False Alarms)" (Kelly Keeling) - 2:59
9. "St. Ann" - 1:38
10. "Shadow Lady" - 2:31
11. "Love Trade" - 3:48
12. "Human Child" - 2:58
13. "Bittersweet" - 3:04
14. "Blind Alley" - 2:44
15. "Freedom" - 3:58
16. "Life Vacation" (Kelly Keeling) - 2:53
17. "Rock 'n' Roll" (Graham Bonnet) - 3:42
18. "Tell a Story" (Robin McAuley) - 3:08
19. "Life Goes On" (instrumental) - 1:51
20. "Interview" (Austrian edition bonus track)

== Personnel ==
Band members

- Michael Schenker – lead and rhythm guitars, producer
- Jari Tiura – vocals
- Pete Way – bass
- Jeff Martin – drums
- Wayne Findlay – keyboards, 7-string guitars, lead guitar trade off with Schenker on "Big Deal" and "Life Vacation"

Additional musicians

- Gary Barden – vocals on "Life Vacation"; lyrics and melodies by Kelly Keeling
- Graham Bonnet – vocals on "Rock 'n' Roll"
- Robin McAuley – vocals on "Tell a Story"
- Kelly Keeling – vocals on "Big Deal (False Alarms)"; lyrics and melodies by Kelly Keeling
- Leif Sundin – vocals on "Angel of Avalon"
- Chris Logan – vocals on "Dreams Inside"

Production

- Ralph Patlan – engineer
- Rick Plester – mixing, mastering

== Charts ==
Chart (2006)	Peak position
Japanese Albums (Oricon)	67
