= Built to Destroy (Michael Schenker Group album) =

Studio album by The Michael Schenker Group
- Released: 2 September 1983
- Recorded: Ridge Farm (Rusper, England); Townhouse (London, England)
- Genre: Hard rock; heavy metal; pop metal
- Length: 41:54
- Label: Chrysalis
- Producer: MSG, Louis Austin

The Michael Schenker Group chronology
Assault Attack (1982)	Built to Destroy (1983)	Rock Will Never Die (1984)

Professional ratings
Review scores
Source	Rating
AllMusic	3/5 stars
Collector's Guide to Heavy Metal	9/10

Built to Destroy is the fourth studio album by the English hard rock band The Michael Schenker Group, released on 2 September 1983 in the UK and on 16 January 1984 in the US. Gary Barden returned to the group on vocals, following the departure of Graham Bonnet amidst tensions with Michael Schenker. This was the band's final studio album prior to their disbanding and Schenker moving on to form the McAuley Schenker Group with vocalist Robin McAuley. New material released under the Michael Schenker Group name would not appear for over a decade.

The song "Captain Nemo" is the theme song for Eddie Trunk's radio shows Friday Night Rocks on WAXQ and Trunk Nation on XM Radio's Hair Nation Channel.

== Track listing ==
=== (UK and Japan LP) ===
Side one
No.	Title	Writer(s)	Length
1.	"Rock My Nights Away"	Andy Nye, Gary Barden	4:09
2.	"I'm Gonna Make You Mine"	Nye, Barden, Michael Schenker, Ted McKenna	4:18
3.	"The Dogs of War"	Schenker, Barden	4:23
4.	"Systems Failing"	Schenker, Barden	4:25
5.	"Captain Nemo"	Schenker	3:22

Side two
No.	Title	Writer(s)	Length
6.	"Still Love That Little Devil"	Schenker, Barden	3:24
7.	"Red Sky"	Schenker, Barden, Chris Glen, McKenna, José Luis Campuzano	5:15
8.	"Time Waits (For No One)"	Nye, Barden	3:58
9.	"Walk the Stage"	Schenker, Barden	5:55
Total length:			41:54

=== (US Remix LP) ===
Side one
No.	Title	Writer(s)	Length
1.	"I'm Gonna Make You Mine"	Nye, Barden, Schenker, McKenna	4:33
2.	"Time Waits (For No One)"	Nye, Barden	4:06
3.	"Systems Failing"	Schenker, Barden	4:16
4.	"Rock Will Never Die (Walk the Stage)"	Schenker, Barden	5:40

Side two
No.	Title	Writer(s)	Length
5.	"Red Sky"	Schenker, Barden, Glen, McKenna, José Luis Campuzano	5:06
6.	"Rock My Nights Away"	Nye, Barden	4:37
7.	"Captain Nemo"	Schenker	3:22
8.	"The Dogs of War"	Schenker, Barden	4:52
9.	"Still Love That Little Devil"	Schenker, Barden	3:41
Total length:			40:18

- The 2009 EMI Remaster CD includes both UK and US mixes of all songs (18 tracks) with the UK ones listed first. The original title "Walk the Stage", then to be changed to "Rock Will Never Die", on this remaster is listed as "Rock Will Never Die (Walk the Stage)".
- The song "Walk the Stage" has various name changes for different releases:

Built to Destroy: "Walk the Stage" (UK), "Rock Will Never Die (Walk the Stage)" (US and worldwide); Rock Will Never Die (LP): "Rock Will Never Die"; Rock Will Never Die (VHS): "Dream On (Rock Will Never Die)".

== Personnel ==
The Michael Schenker Group

- Michael Schenker – guitars
- Gary Barden – vocals
- Chris Glen – bass
- Ted McKenna – drums
- Andy Nye – keyboards
- Derek St. Holmes – vocals on the American Remix of "Still Love That Little Devil"; Gary Barden sings the verses and chorus on the UK Mix.

Production

- Produced and mixed – MSG & Louis Austin
- Recorded and mixed at – Ridge Farm Studios Dorking
- Additional recording and mixing at – Townhouse Studios
- Engineer – Louis Austin
- Assistant engineer – Richard Manwaring
- Tape Operator – George Chambers
- Tape Operator – Gavin MacKillop
- Additional mixes at – RG Jones
- Mastered at – Townhouse Cutting Rooms
- Cover concept – Michael Schenker
- Art direction – John Pasche
- Cover photos – John Shaw
- Cover model – Caroline Dodd
- Inner sleeve photography – Brian Aris
- Project coordinator – Nigel Reeve
- Project coordinator – Hugh Gilmour
- Bonus tracks remixed at the Record Plant, New York City by Jack Douglas and mastered at Sterling Sound
- José Luis Campuzano, credited as co-writer of "Red Sky", is the bassist and singer of the Spanish heavy metal band Barón Rojo. He is also known as "Sherpa".

== Charts ==
Chart (1983)	Peak position
Japanese Albums (Oricon)	6
Swedish Albums (Sverigetopplistan)	32
UK Albums (OCC)	23
