= Heavy Hitters =

Studio album by Michael Schenker Group
- Released: 12 July 2005
- Studio: Office Studios, Van Nuys, California
- Genre: Hard rock
- Length: 49:38; 74:33 (2008 re-release)
- Label: Deadline/Cleopatra
- Producer: Bob Kulick, Brett Chassen, Brian Perera

Michael Schenker Group chronology
Arachnophobiac (2003)	Heavy Hitters (2005)	Tales of Rock'n'Roll (2006)

Michael Schenker chronology
The Endless Jam Continues (2005)	Heavy Hitters (2005)	Tales of Rock'n'Roll (2006)

2008 re-release cover
- "Doctor Doctor: The Kulick Sessions" with rounded title

2011 re-release cover
- By Invitation Only 2011 re-issue cover

Professional ratings
Review scores
Source	Rating
AllMusic	3.5/5 stars
AllMusic (2008 edition)	3.5/5 stars

Heavy Hitters is a 2005 album of cover songs by the Michael Schenker Group. Originally planned by Schenker as a collection of covers featuring himself and a "revolving all-star cast of guest musicians," the album was labeled and marketed as an MSG album, with the result that Schenker received only a flat fee.

In 2008, it was re-released as a Michael Schenker solo album under the title Doctor Doctor: The Kulick Sessions and included four additional tracks (1–2 and 13–14). A Deluxe Digital version of this release is available under the "Guitar Masters: The Kulick Sessions" title. This contains instrumental versions of all the songs on the album except 'Save Yourself'. The album was re-issued again in 2011 with the title By Invitation Only by the Store For Music label, including the song "Run to the Hills", which Schenker and McAuley had recorded for the Iron Maiden tribute album Numbers from the Beast.

== Track listings ==
=== Heavy Hitters ===
1. "All Shook Up" (Otis Blackwell; Elvis Presley) - 4:21 (Elvis Presley cover)
  - Joe Lynn Turner - vocals
  - Michael Schenker - lead guitar
  - Bob Kulick - rhythm guitar
  - Jeff Pilson - bass
  - Aynsley Dunbar - drums
2. "Blood of the Sun" (Felix Pappalardi; Gail Collins Pappalardi; Leslie West) - 3:52 (Leslie West/Mountain cover)
  - Leslie West - vocals
  - Michael Schenker - lead guitar
  - Bob Kulick - rhythm guitar
  - Rudy Sarzo - bass
  - Simon Wright - drums
3. "Doctor Doctor" (Michael Schenker; Phil Mogg) - 6:07 (UFO cover)
  - Jeff Scott Soto - vocals
  - Michael Schenker - lead guitar
  - Bob Kulick - rhythm guitar
  - Jeremy Rubolino - keyboards, strings arrangements
  - Marco Mendoza - bass
  - Brent Chassen - drums
4. "War Pigs" (Bill Ward; Geezer Butler; Ozzy Osbourne; Tony Iommi) - 7:24 (Black Sabbath cover)
  - Tim "Ripper" Owens - vocals
  - Michael Schenker - lead guitar
  - Bob Kulick - rhythm guitar
  - Mike Inez - bass
  - Aynsley Dunbar - drums
5. "I'm Not Talking" (Mose Allison) - 4:10 (Mose Allison cover)
  - Mark Slaughter - vocals
  - Michael Schenker - lead guitar
  - Bob Kulick - rhythm guitar
  - Jeff Pilson - bass
  - Aynsley Dunbar - drums
6. "Money" (Roger Waters) - 6:04 (Pink Floyd cover)
  - Tommy Shaw - vocals
  - Michael Schenker - lead guitar
  - Edgar Winter - sax
  - Tony Levin - bass
  - Mike Baird - drums
7. "Out in the Fields" (Gary Moore) - 4:25 (Gary Moore cover)
  - Gary Barden - vocals
  - Michael Schenker - lead guitar
  - Bob Kulick - rhythm guitar
  - Chuck Wright - bass
  - Brent Chassen - drums
8. "Hair of the Dog" (Dan McCafferty; Darrell Sweet; Manny Charlton; Pete Agnew) - 4:11 (Nazareth cover)
  - Paul Di'Anno - vocals
  - Michael Schenker - lead guitar
  - Bob Kulick - rhythm guitar
  - Phil Soussan - bass
  - Vinny Appice - drums
9. "I Don't Live Today" (Jimi Hendrix) - 3:54 (The Jimi Hendrix Experience cover)
  - Sebastian Bach - vocals
  - Michael Schenker - lead guitar
  - Bob Kulick - rhythm guitar
  - Tony Franklin - bass
  - Eric Singer - drums
10. "Politician" (Jack Bruce; Pete Brown) - 5:10 (Cream cover)
  - Jeff Pilson - vocals, bass
  - Michael Schenker - guitars
  - Brent Chassen - drums

=== Doctor Doctor: The Kulick Sessions (2008 re-release) ===
1. "Save Yourself" (Robin McAuley; Michael Schenker) - 5:55 (with Robin McAuley)
2. "Finding My Way" (Alex Lifeson; Geddy Lee) - 5:19 (Rush cover)
  - Sebastian Bach - vocals
  - Michael Schenker - lead guitar
  - Bob Kulick - rhythm guitar
  - Tony Franklin - bass
  - Eric Singer - drums
3. "All Shook Up"
4. "Blood of the Sun"
5. "Doctor Doctor"
6. "War Pigs"
7. "I'm Not Talking"
8. "Money"
9. "Out in the Fields"
10. "Hair of the Dog"
11. "I Don't Live Today"
12. "Politician"
13. "Doctor Doctor" - 6:16 (instrumental version)
14. "War Pigs" - 7:25 (instrumental version)

=== Guitar Masters - The Kulick Sessions (Deluxe Digital Version) ===
1. "Save Yourself"
2. "Finding my Way"
3. "All Shook Up"
4. "Blood of the Sun"
5. "Doctor Doctor"
6. "War Pigs"
7. "I'm Not Talking"
8. "Money"
9. "Out in the Fields"
10. "Hair of the Dog"
11. "I Don't Live Today"
12. "Politician"
13. "Doctor Doctor" (instrumental version)
14. "War Pigs" (instrumental version)
15. "Hair of the Dog" - 4.14 (Instrumental version) (Bonus Track)
16. "I Don't Live Today" - 4.20 (Instrumental version) (Bonus Track)
17. "All Shook Up" - 4.26 (Instrumental version) (Bonus Track)
18. "Money" - 6.10 (Instrumental version) (Bonus Track)
19. "Blood of the Sun" - 3.57 (Instrumental version) (Bonus Track)
20. "Out in the Fields" - 4.30 (Instrumental version) (Bonus Track)
21. "I'm Not Talking" - 4.16 (Instrumental version) (Bonus Track)
22. "Politician" - 5.49 (Instrumental version) (Bonus Track)

=== By Invitation Only (2011 re-release) ===
1. "Run to the Hills" (Iron Maiden)
  - Vocals: Robin McAuley
  - Rhythm Guitar: Pete Fletcher (Pygmy Love Circus)
  - Bass: Tony Franklin (ex-The Firm, Blue Murder)
  - Drums: Brian Tichy (Whitesnake, Billy Idol)
2. "Save Yourself" (McAuley Schenker Group)
  - with: Robin McAuley
3. "Finding My Way" (Rush)
  - with: Sebastian Bach (ex-Skid Row)
4. "All Shook Up" (Elvis Presley)
  - Vocals: Joe Lynn Turner (ex-Deep Purple, Rainbow)
  - Bass: Jeff Pilson (ex-Dokken, Dio, Foreigner)
  - Drums: Aynsley Dunbar (ex-Whitesnake, UFO, Journey)
5. "Blood of the Sun" (Leslie West)
  - Vocals: Leslie West (Mountain)
  - Bass: Rudy Sarzo (Blue Öyster Cult, ex-Dio, Quiet Riot)
  - Drums: Simon Wright (Dio, ex-AC/DC)
6. "Doctor Doctor" (UFO)
  - Vocals: Jeff Scott Soto (Talisman, ex-Yngwie Malmsteen)
  - Bass: Marco Mendoza (Soul Sirkus, Whitesnake)
  - Drums: Brett Chassen (Bret Michaels Band)
7. "War Pigs" (Black Sabbath)
  - Vocals: Tim "Ripper" Owens (Dio's Disciples, Yngwie Malmsteen, Beyond Fear, ex-Judas Priest, Iced Earth)
  - Drums: Aynsley Dunbar (ex-Journey, Whitesnake, UFO)
  - Bass: Mike Inez (ex-Ozzy Osbourne, Alice In Chains)
8. "I'm Not Talking" (Mose Allison)
  - Vocals: Mark Slaughter (Slaughter)
  - Drums: Aynsley Dunbar
  - Bass: Jeff Pilson
9. "Money" (Pink Floyd)
  - Vocals: Tommy Shaw (Styx)
  - Sax: Edgar Winter
  - Bass: Tony Levin (Peter Gabriel, King Crimson)
  - Drums: Mike Baird (Journey)
10. "Out in the Fields" (Gary Moore)
  - Vocals: Gary Barden (MSG)
  - Bass: Chuck Wright (Quiet Riot, ex-Alice Cooper)
  - Drums: Brett Chassen
11. "Hair of the Dog" (Nazareth)
  - Vocals: Paul Di'Anno (ex-Iron Maiden)
  - Bass: Phil Soussan (ex-Ozzy Osbourne)
  - Drums: Vinny Appice (ex-Black Sabbath, Dio)
12. "I Don't Live Today" (Jimi Hendrix)
  - Vocals: Sebastian Bach (ex-Skid Row)
  - Drums: Eric Singer (KISS)
  - Bass: Tony Franklin (ex-The Firm, Blue Murder)
13. "Politician" (Cream)
  - Vocals/Bass: Jeff Pilson (ex-Dokken, Dio)
  - Drums: Brett Chassen

== Credits ==
- Bob Kulick - producer, arrangements, mixing
- Brett Chassen - producer, engineer, mixing
- Jeremy Rubolino - keyboards, strings production, digital editing
- Bruce Bouillet, Bob Held, Billy Sherwood - engineers
- Kris Solem - mastering
- Brian Perera - executive producer
