= List of Juicy Lucy members =

Juicy Lucy were a British blues rock band based in London. Formed in September 1969, the group originally consisted of former Misunderstood members Glenn Ross Campbell (on steel guitar and mandolin) and Chris Mercer (on saxophone and keyboards), alongside lead vocalist Ray Owen, guitarist Neil Hubbard (formerly of Bluesology), and drummer Pete Dobson. After several lineup changes, the band broke up for the first time in 1972, although later reformed with various members in 1994–1997 and then 2004–2018. At the time of its final dissolution, Juicy Lucy featured vocalist and guitarist Steve "Mr. Fish" Fishwick (who joined in 2004 and took over vocal duties from Owen in 2009), drummer Paul "Fletch" Fletcher (also constant since the 2004 reformation), and bassist Mike Phillips (who joined in 2013).

== History ==
Juicy Lucy were originally formed in September 1969 by former Misunderstood members Glenn Ross Campbell (on steel guitar and mandolin) and Chris Mercer (on saxophone and keyboards). The original lineup, which recorded the band's self-titled debut album, also featured lead vocalist Ray Owen, guitarist Neil Hubbard and drummer Pete Dobson. In early 1970, Owen was replaced by Paul Williams, formerly of Zoot Money's Big Roll Band and John Mayall & the Bluesbreakers. Shortly thereafter, Hubbard and Dobson also left the band, replaced by Micky Moody (formerly with Zoot Money) and Rod Coombes (formerly with Jeff Beck), respectively. This lineup released Lie Back and Enjoy It, before former Fat Mattress bassist Jim Leverton replaced Ellis for 1971's Get a Whiff of This.

Shortly after the album's summer release, founding members Campbell and Mercer left Juicy Lucy, with the former claiming to be "disillusioned" with the band's lack of commercial success. With just Williams and Moody left, the band was rebuilt with the addition of former Blodwyn Pig rhythm section Andy Pyle (bass) and Ron Berg (drums), plus keyboardist Jean Roussel. This lineup released Pieces in early 1972, before Dave Tedstone was added on rhythm guitar in the spring. For a final European tour in the summer, Williams, Moody and Tedstone were joined by Chris Stewart on bass, Mike Deacon on keyboards and Terry Stannard on drums. The group disbanded shortly thereafter, at which point Williams joined Tempest and Moody formed Snafu with vocalist Bobby Harrison.

In 1994, original singer Ray Owen formed a new incarnation of Juicy Lucy with guitarist Mike Jarvis, bassist Andy Doughty and drummer Spencer Blackledge, releasing the album Here She Comes Again in 1995. This lineup disbanded in 1997 and Owen began working with guitarist Steve "Mr. Fish" Fishwick, although a legal dispute over the band's name resulted in a name change to Ray Owen's Moon. During this enforced period of inactivity, a 1996 album called Blue Thunder recorded by Williams and Moody with bassist Peter Stroud, keyboardist David Hentschel and drummer Gary Husband was reissued under the Juicy Lucy name in 1998. After the dispute was settled, Owen and Fishwick reformed Juicy Lucy in mid-2004, joined by bassist Colin Fudge and drummer Paul "Fletch" Fletcher.

The relaunched Juicy Lucy released the EP Raiding the Fruit Bowl in 2005, followed by the first studio album since 1994, Do That and You'll Lose It, the next year. In July 2008, Fudge left the band and was replaced by their manager and producer, James Morris. Just a few weeks later, Owen was hospitalised with a collapsed lung, at which point Fishwick took over lead vocal duties temporarily. Owen returned in November, but was hospitalised again later and ultimately decided to step down from the group in January 2009. By June 2012, Morris had also decided to leave, with Frank Cokayne taking his place. By January 2013 he had been replaced by Len Surtees, who then made way for Mike Phillips in April. In February 2018, Fishwick announced on Facebook that Phillips had left Juicy Lucy.

Despite initially claiming that he and Fletcher were looking for a new bassist, Fishwick announced in May 2018 that Juicy Lucy would be taking "a break to regroup". He later added that he had parted ways with Fletcher. On 31 October 2018, Ray Owen died. Paul Williams died just a few months later on 1 March 2019.

== Members ==
Image	Name	Years active	Instruments	Release contributions
	Glenn Ross Campbell	1969–1971	steel guitar; mandolin; marimba; backing and occasional lead vocals	Juicy Lucy (1969); Lie Back and Enjoy It (1970); Get a Whiff of This (1971)
	Chris Mercer	1969–1971	saxophone; keyboards	Juicy Lucy (1969); Lie Back and Enjoy It (1970); Get a Whiff of This (1971)
	Keith Ellis	1969–1971 (died 1978)	bass; backing and occasional lead vocals	Juicy Lucy (1969); Lie Back and Enjoy It (1970)
	Ray Owen	1969–1970; 1994–1997; 2004–2009 (died 2018)	lead vocals; guitar	Juicy Lucy (1969); Here She Comes Again (1995); Raiding the Fruit Bowl (2005); Do That and You'll Lose It (2006)
	Neil Hubbard	1969–1970	guitar	Juicy Lucy (1969)
	Pete Dobson	1969–1970	drums; percussion	Juicy Lucy (1969)
	Paul Williams	1970–1972; 1997–1998 (died 2019)	lead vocals; congas	Lie Back and Enjoy It (1970); Get a Whiff of This (1971); Pieces (1972); Blue Thunder (1998)
	Micky Moody	1970–1972; 1997–1998	guitar	Lie Back and Enjoy It (1970); Get a Whiff of This (1971); Pieces (1972); Blue Thunder (1998)
	Rod Coombes	1970–1971	drums; percussion	Lie Back and Enjoy It (1970); Get a Whiff of This (1971)
	Jim Leverton	1971	bass	Get a Whiff of This (1971)
	Andy Pyle	1971–1972	bass	Pieces (1972)
	Ron Berg	1971–1972	drums	Pieces (1972)
	Jean Roussel	1971–1972	keyboards	Pieces (1972)
	Dave Tedstone	1972	rhythm guitar	none
	Chris Stewart	1972	bass	none
	Mike Deacon	1972	keyboards	none
	Terry Stannard	1972 (died 2019)	drums	none
	Mike Jarvis	1994–1997	guitar	Here She Comes Again (1995)
	Andy Doughty	1994–1997	bass	Here She Comes Again (1995)
	Spencer Blackledge	1994–1997	drums	Here She Comes Again (1995)
	Steve "Mr. Fish" Fishwick	2004–2018	guitar; vocals (lead from 2009, backing beforehand)	Raiding the Fruit Bowl (2005); Do That and You'll Lose It (2006)
	Paul "Fletch" Fletcher	2004–2018	drums	Raiding the Fruit Bowl (2005); Do That and You'll Lose It (2006)
	Colin Fudge	2004–2008	bass	Raiding the Fruit Bowl (2005); Do That and You'll Lose It (2006)
	James Morris	2008–2012	bass	none
	Frank Cokayne	2012–2013	bass; backing vocals	none
	Len Surtees	2013	bass	none
	Mike Phillips	2013–2018	bass	none

== Lineups ==
Period	Members	Releases
September 1969 – early 1970	Ray Owen – lead vocals; Neil Hubbard – guitar; Glenn Campbell – steel guitar, mandolin, vocals; Keith Ellis – bass, vocals; Chris Mercer – saxophone, keyboards; Pete Dobson – drums, percussion	Juicy Lucy (1969)
Early – spring 1970	Paul Williams – lead vocals, congas, piano; Neil Hubbard – guitar; Glenn Campbell – steel guitar, mandolin, vocals; Keith Ellis – bass, vocals; Chris Mercer – saxophone, keyboards; Pete Dobson – drums, percussion	none
Spring 1970 – early 1971	Paul Williams – lead vocals, congas, piano; Micky Moody – guitar; Glenn Campbell – steel guitar, mandolin, vocals; Keith Ellis – bass, vocals; Chris Mercer – saxophone, keyboards; Rod Coombes – drums, percussion	Lie Back and Enjoy It (1970)
Early – July 1971	Paul Williams – lead vocals, congas, piano; Micky Moody – guitar; Glenn Campbell – steel guitar, mandolin, vocals; Jim Leverton – bass; Chris Mercer – saxophone, keyboards; Rod Coombes – drums, percussion	Get a Whiff of This (1971)
July 1971 – spring 1972	Paul Williams – vocals, congas, piano; Micky Moody – guitar, steel guitar; Andy Pyle – bass; Jean Roussel – keyboards; Ron Berg – drums	Pieces (1972)
Spring – summer 1972	Paul Williams – vocals, congas, piano; Micky Moody – lead guitar, steel guitar; Dave Tedstone – rhythm guitar; Andy Pyle – bass; Jean Roussel – keyboards; Ron Berg – drums	none
Summer 1972	Paul Williams – vocals, congas, piano; Micky Moody – lead guitar, steel guitar; Dave Tedstone – rhythm guitar; Chris Stewart – bass; Mike Deacon – keyboards; Terry Stannard – drums	none
Band inactive summer 1972 – autumn 1994
Autumn 1994 – 1997	Ray Owen – vocals, guitar; Mike Jarvis – guitar; Andy Doughty – bass; Spencer Blackledge – drums	Here She Comes Again (1995)
Band inactive 1997 – mid-2004
Mid-2004 – July 2008	Ray Owen – lead vocals, guitar; Steve Fishwick – guitar, backing vocals; Colin Fudge – bass; Paul Fletcher – drums	Raiding the Fruit Bowl (2005); Do That and You'll Lose It (2006)
July 2008 – January 2009	Ray Owen – lead vocals, guitar; Steve Fishwick – guitar, backing vocals; James Morris – bass; Paul Fletcher – drums	none
January 2009 – June 2012	Steve Fishwick – vocals, guitar; James Morris – bass; Paul Fletcher – drums	none
June 2012 – January 2013	Steve Fishwick – vocals, guitar; Frank Cokayne – bass, backing vocals; Paul Fletcher – drums	none
January – April 2013	Steve Fishwick – vocals, guitar; Len Surtees – bass; Paul Fletcher – drums	none
April 2013 – February 2018	Steve Fishwick – vocals, guitar; Mike Phillips – bass; Paul Fletcher – drums	none
