= Richard Brown =

Richard Brown or Browne may refer to:

== Arts and entertainment ==
- Rich Brown (blues musician), American blues musician and singer
- Richard Brown, British musician, original drummer for the new wave-post-punk band Modern English
- Richard Brown (producer), Scottish television producer
- Richard "Rabbit" Brown (1880–1937), early US blues musician and composer
- Richard Shaw Brown (born 1947), lead singer of The Misunderstood
- Richard Browne (painter) (1776–1824), early Australian convict artist and illustrator
- Richard Browne (fl 1614–1629), English composer and organist
- Richard Browne (c.1630–1664), English composer and organist
- Richard Browne (d. 1710), English composer and organist

== Sportsmen ==
- Cam Brown (ice hockey) (Richard Cameron Brown, born 1969), retired ice hockey left winger
- Richard Brown (center) (1907–1990), played for Portsmouth Spartans
- Richard Brown (cricketer) (1811–?), English cricketer and clergyman
- Dick Brown (footballer) (1911–1985), English footballer
- Richard Brown (footballer) (born 1967), retired English footballer
- Richard Brown (linebacker) (born 1965), former American football linebacker
- Richard Brown (rugby union) (born 1984), Australian rugby union footballer
- Ricky Brown (born 1983), American football player
- Ricky Brown (tennis) (born 1967), retired American tennis player
- Stub Brown (Richard P. Brown, 1870–1948), pitcher in Major League Baseball
- Richard Browne (athletics) (born 1991), USA sprint runner and high jumper
- Richard Browne (footballer) (born 1946), Australian rules footballer for Hawthorn
- Richard Browne (hurler) (born 1962), retired Irish sportsman
- Ricky Browne (born 1950), Australian rules footballer for Geelong
- Dick Brown (rugby league), rugby league player in Australia

== Politicians ==
- Dick Brown (politician) (1887–1971), member of the Queensland Legislative Assembly
- Rich Brown (Michigan politician) (born 1956), member of the Michigan House of Representatives
- Richard Brown (Canadian politician) (born 1956), Canadian politician in Prince Edward Island
- Richard Brown (lawyer) (1932–2019), American attorney and politician from the state of New York
- Richard Brown (Ohio politician), member of the Ohio House of Representatives
- Richard Brown (Missouri politician), member of the Missouri House of Representatives
- Richard Brown (New Hampshire politician), member of the New Hampshire House of Representatives
- Richard C. Brown (1939–2004), United States Ambassador to Uruguay, 1990–1993
- Richard Lewis Brown (1854–1948), builder and state politician in Florida
- Richard L. Brown (1925–1991), Florida House of Representatives
- Sir Richard Browne, 1st Baronet, of Deptford (c. 1605–1682/83), English ambassador to the court of France
- Sir Richard Browne, 1st Baronet, of London (c. 1610–1669), Major-General in the English Parliamentary army; Lord Mayor of London
- Richard Browne (died 1604) (c. 1538–1604), MP for Lichfield, Newton (Isle of Wight), Cirencester and Harwich
- Richard Browne (Sussex MP) (died 1614?), MP for Steyning, Arundel, Lewes, Gatton and Midhurst

== Others ==
- Richard Brown (captain) (1753–1833), shipmaster and friend of Robert Burns
- Richard Brown (film studies educator) (born c. 1944), instructor at The New School and the New York University School of Continuing Education
- Richard Brown (journalist) (born c. 1952), Canadian television journalist
- Richard Brown (professor) (c. 1712–1780?), academic at the University of Oxford
- Richard Brown (transport executive) (born 1953), British chief transport executive & chairman of Eurostar
- Richard Brown, openSUSE Chairman
- Richard D. Brown (born 1939), American historian and professor emeritus at the University of Connecticut
- Richard H. Brown, American businessman and CEO
- Richard J. C. Brown, British metrologist who introduced the SI prefixes ronna, quetta, ronto and quecto
- Richard Hart Brown (1941–2005), Intraoperative Neurological Monitoring founder and amusement ride safety expert
- R. Jess Brown (1912–1989) American civil rights lawyer
- Richard S. Brown (born 1946), chief judge of the Wisconsin Court of Appeals
- Richard Browne (physician), English physician
- Sir Richard Browne, 2nd Baronet (before 1634–1684), barrister

== See also ==
- Rick Brown (disambiguation)
- Dick Brown (disambiguation)
- Richard Broun (disambiguation)
- Brown (surname)
