= Ballads & Blues 1982–1994 =

Compilation album by Gary Moore
- Released: 14 November 1994
- Recorded: 1982–1994
- Genre: Blues rock, hard rock
- Length: 70:59
- Label: Charisma
- Producer: Gary Moore, James Barton, Peter Collins, Jeff Glixman, Steve Levine, Mike Stone, Ian Taylor

Gary Moore chronology
Around the Next Dream (1994)	Ballads & Blues 1982–1994 (1994)	Blues for Greeny (1995)

Ballads & Blues 1982–1994 is a compilation album by Northern Irish rock guitarist, singer and songwriter Gary Moore. Released in 1994, the album encompasses the softer, romantic ballads and blues songs Moore had recorded since 1982. It contains three previously unreleased tracks; of these, the song "One Day" is actually an outtake from the album Around the Next Dream, recorded by supergroup BBM, of which Moore was a member.

Professional ratings
Review scores
Source	Rating
AllMusic	2/5 stars

== Track listing ==
All tracks are written by Gary Moore, except where noted.

No.	Title	Writer(s)	Length
1.	"Always Gonna Love You" (from Corridors of Power, 1982)		3:54
2.	"Still Got the Blues (For You)" (single version, from Still Got the Blues, 1990)		4:10
3.	"Empty Rooms" (from Run for Cover, 1985)	Moore, Neil Carter	4:15
4.	"Parisienne Walkways" (live; from Blues Alive, 1993)	Moore, Phil Lynott	6:47
5.	"One Day" (previously unreleased)		4:00
6.	"Separate Ways" (from After Hours, 1992)		4:54
7.	"Story of the Blues" (from After Hours, 1992)		6:39
8.	"Crying in the Shadows" (B-side to "Over the Hills and Far Away" single, 1986)		5:00
9.	"With Love (Remember)" (previously unreleased)		7:05
10.	"Midnight Blues" (from Still Got the Blues, 1990)		4:58
11.	"Falling in Love with You" (single version, from Corridors of Power, 1982)		4:05
12.	"Jumpin' at Shadows" (from After Hours, 1992)	Duster Bennett	4:21
13.	"Blues for Narada" (instrumental; previously unreleased)		7:40
14.	"Johnny Boy" (from Wild Frontier, 1987)		3:11

== Sales and certifications ==
Certifications for Ballads & Blues 1982–1994
Region	Certification	Certified units/sales
Finland (Musiikkituottajat)	Gold	31,093
Norway (IFPI Norway)	Gold	25,000^{*}
Spain (PROMUSICAE)	Gold	50,000^{^}
Switzerland (IFPI Switzerland)	Gold	25,000^{^}
United Kingdom (BPI)	Gold	100,000^{^}
^{*} Sales figures based on certification alone.^{^} Shipments figures based on certification alone.
