= A Different Beat (Gary Moore album) =

Studio album by Gary Moore
- Released: 27 September 1999
- Recorded: 1998
- Studio: Marcus Recording Studios, London
- Genre: Experimental pop; dance; rock; drum and bass; electronic; blues
- Length: 64:54
- Label: Castle; Raw Power
- Producer: Gary Moore; Ian Taylor

Gary Moore chronology
Blood of Emeralds (1999)	A Different Beat (1999)	Back to the Blues (2001)

A Different Beat is the twelfth solo studio album by Irish guitarist Gary Moore, released by Castle Music in September 1999. Produced by Moore with Ian Taylor, the album saw Moore continue to jettison his familiar blues and hard rock stylings work for a more experimental pop approach, following Dark Days in Paradise (1997). The musician was inspired by modern dance music and sought to create an album that fused dance rhythms with guitar work, and collaborated with musicians Roger King and the E-Z Rollers to help him achieve this.

The album is characterised by its usage of keyboards, loops, samples, programmed dance beats and experiments in drum and bass, though also incorporates Moore's bluesy guitar solos. Stylistic comparisons were drawn with Apollo 440 and Fatboy Slim, the latter of whom was the subject of the tribute track "Fatboy", while Moore also recorded a cover of Jimi Hendrix's "Fire". On release, A Different Beat was another commercial disappointment for Moore and baffled his fanbase, although some music critics praised Moore for tasking musical risks with the album. The guitarist later disowned the album.

== Background and recording ==
Though known for his hard rock work in the 1970s and 80s, Gary Moore's blues-based album Still Got the Blues (1990) was the biggest critical and commercial success of his career, inspiring the guitarist to continue the direction on his next albums, After Hours (1992), Blues Alive (1993) and Blues for Greeny (1995). Although he helped revive the popularity of blues, he abruptly changed direction for Dark Days in Paradise (1997), an experimental pop album which featured influences of Britpop and electronic music. Although the record baffled Moore's fanbase and sold poorly, the musician continued his musical experimentation for its follow-up, A Different Beat.

Moore was influenced by the rhythms of modern dance music, having been drawn to the genre by his younger girlfriend. He noted "it was on the radio, and it was exciting", and conceived A Different Beat as a way to create dance music with the guitar, which he said "hadn't really been done". The different tempos required Moore to adapt his guitar style, and he collaborated with the E-Z Rollers and Roger King to help him achieve this. He sought out the former group after hearing one of their records and took a demo to their flat in mid-1998; he recalled he was "really shitting myself, wondering what they were gonna think. But they loved it." In a 2006 interview, he said: "I took a drum loop from a record and I had to go to this flat in Docklands and play what I'd done to Rob Playford, Goldie's producer, for approval. It was heavy-duty stuff. He was in this flat full of guys with their arms folded and they went, 'Yeah, it’s better than we thought.' I was really out of my depth, man."

Recorded in 1998 at Marcus Recording Studios in London, the album was co-produced by Moore with Ian Taylor with the latter also acting as engineer, while King provided programming and keyboard work and the E-Z Rollers created a remix of "Can't Help Myself", the original version of which also appears on the album. Two tracks, "Worry No More" and "Fire", feature Gary Husband on drums. During one session, the neck pickup on Moore's Fiesta Red Fender Stratocaster broke, requiring his guitar tech Graham Lilley to send it to Seymour Duncan for repair.

== Composition ==
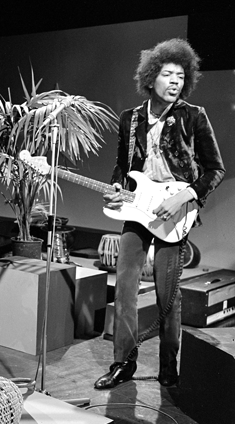
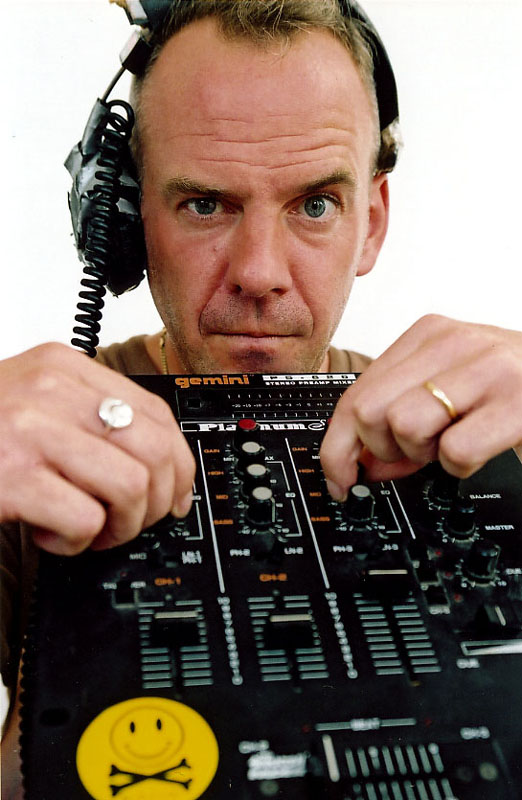
The album includes a Jimi Hendrix (left) cover and tribute to Fatboy Slim (right).

A Different Beat moves Moore away from his familiar style of rock music towards a groove-based, dance-oriented style. Tim Jones of Record Collector called the album a straight-up dance album that exemplifies "a new, energising guitar/electro-beat, albeit within a bluesy setting", and felt the musician gives dance music "his own cutting-edged treatment". The Irish Times named it an experimental pop record, similarly to Dark Days in Paradise. The music features loops, samples, dance beats, programmed rhythms, and inimitable melodies, and works in elements of rock, soul, funk, country, and drum and bass. Despite the experimentation, the album features some of Moore's trademark guitar solos over the dance beats, while his mid-Atlantic singing accent is also retained. In an interview for Friday Rock Show, the musician considered his change in direction be "no big deal", adding: "I always do what I feel like and there's enough people out there making the same record over and over again. They don't need me to do it."

"Lost in Your Love" features impassioned vocals and instrumentation, while "Surrender" is "blissed-out" and explores "the other end of the emotional scale entirely." "Fatboy" is a lighthearted tribute to Fatboy Slim, one of Moore's main influences for the album, and was built around a riff that he wrote after reading an interview with the producer. Moore admired Slim for the "60s, sunny optimism to his music that makes you feel good" and expressed a wish to work with him. The guitarist's cover of Hendrix's "Fire" is fast-paced; he credited the original version as a predecessor to the album's style, saying: "It's got a jungley rhythm, and when he made Electric Ladyland, he had a house beat, flashing lights–a rave! He also rapped over a lot of beats, so he was the first. If he was around today, he'd be into dance." "Bring My Baby Back" is a pictorial description of "a jilted lover's impending train ride to attempt a rescue of his former love."

== Release and reception ==
Professional ratings
Review scores
Source	Rating
AllMusic	3/5 stars
Burton Mail	3/5 stars
Encyclopedia of Popular Music	2/5 stars

A Different Beat was Moore's first album after leaving Virgin Records. Instead, he signed to Castle Music, who released the record on their Raw Power imprint on 27 September 1999. In the United States, the album's release was part of Castle's Midem 2000 campaign. In his Record Collector article, Jones predicted the album could further baffle "some die-hard metal and blues aficionados" after Jeff Beck's experiments with dance music earlier in 1999 on Who Else!, though felt that the enthusiastic audience for Moore's Shepherd's Bush Empire gig in October could ensure Beck "should have nothing to worry about." However, as with Dark Days in Paradise, the album did not significantly engage Moore's audience, and only reached number 133 on the UK Albums Chart. Drummer Darrin Mooney joined Moore on the accompanying tour and remained his drummer into the 2000s."

In their review of A Different Beat, AllMusic commended Moore's "courage to leap into the relative unknown", deeming it completely unlike his prior work and speculating whether the change in direction was fuelled by "the new-found freedom" he felt after leaving Virgin, alongside his "obvious affinity with outfits along the lines of Apollo 440 and Fatboy Slim". They praised the guitarist's synthesis of rock and dance music, adding that "hearing Moore's fretwork gymnastics over contemporary dance beats is a totally unique experience." Andrew Hirst of the Huddersfield Daily Examiner noted Moore's stylistic expansion into drum and bass and hip hop, writing: "From mean and moody blues-wailing through soul, rock and funk to rootsy country, every track turns out to be a different beat." However, they questioned its commercial viability. Burton Mail largely credited King's programming and keyboards for helping Moore update his sound, and praised the latter for making "a considerable effort to provide his fans with a degree of variety," while Birmingham Evening Mail deemed the album to be "an eye-opener" and praised Moore "for recognising the current music trends and attempting to adapt his hard rockin' blues to them."

Moore later disowned the album, and felt he had "painted [himself] into a corner" and bemused his fanbase in his usage of drum loops and samples. Gavin Martin felt Moore had been "stung" by the critical reception to the "forward-thinking" album. In 2001, the musician commented that in attempting "to marry guitar with dance rhythms" on A Different Beat, "you're really crucified before you start. People who would be into what I do would probably hate those rhythms and the people into dance music would probably hate me!" In a later interview with Classic Rock, he commented: "I'd wondered why there wasn’t any guitar on that sort of dance music, and I probably found out the hard way". More recently, Colin Larkin of The Encyclopedia of Popular Music noted the employment of "dance rhythms over regular rock structures" and praised Moore's guitar playing for being "as sharp and fluid as ever", but criticised the lyrics for descending into cliché. MusicOMH writer Ben Hogwood wrote that despite the album's experiments in drum and bass, it was "not doomed to complete failure, thanks to the guitarist's uncommon ability to play himself out of trouble".

== Re-release ==
Moore resumed working with a breakbeat on the song "Looking at Your Picture", first released posthumously on the outtakes album How Blue Can You Get (2021); reviewing the set for MusicOHM, Hogwood commented on the song's similarity to A Different Beat, which he deemed "Moore’s interesting if uneven excursion into drum and bass". Following this, A Different Beat was included in the four-CD box set The Sanctuary Years: 1999–2004, released through BMG Records in 2022. In his review for Classic Rock, Hugh Fielder considers A Different Beat a continuation of the detour Moore began with Dark Days in Paradise, "setting his bluesy guitar against an electronica backing and sampled vocals." He wrote: "Viewed from a distance of a quarter of a century, it's not as radical as it sounded back then. The drum and bass that propels Moore through 'Lost in Your Love' and the cover of Jimi Hendrix's 'Fire' is bold, as is the lengthy, ambient 'Surrender'. But the purists will still hate it."

== Track listing ==
All songs written by Gary Moore, except where noted.

1. "Go on Home" – 4:21
2. "Lost in Your Love" – 5:59
3. "Worry No More" – 5:07
4. "Fire" (Jimi Hendrix) – 2:50
5. "Surrender" – 9:38
6. "House Full of Blues" – 4:49
7. "Bring My Baby Back" – 4:50
8. "Can't Help Myself" – 5:52
9. "Fatboy" – 3:27
10. "We Want Love" – 5:43
11. "Can't Help Myself" (E-Z Rollers Remix) (includes hidden track "Surrender (Reprise)") – 12:18

== Personnel ==
Adapted from the liner notes of A Different Beat

- Gary Moore – vocals, guitar, bass, keyboards, mixing
- Roger King – keyboards, programming, mixing
- Gary Husband – drums (tracks 3 & 4)
- Phil Nicholls – programming
- E-Z Rollers – mixing, remixing, co-production
- Bill Smith Studio – design
- Ram & Fab – photography

== Charts ==
Chart (1999)	Peak position
UK Albums Chart	133
