= Blues for Greeny =

Studio album by Gary Moore
- Released: 29 May 1995
- Genres: Blues rock, hard rock
- Length: 55:47
- Label: Charisma
- Producers: Gary Moore, Ian Taylor

Gary Moore chronology
Ballads & Blues 1982–1994 (1994)	Blues for Greeny (1995)	Dark Days in Paradise (1997)

Singles from Blues for Greeny
- 1. "Need Your Love So Bad" Released: 5 June 1995

Professional ratings
Review scores
Source	Rating
AllMusic	3/5 stars
sputnikmusic	4.0/5 stars
The Penguin Guide to Blues Recordings	3/4 stars

Blues for Greeny is the tenth solo studio by Irish guitarist and singer Gary Moore, released in 1995. It is a tribute to Peter Green, guitarist and founder member of the band Fleetwood Mac. The album was recorded using the same 1959 Les Paul Standard Green played on the original tracks. Green loaned and then sold the guitar to Moore after leaving Fleetwood Mac.

== Background ==
Gary Moore was heavily influenced by Peter Green's guitar playing from an early age. As a teenager, Moore first encountered Green through his performances with John Mayall & the Bluesbreakers. He later became even more impressed with his playing after attending concerts by Fleetwood Mac, the band Green had founded. The two musicians became closer in 1970, when Moore's band, Skid Row, performed alongside Fleetwood Mac. Green admired Moore's playing and helped Skid Row establish themselves in the United Kingdom, including assisting the band in securing a recording contract.

In the early 1970s, Moore purchased Green's 1959 Gibson Les Paul Standard guitar. The instrument subsequently became known as "Greeny" and was renowned for producing the distinctive guitar tone associated with Green's playing. In a 1995 interview, Moore recalled that Green wanted the guitar to go to a good home, and that he purchased it using money from selling his own instrument.

Following the release of Still Got the Blues in 1990, Moore expanded his musical career into blues and continued exploring the genre through albums such as After Hours and Blues Alive. However, he later felt that his music had gradually shifted towards a heavier rock sound and guitar-oriented performances, moving away from the essence of traditional blues. Consequently, he sought to return to his musical roots by recording a more restrained and traditional blues album, deciding to focus on the music of Peter Green, an idea he had considered for many years.

Blues for Greeny was conceived against this background and released in 1995. Moore described the album not simply as a tribute, but as an expression of gratitude for the musical and personal support he had received from Green. The track selection focused on songs from Green's periods with John Mayall and Fleetwood Mac. Alongside well-known compositions such as "Need Your Love So Bad", the album also included lesser-known tracks such as "Love That Burns" and "If You Be My Baby". Moore explained that the songs were arranged according to the overall musical flow of the album rather than in chronological order.

The album was recorded using Green's former "Greeny" guitar. Rather than attempting to reproduce Green's playing exactly, Moore sought to respect the atmosphere of the original recordings while incorporating elements of his own playing style. He also recorded the instrumental performances largely with the musicians playing together, with some vocals recorded simultaneously with the live performances. Moore described it as the studio album closest to a live performance among his releases. This recording approach and the restrained guitar sound reflected his admiration for Green's blues playing and his own musical interpretation of it.

== Track listing ==
Blues for Greeny track listing
No.	Title	Writer(s)	Original artist	Length
1.	"If You Be My Baby"	Peter Green; Clifford Adams	Fleetwood Mac	6:38
2.	"Long Grey Mare"	Peter Green	Fleetwood Mac	2:04
3.	"Merry-Go-Round"	Peter Green	Fleetwood Mac	4:14
4.	"I Loved Another Woman"	Peter Green	Fleetwood Mac	3:05
5.	"Need Your Love So Bad" (Sourced from Fleetwood Mac's 1968 cover of the song)	Little Willie John; Mertis John Jr.	Little Willie John	7:54
6.	"The Same Way"	Peter Green	John Mayall & the Bluesbreakers	2:35
7.	"The Supernatural"	Peter Green	John Mayall & the Bluesbreakers	3:00
8.	"Driftin'" (Recorded in 1967; The Original Fleetwood Mac was an archival album)	Peter Green	Fleetwood Mac	8:29
9.	"Showbiz Blues"	Peter Green	Fleetwood Mac	4:08
10.	"Love That Burns"	Peter Green; Clifford Adams	Fleetwood Mac	6:28
11.	"Looking For Somebody"	Peter Green	Fleetwood Mac	7:12
Total length:				55:47

Bonus tracks on the 2003 digitally remastered edition
No.	Title	Writer(s)	Original artist	Length
12.	"The World Keeps On Turnin'"	Peter Green	Fleetwood Mac	3:13
13.	"The Same Way (acoustic version)" (Band version appears on track six of the standard album)	Peter Green	John Mayall & the Bluesbreakers	2:17
14.	"Stop Messin' Around (acoustic version)" (A full-band version appears on Moore's earlier album Still Got the Blues (1990))	Peter Green; Clifford Adams	Fleetwood Mac	3:02
Total length:				8:32

== Personnel ==
- Gary Moore – guitar, vocals
- Tommy Eyre – keyboards
- Nick Payn – baritone saxophone
- Nick Pentelow – tenor saxophone
- Andy Pyle – bass
- Graham Walker – drums

== Charts ==
Chart performance for Blues for Greeny
Chart (1995)	Peak position
Australian Albums (ARIA)	59
Belgian Albums (Ultratop Wallonia)	37
Dutch Albums (Album Top 100)	71
German Albums (Offizielle Top 100)	33
Norwegian Albums (VG-lista)	31
Swedish Albums (Sverigetopplistan)	40
Swiss Albums (Schweizer Hitparade)	26
UK Albums (Official Charts)	14
