= Juicy Lucy =

Juicy Lucy may refer to:

- Juicy Lucy (band), a British blues rock band
- Juicy Lucy (Juicy Lucy album), 1969
- Juicy Lucy (Sal Salvador album), 1978
- Jucy Lucy, a type of cheeseburger popular in Minnesota
