= Rick Brown =

Rick Brown or Ricky Brown may refer to:

- Richard Shaw Brown (born 1947), American singer and songwriter
- Ricky Brown (born 1983), American football player
- Ricardo Brown (basketball) (born 1957), also known as Ricky Brown, Filipino American basketball player
- Rickey Brown (born 1958), American basketball player
- Ricky Brown (basketball) (born 1955), American basketball player
- Rick "Grizzly" Brown (1960–2002), American strength athlete and powerlifter
- Ricky Brown (tennis) (born 1967), American tennis player
- Rick Brown (born 1945), also known as Ricky Fenson, British blues musician
- Ricky Brown (born 1985), better known as NoClue, American rapper

== See also ==
- Richard Brown (disambiguation)
