= Dark Days in Paradise =

Studio album by Gary Moore
- Released: 26 May 1997
- Genre: Experimental pop; rock; Britpop; electronic
- Length: 67:28
- Label: Virgin
- Producer: Gary Moore; Chris Tsangarides; Andy Bradfield

Gary Moore chronology
Blues for Greeny (1995)	Dark Days in Paradise (1997)	A Different Beat (1999)

Singles from Dark Days in Paradise
- 1. "One Good Reason" Released: 1997; 2. "I Have Found My Love in You" Released: 1997

Dark Days in Paradise is the eleventh solo studio album by Irish guitarist Gary Moore, released by Virgin Records on 26 May 1997. It represented a stark change in musical direction for Moore, eschewing the blues and blues rock stylings of his preceding albums in favour of a more contemporary sound. Moore produced the album with Chris Tsangarides and was joined in the recording by musicians such as Guy Pratt, Gary Husband and Magnus Fiennes.

Described by Moore as encompassing all the musical influences he had ever had, Dark Days in Paradise is an experimental pop record that incorporates a diverse array of styles, including drum and bass, jungle, world music, soul, jazz, folk, Eastern music, Irish folk, Britpop, reggae and hip hop, with a rhythmic, song-based focus throughout and an elegant production style with electronic beats. The lo-fi pop song "One Good Reason" and soulful "I Have Found My Love in You" preceded the album as lead single in different regions. Both songs charted in Britain.

On release, the album reached number 43 on the UK Albums Chart and number 41 on the European Top 100 Albums. It was deemed a commercial failure, having alienated Moore's fans with his change of direction. Reviewers of the album noted the contemporary sound and complimented Moore's surprising stylistic detours. The guitarist promoted the album with live gigs in the UK and Europe throughout 1997. Virgin reissued the album in 2003 with bonus tracks.

== Background and recording ==
In 1990, Gary Moore released the blues album Still Got the Blues, marking a stark departure from the heavy metal direction he took in the 1980s. A major critical and commercial success on both sides of the Atlantic, Still Got the Blues inspired Moore to continue pursuing a blues direction on his succeeding albums, After Hours (1992), Blues Alive (1993) and Blues for Greeny (1995). Nonetheless, following these records, Moore conceived Dark Days in Paradise as a drastic change in direction; Record Collector writer Tim Jones wrote this was "true to form" for Moore, as he was "not a man to rest on his laurels". Dark Days in Paradise was produced by Moore with Chris Tsangarides, with additional production from Andy Bradfield, who also mixed the album. Moore, who contributes vocals and guitar, was joined by bassist Guy Pratt, drummer Gary Husband, keyboardists and programmers Magnus Fiennes and Phil Nicholas, and backing vocalists Chyna Gordon and Dee Lewis.

== Composition ==
Eschewing the blues focus of Moore's prior work for a more contemporary feel, Dark Days in Paradise is a diverse and rhythmical album that incorporates many styles, including drum and bass, soul, folk, jazz, Irish folk, Eastern music and ballads. Instead of blues rock, Moore utilises electronic beats alongside his soaring guitar playing. According to critic Andrew Hirst, the album's wide range of styles are "alien to [Moore's] usual blues output", highlighting the jungle track "Always There For You", the Britpop song "One Fine Day" and the soulful "I Have Found My Love in You", but noted that each style is accompanied by Moore's guitar work. Neil McCormick describes it as an "understated song-based collection" encompassing lo-fi pop (as on "One Good Reason"), as well as shades of hip hop, world music and jungle. Colin Larkin comments that the record has "little blues on offer", instead attempting "rock, AOR and pop", while Jones says that the album saw Moore "[take] up the Britpop challenge". The Irish Times called the first of two consecutive experimental pop albums recorded by Moore, followed by A Different Beat (1999).

Moore said that Dark Days in Paradise "encompasses all the influences I've had in my career over the years and a few new ones. There's a bit of everything in there. I've been listening to a lot of hip-hop, drum 'n' bass, reggae, R&B, very rhythmical stuff." He added that the record was not a response to people's perception of him as an artist, bur rather "just what I wanted to do. The same when I started, or went back, to playing blues, I just felt it was time for a change." The production buoys the melodies with elegant string arrangements, with guitar solos generally minimised. Of the more unusual material, "One Fine Day" has been described as a Beatlesque song containing a bassline evocative of the Beatles' "Rain" (1966), while "Like Angels" is a keyboard-heavy ballad reminiscent of late 1980s music, whereas "Always There for You" uses racing jungle rhythms as a backdrop for an otherwise soulful track. Though Moore had abandoned blues on the album, song titles such as "Cold Wind Blows" and "Where Did We Go Wrong" still betray a moodiness reminiscent of Moore's blues work.

== Release and promotion ==
Moore's change in musical direction for Dark Days in Paradise was commented on within the industry press. Paul Sexton of Music & Media commented on the guitarist repeatedly surprising his audiences "by changing his sound so much that at times he's almost unrecognisable. Consequently, Virgin Records is able to tell anyone who expects the veteran guitarist's new album, Dark Days in Paradise, to be just another blues album to think again." Sexton himself called the album "as pronounced a career shift as you're likely to hear this year," while David Willie, Virgin's international marketing director, commented on the enthusiasm and excitement that Moore expressed for the album in interviews, and said of its commercial expectations: "There might have been some fear that hardcore fans would be alienated, but the truth is contrary to that, this album excites them as well."

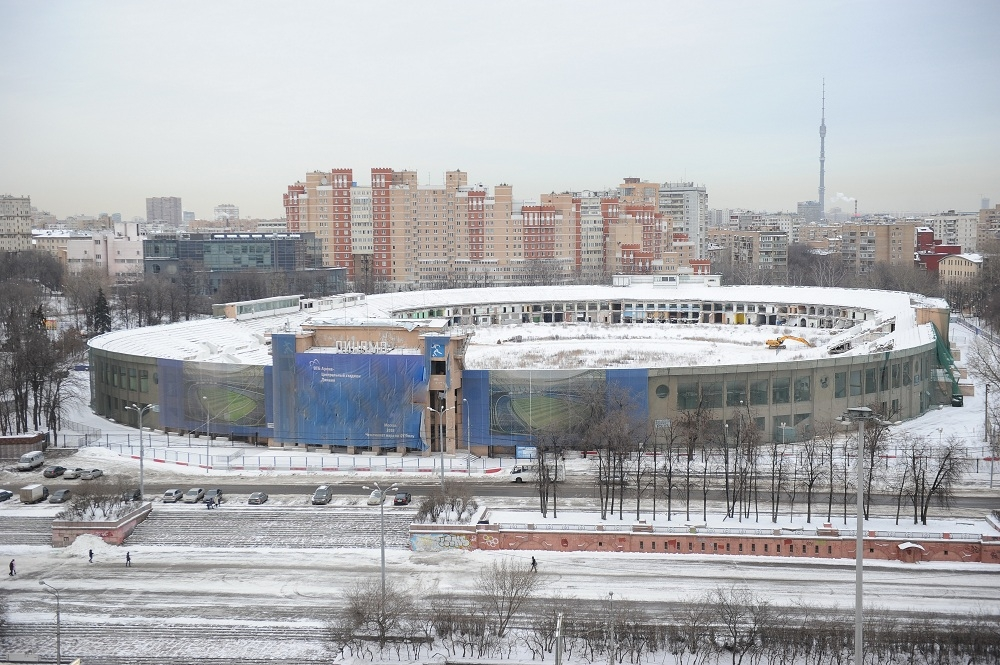
Gary Moore played, as a guest of Sting, at Moscow's Central Dynamo Stadium in June 1997

Issued through Virgin, Dark Days in Paradise was released in the United Kingdom and Europe on 26 May 1997. The album design, courtesy of Sonicon, depicts the long-haired Moore in a velvet jacket and sunglasses, along with a younger female model in her underwear; McCormick describes these as "all the usual accoutrements of a Seventies rock star". In the UK, the record was promoted with press advertisements, and was preceded by the lead single "One Good Reason", whereas elsewhere in Europe, the choice for lead single was the soulful "I Have Found My Love In You". To further promote the album, Moore travelled on 2 June to Spain – traditionally one of his strongest markets – to appear on the popular television series Mississippi, and then began rehearsing in London for a European tour, beginning on 27 June as support act for Sting at Central Dynamo Stadium in Moscow, Russia; further live shows included the Montreux Jazz Festival in Switzerland on 9 July, with several British gigs following later in the year.

According to Jones, Moore's sudden change of direction surprised many of Moore's more recently won fans, and the album sold poorly. On release, Dark Days in Paradise debuted and peaked at number 43 on the UK Albums Chart, spending two weeks on the chart. On the UK Singles Chart, "One Good Reason" reached number 79 in May, while "I Have Found My Love in You" reached number 90 at the end of June. Larkin commented that, just as Moore's followers were becoming used to his blues style, the switch to rock, AOR and pop styles on Dark Days in Paradise alienated his fans again, saying that "the album's tepid response no doubt reflected their rejection of his new approach." Elsewhere, the record debuted at number 41 on the European Top 100 Albums chart, and reached number two in Greece. Virgin reissued the album in 2003, adding three bonus tracks: the title track, "Burning in Our Hearts" and "There Must Be a Way".

== Critical reception ==
Professional ratings
Review scores
Source	Rating
AllMusic	3.5/5 stars
Encyclopedia of Popular Music	2/5 stars

Reviewing Dark Days in Paradise for The Daily Telegraph, McCormick said that despite having questionable artwork, the album itself "presents a strong case for clemency", noting that Moore was "catching up" on recent music. He praised the "immediately appealing" production for its lack of bombast, and said that while Moore's mid-Atlantic singings remained irritating, the album ultimately "has a genuinely contemporary feel. It is a subtle but surprising reinvention, so much less forced than, say, David Bowie's recent reincarnation as an ancient rave king." Steve Wiggins of Barry & District News recommended the album to those seeking a diverse selection of music, highlighting "One Fine Day" and "One Good Reason" as its best songs.

In his review for Huddersfield Daily Examiner, Andrew Hirst also commented on the album's unusual array of styles and sounds, particularly noting the surprising nature of Moore creating a drum and bass track. He described "I Have Found My Love in You" as "achingly gorgeous" and further praised "One Fine Day", and assured concerned fans that Moore "rocks as well" with shrieking guitars throughout the record. He later ranked Dark Days in Paradise ninth in his list of the greatest albums of 1997, calling it one of best Moore's best works in years and counting it alongside other then-recent albums by Bowie, Terry Hall, the Beautiful South, Van Morrison, George Michael, Depeche Mode, Teddy Pendergrass and Chumbawamba as examples of long-established acts proving "they're a class above the never-ending conveyor belt of boy bands".

Andy Tilley of Burton Mail commented on Moore's multiple "incarnations" over the years, since producing impressively fast guitar licks in the early 1970s with Skid Row; he said: "He's been through any number of incarnations since, dumping rapidity for tone along the way, and re-emerges here apparently bidding for an MOR cabaret slot. Slick'n'sickly, no longer so twiddly." In his retrospective review for AllMusic, Greg Prato commented that Moore was "at a career crossroads" by the late 1990s, choosing to "try something a bit contemporary" instead of continuing the blues sound that brought him American success earlier in the decade. He praised the guitarist for venturing beyond what audiences would typically expect from one of his albums and said that while fans of Victims of the Future (1984) may be left "wondering where all the hard rock went," Dark Days in Paradise would otherwise "be an interesting listen for fans curious to hear Moore trying new approaches."

== Track listing ==
All songs written by Gary Moore.

1. "One Good Reason" – 3:02
2. "Cold Wind Blows" – 5:26
3. "I Have Found My Love in You" – 4:53
4. "One Fine Day" – 4:58
5. "Like Angels" – 7:32
6. "What Are We Here For?" – 5:44
7. "Always There For You" – 4:33
8. "Afraid of Tomorrow" – 6:42
9. "Where Did We Go Wrong?" – 6:36
10. "Business as Usual" – 18:02 (includes the hidden track "Dark Days in Paradise" – 3:27)

=== 2003 Virgin re-release ===
1. "One Good Reason" – 3:02
2. "Cold Wind Blows" – 5:26
3. "I Have Found My Love in You" – 4:53
4. "One Fine Day" – 4:58
5. "Like Angels" – 7:32
6. "What Are We Here For?" – 5:44
7. "Always There For You" – 4:33
8. "Afraid of Tomorrow" – 6:42
9. "Where Did We Go Wrong?" – 6:36
10. "Business as Usual" – 13:36
11. "Dark Days in Paradise" – 3:33 (hidden track)
12. "Burning in Our Hearts" – 6:03
13. "There Must Be a Way" – 4:05

The 2003 remaster did away with the one-minute pause and adds an index for the title track, but it's still not mentioned on the packaging or in the lyrics, which means the actual bonus tracks (which originally appeared on the CD single "One Good Reason" VSCDT 1632) are given as track 11 and 12 respectively on the printed tracklist.

== Personnel ==
Adapted from the liner notes of Dark Days in Paradise

- Gary Moore – guitar, vocals, string arrangements ("One Good Reason", "Afraid of Tomorrow", "Business as Usual"), additional production ("What Are We Here For?", "Always There for You", "Afraid of Tomorrow")
- Guy Pratt – bass
- Gary Husband – drums
- Magnus Fiennes – keyboards, programming
- Chyna Gordon – backing vocals
- Dee Lewis – backing vocals
- Phil Nicholas – keyboards, programming
- Nick Ingman – string arrangements ("One Good Reason", "Business as Usual")
- Ed Shurmur – string arrangements ("Afraid of Tomorrow")
- Andy Bradfield – additional production, mixing
- Stuart Weston – photography
- Sonicon – design

== Charts ==
Chart (1997)	Peak position
Australian Albums (ARIA)	161
European Top 100 Albums	41
UK Albums Chart	43
