= Ahead Rings Out =

Studio album by Blodwyn Pig
- Released: 25 July 1969
- Recorded: April 1969
- Studios: Morgan, London
- Genres: Blues rock; progressive blues; progressive pop
- Length: 41:46
- Label: Island
- Producer: Andy Johns

Blodwyn Pig chronology
| Ahead Rings Out (1969) | Getting to This (1970) |

Ahead Rings Out is the debut album by British blues-rock band Blodwyn Pig, released in 1969. The band had been formed in 1969 by Mick Abrahams, the former guitarist of Jethro Tull; further, sales of Ahead Rings Out rivalled those of Jethro Tull's next album, Stand Up, reaching No. 9 on the UK albums chart.

The album contained a mixture of various styles of progressive blues. "The Modern Alchemist" track displayed the jazz influence and saxophone skills of Jack Lancaster.

== Background ==
In liner notes for the 2001 re-issue of the album, songwriter and singer Mick Abrahams recalled:

The producer was Andy Johns (little brother to Glyn Johns of Rolling Stones production fame). I think the tape operator was Robin Black, who later went on to produce Jethro Tull and other notable acts of the time.

I recall that we were all quite chuffed with the end result of this, our first offering after my not too long ago departure from Jethro Tull.

One of the first songs we laid down was "It's Only Love" and it was cool at the time to have the availability of an eight-track machine to record with. Great for overdubs and thickening out the sound...

"Dear Jill" (a favourite of mine to this day) was the next track we laid down and the nice thing about it was that by double-tracking the guitar, which was an Eko 12-string with only 9–10 strings on it (depending on my mood or how many strings I could afford on the day) it sounded akin to a modern chorus effect pedal which, coupled with Jack's haunting soprano sax, made it into a solid stand up song. It was featured in Cameron Crowe’s movie Almost Famous as part of the background music to reflect the theme and time of the film.

About "See My Way", he comments: "It was a solid two days work to get it just how we felt it should be with all the odd changes of tempo and feel, i.e. the section that sounds like Ravel’s Boléro... That song didn't go on the UK version of Ahead Rings Out, but instead the powers that be decided in their wisdom to put it on the USA version and left it until we recorded the second album, Getting to This.”

He described "The Modern Alchemist" as "a great composition of Jack Lancaster's that brought a mixture of hard hybrid jazz-rock flavour to the album".

Blodwyn Pig were unsatisfied with the album, with Lancaster telling a Beat Instrumental interviewer in 1969 that he considered it "awful", adding: "It has a sound which hits you and that's all. You can't get any more out of it".

== Reception ==
Professional ratings
Review scores
| Source | Rating |
|---|---|
| AllMusic | 4.5/5 stars |
| The Encyclopedia of Popular Music | 5/5 stars |
| The Rolling Stone Record Guide | 4/5 stars |

Ahead Rings Out was a critical success. Melody Maker stated, "An excellent debut with lots of exciting music. The album has direction and thought and gives a great deal of hope for the future of the often maligned progressive pop scene". New Musical Express wrote, "Hooting grunting blues mingled with snorts of jazz adds up to an excellent debut album from one of our most promising groups".

It was voted number 15 in the All-Time 50 Long Forgotten Gems from Colin Larkin's All Time Top 1000 Albums. Writing in The Virgin Encyclopedia of Heavy Rock (1999), Larkin wrote that the album "contains a healthy mixture of various styles of progressive blues". In 2019, Classic Rock ranked it at number 21 in their list of the best 30 British blues rock albums ever, praising it as a "wildly diverse debut" that contrasts heavily with Jethro Tull.

Discussing the material, Classic Pop opined that only the jazzy, flute-based "Leave It with Me" compares with Jethro Tull, evoking "Dharma for One" (1968), otherwise highlighting the "freewheeling, rocking abandon" of "It's Only Love" and "Sing Me a Song That I Know", the gentle "Dear Jill", the relaxed blues song "Up and Coming" and the heavy metal track "Ain't Ya Comin’ Home Babe?" Larkin comments that the latter song was influenced by Jethro Tull, grouping it alongside the slide guitar-driven "Dear Jill" as two of the strongest songs, alongside the lengthy "The Modern Alchemist", which showcases Lancaster's jazz influence and saxophone talents.

== Track listing ==
UK release

1. "It's Only Love" (Mick Abrahams) – 3:23
2. "Dear Jill" (Abrahams) – 5:19
3. "Sing Me a Song That I Know" (Abrahams) – 3:08
4. "The Modern Alchemist" (Jack Lancaster) – 5:38
5. "Up and Coming" (Abrahams, Lancaster, Andy Pyle, Ron Berg) – 5:31
6. "Leave It With Me" (Lancaster) – 3:52
7. "The Change Song" (Abrahams) – 3:45
8. "Backwash" (Abrahams, Lancaster, Pyle, Berg) – 0:53
9. "Ain’t Ya Comin' Home, Babe?" (Abrahams, Lancaster, Pyle) – 6:04
- Bonus tracks on 2006 EMI Digital Remaster reissue CD:

10. "Sweet Caroline" (Abrahams) – 2:51
11. "Walk on the Water" (Abrahams) – 3:42
12. "Summer Day" (Abrahams, Pyle) – 3:44
13. "Same Old Story" (Abrahams) – 2:36
14. "Slow Down" (Larry Williams) – 4:20
15. "Meanie Mornay" (Abrahams) – 4:45
16. "Backwash" (Abrahams, Lancaster, Pyle, Berg) – 0:53

NB: CD reissue has track 8 as "See My Way", as per comments above regarding US track listing, hence track 8 from the UK release "Backwash" being included as a bonus track 16.

U.S. release

1. "It's Only Love" (Mick Abrahams) – 3:23
2. "Dear Jill" (Abrahams) – 5:19
3. "Walk on the Water" (Abrahams) – 3:42
4. "The Modern Alchemist" (Jack Lancaster) – 5:38
5. "See My Way" (Abrahams) – 5:00
6. "Summer Day" (Abrahams, Pyle) – 3:44
7. "The Change Song" (Abrahams) – 3:45
8. "Backwash" (Abrahams, Lancaster, Pyle, Berg) – 0:53
9. "Ain’t Ya Comin' Home, Babe?" (Abrahams, Lancaster, Pyle) – 6:04

== Personnel ==
- Mick Abrahams – guitar, vocals, seven-string slide guitar
- Jack Lancaster – flute, violin, tenor sax, baritone sax, soprano sax, brass arrangements
- Andy Pyle – electric bass, six-string bass
- Ron Berg – drums

== Charts ==
| Chart (1969) | Peak position |
|---|---|
| Canada RPM Top 100 Albums | 74 |
| UK Albums Chart | 9 |
| US Billboard Top LPs | 149 |
