= Getting to This =

Album by Blodwyn Pig

Studio album by Blodwyn Pig
- Released: 10 April 1970
- Recorded: 1970
- Studios: Olympic and Trident Studios
- Length: 38:29 [album]
- Label: Chrysalis
- Producer: Andy Johns

Blodwyn Pig chronology
Ahead Rings Out (1969)	Getting to This (1970)	Lies (1993)

Professional ratings
Review scores
Source	Rating
AllMusic	2.5/5 stars

Getting to This was the second album by British blues-rock band Blodwyn Pig, released in 1970. The album was the band's last until a brief reunion in the 1990s. Peter Banks joined from Yes after the recording of Getting to This. However, the band split up at the end of 1970. The album reached number 8 on the UK Albums Chart and No. 96 on the US Billboard Top LPs.

== Track listing ==
1. "Drive Me" – 3:19 (Abrahams)
2. "Variations on Nainos" – 3:47 (Abrahams)
3. "See My Way" – 5:04 (Abrahams)
4. "Long Bomb Blues" – 1:07 (Abrahams)
5. "The Squirreling Must Go On" – 4:22 (Abrahams, Pyle)
6. "San Francisco Sketches" – 8:11 (Lancaster)
  - a) "Beach Scape"
  - b) "Fisherman's Wharf"
  - c) "Telegraph Hill"
  - d) "Close the Door, I'm Falling Out of the Room"
7. "Worry" – 3:43 (Pyle)
8. "Toys" – 3:03 (Abrahams)
9. "To Rassman" – 1:29 (Berg)
10. "Send Your Son to Die" – 4:25 (Abrahams)
11. "Summer Day" (bonus track on CD release) – 3:48 (Abrahams, Pyle)
12. "Walk On the Water" (bonus track on CD release) – 3:42 (Abrahams)

== Personnel ==
- Mick Abrahams – guitar, vocals, seven-string guitar, tenor guitar
- Jack Lancaster – flute, violin, electric violin, tenor sax, baritone sax, soprano sax, phoon horn, cornet
- Andy Pyle – electric bass, six-string bass
- Ron Berg – drums, tympani
- Graham Waller – piano ("Drive Me", "Beach Scape")

== Charts ==
Chart (1970)	Peak position
Canada RPM Top 100 Albums	38
UK Top Albums	8
US Billboard Top LPs	96
