= After the War (Gary Moore album) =

- Cover photo by John Claridge

Studio album by Gary Moore
- Released: 25 January 1989
- Recorded: 1988
- Genres: Hard rock; heavy metal
- Length: 53:01
- Label: Virgin
- Producer: Peter Collins

Gary Moore chronology
Wild Frontier (1987)	After the War (1989)	Still Got the Blues (1990)

Singles from After the War
- 1. "After the War" Released: January 1989; 2. "Ready for Love" Released: March 1989; 3. "Led Clones" Released: April 1989 (US); 4. "Livin' on Dreams" Released: October 1989

Professional ratings
Review scores
Source	Rating
AllMusic	3/5 stars
Collector's Guide to Heavy Metal	6/10
Kerrang!	2/5 stars
Rock Hard	8.0/10

After the War is the seventh solo studio album by the Northern Irish guitarist Gary Moore, released on 25 January 1989 by Virgin Records.

== Background ==
After the War continues in the hard rock/heavy metal vain of previous efforts but like its predecessor, Wild Frontier, the album contains elements of Celtic music. The instrumental "Dunluce" is named after Dunluce Castle in Northern Ireland.

On "Led Clones", Ozzy Osbourne, with whom Moore had worked before the singer united with Randy Rhoads, shares lead vocals. The song pokes fun at bands such as Kingdom Come which were popular at the time, and is based on a Led Zeppelin-type sound and image. "That song was great fun," Ozzy recalled, "and it was an honour to record with Gary." The Sisters of Mercy frontman, Andrew Eldritch, provides backing vocals on the songs "After the War", "Speak for Yourself" and "Blood of Emeralds". Moore again pays tribute to the memory of his long-time friend and colleague Phil Lynott with the song "Blood of Emeralds".

Although Cozy Powell played drums on the album, he was replaced by Chris Slade for the tour, as he was set to tour with Black Sabbath, in support of the album, Headless Cross, on which he also played drums.

After the War was Moore's last foray into conventional hard rock, and his last rock album of any kind until Dark Days in Paradise in 1997. Starting with his next album, Still Got the Blues, he primarily played blues.

== Track listing ==
All tracks are written by Gary Moore, except where indicated.

Side one
No.	Title	Writer(s)	Length
1.	"After the War"		4:17
2.	"Speak for Yourself"	Moore, Neil Carter	3:42
3.	"Livin' on Dreams"		4:14
4.	"Led Clones" (feat. Ozzy Osbourne)	Moore, Carter	6:07

Side two
No.	Title	Writer(s)	Length
1.	"Running from the Storm"		4:45
2.	"This Thing Called Love"		3:32
3.	"Ready for Love"		5:39
4.	"Blood of Emeralds"	Moore, Carter	8:19

CD release
No.	Title	Writer(s)	Length
1.	"Dunluce (Part 1)" (instrumental)		1:17
2.	"After the War"		4:17
3.	"Speak for Yourself"	Moore, Carter	3:42
4.	"Livin' on Dreams"		4:14
5.	"Led Clones" (feat. Ozzy Osbourne)	Moore, Carter	6:07
6.	"The Messiah Will Come Again" (instrumental)	Roy Buchanan	7:29
7.	"Running from the Storm"		4:45
8.	"This Thing Called Love"		3:22
9.	"Ready for Love"		5:39
10.	"Blood of Emeralds"	Moore, Carter	8:19
11.	"Dunluce (Part 2)" (instrumental)		3:50

2002 remastered CD bonus tracks
No.	Title	Writer(s)	Length
12.	"Emerald" (Thin Lizzy cover)	Scott Gorham, Brian Downey, Brian Robertson, Phil Lynott	4:06
13.	"Over the Hills and Far Away" (live)		10:16
14.	"Military Man" (live)	Lynott	6:26
15.	"Wild Frontier" (live)		5:01

== Personnel ==
Musicians

- Gary Moore – guitars, lead vocals
- Neil Carter – keyboards, backing vocals
- Bob Daisley – bass guitar
- Cozy Powell – drums
- Don Airey – keyboards on "The Messiah Will Come Again", "Running from the Storm" and "This Thing Called Love"
- Ozzy Osbourne – co-lead vocals on "Led Clones;" backing vocals on "Speak for Yourself"
- Laurence Cottle – bass guitar on "The Messiah Will Come Again"
- Steve Piggott - sequencer bass on "Ready for Love"
- Charlie Morgan – drums on "After the War"
- Simon Phillips – drums on "Speak for Yourself" and "Blood of Emeralds"
- Brian Downey – drums on "Emerald"
- Eric Singer – drums on Live tracks "Over The Hills and Far Away", "Military Man" and "Wild Frontier" (from Isstadion Stockholm 1987)
- Chris Thompson – backing vocals on "After the War", "Led Clones" and "Ready for Love"; violin on "Led Clones"
- Andrew Eldritch – backing vocals on "After the War", "Speak for Yourself" and "Blood of Emeralds"
- Sam Brown, Miriam Stockley – backing vocals on "Ready for Love"

Production

- Peter Collins – producer
- Duane Baron – mixing
- Ian Taylor – engineer, mixing
- Steve Barnett, Stewart Young, Hard to Handle – management

== Charts ==
=== Album ===
Year	Chart	Position
1989	German Albums Chart	2
1989	Finnish Albums Chart	3
1989	Norwegian Albums Chart	3
1989	Swedish Albums Chart	3
1989	Swiss Albums Top 100	3
1989	New Zealand Albums Chart	14
1989	Japanese Albums Chart	16
1989	Dutch MegaCharts	17
1989	UK Albums Chart	23
1989	Billboard 200 (US)	114

=== Singles ===
Year	Single	Chart	Position
1989	"After the War"	Norwegian Singles Chart	4
1989	"After the War"	Finnish Singles Chart	5
1989	"After the War"	Swedish Singles Chart	12
1989	"After the War"	Irish Singles Chart	14
1989	"After the War"	Swiss Singles Top 100	17
1989	"After the War"	New Zealand Singles Chart	36
1989	"After the War"	UK Singles Chart	37
1989	"Ready for Love"	Mainstream Rock Tracks (US)	13
1989	"Ready for Love"	Finnish Singles Chart	26
1989	"Ready for Love"	UK Singles Chart	56

== Sales and certifications ==
Certifications for After the War
Region	Certification	Certified units/sales
Germany (BVMI)	Gold	250,000^{^}
Sweden (GLF)	Gold	50,000^{^}
United Kingdom (BPI)	Silver	60,000^{^}
^{^} Shipments figures based on certification alone.

== See also ==
- List of anti-war songs
