= Dick Brown =

Dick Brown may refer to:

- Dick Brown (rugby league), rugby league player in Australia
- Dick Brown (baseball) (1935–1970), catcher in American Major League Baseball
- Dick Brown (curler), American curler
- Dick Brown (Canadian football) (1926–2000), Canadian football player
- Dick Brown (footballer) (1911–1985), English footballer
- Dick Brown (politician) (1887–1971), member of the Queensland Legislative Assembly
- Dick Charles Brown (1905–1969), Cook Islands businessman and politician

== See also ==
- Richard Brown (disambiguation)
