= BBM (band) =

Rock band (Baker, Bruce, Moore)

BBM ("Baker Bruce Moore") is the name of the short-lived power trio, formed in 1993 by long-established artists, bassist Jack Bruce, guitarist Gary Moore (both of whom had collaborated previously on Moore's Corridors of Power) and drummer Ginger Baker (who, with Bruce, was part of Cream—considered one of the first power trios). They released just one studio album, titled Around the Next Dream, which was released on the Virgin record label. It reached number 9 in the UK Albums Chart in the summer of 1994, but spent only four weeks in the listings. The track, "Where in the World" was issued as a single, reaching number 57 in the UK Singles Chart in August 1994. Much of the work was written by Moore with contributions by Bruce, Baker and percussionist Kip Hanrahan. The album cover featured a photograph of Baker (portraying an angel) smoking a cigarette.

The band went on a short UK tour to coincide with the album's release and also played a handful of rock festivals on the continent, before disbanding.

== Around the Next Dream ==
=== Track listing ===
Around The Next Dream

Studio album by BBM
- Released: 17 May 1994
- Recorded: Autumn 1993–early 1994
- Genre: Blues rock
- Length: 51:47
- Labels: Capitol, Virgin
- Producers: Ian Taylor, BBM

Gary Moore chronology
Blues Alive (1993)	Around the Next Dream (1994)	Ballads & Blues 1982–1994 (1994)

Professional ratings
Review scores
Source	Rating
AllMusic	3/5 stars
Q	4/5 stars

CD release
No.	Title	Writer(s)	Length
1.	"Waiting in the Wings"	Gary Moore / Jack Bruce	3:42
2.	"City of Gold"	Gary Moore, Jack Bruce, Kip Hanrahan	3:57
3.	"Where in the World"	Gary Moore, Jack Bruce	5:23
4.	"Can’t Fool the Blues"	Gary Moore, Jack Bruce, Kip Hanrahan	5:15
5.	"High Cost of Loving"	Alan Jones, Sherwin Hamlett	5:14
6.	"Glory Days"	Gary Moore / Jack Bruce	4:23
7.	"Why Does Love (Have to Go Wrong?)"	Gary Moore / Jack Bruce / Ginger Baker	8:47
8.	"Naked Flame"	Moore	6:06
9.	"I Wonder Why (Are You So Mean to Me?)"	Albert King	5:00
10.	"Wrong Side of Town"	Moore	4:00

2002 remastered CD bonus tracks
No.	Title	Writer(s)	Length
11.	"Danger Zone"	Moore	6:00
12.	"World Keeps on Turnin'"	Peter Green	7:53
13.	"Sitting on Top of the World" (Live)	Walter Vinson, Lonnie Chatmon	6:22
14.	"I Wonder Why (Are You So Mean to Me?)" (Live)	Ian Taylor & Albert King	5:08

=== Personnel ===
BBM

- Ginger Baker – drums (on all tracks except "Where In The World"), percussion, production
- Jack Bruce – bass, cello, vocals, keyboards (on "Wrong Side Of Town"), production
- Gary Moore – guitar, vocals, production

Additional personnel

- Tommy Eyre – keyboards (on all tracks except "Wrong Side Of Town")
- Morris Murphy – trumpet (on "Glory Days")
- Arran Ahmun – drums (on "Where In The World")

Technical personnel

- Ian Taylor – engineer, production
- David Scheinmann - photography

== Charts ==
Chart (1994)	Peak position
Australian Albums (ARIA Charts)	78
