= Richard Broun =

Richard Broun may refer to:

- Richard Broun (politician), see Members of the Western Australian Legislative Council, 1832–1870
- Sir Richard Broun, 6th Baronet (died 1781), of the Broun baronets
- Sir Richard Broun, 8th Baronet (1801–1858), of the Broun baronets

== See also ==
- Richard Brown (disambiguation)
- Broun (surname)
