= I Can Take You to the Sun =

1966 single by The Misunderstood

Single by The Misunderstood
- B-side: "Who Do You Love?"
- Released: December 1966
- Recorded: 1966
- Studio: Philips (London)
- Genre: Psychedelic
- Label: Fontana (UK)
- Songwriter(s): Rick Brown, Tony Hill
- Producer(s): Dick Leahy

The Misunderstood singles chronology
"You Don't Have to Go" (1966)	"I Can Take You to the Sun" (1966)	"Children of the Sun" (1968)

"I Can Take You To The Sun" is a song that was composed and recorded by The Misunderstood at Philips Studios in London in 1966. The song is considered a psychedelic music classic.

The single was released to critical acclaim but the band was forced to break up shortly thereafter when lead vocalist/harmonica player Rick Brown was drafted into the Vietnam War.

In a release of early BBC Top Gear shows, host John Peel introduced the song with the comment, "This is to my mind the best popular record that's ever been recorded". Peel would later rank the song as his number 3 song for 1966 in his "Peelennium" (Greatest Songs of the 20th Century) list.

Record Collector magazine, in a July 1999 article wrote, "The Misunderstood were a band of immense talent (...) Without apologies, the Misunderstood single stands (...) as one of the most powerful and best psychedelic singles ever released." "I Can Take You to the Sun" is mentioned in Record Collector's book "100 Greatest Psychedelic Records".
