= Lie Back and Enjoy It =

Studio album by Juicy Lucy
- Released: October 1970
- Genre: Blues rock; country rock
- Length: 35:10
- Label: Vertigo (UK original release); Bronze (UK 1980 reissue); Atco (US); Repertoire (Germany 1993 reissue)
- Producer: Gerry Bron and Nigel Thomas

Juicy Lucy chronology
Juicy Lucy (1969)	Lie Back and Enjoy It (1970)	Get a Whiff of This (1971)

Lie Back and Enjoy It is the second album by British-American blues rock group Juicy Lucy, released in 1970.

Although several members of the band had been replaced since the release of their first album, most notably singer Ray Owen and lead guitarist Neil Hubbard, it was generally considered to be a respectable follow up to their eponymous debut album of the previous year. Most of the songs were written by the band, and there were cover versions of Willie Dixon's "Built for Comfort" and the Frank Zappa song "Willie the Pimp". The album cover has a photograph of steel guitarist Glenn Ross Campbell.

The album peaked at number 53 in the UK Albums Chart in November 1970.

== Track listing ==
Side one

1. "Thinking of My Life" (Paul Williams) – 4:27
2. "Built for Comfort" (Willie Dixon) – 6:00
3. "Pretty Woman" (Paul Williams) – 3:12
4. "Whisky in My Jar" (Micky Moody, Keith Ellis, Paul Williams) – 4:00

Side two

1. "Hello L.A., Bye Bye Birmingham" (Mac Davis, Delaney Bramlett) – 4:15
2. "Changed My Mind" (Neil Hubbard, Glenn Ross Campbell) – 3:07
3. "That Woman's Got Something" (Glenn Ross Campbell, Paul Williams, Micky Moody) 2:53
4. (a) "Willie the Pimp" (Frank Zappa) / (b) "Lie Back and Enjoy It" (Paul Williams) – 7:08

== Personnel ==
- Paul Williams – vocals, congas, piano
- Chris Mercer – saxophone, keyboards
- Mick Moody – guitars
- Glenn Ross Campbell – steel guitars, mandolin
- Keith Ellis – bass
- Rod Coombes – drums, percussion
