= The Misunderstood =

American psychedelic rock band

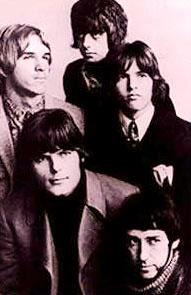
- The Misunderstood in London – 1966

Background information
- Origin: Riverside, California, US
- Genres: Psychedelic rock, blues rock, garage rock, freakbeat
- Years active: 1963–1969, sporadically thereafter
- Labels: Fontana (UK), Cherry Red (UK), Ugly Things (US)
- Past members: Rick Brown; Glenn Ross Campbell; Tony Hill; Rick Moe; Greg Treadway; Steve Whiting; George Phelps; Steve Hoard; David O'List; Chris Mercer; Guy Evans; Nic Potter; Ray Owen
- Website: www.themisunderstood.com

The Misunderstood were an American psychedelic rock band originating from Riverside, California in the mid-1960s. The band moved to Westerham, Kent early in their career, and although they recorded only a handful of songs before being forced to disband, they are considered highly influential in the then-emerging genre.

Creem, in their September 2004 review, wrote, "The saga of the Misunderstood is one of the most unbelievable, heartbreaking, and unlikely stories in the entire history of rock."

Classic Rock's June 2010 issue stated, "The truth is that this band (the Misunderstood) were so far out on their own, so individual and innovative that you can only wonder at the set of circumstances that conspired to prevent them from becoming the iconic name that was surely their destiny."

== History ==
The band began in 1963 as one of many garage bands formed in the US in the wake of the British Invasion. They moved to London in 1966, with the assistance of their manager, John Peel, who would later gain fame as an influential BBC Radio DJ. In the UK, they recruited Englishman Tony Hill on rhythm guitar. Hill and singer Rick Brown formed a songwriting team. Bass player Steve Whiting was also involved in developing material for the band.

The band was influenced by and often compared to the Yardbirds, and in 2004 were called "the American Yardbirds" by Rolling Stone. Distinctive features of the band's sound included the steel guitar of Glenn Ross Campbell and the innovative style of Whiting, known for his use of slide, fuzz tone and distortion.

Fontana Records introduced the band with a four-song live performance in London's Philips Studios. British media response was positive, but at this juncture it was decided that Campbell, Whiting, and Moe should sort out their UK visas and work permits, while Brown returned to California for his draft.

In London they released their second single, "I Can Take You to the Sun", before being forced to disband by Brown's return to the US. They had only recorded six tracks in London.

In spite of their relatively small output, they were considered to be influential pioneers of the acid style of rock music. Head Heritage in a 2006 review wrote, "The Misunderstood's material extended far beyond the reach of the period in which it was conceived. The extraordinarily advanced tracks on side one from 1966 reveal them as one of the earliest and most original probes into psychedelic rock." Writing for Far Out in 2024, Kelly Scanlon claimed the band was "ahead of its time...[and]...Their blend of distorted guitars, heavy feedback, unusual song structures, and socially conscious lyrics reflected the experimental tendencies of the burgeoning psychedelic scene while still maintaining a raw, blues-influenced edge that set them apart from their more mainstream contemporaries".

=== John Peel ===
British DJ John Peel championed the Misunderstood's music throughout his entire career. Shortly before his death, in an interview with Index Magazine, Peel stated, "If I had to list the ten greatest performances I've seen in my life, one would be the Misunderstood at Pandora's Box, Hollywood, 1966. My god, they were a great band!"

=== Visual feedback ===
The Misunderstood are known for having pioneered the live light show. Campbell initially soldered a guitar jack to a car light bulb and plugged this into the extension output behind each amp. This simple idea produced visual music, as the response between the guitars and the lights plugged into the amps was identical. They first showed this feature at the Hi Ho Club in Riverside in early 1966. They also played with lights at the Marquee Club in London in mid 1966. An advanced, multicolored, large scale version of this "light show" or "visual sound" system was being planned in London when the band were forced to retire. Another feature of their visuals was getting all three guitars feeding back using different tremolo settings, thereby leaving the stage flashing with musical lights.

=== Later period ===
Glenn Ross Campbell went on to Juicy Lucy, while Tony Hill formed High Tide and recorded a solo album titled Inexactness.

In 1982, Glenn Ross Campbell and Rick Brown reunited as "Influence", and in 1983 recorded two self-penned tracks, "No Survivors" and "Queen of Madness", for UK's Rough Trade Records. They disbanded in 1985 when Campbell moved to New Zealand and Brown moved to Thailand.

Cherry Red Records (UK) released three albums of the Misunderstood's music, viz., Before the Dream Faded (BRED 32) in 1982, The Legendary Goldstar Album (CDM RED 142) in 1997, and a full album of the Misunderstood's later material under the name of The Misunderstood: Broken Road (CDM RED 147) in 1998.

In 2004, Ugly Things Records (USA) issued another full album of previously unreleased tracks named The Lost Acetates 1965–1966, that received international media coverage.

A novel: Like, Misunderstood by rock historian Mike Stax, based on his own unproduced screenplay, was published in October 2007.

== Musical recognition ==
- In his "Peelenium" (Greatest Songs of the 20th Century) John Peel lists the band's song, "I Can Take You to the Sun" for 1966.
- "I Can Take You to the Sun" appears as number 6 in Record Collector's book, "100 Greatest Psychedelic Records", a list in chronological order.
- Mojo April 2009 – "I Can See For Miles: A-Z" lists the Misunderstood for "M".
- June 11, 2010, Classic Rock named the Misunderstood as No. 18 in their list of "Cult Heroes".

"I'm Not Talkin"
Complete recording of "I'm Not Talkin'".

== Discography ==
=== Albums ===
- Children of the Sun (7-inch vinyl 45 rpm EP), Cherry Red Records CHERRY22, May 1981
- Before the Dream Faded (vinyl album and CD), Cherry Red BRED32, April 1982
  - Produced by Dick Leahy, recorded 1966 in London at Fontana Studios and IBC
- The Legendary Gold Star Album (vinyl album and CD), Cherry Red CDMRED142, 1997
  - Produced by John Peel, recorded early 1966 in Hollywood, California at Gold Star Studios
- The Lost Acetates 1965–66 (vinyl album and CD), Ugly Things Records [USA] UTCD-2201, 2004
  - William Locy Sound, Riverside, California, July 1965–January 1966
  - Gold Star Studios, Hollywood, California, April 1966
  - Demos, IBC Studios, London, September 9, 1966
- Broken Road (CD) Cherry Red CDMRED147, 1998
  - Produced by Kevin Reach, recorded 1981–1983 in Hollywood; contains lyrics by Austin Gordon and Kevin Reach.

=== Compilations ===
- Nuggets II (Original Artyfacts From the British Empire and Beyond 1964-1969)
- Acid Drops, Spacedust & Flying Saucers: Psychedelic Confectionery
- Pillows & Prayers, Vol. 1
- Pillows & Prayers, Vol. 2
- Acid: Final Frontier
- In Search of Space: 60's to 70's, Vol. 3
- And the Heavens Cried
- Rare Trax, Vol. 32: Eight Miles High...US Psychedelic Underground from the 60's and 70's
- Ghetto South – vocals (sample)

=== Singles ===
- "You Don't Have to Go" (Jimmy Reed) / "Who's Been Talkin'" (Chester Burnett), Blue Sound Co. M-13, April 1966
- "I Can Take You to the Sun" (Hill/Brown) / "Who Do You Love?" (Ellas McDaniel), Fontana TF-777, December 1966
- "Children of the Sun" (Hill/Brown) / "I Unseen" (Nâzım Hikmet), Fontana TF-998, February 1969
- "You're Tuff Enough" (Daniels, Moore) / "Little Red Rooster" (Willie Dixon), Fontana TF-1028, May 1969
- "Never Had a Girl (Like You Before)" (Campbell/Hoard) / "Golden Glass" (Campbell/Hoard), Fontana TF-1041, July 1969
