= Juicy Lucy (Juicy Lucy album) =

- Cover art of the Netherlands edition by Fontana label

Studio album by Juicy Lucy
- Released: October 1, 1969
- Recorded: September 1969
- Studio: IBC, London
- Genre: Blues rock
- Length: 41:40
- Label: Vertigo (UK); Fontana (Netherlands, Australia); Atco (US); Bronze (Germany reissue)
- Producer: Gerry Bron, Nigel Thomas

Juicy Lucy chronology
Juicy Lucy (1969)	Lie Back and Enjoy It (1970)

Professional ratings
Review scores
Source	Rating
Allmusic	4/5 stars
Classic Rock	6/10 stars

Juicy Lucy is the debut album by Anglo-American rock band Juicy Lucy, released in 1969. The music is a heavy form of blues-rock, often played at breakneck speed. The album was a moderate success, reaching number 41 on the U.K. album chart but produced a hit single with their version of the Bo Diddley song "Who Do You Love?".

== Track listing ==
Side one

1. "Mississippi Woman" (Juicy Lucy, Ray Owen)
2. "Who Do You Love?" (Bo Diddley)
3. "She's Mine, She's Yours" (Ellis, Thomas)
4. "Just One Time" (Hubbard, Campbell)

Side two

1. "Chicago North-Western" (Hubbard, Campbell)
2. "Train" (Buddy Miles, Rich)
3. "Nadine" (Chuck Berry)
4. "Are You Satisfied?" (Dobson, Mercer, Thomas)
5. "Walking Down The Highway?" (Mercer, Campbell, Owen)

== Charts ==
Chart (1969/70)	Peak position
UK (Official Charts Company)	41
Australia (Kent Music Report)	21

== Personnel ==
- Ray Owen – lead vocals [tracks 2, 5, 6]
- Chris Mercer – tenor saxophone, organ, piano
- Neil Hubbard – lead electric and acoustic guitars
- Glenn Ross Campbell – lead vocals [tracks 1, 3, 4, 6–9], steel guitar, backing vocals, mandolin, marimba
- Keith Ellis – bass, backing vocals
- Pete Dobson – drums, percussion
