= Juicy Lucy (band) =

British blues rock band (1969–2018)

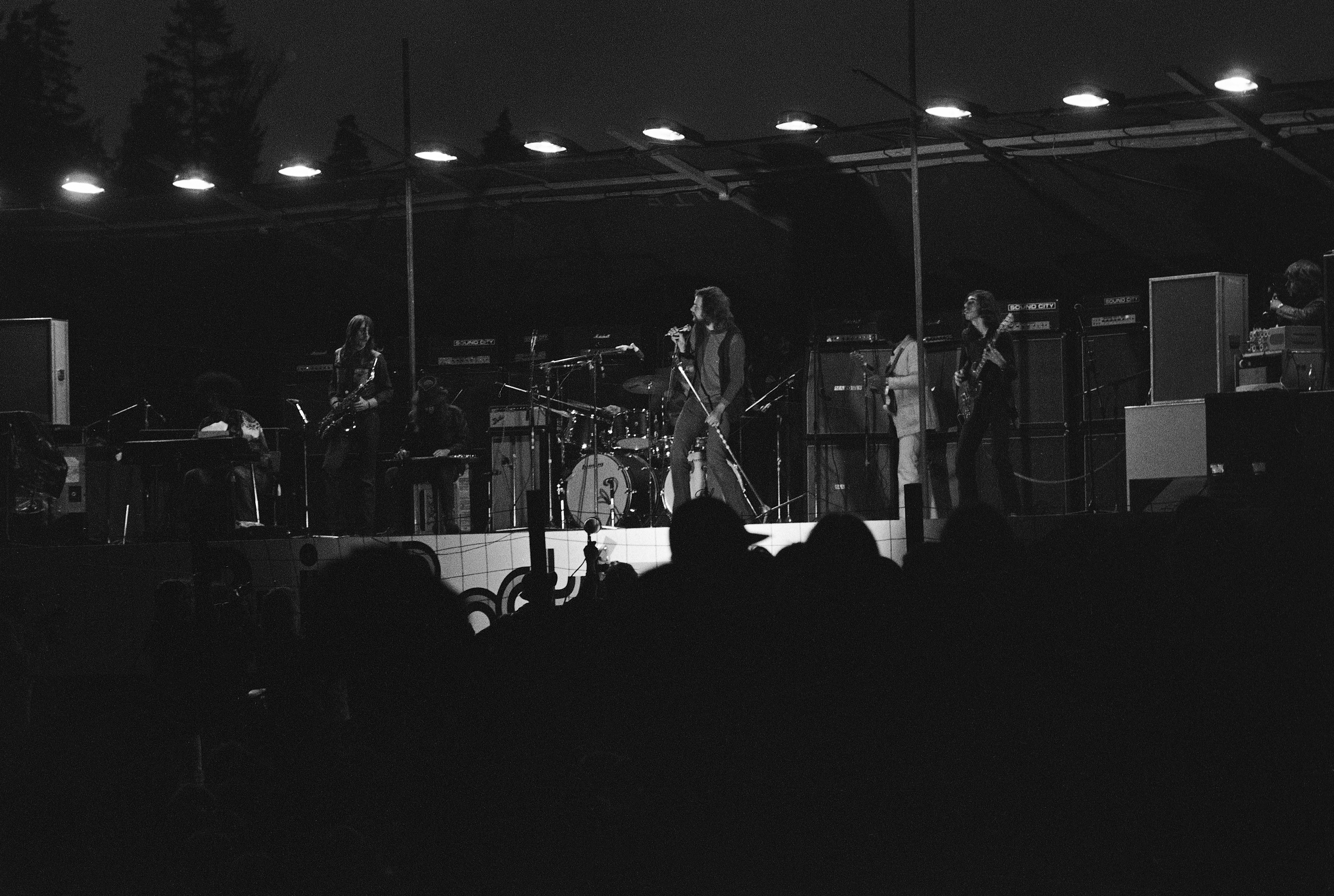
- Juicy Lucy band in Ruisrock in 1971

Background information
- Origin: London, England
- Genres: Blues rock; hard rock; folk rock
- Years active: 1969–1972; 1994–1997; 2004–2018
- Labels: Vertigo, Bronze, Polydor
- Past members: Glenn Ross Campbell; Chris Mercer; Neil Hubbard; Keith Ellis; Ray Owen; Pete Dobson; Paul Williams; Micky Moody; Rod Coombes; Jim Leverton; Tony Murray; Jean Roussel; Andy Pyle; Ron Berg; Mike Jarvis; Andy Doughty; Spencer Blackledge; Steve 'Mr Fish' Fishwick; Sylvain Galesso; Rosie Woodland; Paul Fletcher; Colin Fudge; James Morris; Frank Cokayne; Len Surtees; Mike Phillips

Juicy Lucy was a British blues rock band officially formed on 1 October 1969. After the demise of The Misunderstood, Juicy Lucy was formed by US-born steel guitarist Glenn Ross Campbell, and prolific Blackburn saxophonist Chris Mercer (born 1947). The group later recruited vocalist Ray Owen, guitarist Neil Hubbard, bassist Keith Ellis, and drummer Pete Dobson (born 1950).

The band name was inspired by a character in The Virgin Soldiers (1966) by Leslie Thomas.

== Career ==
The band immediately notched a UK Top 20 hit with their cover version of the Bo Diddley composition "Who Do You Love?" Their eponymous debut album then fell just shy of the Top 40 in the UK Albums Chart. The album's cover featured a burlesque dancer named Zelda Plum, naked except for a covering of fruit. (Some versions have less fruit than others.)

Line-up changes ensued, as former Zoot Money singer Paul Williams (born Paul William Yarlett, 1940), guitarist Micky Moody, and drummer Rod Coombes replaced Ray Owen (who joined Killing Floor, before embarking on a solo career), Neil Hubbard and Pete Dobson, prior to the recording of 1970's Lie Back and Enjoy It (No. 53 – UK Albums Chart). In May 1970, the band appeared at the annual NME poll-winners concert. Another bassist, Jim Leverton, assumed Ellis' duties for the follow-up, 1971's Get a Whiff a This. In August 1971, Juicy Lucy appeared on the bill at the Weeley Festival near Clacton-on-Sea, Essex.

The constant turnover took its toll on the group both creatively and commercially, with co-founders Campbell and Mercer, plus Coombes exiting prior to the fourth Juicy Lucy album, 1972's Pieces. This was recorded by a makeshift line-up of Williams, Moody, keyboardist Jean Roussel, and the former Blodwyn Pig rhythm section of bassist Andy Pyle and drummer Ron Berg. Juicy Lucy disbanded shortly thereafter.

Micky Moody was a member of Snafu between 1973 and 1976, and he later joined the inaugural Whitesnake line-up in 1978. A 1996 album called Blue Thunder was released under the Juicy Lucy name by Paul Williams and Micky Moody, featuring guest musicians Mick Taylor and Andy Summers. Moody and Williams also released an album called Smokestacks, Broomdusters and Hoochie Coochie Men in 2002.

Juicy Lucy's version of the song "Who Do You Love?" was subsequently featured in the video game Shellshock: Nam '67.

In 1995, Ray Owen resurrected the band's name and recorded the album Here She Comes Again. The line-up for this recording also included Mike Jarvis (guitar), Andy Doughty (bass), and Spencer Blackledge (drums). This version of the band broke up in 1997, but Owen persevered and joined up with guitarist Steve 'Mr Fish' Fishwick. Although legal problems would not allow them usage of the name Juicy Lucy, the outfit performed as Ray Owen's Moon (Moon being the title of Ray Owen's 1971 solo album).

In 2004, bassist Colin Fudge and drummer Paul Fletcher joined the band, after the legal situation had been resolved. This version of Juicy Lucy released the album Do That and You'll Lose It in 2006 and toured the UK with Nazareth. They played at the Cambridge Rock Festival in 2008.

In 2009, a new line-up of Juicy Lucy was formed as – due to health problems – Owen was unable to continue touring on a regular basis. The band was then fronted by singer/guitarist Steve 'Mr Fish' Fishwick, with Paul Fletcher on drums and James Morris on bass, and this line-up continued to tour throughout the UK. In September 2012, Frank Cokayne (on bass guitar) joined Fishwick and Fletcher in the UK-based version of the band, with first Len Surtees (ex-The Nashville Teens and Katmandu) then Mike Phillips replacing him in 2013. The songs "Mississippi Woman" and "Who Do You Love?" (from the band's first album) were regularly performed live by this trio, until they parted ways in 2018.

Ray Owen (14 July 1947 – 31 October 2018) occasionally played live in France under the moniker "Ray Owen's Juicy Lucy", accompanied by Mike Jarvis and Spencer Blackledge from the 1990s incarnation of the band, and latterly with Sylvain Galesso on drums and Rosie Woodland on bass guitar. He also performed solo acoustic sets around the UK, including regular engagements at the Lewes Con Club, before his death from cancer in 2018, aged 71.

== Members ==
Final lineup

- Steve "Mr. Fish" Fishwick – vocals, guitar (2004–2018)
- Mike Phillips – bass (2013–2018)
- Paul "Fletch" Fletcher – drums (2004–2018)

== Discography ==
=== Studio albums ===
Year	Album	Label	UK
1969	Juicy Lucy	Vertigo	41
1970	Lie Back and Enjoy It	Vertigo	53
1971	Get a Whiff a This	Bronze	—
1972	Pieces	Polydor	—
1995	Here She Comes Again	HTD Records	—
1996	Blue Thunder	Outer Music	—
2005	Raiding the Fruit Bowl (EP)		—
2006	Do That and You'll Lose It		—
"—" denotes releases that did not chart.

=== Compilation albums ===
- 1974 – The Best of Juicy Lucy (Island Records)
- 1991 – Who Do You Love – The Best of Juicy Lucy (Anthology)
- 1998 – Pretty Woman
- 2010 – Rock Hits Collection

=== Singles ===
Year	Song	UK
1970	"Who Do You Love"	14
1970	"Pretty Woman"	44
1972	"It Ain't Easy"	—
1972	"Midnight Sun"	—
"—" denotes releases that did not chart.

== See also ==
- List of blues rock musicians
- List of Peel sessions
- List of performers on Top of the Pops
