= Glenn Ross Campbell =

- Campbell in London, 1966

Background information
- Also known as: Fernando
- Born: April 28, 1946 (age 79)
- Origin: San Diego, United States
- Genres: Acid rock, progressive rock, blues rock, psychedelic rock, art rock, hard rock
- Instrument: Steel Guitar
- Years active: 1956–present
- Labels: Fontana, Cherry Red, Ugly Things Records
- Website: themisunderstood.com

Glenn Ross Campbell (born April 28, 1946) is an American steel guitarist, most noted for being lead guitarist of cult band The Misunderstood.

== The Misunderstood ==
The Misunderstood were a psychedelic rock band that originated in Riverside, California, in the mid-1960s. The band moved to London early in their career, and although they recorded only a handful of songs before being forced to disband, they are considered highly influential in the then-emerging genre. Influenced by the Yardbirds, the distinctive feature of their sound was Campbell's steel guitar. Rolling Stone in a September 2, 2004, review described the Misunderstood's Campbell as "Jeff Beck and Jimmy Page rolled into one.".

== Post Misunderstood ==
After the untimely break-up of the Misunderstood in London in 1967, Campbell reformed the band with Guy Evans on drums, Nic Potter on bass and former Bush front man, Steve Hoard, on lead vocals. At this point they were no longer playing psychedelic rock, opting for Pop and blues rock. They recorded two singles for Fontana Records before Hoard left and the group split.

With Campbell the only original member of the Misunderstood, British backing musicians were recruited and the name was changed to Juicy Lucy, who made the charts in the UK in 1970 with a rendition of the Bo Diddley song "Who Do You Love?", and released two successful albums.

After the break-up of Juicy Lucy, Campbell was hired to play back up for Joe Cocker, with whom he toured the US. He also played with Sammy Hagar, and with Steve Hoard, and also with Rod Piazza's Dirty Blues Band.

In 1982, Campbell reformed with original Misunderstood singer Rick Brown as The Influence and they recorded a single ("No Survivors/Queen of Madness") for Rough Trade Records (UK).

In 1998, Cherry Red Records (UK) released a full album of their later material under the name of The Misunderstood: Broken Road (CDM RED 147).

In 2004 Ugly Things Records (USA) released another full album of previously unreleased tracks, named Misunderstood: The Lost Acetates 1965-1966, which received international media coverage.

Campbell currently lives in New Zealand, where he has his own band and does session work.

== See also ==
- John Peel
