= Richard Hart Brown =

- Born: June 15, 1941
- Died: June 23, 2005 (aged 64)

Richard Hart Brown (June 15, 1941 – June 23, 2005) was a founder of Interoperative Neurophysiological Monitoring and a leading expert on amusement ride and roller coaster safety.

He was a founder of the American Society of Neurophysiologic Monitoring and a charter member of the American Board of Neurophysiologic Monitoring. He was also a member of many ANSI boards relating to materials and amusement ride safety.
