= Richard Browne (physician) =

English physician

- Occupation: Physician

Richard Browne (fl. 1674–1694), also called Richard Brown, was an English physician.

== Biography ==
Browne was educated at Queen's College, Oxford, but graduated at Leyden, where he was admitted 20 September 1675, being then fifty years old. He became a licentiate of the College of Physicians on 30 September 1678. His principal writings, some of which bear on the title-page by Richard Browne, Apothecary of Oakham,' are:

- ‘Medicina Musica; or a Mechanical Essay on the Effects of Singing, Music, and Dancing on Human Bodies: with an Essay on the Nature and Cure of the Spleen and Vapours,’ London, 1671, new edition 1729.
- ‘Περὶ Ἀρχῶν, Liber in quo Principia Veterurn evertuntur, et nova stabiliuntur,’ London, 1678.
- ‘Prosodia Pharmacopœorum, or the Apothecary's Prosody,' London, 1685.
- ‘English Grammar,‘ London, 1692.
- ‘General History of Earthquakes,' London, 1694, A small book entitled ‘Coral and Steel, a most Compendious Method of Preserving and Restoring Health, by R. B., M.D.,' no date, is doubtfully assigned to the same R. Brown.
