= Mick Abrahams =

British musician (1943–2025)

- Mick Abrahams as part of Blodwyn Pig in 1969

Background information
- Born: Michael Timothy Abrahams; 7 April 1943; Luton, Bedfordshire, England
- Died: 19 December 2025 (aged 82)
- Genres: Rock; blues rock
- Occupations: Musician; singer
- Instruments: Guitar; vocals
- Years active: 1960s–2025
- Labels: Island; A&M; Chrysalis
- Formerly of: Jethro Tull; Blodwyn Pig

Michael Timothy Abrahams (7 April 1943 – 19 December 2025) was an English musician, best known for being the original guitarist for Jethro Tull from 1967 to 1968 and the leader of Blodwyn Pig.

== Early life and career ==
Michael Timothy Abrahams was born on 7 April 1943 in Luton, Bedfordshire. He played on the album This Was recorded by Jethro Tull in 1968, but conflicts between Abrahams and Ian Anderson over the musical direction of the band led Abrahams to leave shortly after the album was finished, but not before contributing guitar to one further non-LP single. Abrahams wanted to pursue a more blues/rock direction, while Anderson wanted to incorporate more overt folk and jazz influences.

== Blodwyn Pig and later career ==
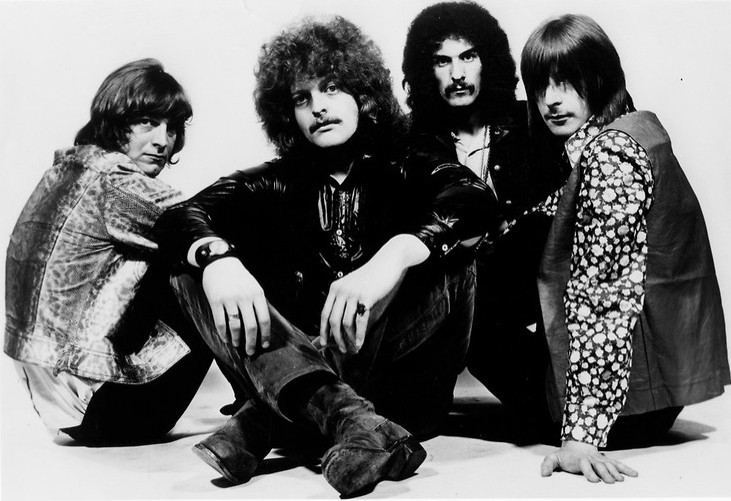
Mick Abrahams (second from left) as part of Blodwyn Pig in 1969

Abrahams went on to found Blodwyn Pig, and the group recorded two albums, Ahead Rings Out (1969) and Getting to This (1970), before breaking up in 1970. Abrahams soldiered on with the short-lived Wommett, then the Mick Abrahams Band, and he continued to release albums by himself and with reunited versions of Blodwyn Pig. He worked as a driver, lifeguard, and financial consultant, occasionally playing gigs, especially to support causes in Dunstable, Bedfordshire.

Abrahams suffered a heart attack in November 2009 and took time to recuperate before resuming work. In April 2010, his website revealed that he had Ménière's disease, which would hold him back from performing at least for another year. In December 2013, he posted an update referring to his continuing health problems and mentioning that he hoped to release an album in 2014.

In 2015, Abrahams announced a new studio album called Revived!, with several guests–among them Martin Barre, his replacement in Jethro Tull.

=== Death ===
Abrahams died on 17 December 2025 at the age of 82.

== Discography ==
=== Jethro Tull ===
- 1968 This Was

=== Blodwyn Pig ===
- 1969 Ahead Rings Out
- 1970 Getting to This
- 1997 Live at Lafayette (Bootleg)
- 1999 Live at the Fillmore West: 3 August 1970 (Bootleg)
- 1999 On Air: Rare Singles & Radio Sessions 1969–1989 (Bootleg)
- 2000 The Basement Tapes
- 2002 Live at the Marquee Club London 1974 (Official Bootleg)
- 2003 Rough Gems (Official Bootleg No.2)
- 2012 Radio Sessions '69 to '71

=== Mick Abrahams Band ===
- 1971 Mick Abrahams (recorded with the Mick Abrahams Band, but credited to Mick Abrahams. Early copies include "Band" on the label. It is referred to as "A Musical Evening with the Mick Abrahams Band" on a poster on the left side of the cover picture.) (Chrysalis Records)]
- 1972 At Last (Chrysalis Records)
- 1997 Live in Madrid
- 2008 Amongst Vikings

=== Solo ===
- 1971 Mick Abrahams (see above — recorded with the Mick Abrahams Band, but credited just to Mick Abrahams) (Chrysalis Records)
- 1975 Have Fun Learning The Guitar with Mick Abrahams
- 1991 All Said And Done
- 1996 Mick's Back
- 1996 One
- 2000 Novox (Instrumental)
- 2000 The Very Best of ABY (Compilation)
- 2001 Music to the Play 'A Midsummer Night's Dream'
- 2001 This Was the First Album of Jethro Tull
- 2002 The Best of ABY Vol.2
- 2002 How Many Times (With Sharon Watson)
- 2003 Can't Stop Now
- 2005 Back with the Blues Again
- 2005 Leaving Home Blues
- 2008 65... The Music
- 2013 Hoochie Coochie Man – Lost studio album – Secret Records
- 2015 Revived!

=== Reformed Blodwyn Pig ===
- 1993 Lies
- 1995 All Tore Down – Live
- 1996 Pig in the Middle
- 2000 See My Way
- 2004 All Said and Done
- 2005 Pigthology
- 2011 Times Have Changed (Reissue of Lies)
- 2013 Cat Squirrel Blues

=== This Was Band ===
- 2001 This Is (Live)

=== Collaborations ===
- 1971 : El Pea – Various Artists, Mick plays on "Greyhound Bus", the last song on the album.
- 1996 : To Cry You a Song: A Collection of Tull Tales – Various Artists, Mick plays on "Nothing Is Easy", "Cat's Squirrel", "To Cry You a Song", "A New Day Yesterday", "Teacher", and "Living in the Past".
- 2007 : Beggar's Farm – Itullians, Italian Jethro Tull Tribute band. With Bernardo Lanzetti ex-PFM and ex-Aqua Fragile, ex-Jethro Tull members Jonathan Noyce on bass and Clive Bunker on drums.
