= Richard L. Brown =

American politician (1925–1991)

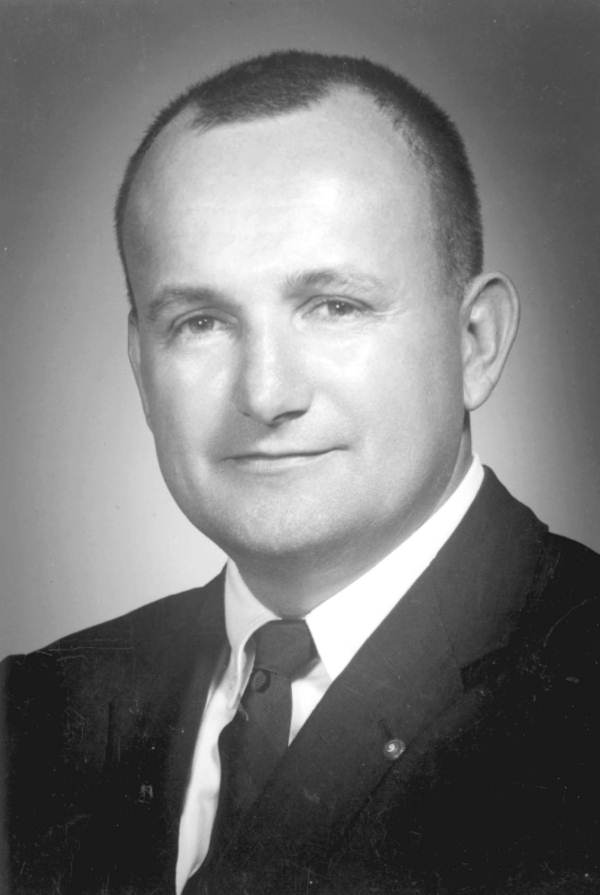
- Brown in 1965

Member of the Florida House of Representatives from Broward County
- In office 1965–1966

Personal details
- Born: May 25, 1925 York, Pennsylvania, U.S.
- Died: January 15, 1991 (aged 65) Fort Lauderdale, Florida, U.S.
- Party: Democratic
- Children: 3
- Education: University of Miami

Richard L. Brown (May 25, 1925 – January 15, 1991) was an American politician who served as a Democratic member of the Florida House of Representatives.

== Life and career ==
Brown attended the University of Miami and served in the United States Navy during World War II.

In 1965, Brown was elected to the Florida House of Representatives, serving until 1966.

Brown died in Fort Lauderdale, Florida, on January 15, 1991, at the age of 65.
