= Richard Brown (cricketer) =

English cricketer

Richard Lewis Brown (born 14 August 1811) was an English cricketer who was associated with Cambridge University and made his debut in 1830.

He was born at Marylebone in London and educated at Eton College and King's College, Cambridge. His date of death is unknown, but Alumni Cantabrigienses records that he was chaplain to the Marquess of Downshire from 1848 to 1883 and that he disappears from Crockford's Clerical Directory in 1884.

== Bibliography ==
- Haygarth, Arthur (1996) [1862]. Scores & Biographies, Volume 1 (1744–1826). Kennington: Frederick Lillywhite. ISBN 978-19-00592-23-9.
- Haygarth, Arthur (1997) [1862]. Scores & Biographies, Volume 2 (1827–1840). Kennington: Frederick Lillywhite. ISBN 978-19-00592-23-9.
