= Ugly Things =

Music magazine

- Ugly Things No. 26 (2008)
- Editor: Mike Stax
- Categories: Music magazine
- Frequency: Yearly
- First issue: 1983
- Country: United States
- Based in: La Mesa, California
- Language: English
- Website: ugly-things.com

Ugly Things (UT) is a music magazine established in 1983, based in La Mesa, California. The editor is Mike Stax (born 1962 in England). The magazine covers mainly 1960s Beat, garage rock, and psychedelic music ("Wild Sounds from Past Dimensions"). The name Ugly Things is a pun that refers to the band Pretty Things.

== History ==
Contributing writers include such names as Mick Farren, Alan Clayson, Richie Unterberger, Doug Sheppard, David Biasotti, Bill Wasserzieher, Michael Lynch, Miriam Linna, Phil X Milstein, Bill Shute, Gray Newell, Don Craine, Mark St John, Pete Innes, Lenny Helsing and Michael Lucas. San Diego CityBeat reviewed Ugly Things in an article entitled "Mike Stax of Ugly Things: A local scenester's internationally known music magazine".

The Lama Workshop editor Patrick Lundborg has stated about UT and editor Mike Stax: "1980s (music) zines have retired into the great recycling container in the sky (it's down to UT, Shindig!, and Misty Lane now), Mike Stax has managed not only to keep it alive, but expand his trip in various directions, and in the process become one of the very best – perhaps THE very best – 1960s-oriented writer out there."

A review of Ugly Things in Head Press by David Kerekes sums up the publication: "When it comes to garage rock and everything associated with 'wild sounds from past dimensions', there is little to compare to the magnitude that is the mighty Ugly Things."

In "My Rock and Roll Magazine Rack", Mark Boudreau (of rockandrollreport.com) writes: "Absolutely encyclopedic in its knowledge of arcane rock and roll, Ugly Things is a rock and roll fan's delight."

The Mod-Sixties Webring says of Ugly Things, "For fans of '60s beat, punk, R&B, garage, psych and freakbeat Ugly Things magazine has been the place to go for over 15 years".

Like, Misunderstood

== UT Records ==
In 2002, Mike Stax started his own record label and released an album by The Misunderstood on UT Records that received international media coverage.

== UT Publishing ==
Stax was working as co-writer (with Rick Brown) on a feature film about The Misunderstood. A novel based on the script, and entitled Like, Misunderstood, was published in October 2007.

== Music ==
Mike Stax is also lead singer of his own band, The Loons.
