= Blues Alive =

Live album by Gary Moore
- Released: 10 May 1993
- Recorded: 20 May – 5 October 1992
- Genres: Blues rock, blues
- Length: 76:11
- Label: Virgin
- Producer: Gary Moore

Gary Moore chronology
After Hours (1992)	Blues Alive (1993)	Around the Next Dream (1994)

Singles from Blues Alive
- 1. "Parisienne Walkways" Released: 26 April 1993

Professional ratings
Review scores
Source	Rating
AllMusic	3/5 stars
The Penguin Guide to Blues Recordings	2.5/4 stars

Blues Alive is a live album by Northern Irish guitarist Gary Moore, released in May 1993. It is a collection of recordings taken from his 1992 tour and draws most of its material from Moore's then-recent Still Got the Blues and After Hours albums. It was by far the most successful of all his live albums, reaching number 8 on the UK Albums Chart and being certified Gold. Its release was preceded by the single "Parisienne Walkways" (live).

== Track listing ==
1. "Cold Day in Hell" (Gary Moore) – 5:35
2. "Walking By Myself" (Kirke, Lane, Jimmy Rogers) – 5:00
3. "Story of the Blues" (Moore) – 7:32
4. "Oh, Pretty Woman" (A.C. Williams) – 4:25
5. "Separate Ways" (Moore) – 5:48
6. "Too Tired" (Maxwell Davis, Johnny "Guitar" Watson, Saul Bihari) – 4:34
7. "Still Got the Blues" (Moore) – 6:44
8. "Since I Met You Baby" (Moore) – 3:02
9. "The Sky Is Crying" (Elmore James, Clarence Lewis, Morgan Robinson) – 8:50
10. "Further on Up the Road" (Joe Medwick, Don Robey) – 5:34
11. "King of the Blues" (Moore) – 6:13
12. "Parisienne Walkways" (Phil Lynott, Moore) – 7:03
13. "Jumpin' at Shadows" (Duster Bennett) – 5:51

== Personnel ==
- Gary Moore – guitar / vocals
- Tommy Eyre – keyboards
- Andy Pyle – bass guitar
- Graham Walker – drums
- Martin Drover – trumpet
- Frank Mead – alto saxophone / harmonica
- Nick Pentalow – tenor saxophone
- Nick Payn – baritone saxophone
- Candy Mackenzie – backing vocals
- Carol Thompson – backing vocals

Guest musician Albert Collins appears on "Too Tired" on guitar and vocals.

== Charts ==
Chart performance for Blues Alive
Chart (1993)	Peak position
Australian Albums (ARIA)	73
Austrian Albums (Ö3 Austria)	14
German Albums (Offizielle Top 100)	31
Norwegian Albums (VG-lista)	18
Swedish Albums (Sverigetopplistan)	40
Swiss Albums (Schweizer Hitparade)	14
UK Albums (Official Charts)	8
