= Still Got the Blues (For You) =

1990 single by Gary Moore

Single by Gary Moore

from the album Still Got the Blues
- Released: 30 April 1990
- Length: 6:12 (album version); 4:10 (edit)
- Label: Virgin
- Songwriter: Gary Moore
- Producers: Ian Taylor; Gary Moore

Gary Moore singles chronology
"Oh Pretty Woman" (1989)	"Still Got the Blues (For You)" (1990)	"Walking by Myself" (1990)

"Still Got the Blues (For You)" is a song by Northern Irish guitarist Gary Moore. It was originally released as the title track of the album Still Got the Blues. The song was released as a single and reached number 31 on the UK Singles Chart in May 1990. It is the only single of Moore's solo career on the US Billboard Hot 100, debuting at number 97 the week of 16 February 1991 and peaking at that position for the first two of three weeks it was on the chart. Moore played his Les Paul Standard guitar throughout the song. He also filmed a basic music video for the song.

The song was covered by Eric Clapton on his 2013 album Old Sock as a tribute to Moore following his death in 2011.

== Plagiarism case ==
On 3 December 2008 a Munich, Germany court ruled that the guitar solo on the song plagiarized a 1974 instrumental recording called "Nordrach" (named after Nordrach, a small river in the central Black Forest) by the German progressive rock band Jud's Gallery from Offenburg. Moore denied knowing of the song, due to its unavailability on record or CD at the time of studio work on his album; the court stated that the song could have been heard on the radio or in a live performance during that time. The court also stated that there was no evidence that the guitar solo was lifted deliberately from "Nordrach", but copyright infringement does not depend on outright theft. Moore was ordered to pay Jürgen Winter, leader of Jud's Gallery, an undisclosed amount in damages.

== Track listing ==
1. "Still Got the Blues (For You)" – 4:12
2. "Left Me with the Blues" – 3:04

== Personnel ==
- Gary Moore – lead vocals, lead and rhythm guitars
- Don Airey – keyboards
- Gavyn Wright – strings
- Andy Pyle – bass guitar
- Graham Walker – drums

== Charts ==
=== Weekly charts ===
Chart (1990–1991)	Peak position
Australia (ARIA)	18
Belgium (Ultratop 50 Flanders)	1
Europe (Eurochart Hot 100)	31
Finland (Suomen virallinen lista)	17
Finland (Radiosoitto listalla)	7
Ireland (IRMA)	28
Netherlands (Dutch Top 40)	2
Netherlands (Single Top 100)	2
Norway (VG-lista)	3
Sweden (Sverigetopplistan)	4
UK Singles (Official Charts)	31
US Billboard Hot 100	97
US Adult Contemporary (Billboard)	43
US Mainstream Rock Airplay (Billboard)	9
West Germany (GfK)	25

Chart (2011)	Peak position
Belgium (Ultratop Back Catalogue Flanders)	1
Netherlands (Single Top 100)	45
Netherlands (Download Top 50)	43
Switzerland (Schweizer Hitparade)	50

=== Year-end charts ===
Chart (1990)	Position
Belgium (Ultratop)	18
Germany (Media Control)	81
Netherlands (Dutch Top 40)	25
Netherlands (Single Top 100)	27
Sweden (Topplistan)	18

== Certifications ==
Region	Certification	Certified units/sales
Denmark (IFPI Danmark)	Gold	45,000^{‡}
New Zealand (RMNZ)	Gold	15,000^{‡}
Sweden (GLF)	Gold	25,000^{^}
^{^} Shipments figures based on certification alone.^{‡} Sales+streaming figures based on certification alone.

== Release history ==
Region	Date	Format(s)	Label(s)	Ref.
United Kingdom	30 April 1990	7-inch vinyl; 12-inch vinyl; CD	Virgin	
United Kingdom	29 May 1990	Cassette	Virgin	
Australia	11 June 1990	7-inch vinyl; cassette	Virgin	
Japan	21 June 1990	Mini-CD	Virgin	
Japan	4 July 1990	CD	Virgin	
Australia	9 July 1990	CD	Virgin	
Australia	16 July 1990	2×7-inch vinyl	Virgin	
