= Blodwyn Pig =

British blues rock band

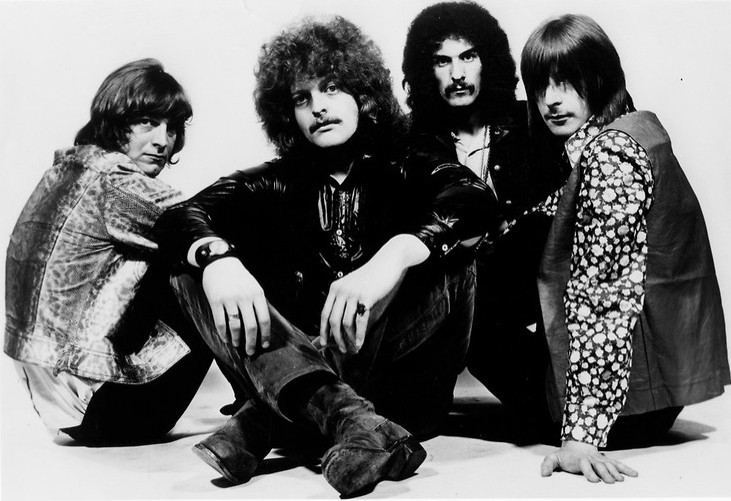
- Blodwyn Pig founding lineup L to R: Jack Lancaster, Mick Abrahams, Ron Berg, Andy Pyle

Background information
- Origin: England
- Genres: Blues rock
- Years active: 1968–1970, 1990s
- Labels: Island, A&M, Chrysalis
- Spinoff of: Jethro Tull
- Past members: Mick Abrahams; Andy Pyle; Jack Lancaster; Ron Berg; Peter Banks; Larry Wallis
- Website: squirrelmusic.com

Blodwyn Pig were a British blues rock band, founded in 1968 by guitarist–vocalist–songwriter Mick Abrahams.

== Career ==
Abrahams left Jethro Tull after their debut album, This Was, was released, due to a falling-out with Tull vocalist Ian Anderson over the direction of the band. He formed Blodwyn Pig with Jack Lancaster (saxophone and flute), Andy Pyle (bass guitar), and Ron Berg (drums).

With Abrahams and Lancaster in the lead, Blodwyn Pig recorded two albums, Ahead Rings Out in 1969 and Getting to This in 1970. Both reached the Top Ten of the UK Albums Chart and charted in Canada (#74/#38) and the United States (#149/#96); Ahead Rings Out displayed a jazzier turn on the heavy blues–rock that formed the band's core rooted in the British 1960s rhythm and blues scene from which sprang groups like The Yardbirds, Free and eventually Led Zeppelin. Saxophonist–singer Lancaster (who often played two horns at once, like his idol Rahsaan Roland Kirk) was at least as prominent in the mix as Abrahams; some critics thought this contrast bumped the band toward a freer, more experimental sound on the second album.

The single "Summer Day" failed to chart. However, the quartet became something of a favourite on the underground concert circuit.

Abrahams left the band and later developed another band and worked solo. Ex-Yes and future Flash guitarist Peter Banks became one of several guitarists, including Larry Wallis, to succeed Abrahams after he left.

Largely due to Abrahams's disillusionment with the business side of music, Blodwyn Pig eventually became an on-again, off-again concern; Lancaster at one point became a record producer, and Pyle eventually joined Savoy Brown and The Kinks. Over the years since their original formation, Blodwyn Pig reformed several times, usually with Abrahams and Lancaster leading the group. The band recorded two more albums in the 1990s.

On 19 December 2025, Mick Abrahams died at the age of 82.

== Discography ==
=== Singles ===
- "Dear Jill" / "Sweet Caroline" (Island Records WIP 6059), 1969
- "Walk On The Water" / "Summer Day" (Island Records WIP 6069), 1969
- "Same Old Story" / "Slow Down" (Chrysalis Records WIP 6078), 1970

=== Studio albums ===
- Ahead Rings Out (Chrysalis/Island/A&M), 1969
- Getting to This (Chrysalis/A&M Records), 1970
- Lies (Angel Air Records, 1994)
- Pig-in-the-Middle (1996)

=== Live albums/compilations ===
- All Tore Down: Live (1994)
- The Modern Alchemist (Indigo Records, 1997)
- All Said And Done (Shakedown Records, 2004) two-CD one-DVD boxed set
- The Radio Sessions 1969 to 1971 (Secret Records, 2012)
- All Said And Done - Double CD recorded in 2001 at Audiolab Studios Secret Records. Repressed in 2020
