= Ricky Brown =

American football player (born 1983)

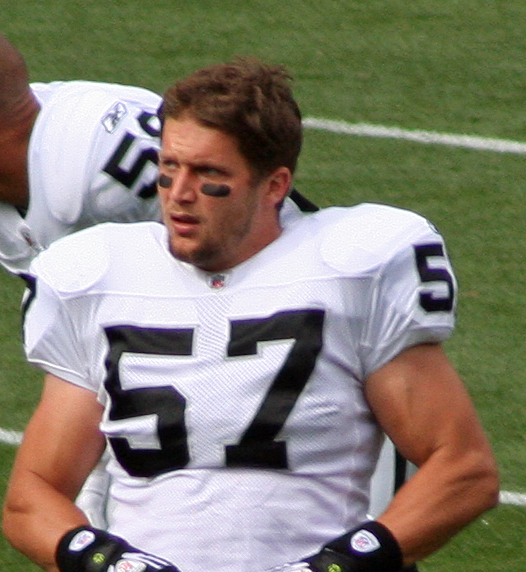
- Brown with the Oakland Raiders in 2010

Navy Midshipmen
- Title: Special teams coordinator & outside linebackers coach

Personal information
- Born: December 27, 1983 (age 42); Cincinnati, Ohio, U.S.
- Listed height: 6 ft 2 in (1.88 m)
- Listed weight: 235 lb (107 kg)

Career information
- High school: Elder (Cincinnati)
- College: Boston College (2002–2005)
- NFL draft: 2006: undrafted

Career history

Playing
- Oakland Raiders (2006–2010); New England Patriots (2011)*; Oakland Raiders (2011); Baltimore Ravens (2012)
- * Offseason or practice squad member only

Coaching
- USC (2014–2015) Quality Control Coach; Boston College (2016–2019); Quality Control Coach (2016); Special Teams Coordinator & Outside Linebackers Coach (2017–2019); Lafayette (2020) Linebackers Coach; Ohio State (2021) Quality Control Coach; Cincinnati (2022) Quality Control Coach; Navy (2023–present) Special Teams Coordinator & Outside Linebackers Coach

Awards and highlights
- 2002 Big East All-Rookie Team The Sporting News; 2005 Scanlan Award

Career NFL statistics
- Total tackles: 102
- Forced fumbles: 3
- Fumble recoveries: 2
- Pass deflections: 4
- Stats at Pro Football Reference

Richard Gerald Brown (born December 27, 1983) is an American former professional football player who was a linebacker in the National Football League (NFL), primarily for the Oakland Raiders. He is currently the Special Teams Coordinator and Outside Linebackers Coach for Navy. He played college football for the Boston College Eagles.

== Early life ==
Brown played football for Cincinnati Elder High School, where he played safety. Brown also ran track. Brown went on to win the 100m, 200m and 400m Greater Catholic League track titles in 2002.

== College career ==
Brown played college football at Boston College, where he played Linebacker. During his freshman year, 2002, Brown was a member of The Sporting News Big East All-Rookie Team. In 2005, Brown was a member of the ACC All-Academic Team. He was the winner of the 2005 Scanlan Award, an award given by the Boston College Varsity Club Award to the senior football player outstanding in scholarship, leadership, and athletic ability.

== Professional career ==
Pre-draft measurables
Height	Weight	40-yard dash	20-yard shuttle	Three-cone drill	Vertical jump	Broad jump	Bench press
6 ft 1 3/4 in (1.87 m)	230 lb (104 kg)	4.48 s	3.96 s	6.99 s	32 in (0.81 m)	9 ft 0 in (2.74 m)	18 reps
All values from Pro Day.

=== Oakland Raiders (first stint) ===
An undrafted free agent in 2006, Brown made a good impression with the Oakland Raiders during training camp and made it to the Raiders' practice squad. He was put on the active roster for the Week 5 game against the San Francisco 49ers when the Oakland Raiders waived J. P. Foschi to make room for Brown. Brown went on to play in the remaining 13 games of the 2006 season.

In 2007, Brown appeared in all 16 games, making his first career start against the Jacksonville Jaguars in Week 16.

Brown was a restricted exclusive rights free agent in 2008, re-signing with the Raiders in March. Brown won the starting SAM linebacker position in training camp and played in 7 games before a groin injury sidelined him before the week 9 match-up against the Atlanta Falcons. The groin injury ended up being a misdiagnosed sports hernia, or athletic pubalgia that eventually was surgically repaired after Brown was placed on Injured Reserve before the week 17 game against the Tampa Bay Buccaneers.

In 2009, Brown was a restricted free agent, and received a 2nd Round Tender from Oakland in March. Brown signed the 1-year deal, and went into training camp playing both the SAM and MIKE linebacker positions. Brown and Kirk Morrison were in competition for the MIKE linebacker position, eventually with Morrison playing MIKE and Brown playing SAM on 1st and 2nd downs, and Brown moving to MIKE on 3rd down, nickel situations. During the Raiders' week 5 match-up versus the New York Giants, Brown suffered an ankle injury that would eventually end his season. Brown attempted to rehab the injury, but was placed on Injured Reserve during week 11. Brown had surgery 2 weeks later on the ankle.

In 2010, Brown was a restricted free agent again, and received a 2nd Round Tender from Oakland in March. Brown signed the 1-year deal, and went into training camp as a back-up at MIKE linebacker behind 1st-round pick Rolando McClain. Brown went on to play in 14 games, including 1 start.

In 2011, Brown received a 2nd Round Tender from Oakland in March, but the tender rendered invalid when a new collective bargaining agreement was reached on July 25, 2011, bringing unrestricted free agency back to 4 accrued seasons.

=== New England Patriots ===
On August 20, 2011, signed a contract with the New England Patriots. The terms of the contract were not disclosed. He was released by the Patriots on September 2.

=== Oakland Raiders (second stint) ===
Brown re-signed with the Raiders on September 4. He was cut on November 29, 2011.

=== Baltimore Ravens ===
On July 25, 2012, Brown signed with the Baltimore Ravens. On August 31, 2012, Brown was place on injured reserve (head).

== Coaching career ==
Brown began his coaching career as a quality control assistant at USC in 2014, after a brief stint in the professional world as a wealth advisory associate for Morgan Stanley in Los Angeles.

Brown went on to coach at his alma mater, Boston College, in 2016 as the Director of Football Initiatives / Quality Control (Defense), then from 2017-2019 as the Special Teams Coordinator & Outside Linebackers Coach. He then would coach linebackers for the 2020 season at Lafayette.

Brown would return to his native Ohio, first at Ohio State for the 2021 season and then for the 2022 season at Cincinnati, both as a special teams quality control coach.

On February 28, 2023, Brown was announced as the Raiders/Strikers and Special Teams Coordinator for Navy under new head coach Brian Newberry.
