= Dick Brown (rugby league) =

Australian rugby league footballer

Personal information
- Full name: Richard Brown

Playing information
- Position: Hooker
Club
Years	Team	Pld	T	G	FG	P
1927–33	Eastern Suburbs	77	7	0	0	21
- Source: As of 21 June 2019

Richard ‘Dick’ Brown was a rugby league footballer in the Australian competition – the New South Wales Rugby League (NSWRL).

A hooker, Brown played in 77 matches for the Eastern Suburbs club in the years 1927–29 and 1931–33. Brown was a member of premiership deciders in 1928 and 1931, losing to local rival South Sydney on both occasions.

== Sources ==
- The Encyclopedia Of Rugby League; Alan Whiticker & Glen Hudson
- History Of The NSW Rugby League Finals; Steve Haddan
