= Richard Shaw Brown =

American musician and gemologist (born 1947)

Rick Brown
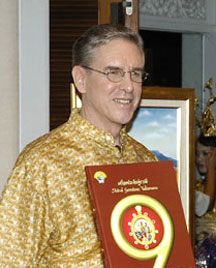
- Rick Brown in Bangkok – 2006

Background information
- Also known as: Hrisikesh
- Born: Richard Shaw Brown; April 26, 1947 (age 78)
- Origin: Florida, United States
- Genres: Progressive rock Blues rock Psychedelic rock Art rock Hard rock
- Occupation: Singer-songwriter
- Instrument: Harmonica
- Years active: 1964–1967 / 1982–1985
- Labels: Fontana Records; Cherry Red Records; Rough Trade Records; Ugly Things Records

Richard Shaw "Rick" Brown (born April 26, 1947) is an American musician and gemologist. He is perhaps best known for being the lead singer, harmonica player and co-songwriter of the psychedelic rock group The Misunderstood throughout the 1960s.

Richard Brown is working as a gemologist and jewellery designer in Bangkok and Thailand, for Astral Gemstone Talismans, a brand known for creating fine gems-jewelry based on the Navaratna belief in Jyotish.

== Band ==
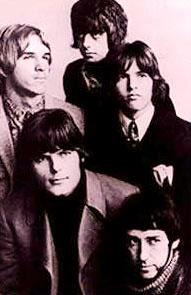
The classic Misunderstood in London – 1966. Rick Brown on left.

A review by Terrascope stated, "The Misunderstood were one of the most innovative and enigmatic bands of the Sixties and one of the psychedelic era's best loved groups." Brown's most well-known songs, "I Can Take You To The Sun" and "Children of the Sun", are considered psychedelic music classics. While working with the band in London, the group broke up when Brown was drafted by the US Army to go to Vietnam. He escaped from boot camp and left the country for India, where he was a fugitive for 12 years. Creem magazine, in a September 2004 review, wrote, "The saga of The Misunderstood is one of the most unbelievable, heartbreaking, and unlikely stories in the entire history of rock."

"I'm Not Talkin"
Sample of "Anti-war Psychedelic Song by The Misunderstood"

== India ==
In 1967 Brown was initiated as Hrisikesh Das by A.C. Bhaktivedanta Swami Prabhupada. He also lived as a monk and received instructions in Krishna bhakti from Swami Bon Maharaj in Vrindavana, U.P., India for six and a half years. Brown departed from Swami Bon and returned to his original guru, Bhaktivedanta Swami Prabhupada in late 1973. During his time in Asia, Brown learned to speak Bengali, Hindi and Thai, and read Sanskrit and Hindi.

=== Welfare activities in Asia ===
During his stay in India with Swami Bon Maharaj Brown was engaged in the establishment of Sri Krishna Chaitanya Academy, a primary school, in Nandagram, U.P., as well as expanding the Institute of Oriental Philosophy in Vrindavan, U.P. Before returning to America Brown was also instrumental in establishing Sri Hari-siddhi Primary School in Dhulikhel, Nepal. In 1999 he was a co-founder and is currently Acting Secretary of the Institute of Planetary Gemology in Bangkok, Thailand, a school that teaches the Navaratna system of Asian birthstones.

=== Influence in India ===
Through Swami Bon's educational service Brown moved in the highest circles of Indian society, even being received twice by India's President V.V. Giri at Rastrapati Bhavan in 1972. He successfully organized two high society functions in Bombay and Delhi during 1971–1972 which were supported by India's elite.

== Amnesty ==
In 1979, after 12 years in exile, Brown returned to America where he was granted amnesty as a conscientious objector and discharged from the Army.

== Post-Misunderstood music ==
In 1982, the two core members, the singer and the steel guitarist, reunited as "Influence" and recorded two self-penned tracks, "No Survivors" and "Queen of Madness", for UK's Rough Trade Records in 1983. They disbanded in 1985 when Campbell moved to New Zealand and Brown moved to Thailand.

Cherry Red Records (UK) released three albums of Misunderstood music: Before the Dream Faded (CDM RED 32) in 1992, The Legendary Goldstar Album (CDM RED 142) in 1997, and a full album of The Misunderstood's later material under the name of The Misunderstood: Broken Road (CDM RED 147) in 1998.

In 2004, Ugly Things Records (USA) issued another full album of unreleased tracks named The Lost Acetates 1965–1966, that received international media coverage.

A motion picture screenplay (The Misunderstood: WGA 977444) about the band and Rick Brown's adventures was written by rock historian Mike Stax (editor of Ugly Things music magazine) in 2002, and is under revision.

A novel, Like, Misunderstood, based on the script, was published in October 2007.

== Musical recognition ==
- In his "Peelennium" (Greatest Songs of the 20th Century) John Peel lists Brown's song "I Can Take You To The Sun" for 1966.
- Record Collector Magazine's book, 100 Greatest Psychedelic Records, lists "I Can Take You To The Sun" as the number 6 song.
- Mojo Magazine April 2009 – "I Can See For Miles: A-Z" lists The Misunderstood for "M".
- June 11, 2010 Classic Rock Magazine named The Misunderstood as No. 18 in their list of "Cult Heroes".

== Recent activities ==
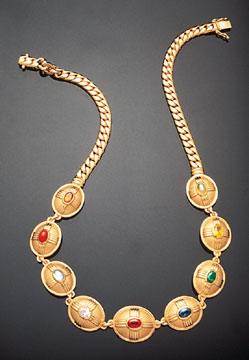
The Queen Sirikit Navaratna accepted by Her Majesty, the Queen of Thailand in 1993

In 1983 Brown graduated as "gemologist" from the Gemological Institute of America (GIA). Brown's book Ancient Astrological Gemstones & Talismans received the 1996 Benjamin Franklin Award from the Publishers Marketing Association (PMA).

He is currently working as a gemologist and jewelry designer in Bangkok, Thailand for the popular brand Astral Gemstone Talismans.

== Published books ==
1. Richard Brown (1975) Sri Chinta Mani, Astro Jewels Co.: Bangkok, Thailand.
2. Richard S. Brown (1982) Handbook of Planetary Gemology, AGS Inc.: Laguna Beach, California.
3. Richard S. Brown (1988) Handbook of Planetary Gemology II, Mckinney Intl.: Hong Kong.
4. Richard S. Brown (1995) Ancient Astrological Gemstones and Talismans, AGT LTD. ISBN 974-89022-4-2.
5. Richard S. Brown (2000) Astral Gemstone Talismans Designs 2000, AGT LTD. ISBN 974-87630-5-6.
6. Richard S. Brown (2002) Astral Gemstone Talismans 2002, AGT LTD. ISBN 974-88562-9-1.
7. Richard S. Brown (2003) VOOM Collection, Hrisikesh Ltd. ISBN 974-07-1633-4.
8. Richard S. Brown (2004) Six Collection, Hrisikesh Ltd. ISBN 974-91395-7-7.
9. Richard S. Brown (2005). Sri Chintamani Collection. Hrisikesh Ltd. ISBN 974-07-1643-1
10. Richard S. Brown (2006). Akash Collection. Hrisikesh Ltd. ISBN 974-93383-9-1
11. Richard S. Brown (2007). Mangala Navaratna Collection. Hrisikesh Ltd. ISBN 974-07-1853-1.
12. Rick Brown & Mike Stax (2007). Like, Misunderstood. UT Publishing, USA. ISBN 0-9778166-1-3.
13. Richard S. Brown (2007). Ancient Astrological Gemstones & Talismans – 2nd Edition. Hrisikesh LTD. ISBN 978-974-8102-29-0

== See also ==
- Jyotisha
- Gemology
