= After Hours (Gary Moore album) =

Studio album by Gary Moore
- Released: 9 March 1992
- Genre: Blues-rock, blues
- Length: 48:16
- Label: Virgin Records, Charisma (US Only)
- Producer: Gary Moore, Ian Taylor

Gary Moore chronology
Still Got the Blues (1990)	After Hours (1992)	Blues Alive (1993)

Singles from After Hours
- 1. "Cold Day in Hell" Released: 17 February 1992; 2. "Story of the Blues" Released: 27 April 1992; 3. "Since I Met You Baby" Released: 6 July 1992; 4. "Separate Ways" Released: 5 October 1992

Professional ratings
Review scores
Source	Rating
AllMusic	4.5/5 stars
The Penguin Guide to Blues Recordings	3/4 stars

After Hours is the ninth solo studio album by Northern Irish guitarist Gary Moore, released on 9 March 1992. The album features guest contributions from B.B. King and Albert Collins. It peaked at number four on the UK Albums Chart, making it Moore's highest-charting album in the UK.

== Track listing ==
All tracks written by Gary Moore, except where noted.

CD release
No.	Title	Writer(s)	Length
1.	"Cold Day in Hell"		4:27
2.	"Don't You Lie to Me (I Get Evil)"	Hudson Whittaker	2:30
3.	"Story of the Blues"		6:41
4.	"Since I Met You Baby" (Featuring B.B. King)		2:52
5.	"Separate Ways"		4:54
6.	"Only Fool in Town"		3:52
7.	"Key to Love"	John Mayall	1:59
8.	"Jumpin' at Shadows"	Duster Bennett	4:21
9.	"The Blues Is Alright" (with Albert Collins)	Milton Campbell	5:45
10.	"The Hurt Inside"		5:53
11.	"Nothing's the Same"		5:04

2002 remastered CD bonus tracks
No.	Title	Writer(s)	Length
12.	"All Time Low" (Extended version)		8:40
13.	"Woke Up This Morning"	B.B. King, Jules Taub	3:52
14.	"Movin' on Down the Road"		3:35
15.	"Don't Start Me Talkin'"	Sonny Boy Williamson	3:04
16.	"Once in a Blue Mood" (Instrumental)	Moore, Will Lee, Anton Fig, Tommy Eyre	7:34

== Personnel ==
- Gary Moore – guitar, vocals
- Will Lee, Bob Daisley, Andy Pyle, Johnny B. Gaydon – bass
- Graham Walker, Anton Fig – drums
- Tommy Eyre – keyboards
- Martin Drover – trumpet
- Frank Mead, Nick Pentelow, Nick Payn – saxophone
- Andrew Love, Wayne Jackson – The Memphis Horns
- Carol Kenyon, Linda Taylor – vocals
- Richard Morgan – oboe

== Guest contributors ==
- B.B. King – vocals and guitar on "Since I Met You Baby"
- Albert Collins – vocals and guitar on "The Blues is Alright", guitar on "Once in a Blue Mood"

== Charts ==
=== Weekly charts ===
Weekly chart performance for After Hours
Chart (1992)	Peak position
Australian Albums (ARIA)	8
Austrian Albums (Ö3 Austria)	6
Belgian Albums (BEA)	5
Danish Albums (Hitlisten)	2
Dutch Albums (Album Top 100)	3
European Albums (IFPI)	4
Finnish Albums (IFPI)	8
German Albums (Offizielle Top 100)	2
Greek Albums (IFPI)	3
Italian Albums (AFI)	9
Japanese Albums (Oricon)	7
New Zealand Albums (RMNZ)	9
Norwegian Albums (VG-lista)	2
Portuguese Albums (AFP)	8
Spanish Albums (AFYVE)	4
Swedish Albums (Sverigetopplistan)	1
Swiss Albums (Schweizer Hitparade)	1
UK Albums (OCC)	4
US Billboard 200	145

=== Year-end charts ===
Year-end chart performance for After Hours
Chart (1992)	Position
Dutch Albums (Album Top 100)	71
German Albums (Offizielle Top 100)	42
New Zealand Albums (RMNZ)	45
Swiss Albums (Schweizer Hitparade)	27

== Certifications ==
Certifications for After Hours
Region	Certification	Certified units/sales
Australia (ARIA)	Gold	35,000^{^}
Italy (FIMI)	Gold	50,000^{*}
Japan (RIAJ)	Gold	100,000^{^}
New Zealand (RMNZ)	Platinum	15,000^{^}
Spain (Promusicae)	Gold	50,000^{^}
Sweden (GLF)	Platinum	100,000^{^}
United Kingdom (BPI)	Gold	100,000^{^}
United States	—	200,000
^{*} Sales figures based on certification alone.^{^} Shipments figures based on certification alone.
