= Still Got the Blues =

Studio album by Gary Moore
- Released: 26 March 1990
- Genre: Blues rock, blues
- Length: 52:56
- Label: Virgin
- Producer: Gary Moore, Ian Taylor

Gary Moore chronology
After the War (1989)	Still Got the Blues (1990)	After Hours (1992)

Singles from Still Got the Blues
- 1. "Oh Pretty Woman" Released: 5 March 1990; 2. "Still Got the Blues (For You)" Released: 30 April 1990; 3. "Walking By Myself" Released: 6 August 1990; 4. "Too Tired" Released: 19 November 1990

Still Got the Blues is the eighth solo studio album by Northern Irish guitarist Gary Moore, released in March 1990. It marked a substantial change in style for Moore, who had been predominantly known for rock and hard rock music with Skid Row, Thin Lizzy, G-Force and Greg Lake, and during his own extensive solo career, as well as his jazz fusion work with Colosseum II. Still Got the Blues saw him delve into an electric blues style. The album features guest contributions from Albert King, Albert Collins and George Harrison.

The title track was released as a single and reached No. 97 on the Billboard Hot 100 on 16 February 1991. It is the only single of Moore's to chart on the Billboard Hot 100. The album reached No. 83 on the Billboard 200 on 16 February 1991, then was certified gold by the RIAA in November 1995. This was Moore's most successful album both in terms of sales and chart position in the US.

== Reception ==
Professional ratings
Review scores
Source	Rating
Allmusic	4.5/5 stars
The Penguin Guide to Blues Recordings	3/4 stars

Juke said, "It's far from a special album, and Moore's lack of songwriting clout lets him down as usual. But compared to the last few LPs, he's doing that he feels, and his playing is quite lovely, even if the album has a 70s feel."

== Track listing ==
Side one

1. "Moving On" – (Gary Moore) – 2:39
  - Gary Moore – guitar, vocals
  - Mick Weaver – piano
  - Andy Pyle – bass
  - Graham Walker – drums
2. "Oh Pretty Woman" – (A. C. Williams) – 4:25
  - Gary Moore – guitar, vocals
  - Albert King – guitar
  - Raoul D'Olivera – trumpet
  - Frank Mead – alto and tenor saxophones
  - Nick Pentelow – tenor saxophone
  - Nick Payn – baritone saxophone
  - Don Airey – Hammond organ
  - Andy Pyle – bass
  - Graham Walker – drums
3. "Walking By Myself" – (Jimmy Rogers) – 2:56
  - Gary Moore – guitar, vocals
  - Frank Mead – harmonica
  - Mick Weaver – piano
  - Andy Pyle – bass
  - Graham Walker – drums
4. "Still Got the Blues (For You)" – (Moore) – 6:12
  - Gary Moore – guitar, vocals
  - Gavyn Wright – leader of the string section
  - Don Airey – keyboards
  - Nicky Hopkins – piano
  - Andy Pyle – bass
  - Graham Walker – drums
5. "Texas Strut" – (Moore) – 4:51
  - Gary Moore – guitar, vocals
  - Don Airey – Hammond organ
  - Bob Daisley – bass
  - Brian Downey – drums

Side two

1. "Too Tired" – (Johnny "Guitar" Watson, Maxwell Davies, Saul Bihari) – 2:51
  - Gary Moore – guitar, vocals
  - Albert Collins – guitar
  - Stuart Brooks – trumpet
  - Frank Mead – alto saxophone
  - Nick Pentelow – tenor saxophone
  - Nick Payn – baritone saxophone
  - Don Airey – piano
  - Andy Pyle – bass
  - Graham Walker – drums
2. "King of the Blues" – (Moore) – 4:36
  - Gary Moore – guitar, vocals
  - Raoul D'Olivera – trumpet
  - Frank Mead – alto and tenor saxophones
  - Nick Pentelow – tenor saxophone
  - Nick Payn – baritone saxophone
  - Don Airey – Hammond organ
  - Andy Pyle – bass
  - Brian Downey – drums
3. "As the Years Go Passing By" – (Deadric Malone) – 7:46
  - Gary Moore – guitar, vocals
  - Frank Mead – tenor saxophones
  - Nick Payn – baritone saxophone
  - Don Airey – Hammond organ
  - Nicky Hopkins – piano
  - Bob Daisley – bass
  - Brian Downey – drums
4. "Midnight Blues" – (Moore) – 4:58
  - Gary Moore – guitar, vocals
  - Gavyn Wright – leader of the string section
  - Mick Weaver – electric piano
  - Andy Pyle – bass
  - Graham Walker – drums

CD Release Bonus Tracks

10. "That Kind of Woman" – (George Harrison) – 4:32
  - Gary Moore – lead guitar, lead vocals
  - George Harrison – rhythm and slide guitars, backing vocals
  - Martin Drover – trumpet
  - Frank Mead – alto saxophone
  - Nick Pentelow – tenor saxophone
  - Nick Payn – baritone saxophone
  - Nicky Hopkins – piano
  - Bob Daisley – bass
  - Graham Walker – drums
11. "All Your Love" – Otis Rush – 3:32
  - Gary Moore – guitar, vocals
  - Mick Weaver – Hammond organ
  - Andy Pyle – bass
  - Graham Walker – drums
12. "Stop Messin' Around" – (Clifford Davis, Peter Green) – 4:00
  - Gary Moore – guitar, vocals
  - Frank Mead – saxophone
  - Mick Weaver – piano
  - Andy Pyle – bass
  - Graham Walker – drums

2002 remastered CD bonus tracks
No.	Title	Writer(s)	Length
13.	"The Stumble" (Instrumental)	Freddy King, Sonny Thompson	3:01
14.	"Left Me with the Blues"	Moore	3:05
15.	"Further On Up the Road"	Don Robey, Joe Medwick	4:08
16.	"Mean Cruel Woman"	Moore	2:48
17.	"The Sky Is Crying"	Elmore James	4:54

== Personnel ==
- Gary Moore – lead vocals, lead and rhythm guitars
- Don Airey – keyboards
- Stuart Brooks – trumpet
- Albert Collins – guitar
- Bob Daisley – bass guitar
- Raul d'Oliveira – trumpet
- Brian Downey – drums
- Martin Drover – trumpet
- George Harrison – guitar, vocals
- Nicky Hopkins – keyboards
- Albert King – guitar
- Frank Mead – saxophone
- Nick Payn – saxophone
- Nick Pentelow – saxophone
- Andy Pyle – bass guitar
- Graham Walker – drums
- Mick Weaver – piano
- Gavyn Wright – strings

== Chart positions ==
=== Weekly charts ===
Chart (1990–2017)	Peak position
Australian Albums (ARIA)	5
Austrian Albums (Ö3 Austria)	13
Dutch Albums (Album Top 100)	1
Finnish Albums (Suomen virallinen lista)	1
German Albums (Offizielle Top 100)	4
Hungarian Albums (MAHASZ)	39
Japanese Albums (Oricon)	17
New Zealand Albums (RMNZ)	14
Norwegian Albums (VG-lista)	2
Swedish Albums (Sverigetopplistan)	1
Swiss Albums (Schweizer Hitparade)	3
UK Albums (Official Charts)	13
US Billboard 200	83
US Top Current Album Sales (Billboard)	83

=== Year-end charts ===
Chart (1990)	Position
Australian Albums (ARIA)	32
Austrian Albums (Ö3 Austria)	24
Dutch Albums (Album Top 100)	7
German Albums (Offizielle Top 100)	12
Japanese Albums (Oricon)	87
New Zealand Albums (RMNZ)	31
Swiss Albums (Schweizer Hitparade)	7

== Certifications ==
Sales certifications for Still Got the Blues
Region	Certification	Certified units/sales
Australia (ARIA)	Platinum	70,000^{^}
Belgium (BRMA)	Gold	25,000^{*}
Denmark (IFPI Danmark)	Platinum	80,000^{^}
Finland (Musiikkituottajat)	Gold	25,000
Germany (BVMI)	Gold	250,000^{^}
Greece (IFPI Greece)	Gold	30,000
Japan (RIAJ)	Gold	112,500
Netherlands (NVPI)	Platinum	100,000^{^}
New Zealand (RMNZ)	2× Platinum	30,000^{^}
Spain (Promusicae)	Gold	50,000^{^}
Sweden (GLF)	2× Platinum	200,000^{^}
Switzerland (IFPI Switzerland)	Platinum	50,000^{^}
United Kingdom (BPI)	Platinum	300,000^{^}
United States (RIAA)	Gold	500,000^{^}
^{*} Sales figures based on certification alone.^{^} Shipments figures based on certification alone.
