= Andy Pyle =

British bassist (born 1946)

Background information
- Born: 25 November 1946 (age 79); Luton, Bedfordshire, England
- Genre: Blues
- Instrument: Bass guitar

Andy Pyle (born 25 November 1946) is a British bassist who is best known for playing with the Kinks from 1976 to 1978. Prior to that, he was in Blodwyn Pig (1968–1972) and Savoy Brown (1972–1974). Later, he played with Wishbone Ash (1986–1987, 1991–1993).

== Career ==
A musician whose career dates back to the mid-1960s, Pyle was born in Luton in 1946 and reached his teenage years when rock & roll supplanted skiffle as the music of choice for British youth. As a budding young musician, however, he was turning more towards blues than rock & roll, as evidenced by his first professional concert with Victor Brox's Blues Train, directed by the future member of the Aynsley Dunbar Retaliation. Then, Jensen's Moods, a band composed of British bluesman Mick Abrahams on guitar and vocals, Pete Fensome on vocals and Clive Bunker on drums, who then changed their name to McGregor's Engine.

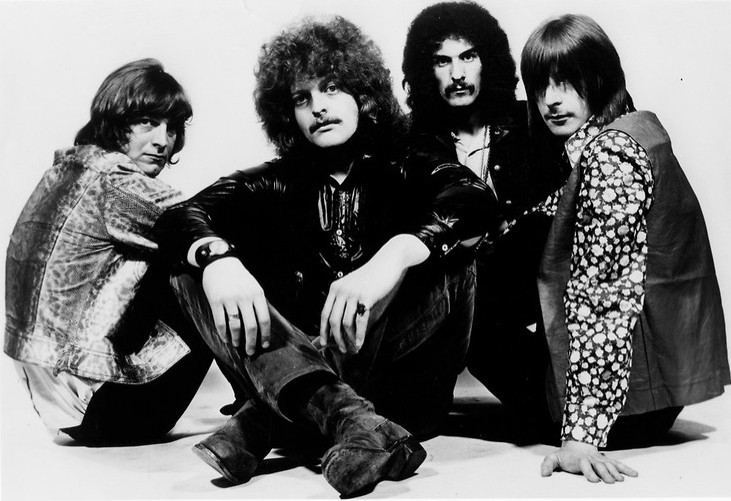
Andy Pyle (first from right) as part of Blodwyn Pig in 1969

Pyle continued his career with the McGregor's Engine group in his home town of Luton, Bedfordshire, in 1967. That same year, Abrahams caught the attention of flautist-singer Ian Anderson, while McGregor's Engine first played John Evan Band with which officiates Anderson, during a concert. When Bunker and Abrahams left McGregor's Engine to form Jethro Tull with Ian Anderson on flute and vocals and Glenn Cornick on bass, Pyle continued to play with local bands. Abrahams left Jethro Tull after the first album This Was, following a dispute with Anderson about the band's future, to form Blodwyn Pig with Pyle on bass, Jack Lancaster on saxophone and Ron Berg on drums. After the Blodwyn Pig disbanded, Pyle joined Juicy Lucy (who includes Micky Moody who would play later with Whitesnake) and Savoy Brown, as well as sessions for Rod Stewart on his 1971 album, Every Picture Tells a Story.

From 1975 to 1976, Pyle spent a year recording and playing with guitarist Alvin Lee, a former Ten Years After guitarist. He played on Lee's first solo album, Pump Iron with former King Crimson musicians, Boz Burrell on bass, Ian Wallace on drums, and Mel Collins on saxophone. The same year, he participated in the concept album Peter and the Wolf by Jack Lancaster and Robin Lumley, with musicians of different horizons, Alvin Lee, Gary Moore and John Goodsall on guitar, Percy Jones and Dave Marquee at the bass, Brian Eno, Manfred Mann on synths, Bill Bruford and Phil Collins on drums, Stephane Grapelli on violin, etc.

At the end of 1976, Pyle auditioned for the bassist position with the Kinks following the departure of John Dalton. He played on Mr. Big Man on the band's 1977 album Sleepwalker, the single only track "Father Christmas" and 1978's Misfits, where he only appeared on six of the ten songs, before leaving with keyboardist John Gosling. The two formed an ephemeral group, initially called United (with future Iron Maiden guitarist, Dennis Stratton), then Network. His work with them was short-lived, since he was then called by his old friend Gary Moore, with whom he had previously worked as a session musician, to join his band in a series of live dates, which resulted in an album Live at The Marquee. Pyle then joined a reformed version of Chicken Shack before teaming up with their leader Stan Webb in the Speedway band. In the mid-1980s, he joined Wishbone Ash, then Mick Abrahams and Clive Bunker, as well as Dick Heckstall-Smith making their return for another tour with Blodwyn Pig. With Bernie Marsden, he was part of the Green & Blue All-Stars, and he was back with Gary Moore, this time in the Midnight Blues Band. He spent most of the early to mid-1990s working with Moore, then back in Wishbone Ash and Juicy Lucy. Even though he played everything from traditional rock to hard rock, he prefers blues and performed in the Carey Bell and Nappy Brown sessions in the 1980s.

Pyle produced his only solo album in 1985 titled Barrier Language which was only issued in Germany and went virtually unnoticed elsewhere. After the departure of Mervyn Spence, Pyle was offered the vacant bassist position at Wishbone Ash in early 1986. An intensive touring period ensued, including appearances in Russia in 1987, before Pyle gave in to allow the reform of the original Wishbone Ash. However, Andy Powell and Pyle remained close friends and continued to collaborate on songs. Pyle is also co-author of the title track of the album Strange Affair. Pyle, meanwhile, joined Gary Moore once again and appeared on the album Still Got the Blues in 1990.

In 1991, Pyle joined Wishbone Ash following the second split of Martin Turner with the band. A two-year period of touring followed, as evidenced by the 1992 film The Ash Live in Chicago. In 1994, he met Mick Abrahams and Blodwyn Pig when he appeared on the I Wonder Who song on the album Lies.

More recently, Pyle played on the album Running Blind (2002) as a member of ex-Uriah Heep Ken Hensley's solo band. He also performed in a concert with Ken Hensley and John Wetton, who was filmed and recorded for the DVD release of More Than Conquerors in 2002.

== Discography ==
=== Solo ===
1985: Barrier Language

=== With Blodwyn Pig ===
Studio albums :

- 1969: Ahead Rings Out
- 1970: Getting to This
- 1994: Lies – Pyle plays on I Wonder Who

Live albums:

- 1997: Live At The Lafayette – recorded in 1993
- 1997: The Modern Alchemist
- 2000: The Basement Tapes
- 2002: Live At The Marquee Club London 1974 (The Official Bootleg)
- 2012: Radio Sessions '69 to '71
- 2003: Rough Gems (Official Bootleg Number 2)

Compilation:

- 2013: Pigthology

=== With Rod Stewart ===
- 1971: Every Picture Tells a Story

=== With Juicy Lucy ===
- 1972: Pieces

=== With Savoy Brown ===
- 1972: Lion's Share
- 1973: Jack the Toad

=== With Gerry Lockran ===
1972: Wun – Pyle plays on Maybe Not Up, Tired Neal Groans and She Was A Very Good Friend Of Mine

=== With Alvin Lee ===
- 1976: Pump Iron

=== With The Kinks ===
- 1977: Sleepwalker – Pyle plays on Mr. Big Man
- 1978: Misfits – Pyle plays on nine of the album's ten songs

=== With Gary Moore ===
- 1983: Live at the Marquee
- 1990: Still Got the Blues
- 1993: Blues Alive
- 1995: Blues for Greeny – tribute album to Peter Green

=== With Wishbone Ash ===
- 1992: The Ash Live in Chicago

=== With Ken Hensley ===
- 2002: Running Blind – with John Wetton on bass and vocals, Dave Kilminster on guitar and John Young on keyboards, plus three drummers

=== With Ken Hensley & John Wetton ===
- 2002: More Than Conquerors(DVD) – with the same line-up

=== Collaboration ===
- 1975: Peter and the Wolf by Jack Lancaster and Robin Lumley – with Brian Eno, Phil Collins, Gary Moore, Stephane Grapelli, Bill Bruford, John Goodsall, Percy Jones, Julie Tippett, Keith Tippett, etc. Pyle plays on "Duck Theme" and "Rock And Roll Celebration".

== Sources ==
- Andy Pyle | Biography & History
- Mick Abrahams
- Andy Pyle discography at Discogs
- Blodwyn Pig Albums
- Alvin Lee Discography
- Wishbone Ash – Live In Chicago
- Ken Hensley Running Blind : KEN HENSLEY – Running Blind (2002)
- Ken Hensley/John Wetton : KEN HENSLEY – Ken Hensley & John Wetton. More Than Conquerors (2002)
- Jack Lancaster, Robin Lumley – The Rock Peter And The Wolf
