= Gary Moore discography =

Albums, Singles, etc. by Gary Moore

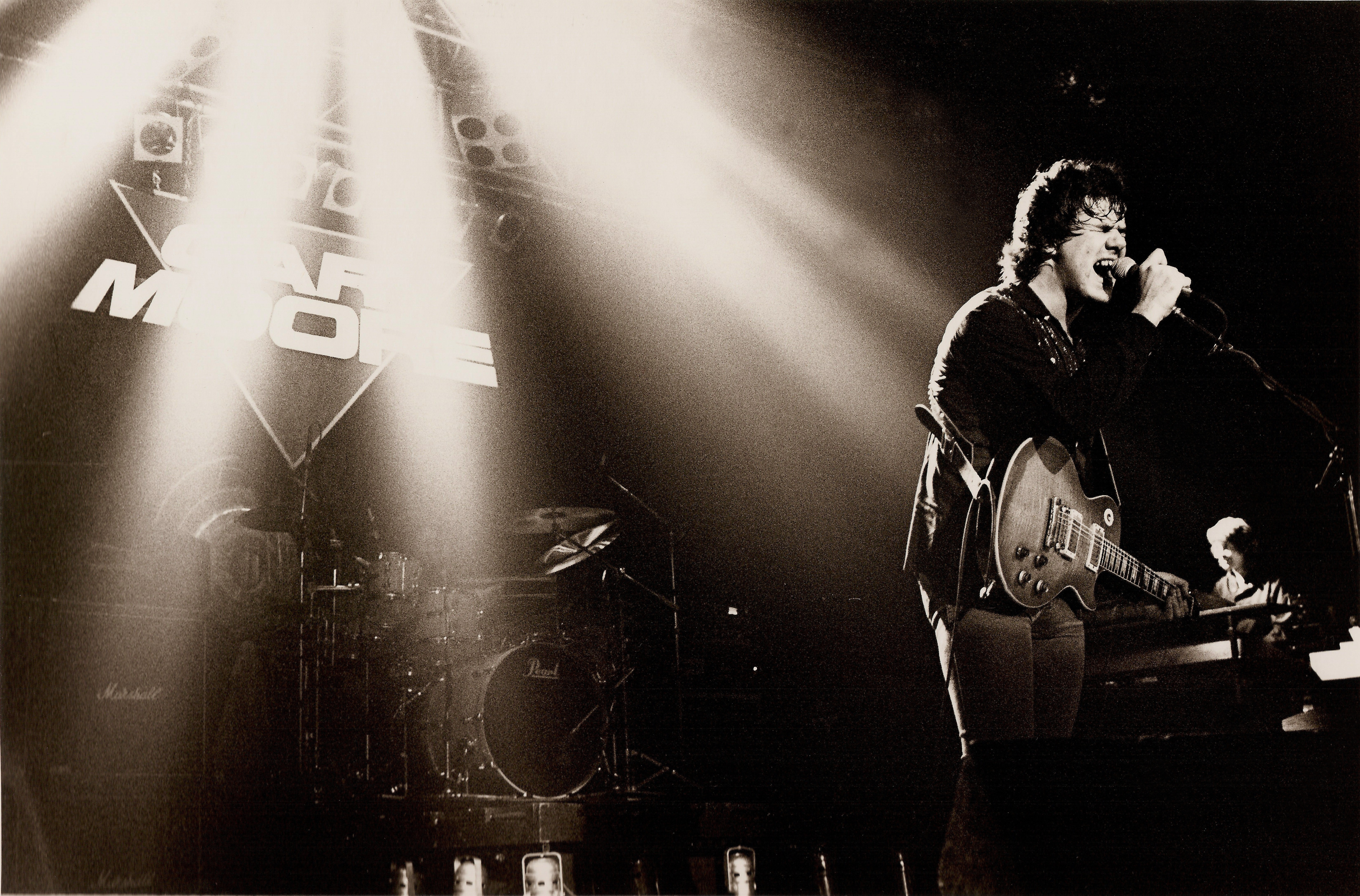
- Studio albums: 18
- Live albums: 9
- Compilation albums: 12
- Singles: 53

This is the discography of the Northern Irish blues, heavy metal and hard rock guitarist and singer-songwriter Gary Moore.

== Albums ==
=== Solo studio albums ===
Year	Title	Peak chart positions											Certifications (sales thresholds)
Year	Title	UK	AUS	AUT	FIN	GER	NZ	NOR	SWE	SWI	US	US Blues	Certifications (sales thresholds)
1978	Back on the Streets: Released: September 1978; Label: MCA	70	—	—	—	—	—	—	—	—	—	—	
1982	Corridors of Power: Released: October 1982; Label: Virgin	30	—	—	—	—	—	—	—	—	149	—	
1983	Dirty Fingers: Released: April 1983 (Japan) / 1984 (Europe); Recorded in 1980; Label: Jet	—	—	—	—	—	—	—	—	—	—	—	
1984	Victims of the Future: Released: 30 January 1984; Label: Virgin	12	—	—	7	53	—	—	15	—	172	—	
1985	Run for Cover: Released: 2 September 1985; Label: Virgin	12	73	—	10	27	23	7	6	—	146	—	UK: Silver; SWE: Gold
1987	Wild Frontier: Released: 2 March 1987; Label: Virgin	8	41	16	1	9	11	1	2	7	139	—	UK: Silver; SWE: Platinum; FIN: Gold
1989	After the War: Released: 25 January 1989; Label: Virgin	23	62	—	3	2	14	3	3	3	114	—	UK: Silver; SWE: Gold; GER: Gold
1990	Still Got the Blues: Released: 26 March 1990; Label: Virgin; Format: LP, CD	13	5	13	1	4	14	2	1	3	83	—	UK: Platinum; SWE: 2× Platinum; FIN: Gold; AUS: Platinum; GER: Gold; US: Gold; SWI: Platinum
1992	After Hours: Released: 9 March 1992; Label: Virgin	4	8	6	8	2	9	2	1	1	145	—	UK: Gold; SWE: Platinum
1995	Blues for Greeny: Released: 29 May 1995; Label: Virgin	14	59	—	14	33	—	31	40	26	—	5	
1997	Dark Days in Paradise: Released: 26 May 1997; Label: Virgin	43	161	19	27	32	—	27	23	22	—	—	
1999	A Different Beat: Released: 27 September 1999; Label: Raw Power / Castle	133	—	—	—	60	—	—	—	—	—	—	
2001	Back to the Blues: Released: 12 March 2001; Label: Sanctuary	53	—	68	36	40	—	—	22	49	—	6	
2004	Power of the Blues: Released: 22 June 2004; Label: Sanctuary	158	—	—	—	65	—	—	51	—	—	9	
2006	Old New Ballads Blues: Released: 2 May 2006; Label: Eagle	148	—	—	—	91	—	—	—	—	—	6	
2007	Close As You Get: Released: 21 May 2007; Label: Eagle	102	—	—	—	66	—	—	—	95	—	7	
2008	Bad for You Baby: Released: 22 September 2008; Label: Eagle	101	—	—	—	69	—	—	—	71	—	2	
2021	How Blue Can You Get: Released: 30 April 2021; Label: Provogue	54	—	—	—	22	—	—	—	18	—	—	
"—" denotes a release that did not chart.

=== With other projects ===
Year	Title	Peak chart positions						
Year	Title	UK	AUT	FIN	GER	NZ	SWE	SWI
1973	Grinding Stone: The Gary Moore Band; Released: 1973; Label: CBS	—	—	—	—	—	—	—
1980	G-Force: G-Force; Released: 30 May 1980; Label: JVC Japan	—	—	—	—	—	—	—
1994	Around the Next Dream: BBM (with Jack Bruce & Ginger Baker); Released: 17 May 1994; Label: Virgin	9	28	14	20	17	13	25
2002	Scars: Scars (with Cass Lewis & Darrin Mooney); Released: 10 September 2002; Label: Sanctuary	90	—	—	48	—	—	31
"—" denotes a release that did not chart.

=== Live albums ===
Year	Title	Peak chart positions										Certifications (sales thresholds)
Year	Title	UK	AUS	AUT	FIN	GER	NOR	SWE	SWI	US	US Blues	Certifications (sales thresholds)
1983	Rockin' Every Night – Live in Japan: Released: 21 May 1983; Label: Virgin	99	91	—	37	—	—	—	—	—	—	
1983	Live at the Marquee: Recorded: 5–6 November 1980; Released: 21 September 1983; Label: Jet	—	—	—	—	—	—	—	—	—	—	
1984	We Want Moore!: Recorded: February & June 1984; Released: October 1984; Label: Virgin	32	—	—	21	52	—	21	—	—	—	
1993	Blues Alive: Recorded: May - October 1992; Released: 10 May 1993; Label: Virgin	8	73	14	—	31	18	40	14	—	—	UK: Gold
2003	Live at Monsters of Rock: Released: 30 September 2003; Label: Sanctuary	—	—	—	—	—	—	—	—	—	—	
2010	Live at Montreux 2010: Released: 19 September 2011; Label: Eagle	—	—	—	—	41	—	—	—	—	10	
2012	Blues for Jimi: Recorded: 25 October 2007; Release date: 24 September 2012; Label: Eagle	80	—	56	—	36	—	—	—	—	4	
2014	Live at Bush Hall 2007: Release date: 22 September 2014; Label: Eagle / Universal Music Group	128	—	—	—	—	—	—	—	—	5	
2020	Live from London: Released: 31 January 2020; Label: Mascot, Provogue	70	—	17	—	10	—	—	84	34	1	
"—" denotes a release that did not chart.

=== Compilation albums ===
Year	Title	Peak chart positions											Certifications (sales thresholds)
Year	Title	UK	AUS	AUT	FIN	GER	NZ	NOR	SWE	SWI	US	US Blues	Certifications (sales thresholds)
1982	Gary Moore: Japan-only release; Released: 1982; Label: MCA	—	—	—	—	—	—	—	—	—	—	—	
1988	And Then the Man Said to His Guitar..: Released: 1988; Label: Accord	—	—	—	—	—	—	—	—	—	—	—	
1994	Ballads & Blues 1982–1994: Released: 14 November 1994; Label: Virgin	33	142	—	4	30	26	6	10	15	—	14	UK: Gold; FIN: Gold; NOR: Gold; SWI: Gold
1996	Streets & Walkways: The Best of Gary Moore & Colosseum II: Released: December 1996; Label: Music Club	—	—	—	—	—	—	—	—	—	—	—	
1998	Out in the Fields – The Very Best of Gary Moore: Released: 19 October 1998; Label: Virgin	54	—	—	—	—	—	10	13	—	—	—	SWE: Gold
1999	Blood of Emeralds – The Very Best of Gary Moore Part 2: Released: September 1999 (Sweden); Label: Virgin	—	—	—	—	—	—	—	13	—	—	—	
2002	The Best of the Blues: Also known as Walking By Myself – The Best of the Blues; Released: February 2002; Label: Virgin	112	—	—	—	—	—	20	10	98	—	12	
2002	Have Some Moore: The Best Of Gary Moore: Released: 2002 (Finland); Label: EMI / Virgin	—	—	—	7	—	—	—	—	—	—	—	FIN: Gold
2003	The Essential Gary Moore: Re-packaging of Ballads & Blues 1982–1994; Released: 24 June 2003; Label: Virgin	—	—	—	—	—	—	—	—	—	—	—	
2003	Parisienne Walkways: The Blues Collection: Released: 18 August 2003; Label: EMI Gold	—	—	—	—	—	—	—	—	—	—		
2003	Back on the Streets: The Rock Collection: Released: 20 August 2003; Label: EMI Gold	—	—	—	—	—	—	—	—	—	—	—	
2006	The Platinum Collection: Released: 4 September 2006; Label: Virgin	118^{[X]}	—	—	—	—	—	—	45^{[X]}	—	—		
2008	Have Some Moore 2: The Best Of Gary Moore: Released: 2008; Label: EMI / Capitol	—	—	—	—	—	—	—	—	—	—	—	
2009	Essential Montreux: Special Edition 5CD Set; Released: 16 June 2009; Label: Eagle	—	—	—	—	—	—	—	—	—	—	—	
2012	Legacy: Released: 1 October 2012; Label: Music Club Deluxe	173	—	—	—	—	—	—	—	—	—	—	
2017	Blues and Beyond: Double CD, 4 LP and Box Set; Released: 24 November 2017; Label: BMG	—	—	—	—	—	—	—	—	—	—	3	
2020	Parisienne Walkways: The Collection: Double CD; Released: 17 January 2020; Label: BMG	—	—	—	—	—	—	—	—	—	—	4	
"—" denotes a release that did not chart.

Notes

- X The Platinum Collection did not chart in UK and Sweden until February 2011.

== Singles ==
Year	Title	Peak chart positions										Album
Year	Title	UK	AUS	FIN	GER	IRE	NZ	NOR	SWE	US	US Rock	Album
1978	"Back on the Streets"	—	—	—	—	—	—	—	—	—	—	Back on the Streets
1979	"Parisienne Walkways"	8	—	—	—	5	—	—	—	—	—	Back on the Streets
1979	"Spanish Guitar"	—	—	—	—	—	—	—	—	—	—	
1981	"Nuclear Attack" (Gary Moore & Friends)	—	—	—	—	—	—	—	—	—	—	Dirty Fingers
1982	"Always Gonna Love You"	—	—	—	—	—	—	—	—	103	—	Corridors of Power
1983	"Falling in Love with You"	—	—	—	—	—	—	—	—	110	—	Corridors of Power
1984	"Hold on to Love"	65	—	—	—	—	—	—	—	—	—	Victims of the Future
1984	"Shapes of Things"	77	—	—	—	—	—	—	—	—	—	Victims of the Future
1984	"Empty Rooms"	51	—	—	—	—	—	—	—	—	—	Victims of the Future
1984	"Don't Let Me Be Misunderstood"	—	—	—	—	—	—	—	—	—	—	Dirty Fingers
1985	"Out in the Fields" (with Phil Lynott)	5	62	24	14	3	21	2	2	—	—	Run for Cover
1985	"Empty Rooms" (Summer 1985 version)	23	100	—	—	12	48	—	—	—	—	Run for Cover
1985	"Run for Cover"	—	—	—	—	—	—	—	—	—	—	Run for Cover
1985	"Listen to Your Heartbeat"	—	—	—	—	—	—	—	—	—	—	Run for Cover
1986	"Over the Hills and Far Away"	20	94	1	—	6	43	1	7	—	24	Wild Frontier
1987	"Wild Frontier"	35	85	4	—	22	—	—	—	—	—	Wild Frontier
1987	"Friday on My Mind"	26	25	15	—	18	30	—	—	—	—	Wild Frontier
1987	"The Loner"	53	—	—	—	—	—	—	—	—	—	Wild Frontier
1987	"Take a Little Time"	75	—	—	—	—	—	—	—	—	—	Wild Frontier
1989	"After the War"	37	151	5	—	14	36	4	12	—	—	After the War
1989	"Ready for Love"	56	113	26	—	—	—	—	—	—	13	After the War
1989	"Led Clones"	—	—	—	—	—	—	—	—	—	—	After the War
1989	"Livin' on Dreams"	—	—	—	—	—	—	—	—	—	—	After the War
1990	"Oh Pretty Woman" (with Albert King)	48	50	—	—	—	—	—	—	—	15	Still Got the Blues
1990	"Still Got the Blues (For You)"	31	18	17	28	28	—	3	4	97	9	Still Got the Blues
1990	"Walking by Myself"	48	55	—	—	—	—	—	—	—	—	Still Got the Blues
1990	"Too Tired" (featuring Albert Collins)	71	130	—	—	—	—	—	—	—	—	Still Got the Blues
1992	"Cold Day in Hell"	24	42	—	29	—	31	4	24	—	22	After Hours
1992	"Story of the Blues"	40	124	—	99	—	—	—	—	—	37	After Hours
1992	"Since I Met You Baby" (with B.B. King)	59	124	—	—	—	—	—	—	—	—	After Hours
1992	"Separate Ways"	59	—	—	—	—	—	—	—	—	—	After Hours
1993	"Parisienne Walkways '93" (live)	32	—	—	—	—	—	—	—	—	—	Blues Alive
1994	"Where in the World"; BBM (with Jack Bruce & Ginger Baker)	57	—	—	—	—	—	—	—	—	—	Around the Next Dream
1994	"One Day"	—	—	—^{[*]}	—	—	—	—	—	—	—	Ballads & Blues 1982–1994
1995	"Need Your Love So Bad"	48	—	—	—	—	—	—	—	—	—	Blues for Greeny
1997	"One Good Reason"	79	—	—	—	—	—	—	—	—	—	Dark Days in Paradise
1997	"I Have Found My Love in You"	90	—	—	—	—	—	—	—	—	—	Dark Days in Paradise
1997	"Always There for You" (vs. Professor Stretch)	—	—	—	—	—	—	—	—	—	—	Dark Days in Paradise
2001	"Picture of the Moon"	—	—	—	—	—	—	—	—	—	—	Back to the Blues
2011	"Parisienne Walkways"	127	—	—	—	—	—	—	—	—	—	The Platinum Collection
2011	"Still Got the Blues"	—	—	—	62	—	—	—	—	—	—	The Platinum Collection
"—" denotes a release that did not chart or was not issued in that region.

Notes

- '* "One Day" did not chart on the Finnish Singles Chart, but it did reach #23 on the Finnish Top 50 Hits Chart (50 Hittiä) which combined sales and airplay.

== Granny's Intentions ==
=== Album ===
- Honest Injun (Deram, 1970) (gt on 8 tracks, Johnny Hockedy on 3)

== Skid Row ==
=== Albums ===
- Skid (CBS, October 1970) #30 UK
- 34 Hours (CBS, 1971)
- Skid Row (a.k.a. 'Dublin Gas Comy.') – CBS demos recorded early 1970 (CBS, 1990)
- Skid Row (a.k.a. 'Gary Moore/Brush Shiels/Noel Bridgeman') – Gary Moore version of the unreleased third album recorded late 1971 (Castle, 1990)
- Live And On Song – Both sides of Skid Row's first two singles on the Song label recorded 1969, plus a BBC 'In Concert' recording from 1971 (Hux, 2006)

=== Singles ===
- "New Places, Old Faces" / "Misdemeanour Dream Felicity" (Song Records, 1969)
- "Saturday Morning Man" / "Mervyn Aldridge" (Song Records, 1969)
- "Sandie’s Gone (Part 1)" / "Sandie’s Gone (Part 2)" (CBS, April 1970)
- "Night Of The Warm Witch" / "Mr. De-Luxe" (CBS, April 1971)
- "Living One Day At A Time" / "Girl from Dublin City" (CBS, February 1972)

== Thin Lizzy ==
Moore played in Thin Lizzy (1973–74, 1977–79) for several periods and worked with Phil Lynott subsequently in his solo career.

=== Albums ===
- Nightlife (1974) (note that on the original album Moore appears only on the song "Still in Love with You", although the 2012 Deluxe includes both demo and BBC session tracks featuring Moore)
- Black Rose: A Rock Legend (1979)

=== Compilations ===
- Remembering – Part 1 (1976)
- The Continuing Saga of the Ageing Orphans (1979)
- The Adventures of Thin Lizzy (1981)
- Dedication: The Very Best of Thin Lizzy (1991)
- The Boys Are Back in Town (1997)
- Thin Lizzy Greatest Hits (2004)
- At the BBC (2011)

=== Live ===
- Life (1983) (2 tracks)

== Colosseum II ==
Colosseum II is a band that succeeded Colosseum and featured Don Airey, Neil Murray/John Mole, Mike Starrs, Jon Hiseman and Moore.

=== Albums ===
- Strange New Flesh (1976)
- Electric Savage (1977)
- War Dance (1977)
- Variations (1978) w/ Andrew Lloyd Webber

== Greg Lake ==
Moore participated in the recording of Greg Lake's two solo albums, Greg Lake (1981) and Manoeuvres (1983). He also played live in Greg Lake's line-up. Some notable performances of his touring stint with Lake, were the live covers of King Crimson songs "21st Century Schizoid Man", "In the Court of the Crimson King", as well as "Parisienne Walkways". One concert on this tour was recorded for the King Biscuit Flower Hour, and released on CD in 1995 as King Biscuit Flower Hour Presents Greg Lake in Concert.

Moore's 1983 album Dirty Fingers (which also featured ex-Ted Nugent vocalist Charlie Huhn, former Rainbow/Wild Horses and later Dio bassist Jimmy Bain, and ex-Black Oak Arkansas/Pat Travers and later Ozzy Osbourne/Whitesnake/Ted Nugent drummer Tommy Aldridge) had a song called "Nuclear Attack", which he also performed on the Greg Lake album.

=== Albums ===
- Greg Lake (1981)
- Manoeuvres (1983)
- King Biscuit Flower Hour Presents Greg Lake in Concert (1995)

== Early works, guest appearances & sessions ==
- 1970 Granny's Intention - Honest Injun (on "Maybe", "We Both Need To Know", "Good Eye", "Fifty Years On", "Susan of the Country", "Rise Then Fall", "With Salty Eyes", "Fourthskin Blues", and "Heavy Loaded Minds")
- 1970 Dr. Strangely Strange - Heavy Petting (on "Summer Breeze", "Sign On My Mind", "Gave My Love An Apple", and "Mary Malone of Moscow")
- 1973 Jonathan Kelly - Wait Till They Change The Backdrop (on "Turn Your Eye On Me", "Down On Me", "All In New Light", and "Hold On")
- 1975 Eddie Howell - The Eddie Howell Gramophone Record (acoustic guitar on "Miss Amerika"; credited as Garry Moore)
- 1975 Various - The Rock Peter and the Wolf (acoustic guitar on "Introduction"; slide guitar on "Grandfather"; electric guitar on "Peter's Theme", "Duck Theme", "Duck and Bird", "Cat and Duck", "Peter's Chase", "Rock and Roll Celebration", "Duck Escape", and "Final Theme")
- 1975 The Soul Searchers - "Scaramouche" b/w "Head Stand" 7" single
- 1978 Andrew Lloyd Webber - Variations
- 1978 Gary Boyle - Electric Glide (on "Hayabusa" and "Gaz")
- 1978 Rod Argent - Moving Home (acoustic guitar)
- 1979 Cozy Powell - Over the Top (on "Killer")
- 1980 Jack Lancaster - Skinningrove Bay (on "Kilten Castle"; credited as Garry Moore)
- 1981 Cozy Powell - Tilt (on "Sunset" and "The Blister")
- 1982 Johnny Duhan - Johnny Duhan (on "Ocean of Motion")
- 1983 Cozy Powell - Octopus (on "Dartmoore")
- 1983 Royal Philharmonic Orchestra & Friends - Arrested (on "Truth Hits Everybody", "Arrested", "Message In A Bottle", and "Invisible Sun")
- 1983 Chris Thompson - Out of the Night (on "Do What You Wanna Do")
- 1985 The Beach Boys - The Beach Boys (on "Maybe I Don't Know" and "She Believes in Love Again")
- 1986 Minako Honda - Cancel (on "Cancel")
- 1986 Minako Honda - Look over my shoulder (on "The Cross (Ai No Jujika)"; released by Gary as "Crying in the Shadows" on the CD version of Wild Frontier)
- 1986 Frankie Goes to Hollywood - "Warriors of the Wasteland" (Attack Mix)
- 1988 Don Airey - K2 (Tales Of Triumph And Tragedy) (on "Sea of Dreams Part 1" and "Song For Al")
- 1988 Mo Foster - Bel Assis (on "The Light in Your Eyes" and "Pump II")
- 1988 Keith Emerson - The Christmas Album (uncredited on "Captain Starship Christmas")
- 1989 Vicki Brown - Lady of Time (on "Just For You" and "If I Thought")
- 1990 Traveling Wilburys - Traveling Wilburys Vol. 3 (on "She's My Baby"; credited as Ken Wilbury)
- 1990 Vicki Brown - About Love and Time (on "We Are One")
- 1991 Mo Foster - Southern Reunion (on "Gil" and "A Notional Anthem")
- 1992 Jimmy Nail - Growing Up in Public (on "Absent Friends")
- 1993 Albert Collins - Collins Mix (The Best of) (on "If Trouble Was Money")
- 1993 Paul Rodgers - Muddy Water Blues: A Tribute to Muddy Waters (on "She Moves Me")
- 1994 Snowy White - Highway to the Sun (on "Keep On Working")
- 1994 Jack Bruce - Cities of the Heart (on "Life On Earth", "N.S.U.", "Sitting on Top of the World", "Politician", and "Spoonful")
- 1997 Jack Bruce - Sitting On Top of The World (The 50th Birthday Concert)
- 1997 Doctor Strangely Strange - Alternative Medicine: The Difficult Third Album (on "The Heat Came Down", "Whatever Happened To The Blues", and "Hard As Nails")
- 2001 John Mayall & Friends - Along For The Ride (on "If I Don't Get Home")
- 2001 Jim Capaldi - Living On The Outside (on "Heart of Stone")
- 2001 Jack Bruce - Shadows in the Air (on "Heart Quake" and "Dark Heart")
- 2002 Various - Various – From Clarksdale To Heaven - Remembering John Lee Hooker (on "I'm In The Mood" and "Serve Me Right to Suffer")
- 2004 Trilok Gurtu - Broken Rhythms (on "Kabir")
- 2004 Jim Capaldi - Poor Boy Blue
- 2006 Otis Taylor - Definition of a Circle (on "Little Betty", "Something In Your Back Pocket", and "Love and Hesitation")
- 2007 Various - Dear Mr Fantasy (Featuring the Music of Jim Capaldi & Traffic): A Celebration For Jim Capaldi (on "Evil Love" and "Love Will Keep Us Alive")

== Videos ==
- Thin Lizzy Live at Sydney Harbour '78 (1978)
- Emerald Aisles. Live in Ireland (1984)
- Live at Isstadion Stockholm: Wild Frontier Tour (1987)
- The Video Singles (1987)
- Live in Belfast: After the War Tour (1989)
- An Evening of the Blues with Gary Moore and the Midnight Blues Band – featuring Albert Collins and Albert King (1990)
- The Old Grey Whistle Test 2 (2003)
- Live at Monsters of Rock (2003)
- Gary Moore & The Midnight Blues Band – Live at Montreux 1990 (2004)
- Gary Moore and B.B. King (2006)
- Gary Moore and Friends: One Night in Dublin – A Tribute to Phil Lynott (2006)
- Gary Moore - The Definitive Montreux Collection (2007)
- Live at Montreux 2010 (2011)
- Blues for Jimi (2012)
- Gary Moore participated in a comedy skit entitled "The Easy Guitar Book Sketch", with comedian Rowland Rivron and fellow British musicians Mark Knopfler, Lemmy from Motorhead, Mark King from Level 42, and David Gilmour.
