= Live (Gary Moore album) =

Live album by Gary Moore
- Released: 21 September 1983
- Recorded: 5–6 November 1980
- Venues: The Marquee, London, England
- Genres: Hard rock, heavy metal
- Length: 50:58
- Label: Jet
- Producer: Chris Tsangarides

Gary Moore chronology
Dirty Fingers (1983)	Live (1983)	Victims of the Future (1984)

Singles from Live
- 1. "Parisienne Walkways" Released: September 1983 (Japan)

Alternative cover

Alternative cover
- 2000 Sanctuary reissue

Professional ratings
Review scores
Source	Rating
AllMusic	3/5 stars
Collector's Guide to Heavy Metal	6/10
Q Magazine	3/5 stars

Live is a live album by Gary Moore, recorded over two nights in 1980 at the Marquee Club in London. For the recording, Moore enlisted former Lone Star frontman, Kenny Driscoll to provide lead vocals (Driscoll's replacement in Lone Star, John Sloman, would later perform with Moore), Andy Pyle of The Kinks to play bass, former Black Oak Arkansas and Pat Travers drummer Tommy Aldridge, and Moore's former Colosseum II bandmate, keyboardist Don Airey, who would go on to contribute to many of Moore's later solo works.

The performance mainly showcases material from Moore's 1978 solo album Back on the Streets and his ill-fated G-Force project, with two songs being from Dirty Fingers, and the remaining track, "Dallas Warhead" being an original composition, which incorporates a drum solo from Aldridge.

This album was first released in Japan in 1983 along with the Dirty Fingers album by Sony Records who bought the copyright from Jet Records. There have been several subsequent releases under the title Live at the Marquee licensed by Jet Records. This version appeared on CD in 1990 via Castle Communications.

On 23 October 2000, Sanctuary Records released a remastered CD version, containing no additional material. Jeff Clark-Meads described it as capturing "every sweaty, heaving, raucous, ribald detail of [Moore's] gigs at the time".

== Track listing ==
All songs written by Gary Moore, with additional writers noted.

Side one

1. "Back on the Streets" – 5:29
2. "Run to Your Mama" – 5:19
3. "Dancin'" (Mark Nauseef, Tony Newton, Willie Dee) – 5:38
4. "She's Got You" (Nauseef) – 7:12

Side two

1. "Parisienne Walkways" (instrumental version) (Phil Lynott) – 7:45
2. "You" – 4:28
3. "Nuclear Attack" – 5:09
4. "Dallas Warhead" (instrumental) – 9:58

== Personnel ==
- Gary Moore – guitar, backing vocals
- Kenny Driscoll – lead vocals
- Don Airey – keyboards
- Andy Pyle – bass
- Tommy Aldridge – drums, percussion

Production

- Chris Tsangarides – producer, engineer
