= Essential Montreux =

Live album by Gary Moore
- Released: 16 June 2009
- Recorded: 7 July 1990 – 6 July 2001
- Genres: Hard rock, blues, blues rock
- Length: 366.27
- Label: Eagle Rock
- Producers: Claude Nobs - Montreux Sounds / Terry Shand and Geoff Kempin - Eagle Rock

Gary Moore chronology
Bad For You Baby (2008)	Essential Montreux (2009)	Live at Montreux 2010 (2011)

Professional ratings
Review scores
Source	Rating
AllMusic	4/5 stars

Essential Montreux is a special edition, five CD box-set, by Northern Irish, blues rock guitarist and singer, Gary Moore. The box-set features five out of the six performances Gary Moore made at the Montreux Jazz Festival. His live performances at Montreux that feature in this box-set are Live at Montreux 1990, 1995, 1997, 1999 and 2001.

There are in total, sixty songs between the 5 CDs with an approximate total playing time of six hours.

== Track listing ==
Disc 1: Live at Montreux 1990
No.	Title	Writer(s)	Length
1.	"All Your Love (I Miss Loving)"	Otis Rush	4:05
2.	"Midnight Blues"	Moore	6:27
3.	"You Don't Love Me"	Willie Cobbs	3:49
4.	"Texas Strut"	Moore	12:59
5.	"Moving On"	Moore	2:54
6.	"Too Tired"	Johnny "Guitar" Watson, Davies, Bihari	3:49
7.	"Cold Cold Feeling"	Jessie Mae Robinson	8:16
8.	"Farther Up the Road"	Don Robey, Joe Medwick Veasey	5:27
9.	"King of the Blues"	Moore	6:27
10.	"Stop Messin' Around"	Peter Green, C.G. Adams	4:32
11.	"The Blues Is Alright"	Little Milton Campbell	7:18
12.	"The Messiah Will Come Again"	Roy Buchanan	10:34

Recorded at the Montreux Jazz Festival, 7 July 1990

Disc 2: Live at Montreux 1995
No.	Title	Writer(s)	Length
1.	"If You Be My Baby"	Adam, Green	5:53
2.	"Long Grey Mare"	Green	3:14
3.	"Oh Pretty Woman"	A.C. Williams	5:05
4.	"I Loved Another Woman"	Green	6:18
5.	"Merry-Go-Round"	Green	5:38
6.	"The Stumble"	Freddie King, Sonny Thompson	3:20
7.	"Need Your Love So Bad"	Mertis John Jr, Little Willie John	8:07
8.	"You Don't Love Me"	Cobbs	5:13
9.	"Key to Love"	Mayall	2:22
10.	"All Your Love (I Miss Loving)"	Rush	4:16
11.	"Since I Met You Baby"	Moore	3:27
12.	"The Blues Is Alright"	Campbell	8:55
13.	"Stop Messin' Around"	Adams, Green	6:20
14.	"Jumping at Shadows"	Duster Bennett	4:37

Recorded at the Montreux Jazz Festival, 16 July 1995

Disc 3: Live at Montreux 1997
No.	Title	Writer(s)	Length
1.	"One Good Reason"	Moore	3:09
2.	"One Fine Day"	Moore	4:18
3.	"Cold Wind Blows"	Moore	6:40
4.	"I've Found My Love in You"	Moore	8:25
5.	"Always There for You"	Moore	6:15
6.	"Oh Pretty Woman"	A.C. Williams	4:38
7.	"Walking by Myself"	Jimmy Rogers	4:16
8.	"Business as Usual"	Moore	13:18
9.	"Out in the Fields"	Moore/Lynott	7:50
10.	"Over the Hills and Far Away"	Moore	6:21
11.	"Parisienne Walkways"	Moore/Lynott	11:14

Recorded at the Montreux Jazz Festival, 9 July 1997

Disc 4: Live at Montreux 1999
No.	Title	Writer(s)	Length
1.	"Walking by Myself"	Rogers	4:14
2.	"Since I Meet You Baby"	Moore	3:38
3.	"Need Your Love So Bad"	John, John	7:22
4.	"Tore Down"	Thompson	4:00
5.	"You Don't Love Me"	Cobbs	4:43
6.	"All Your Love (I Miss Loving)"	Rush	4:32
7.	"Still Got the Blues (For You)"	Moore	6:35
8.	"Too Tired"	Watson, Davies, Bihari	4:24
9.	"The Sky Is Crying"	Elmore James	11:34
10.	"Farther Up the Road"	Robey, Veasey	6:21
11.	"Fire"	Jimi Hendrix	3:09
12.	"Parisienne Walkways"	Moore/Lynott	11:31

Recorded at the Montreux Jazz Festival, 7 July 1999

Disc 5: Live at Montreux 2001
No.	Title	Writer(s)	Length
1.	"You Upset Me Baby"	B.B. King, Bhari	3:21
2.	"Cold Black Night"	Moore	4:19
3.	"Stormy Monday"	T-Bone Walker	7:14
4.	"Oh Pretty Woman"	A.C. Williams	4:41
5.	"All Your Love (I Miss Loving)"	Rush	5:14
6.	"Still Got the Blues (For You)"	Moore	7:16
7.	"Too Tired"	Watson, Davies, Bihari	9:51
8.	"How Many Lies"	Moore	7:27
9.	"Fire"	Hendrix	3:56
10.	"Enough of the Blues"	Moore	8:05
11.	"The Prophet"	Moore	7:14

Recorded at the Montreux Jazz Festival, 6 July 2001

== Personnel ==
Live at Montreux 1990

- Gary Moore - Lead vocals, lead and rhythm guitar
- Don Airey - Keyboards
- Andy Pyle - Bass guitar
- Graham Walker - Drums
- Frank Mead - Alto saxophone, harmonica
- Nick Pentelow - Tenor saxophone
- Nick Payn - Baritone saxophone
- Martin Drover - Trumpet
- Albert Collins (Special guest) Tracks 6, 7, 8, 9 & 11

Live at Montreux 1995

- Gary Moore - Lead vocals, lead and rhythm guitar
- Tommy Eyre - Keyboards
- Nick Payn - Baritone saxophone
- Nick Pentelow - Tenor saxophone
- Andy Pyle - Bass guitar
- Graham Walker - Drums

Live at Montreux 1997

- Gary Moore - Lead vocals, lead and rhythm guitar
- Magnus Fiennes - Keyboards
- Guy Pratt - Bass guitar, backing vocals
- Gary Husband - Drums

Live at Montreux 1999

- Gary Moore - Lead vocals, lead and rhythm guitar
- Vic Martin - Keyboards
- Pete Rees - Bass guitar
- Gary Husband - Drums

Live at Montreux 2001

- Gary Moore - Lead vocals, lead and rhythm guitar
- Vic Martin - Keyboards
- Pete Rees - Bass guitar
- Darrin Mooney - Drums
