= Out in the Fields – The Very Best of Gary Moore =

Out in the Fields: The Very Best of Gary Moore

Greatest hits album by Gary Moore
- Released: 19 October 1998
- Recorded: 1982–1992
- Genres: Blues-rock, hard rock
- Length: 70:48
- Label: Virgin
- Producer: Gary Moore

Gary Moore chronology
Dark Days in Paradise (1997)	Out in the Fields: The Very Best of Gary Moore (1998)	Blood of Emeralds (1999)

Alternative covers
- Swedish Release Cover

Professional ratings
Review scores
Source	Rating
Allmusic	4.5/5 stars

Out in the Fields: The Very Best of Gary Moore is a compilation album by Gary Moore. Released in 1998, the album encompasses a part of Moore's immense career from 1982 to 1992, focusing predominantly on the hard rock albums Moore released during that period. As well as the regular 1-disc version, a 2-CD limited edition was also released; the second disc contains several live and studio B-sides, a non-album single and a single remix.

== Track listing ==
All tracks are written by Gary Moore, except where noted.

Disc one
No.	Title	Writer(s)	Length
1.	"Out in the Fields" (from Run for Cover, 1985)		4:15
2.	"Over the Hills and Far Away" (from Wild Frontier, 1987)		5:20
3.	"Run for Cover" (from Run for Cover, 1985)		4:11
4.	"Parisienne Walkways" (live edit; B-side to "Empty Rooms" single, 1985)	Moore, Phil Lynott	5:48
5.	"Empty Rooms" (from Run for Cover, 1985)	Moore, Neil Carter	4:15
6.	"The Loner" (instrumental; from Wild Frontier, 1987)	Max Middleton, Moore	5:54
7.	"Military Man" (from Run for Cover, 1985)	Lynott	5:36
8.	"After the War" (single version, from After the War, 1989)		4:05
9.	"Cold Day in Hell" (from After Hours, 1992)		4:24
10.	"Wild Frontier" (from Wild Frontier, 1987)		4:13
11.	"Still in Love with You" (B-side to "Out in the Fields" single, 1985)	Lynott	5:55
12.	"Wishing Well" (from Corridors of Power, 1982)	John Bundrick, Paul Kossoff, Paul Rodgers, Simon Kirke, Tetsu Yamauchi	4:04
13.	"Friday on My Mind" (single remix, from Wild Frontier, 1987)	George Young, Harry Vanda	4:14
14.	"Still Got the Blues (For You)" (single version, from Still Got the Blues, 1990)		4:12
15.	"Ready for Love" (single version, from After the War, 1989)		4:25

Disc two
No.	Title	Writer(s)	Length
1.	"Stop Messin' Around" (live; B-side to "Out in the Fields" single, 1985)	Peter Green, Clifford Davis	4:08
2.	"Out in the Fields" (live; B-side to "Over the Hills and Far Away" single, 1987)		5:31
3.	"Reach for the Sky" (live; B-side to "Friday on My Mind" single, 1987)		5:10
4.	"The Loner" (live; non-album single, 1987)	Middleton, Moore	12:28
5.	"All Messed Up" (live; B-side to "Take a Little Time" single, 1987)	Moore, Carter	6:16
6.	"Thunder Rising" (live; B-side to "Take a Little Time" single, 1987)	Moore, Carter	5:46
7.	"Over the Hills and Far Away" (live; B-side to "After the War" single, 1989)		6:58
8.	"Military Man" (live; B-side to "Ready for Love" single, 1989)	Lynott	6:24
9.	"Devil in Her Heart" (B-side to "Hold on to Love" single, 1983)		3:24
10.	"Emerald" (B-side to "After the War" single, 1989)	Lynott, Brian Robertson, Brian Downey, Scott Gorham	4:04
11.	"Livin' on Dreams" (single remix, from After the War, 1989)		4:03

== Charts ==
1998 chart performance
Chart (1998)	Peak position
Norwegian Albums (VG-lista)	10
Scottish Albums (Official Charts)	95
Swedish Albums (Sverigetopplistan)	13
UK Albums (Official Charts)	54
UK Rock & Metal Albums (Official Charts)	3

2011 chart performance
Chart (2011)	Peak position
UK Jazz & Blues Albums (Official Charts)	5

== Certifications ==
Certifications
Region	Certification	Certified units/sales
Sweden (GLF)	Gold	40,000^{^}
United Kingdom (BPI)	Gold	100,000^{‡}
^{^} Shipments figures based on certification alone.^{‡} Sales+streaming figures based on certification alone.
