= Live at Monsters of Rock =

2003 live album by Gary Moore

Live album by Gary Moore
- Released: 30 September 2003
- Recorded: 22 May 2003
- Genre: Hard rock, heavy metal, blues-rock
- Length: 61:42
- Label: Sanctuary Records
- Producer: Chris Tsangarides & Gary Moore

Gary Moore chronology
Parisienne Walkways: The Blues Collection (2003)	Live at Monsters of Rock (2003)	Power of the Blues (2004)

Professional ratings
Review scores
Source	Rating
Allmusic	4/5 stars

Live at Monsters of Rock

Video by Gary Moore
- Released: October 21, 2003
- Recorded: May 21, 2003
- Genre: Hard rock, heavy metal, blues-rock
- Length: 63:00 (approximately)
- Label: Sanctuary Visual Entertainment
- Producer: Chris Tsangarides; Gary Moore

Gary Moore chronology
The Old Grey Whistle Test 2 (2003)	Live at Monsters of Rock (2003)	Gary Moore & The Midnight Blues Band – Live at Montreux 1990 (2004)

Professional ratings
Review scores
Source	Rating
Allmusic	3/5 stars

Live at Monsters of Rock is a live album and DVD Northern Irish blues guitarist and singer Gary Moore. It was recorded live on May 21, 2003 at Sheffield Hallam Arena in England, during Gary Moore's appearance on the 2003 Monsters of Rock tour. Despite being credited solely to Moore, the album actually represents a performance by Moore's short-lived Scars project, featuring Cass Lewis and Darrin Mooney on bass and drums, respectively. The band plays several tracks from their only studio album, released the previous year, as well as songs from Moore's extensive back catalogue.

The DVD, released in 2003 by Sanctuary Visual Entertainment, contains no overdubs and includes a bonus sound check and bonus interview footage of Gary Moore.

== Performances ==
Live at Monsters of Rock
No.	Title	Writer(s)	Length
1.	"Shapes of Things"	Smith, Relf, McCarty	5:00
2.	"Wishing Well"	Rodgers, Kirk, Kosoff, Tetsu	4:33
3.	"Rectify"	Moore, Lewis, Mooney	5:09
4.	"Guitar Intro"	Moore	2:16
5.	"Stand Up"	Moore, Lewis, Mooney	6:08
6.	"Just Can't Let You Go"	Moore	9:22
7.	"Walking by Myself"	Rodgers	4:52
8.	"Don't Believe a Word"	Lynott	7:15
9.	"Out in the Fields"	Moore	8:50
10.	"Parisienne Walkways"	Moore, Lynott	9:22

== Personnel ==
- Gary Moore - lead vocals, guitar, mixing, producer
- Cass Lewis - bass guitar, backing vocals
- Darrin Mooney - drums
- Chris Tsangarides - engineer, mixing, producer
- Will Shapland - engineer
- Ian Cooper - mastering
