= Gary Moore – The Definitive Montreux Collection =

2007 live DVD by Gary Moore

Gary Moore - The Definitive Montreux Collection

Video by Gary Moore
- Released: 16 October 2007
- Recorded: 7 July 1990 – 6 July 2001
- Genres: Hard rock, blues, blues rock
- Length: 258
- Label: Eagle Rock Entertainment
- Producers: Claude Nobs - Montreux Sounds / Terry Shand and Geoff Kempin - Eagle Rock

Gary Moore video chronology
One Night in Dublin: A Tribute to Phil Lynott (2006)	Gary Moore - The Definitive Montreux Collection (2007)	Live at Montreux 2010 (2011)

Gary Moore – The Definitive Montreux Collection is a two-DVD compilation from five performances by Gary Moore at the Montreux Jazz Festival between 1990 and 2001. The first DVD features Gary's live shows at Montreux from 1990 and 1995, while the second DVD features his performances at Montreux from 1997, 1999 and 2001.

In 2010, Eagle Rock Entertainment re-released the collection with a bonus CD, which features a small collection of the songs from the Live at Montreux performances, featured on the DVD.

== Reception ==
A 2010 review in O Globo said that "despite not having any ultra-sophisticated production (neither the show, nor the filming)", Gary Moore – The Definitive Montreux Collection was a study in contrasts: "from the most taciturn blues...to incendiary rock...always accompanied by excellent musicians".

Writing in Guitar Player magazine in 2010, editor Matt Blackett ranked The Definitive Montreux Collection as one of his "Top 3 DVD Picks". He wrote, "Moore rules...His bends, vibrato, and attack are all Hall of Fame caliber", adding that "it's interesting how his tone doesn't change that much" over the years, regardless of which brand of guitars Moore was playing.

== Performances ==
Disc One: Live at Montreux 1990 and 1995
No.	Title	Writer(s)	Length
1.	"Midnight Blues"	Moore	6:27
2.	"Texas Strut"	Moore	12:59
3.	"Moving On"	Moore	2:54
4.	"Cold Cold Feeling"	Jessie Mae Robinson	8:16
5.	"Stop Messin' Around"	Adams, Green	4:32
6.	"The Blues Is Alright"	Campbell	7:18
7.	"The Messiah Will Come Again"	Roy Buchanan	10:34
8.	"If You Be My Baby"	Adams, Green	5:53
9.	"Long Grey Mare"	Green	3:14
10.	"Merry-Go-Round"	Green	5:38
11.	"The Stumble"	King, Thompson	3:20
12.	"You Don't Love Me"	Willie Cobbs	5:13
13.	"Key to Love"	Mayall	2:22
14.	"All Your Love"	Otis Rush	4:16
15.	"Still Got the Blues"	Moore	7:40
16.	"Since I Meet You Baby"	Moore	3:27
17.	"The Sky Is Crying"	Elmore James	11:47
18.	"Jumping at Shadows"	Bennett	4:37

- Tracks 1 - 7: Recorded at the Montreux Jazz Festival, 7 July 1990
- Tracks 8 - 18: Recorded at the Montreux Jazz Festival, 16 July 1995

Disc Two: Live at Montreux 1997, 1999 and 2001
No.	Title	Writer(s)	Length
1.	"One Fine Day"	Moore	4:18
2.	"Cold Wind Blows"	Moore	6:40
3.	"I've Found My Love In You"	Moore	8:25
4.	"Always There For You"	Moore	6:15
5.	"Business as Usual"	Moore	13:18
6.	"Out In the Fields"	Moore/Lynott	7:30
7.	"Oh Pretty Woman"	A C Williams	4:39
8.	"Need Your Love So Bad"	Mertis John Jr	7:22
9.	"Tore Down"	Thompson	4:00
10.	"I Loved Another Woman"	Green	4:32
11.	"Too Tired"	Watson/Davies/Bihari	4:24
12.	"Further on Up the Road"	Don Robey, Joe Veasey	6:21
13.	"Parisienne Walkways"	Moore/Lynott	11:31
14.	"You Upset Me Baby"	Bhari, King	3:21
15.	"Cold Black Night"	Moore	4:19
16.	"Stormy Monday"	T Bone Walker	7:14
17.	"Walking by Myself"	Rogers	5:12
18.	"How Many Lies"	Moore	7:27
19.	"Fire"	Hendrix	3:56
20.	"Enough of the Blues"	Moore	8:05
21.	"The Prophet"	Moore	7:14

- Tracks 1 - 6: Recorded at the Montreux Jazz Festival, 9 July 1997
- Tracks 7 - 13: Recorded at the Montreux Jazz Festival, 7 July 1999
- Tracks 14 - 21: Recorded at the Montreux Jazz Festival, 6 July 2001

Bonus CD (2010 Release)
No.	Title	Writer(s)	Length
1.	"Midnight Blues"	Moore	6:27
2.	"Moving On"	Moore	2:54
3.	"All Your Love"	Rush	4:16
4.	"Still Got the Blues"	Moore
5.	"Out In the Fields"	Moore/Lynott	7:30
6.	"Over the Hills and Far Away"	Moore	6:21
7.	"Oh Pretty Woman"	A C Williams	4:39
8.	"Too Tired"	Watson/Davies/Bihari	4:24
9.	"Parisienne Walkways"	Moore/Lynott	11:31
10.	"Stormy Monday"	T-Bone Walker	7:14
11.	"Walking by Myself"	Rogers	5:21

== Personnel ==
Live at Montreux 1990

- Gary Moore - Lead vocals, lead and rhythm guitar
- Don Airey - Keyboards
- Andy Pyle - Bass guitar
- Graham Walker - Drums
- Frank Mead - Alto saxophone, harmonica
- Nick Pentelow - Tenor saxophone
- Nick Payn - Baritone saxophone
- Martin Drover - Trumpet
- Albert Collins (Special guest) Tracks 4 and 6

Live at Montreux 1995

- Gary Moore - Lead vocals, lead and rhythm guitar
- Tommy Eyre - Keyboards
- Nick Payn - Baritone saxophone
- Nick Pentelow - Tenor saxophone
- Andy Pyle - Bass guitar
- Graham Walker - Drums

Live at Montreux 1997

- Gary Moore - Lead vocals, lead and rhythm guitar
- Magnus Fiennes - Keyboards
- Guy Pratt - Bass guitar, backing vocals
- Gary Husband - Drums

Live at Montreux 1999

- Gary Moore - Lead vocals, lead and rhythm guitar
- Vic Martin - Keyboards
- Pete Rees - Bass guitar
- Gary Husband - Drums

Live at Montreux 2001

- Gary Moore - Lead vocals, lead and rhythm guitar
- Vic Martin - Keyboards
- Pete Rees - Bass guitar
- Darrin Mooney - Drums
