= The Platinum Collection (Gary Moore album) =

The Platinum Collection (Gary Moore Album)

Compilation album by Gary Moore
- Released: 4 September 2006
- Genres: Blues rock, hard rock
- Label: EMI International
- Producer: Gary Moore

Gary Moore chronology
Old New Ballads Blues (2006)	The Platinum Collection (Gary Moore Album) (2006)	Close As You Get (2007)

The Platinum Collection is a 2006 compilation album by Gary Moore. There are three CDs each covering a different category: Rock, Blues and Live.

Professional ratings
Review scores
Source	Rating
Allmusic	4.5/5 stars

== Track listing ==
=== Disc 1 (Rock) ===
1. "Parisienne Walkways"
2. "Out in the Fields"
3. "Over the Hills and Far Away"
4. "Empty Rooms ('84 Remix)"
5. "Friday on My Mind"
6. "After the War"
7. "Wild Frontier"
8. "The Loner"
9. "Shapes of Things"
10. "Wishing Well"
11. "Don't Take Me for a Loser"
12. "Hold on to Love"
13. "Blood of Emeralds"
14. "Take a Little Time"
15. "Like Angels"
16. "One Good Reason"
17. "Johnny Boy"

=== Disc 2 (Blues) ===
1. "Still Got the Blues (For You)"
2. "Cold Day in Hell"
3. "Oh Pretty Woman"
4. "Story of the Blues"
5. "Separate Ways"
6. "Since I Met You Baby"
7. "I Loved Another Woman"
8. "Woke Up This Morning"
9. "Further on Up the Road"
10. "The Sky Is Crying"
11. "Left Me with the Blues"
12. "Mean Cruel Woman"
13. "The Blues Is Alright"
14. "If You Be My Baby"
15. "Need Your Love So Bad"

=== Disc 3 (Live) ===
1. "Murder in the Skies" (Live)
2. "Military Man" (Live)
3. "White Knuckles" (Live)
4. "Empty Rooms" (Live)
5. "Out in the Fields" (Live)
6. "Back on the Streets" (Live)
7. "Stop Messin' Around" (Live)
8. "Cold Day in Hell" (Live)
9. "Midnight Blues" (Live)
10. "King of the Blues" (Live)
11. "Caldonia" (Live)
12. "Cold, Cold Feeling" (Live)
13. "Parisienne Walkways" (Live)

== Personnel ==
- Gary Moore - guitar, vocals
- Bob Daisley - bass guitar
- Darrin Mooney - drums
- Jim Watson - keyboards
- Phil Lynott - bass guitar, vocals
- Neil Carter - keyboard
- Albert King - guitar

== Charts ==
Chart performance for The Platinum Collection
Chart (2025)	Peak position
Greek Albums (IFPI)	2
