= Power of the Blues =

Studio album by Gary Moore
- Released: 22 June 2004
- Genres: Blues rock, hard rock
- Length: 41:21
- Label: Sanctuary
- Producers: Chris Tsangarides, Gary Moore

Gary Moore chronology
Live at Monsters of Rock (2003)	Power of the Blues (2004)	Old New Ballads Blues (2006)

Power of the Blues is the fourteenth solo album by Northern Irish blues guitarist and singer Gary Moore, released in 2004. It followed the short-lived power trio Scars; like Scars and Back to the Blues, it was co-produced by Chris Tsangarides and featured Darrin Mooney on drums. Rounding out the line-up was Bob Daisley, who hadn't played on a Gary Moore album since 1992's After Hours.

Three songs were covers, two of them written by Willie Dixon: "I Can't Quit You Baby" was first recorded by Otis Rush and "Evil" by Howlin' Wolf. "Memory Pain" by Percy Mayfield had been played live by The Gary Moore Band in 1972-1973 and later became part of Thin Lizzy's repertoire (albeit after Moore's tenure with the band).

The rest of Power of the Blues was made up of original songs, some of which were jointly written by all three musicians. All tracks from this album were re-released on the multi-disc compilation, "Blues and Beyond" in 2017, and the album in its original order was included on the 2023 box set The Sanctuary Years 1999-2004.

In 2018, Bob Daisley re-recorded "Torn Inside" for his tribute album Moore Blues for Gary, vocals were handled by Gary's former Skid Row bandmate Brush Shiels.

Professional ratings
Review scores
Source	Rating
Allmusic	3.5/5 stars

== Track listing ==
Power of the Blues
No.	Title	Writer(s)	Length
1.	"Power of the Blues"	Moore, Daisley, Mooney	2:30
2.	"There's a Hole"	Moore	5:38
3.	"Tell Me Woman"	Moore	2:53
4.	"I Can't Quit You Baby"	Willie Dixon	5:48
5.	"That's Why I Play the Blues"	Moore	4:05
6.	"Evil"	Willie Dixon	2:42
7.	"Getaway Blues"	Moore, Daisley, Mooney	3:42
8.	"Memory Pain"	Percy Mayfield	4:52
9.	"Can't Find My Baby"	Moore	3:34
10.	"Torn Inside"	Moore	5:37

== Personnel ==
- Gary Moore - vocals, guitar
- Bob Daisley - bass
- Jim Watson - keyboards on "There's a Hole", "That's Why I Play the Blues" and "Can't Find My Baby"
- Darrin Mooney - drums
