= Blues for Jimi =

Live album by Gary Moore
- Released: 24 September 2012
- Recorded: 25 October 2007
- Genres: Psychedelic rock, blues rock
- Length: 73:38
- Label: Eagle Records
- Producers: Terry Shand and Geoff Kempin - Eagle Rock

Gary Moore chronology
Live at Montreux 2010 (2011)	Blues for Jimi (2012)

Blues for Jimi

Video by Gary Moore
- Released: 24 September 2012
- Recorded: 25 October 2007
- Genres: Psychedelic rock, blues rock
- Length: 73:38 (approximately)
- Label: Eagle Vision
- Producers: Terry Shand and Geoff Kempin - Eagle Rock

Gary Moore chronology
Live at Montreux 2010 (2011)	Blues for Jimi (2012)

Blues for Jimi is a live album and video by the Northern Irish blues rock guitarist and singer, Gary Moore. The live performance was originally recorded on 25 October 2007 at the London Hippodrome.

The performance features Gary Moore playing a selection of Jimi Hendrix classics. The concert was part of the launch for the Jimi Hendrix Live at Monterey album. It features a special guest appearance by Billy Cox and Mitch Mitchell

== Track listing ==
Blues for Jimi - CD, Blu-ray/DVD
No.	Title	Writer(s)	Length
1.	"Purple Haze"	Jimi Hendrix	4:15
2.	"Manic Depression"	Hendrix	3:48
3.	"Foxy Lady"	Hendrix	6:14
4.	"The Wind Cries Mary"	Hendrix	4:19
5.	"I Don't Live Today"	Hendrix	5:58
6.	"My Angel"	Gary Moore	0:53
7.	"Angel"	Hendrix	5:16
8.	"Fire"	Hendrix	5:38
9.	"Red House"	Hendrix	11:30
10.	"Stone Free"	Hendrix	5:45
11.	"Hey Joe"	Billy Roberts	9:36
12.	"Voodoo Child (Slight Return)"	Hendrix	10:11

== Personnel ==
- Gary Moore - Lead Vocals, lead and rhythm guitar
- Dave Bronze - Bass guitar (Tracks 1–8, 12)
- Darrin Mooney - Drums (Tracks 1–8, 12)

Special Guests

- Billy Cox - Bass guitar and vocals (Tracks 9–11)
- Mitch Mitchell - Drums (Tracks 9–11)
