= Rockin' Every Night – Live in Japan =

Rockin' Every Night - Live in Japan

Live album by Gary Moore
- Released: 21 May 1983 (Japan); 1986 (Europe)
- Recorded: 24–25 January 1983
- Venues: Shinjuku Kousei Nenkin Hall, Tokyo, Japan
- Genres: Hard rock, heavy metal
- Length: 43:35
- Label: Virgin
- Producers: Gary Moore and Nigel Walker

Gary Moore chronology
Corridors of Power (1982)	Rockin' Every Night - Live in Japan (1983)	Dirty Fingers (1983)

Professional ratings
Review scores
Source	Rating
AllMusic	2/5 stars
Kerrang!	4/5 stars

Rockin' Every Night – Live in Japan is a live album recorded by Gary Moore at Tokyo Kōsei Nenkin Kaikan in 1983, during the Corridors of Power tour. Despite being released in Japan in 1983, it was not given a European release until 1986. The 2002 CD reissue included three live tracks recorded at the Marquee in London on 26 August 1982, originally from a bonus EP included with the first 25,000 vinyl copies of Moore's earlier album Corridors of Power.

The song "Sunset", which had been a staple of Moore's live setlist since 1980, is dedicated to the late Randy Rhoads, who had died several months prior. It was finally recorded in the studio in 1982, for Cozy Powell's Tilt album. Keyboardist Don Airey had previously recorded and performed with Rhoads in Ozzy Osbourne's backing band during the Diary of a Madman tour.

== Track listing ==
All tracks are written by Gary Moore, except where indicated.

Side one
No.	Title	Writer(s)	Lead vocals	Length
1.	"Rockin' Every Night"	Moore, Ian Paice	John Sloman	3:18
2.	"Wishing Well" (Free cover)	Paul Rodgers, Simon Kirke, Tetsu Yamauchi, John Bundrick, Paul Kossoff	Moore	4:54
3.	"I Can't Wait Until Tomorrow"		Moore, Sloman	12:04

Side two
No.	Title	Lead vocals	Length
4.	"Nuclear Attack"	Sloman	5:58
5.	"White Knuckles" (instrumental)		3:48
6.	"Rockin' and Rollin'"	Sloman	4:05
7.	"Back on the Streets"	Moore	5:13
8.	"Sunset" (instrumental)		4:35

2002 CD reissue bonus tracks
No.	Title	Writer(s)	Lead vocals	Length
9.	"Back on the Streets"		Charlie Huhn	5:09
10.	"Rockin' Every Night"	Moore, Paice	Huhn	2:55
11.	"Parisienne Walkways"	Moore, Phil Lynott	Moore	5:49
Total length:				56:38

== Personnel ==
Musicians

- Gary Moore – guitars, lead vocals on tracks 2, 3 and 7, backing vocals
- John Sloman – lead vocals on tracks 1, 3, 4 and 6, backing vocals, keyboards
- Don Airey – keyboards
- Neil Murray – bass
- Ian Paice – drums, percussion

Production

- Nigel Walker – producer, engineer

== Charts ==
Year	Chart	Position
1984	Australian Albums Chart	91
1986	Finnish Albums Chart	37
