= The Best of the Blues (Gary Moore album) =

Compilation album by Gary Moore
- Released: 19 February 2002
- Genre: Blues rock
- Length: 146:35
- Label: Virgin

Gary Moore chronology
Back to the Blues (2001)	The Best of the Blues (2002)	Scars (2002)

Professional ratings
Review scores
Source	Rating
AllMusic	4/5 stars
The Penguin Guide to Blues Recordings	3/4 stars

The Best of the Blues is a 2002 two-CD compilation album by Gary Moore. The first disc contains songs from his 1990s blues albums After Hours, Blues Alive, Blues for Greeny and, most prominently, Still Got the Blues. The second disc is entirely live. Both discs feature blues veterans Albert King, B. B. King and Albert Collins as guest artists.

== Track listing ==
All songwriting by Gary Moore, except where noted, plus original album release and/or date.

=== CD 1 (Studio) ===
1. "Walking By Myself" (Jimmy Rogers) – 2:55 (Still Got the Blues 1990)
2. "Oh, Pretty Woman" (A.C. Williams), feat. Albert King – 4:24 (Still Got the Blues)
3. "Still Got the Blues" (Full version) – 6:10 (Still Got the Blues)
4. "Separate Ways" – 4:54 (After Hours 1992)
5. "Since I Met You Baby" feat. B.B. King – 2:51 (After Hours)
6. "Story of the Blues" (Single edit) – 4:34 (After Hours)
7. "All Your Love" (Otis Rush) – 3:40 (Still Got the Blues)
8. "Too Tired" (Saul Bihari, Maxwell Davis, Johnny "Guitar" Watson), feat. Albert Collins – 2:50 (Still Got the Blues)
9. "Need Your Love So Bad" (Single edit) (Little Willie John, Mertis John Jr.) – 4:06 (Blues for Greeny 1995)
10. "Midnight Blues" – 4:58 (Still Got the Blues)
11. "King of the Blues" – 4:34 (Still Got the Blues)
12. "Jumpin' at Shadows" (Duster Bennett) – 4:20 (After Hours)
13. "Texas Strut" – 4:49 (Still Got the Blues)
14. "Moving On" – 2:38 (Still Got the Blues)
15. "Stop Messin' Around" (Peter Green) – 3:52 (Still Got the Blues)
16. "Parisienne Walkways '93" (Phil Lynott, Moore) – 5:02
17. "The Supernatural" (Green) – 3:00 (Blues for Greeny)

=== CD 2 (Live) ===
1. "Caldonia", feat. Albert Collins & Albert King – 5:35 (1992)
2. "You Don't Love Me (No No No)" (Carlin, Dawn Penn, U-Roy) – 4:17 (1993)
3. "Key to Love" (John Mayall) – 2:20 (1993)
4. "The Thrill Is Gone" (Rick Darnell, Roy Hawkins), feat. B.B. King – 8:43 (1993)
5. "Stormy Monday" (T-Bone Walker), feat. Albert King – 10:17 (1992)
6. "Cold, Cold Feeling" (Jessie Mae Robinson), feat. Albert Collins – 7:18 (1990)
7. "Further Up the Road" (Don Robey, Joe Medwick Veasey), feat. Albert Collins – 5:49 (1992)
8. "The Stumble" (Freddie King, Sonny Thompson) – 3:00 (1992)
9. "Oh, Pretty Woman" (Williams) – 4:07 (1990)
10. "Walking By Myself" (Rogers) – 4:10 (1990)
11. "Too Tired" (Bihari, Davis, Watson) – 3:40 (1990)
12. "Still Got the Blues (For You)" – 6:50 (1990)
13. "All Your Love" (Rush) – 3:54 (1990)
14. "Midnight Blues" – 6:58 (1992)
