= Live at Montreux 2010 =

Live album and video by Gary Moore

Live album by Gary Moore
- Released: 19 September 2011
- Recorded: 6 July 2010
- Genre: Hard rock, blues rock, heavy metal
- Length: 79:43
- Label: Eagle Vision
- Producer: Claude Nobs - Montreux Sounds / Terry Shand and Geoff Kempin - Eagle Rock

Gary Moore chronology
Essential Montreux (2009)	Live at Montreux 2010 (2011)	Blues for Jimi (2012)

Live at Montreux

Video by Gary Moore
- Released: 19 September 2011
- Recorded: 6 July 2010
- Genre: Hard rock, blues rock
- Length: 119:00 (approximately)
- Label: Eagle Vision
- Producer: Claude Nobs - Montreux Sounds / Terry Shand and Geoff Kempin - Eagle Rock

Gary Moore chronology
Gary Moore - The Definitive Montreux Collection (2007)	Live at Montreux (2011)	Blues for Jimi (2012)

Live at Montreux 2010 is a live album and Blu-ray/DVD by the Northern Irish, blues rock guitarist and singer, Gary Moore. It was recorded at the Montreux Jazz Festival on 6 July 2010, and released on 19 September 2011. This would prove to be Gary Moore's last filmed performance before his death on 6 February 2011.

The live performance draws mainly from the Wild Frontier album and era, as well as featuring three new songs which were planned to feature on a new Celtic-rock album, although this project never materialised due to his death on 6 February 2011.

== Track listing ==
Live at Montreux 2010 - CD
No.	Title	Writer(s)	Length
1.	"Over the Hills and Far Away"	Moore	7:10
2.	"Military Man"	Lynott	6:00
3.	"Days of Heroes"	Moore	3:59
4.	"Where Are You Now?"	Moore	6:45
5.	"So Far Away / Empty Rooms"	Moore/Carter	11:48
6.	"Oh Wild One"	Moore	6:40
7.	"Blood of Emeralds"	Moore/Carter	8:23
8.	"Out in the Fields"	Moore/Lynott	7:43
9.	"Walking by Myself"	Rogers	5:06
10.	"Johnny Boy"	Moore	3:12
11.	"Parisienne Walkways"	Moore/Lynott	10:52

== Performances ==
Live at Montreux 2010 - Blu-ray/DVD
No.	Title	Writer(s)	Length
1.	"Over the Hills and Far Away"	Moore	7:10
2.	"Thunder Rising"	Moore/Carter
3.	"Military Man"	Lynott	6:00
4.	"Days of Heroes"	Moore	3:59
5.	"Where Are You Now?"	Moore	6:45
6.	"So Far Away / Empty Rooms"	Moore/Carter	11:48
7.	"Oh Wild One"	Moore	6:40
8.	"Blood of Emeralds"	Moore/Carter	8:23
9.	"Out in the Fields"	Moore/Lynott	7:43
10.	"Still Got the Blues"	Moore
11.	"Walking by Myself"	Rogers	5:06
12.	"Johnny Boy"	Moore	3:12
13.	"Parisienne Walkways"	Moore/Lynott	10:52

Bonus Tracks

Live at Montreux 1997
No.	Title	Writer(s)	Length
14.	"One Good Reason"	Moore	3:09
15.	"Oh Pretty Woman"	A.C. Williams	4:38
16.	"Still Got the Blues"	Moore
17.	"Walking by Myself"	Rogers	4:16

== Personnel ==
- Gary Moore - Lead vocals, lead and rhythm guitar
- Neil Carter - Keyboards, backing vocals, rhythm guitar
- Jonathan Noyce - Bass guitar
- Darrin Mooney - Drums

Live at Montreux 1997 Bonus tracks

- Gary Moore - Lead vocals, lead and rhythm guitar
- Magnus Fiennes - Keyboards
- Guy Pratt - Bass guitar, backing vocals
- Gary Husband - Drums
