= Dirty Fingers =

Studio album by Gary Moore
- Released: 1983
- Recorded: 1980
- Genres: Hard rock, heavy metal
- Length: 41:35
- Label: Jet
- Producer: Chris Tsangarides

Gary Moore chronology
Rockin' Every Night – Live in Japan (1983)	Dirty Fingers (1983)	Live (1983)

Singles from Dirty Fingers
- 1. "Nuclear Attack" Released: 1981 (UK); 2. "Don't Let Me Be Misunderstood" Released: 1984 (UK)

Professional ratings
Review scores
Source	Rating
AllMusic	2.5/5 stars
Collector's Guide to Heavy Metal	7/10

Dirty Fingers is the third solo studio album by Northern Irish guitarist Gary Moore. It was originally recorded in 1980, but was ultimately shelved in favour of the more "radio-oriented" G-Force album. Three of the tracks ("Nuclear Attack", "Don't Let Me Be Misunderstood" and "Run to Your Mama") were later released as an EP in 1981. The album was eventually released in Japan in 1983 by Jet Records, before an international release the following year. It was also released in the UK in June 1984.

== Track listing ==
All tracks are written by Gary Moore, except where noted.

Side one
No.	Title	Writer(s)	Length
1.	"Hiroshima"		4:30
2.	"Dirty Fingers" (instrumental)		1:09
3.	"Bad News"		5:06
4.	"Don't Let Me Be Misunderstood"	Bennie Benjamin, Sol Marcus, Gloria Caldwell	3:37
5.	"Run to Your Mama"		4:44

Side two
No.	Title	Length
6.	"Nuclear Attack"	5:11
7.	"Kidnapped"	3:50
8.	"Really Gonna Rock Tonight"	3:50
9.	"Lonely Nights"	3:58
10.	"Rest in Peace"	5:58

The sixth song, "Nuclear Attack", was also recorded as the first song on Greg Lake's debut album, with Moore playing lead guitar.

== Personnel ==
- Gary Moore – guitar, co-lead vocals on track 10, backing vocals
- Charlie Huhn – lead vocals
- Jimmy Bain – bass
- Don Airey – organ, keyboards
- Tommy Aldridge – drums

Production

- Chris Tsangarides – producer, engineer
- Kerusher Joule – design
- The Folkestone Finger – artwork
- Inky – artwork
