= How Blue Can You Get (album) =

Studio album by Gary Moore
- Released: 30 April 2021
- Genre: Blues, blues rock
- Length: 44:14
- Label: Mascot Label Group, Provogue Records
- Producer: Chris Tsangarides; Andy May; Graham Lilley; Ian Taylor

Gary Moore chronology
| Bad for You Baby (2008) | How Blue Can You Get (2021) |

How Blue Can You Get is a posthumous album by Northern Irish blues guitarist and singer-songwriter Gary Moore. The album contains four original tracks and four covers.

== Recording ==
"In My Dreams" and "Looking at Your Picture" are previously unreleased original tracks. "Steppin' Out" and "How Blue Can You Get" are previously unreleased cover songs. "Love Can Make a Fool of You" is an alternative version of a song that appeared on the 2002 reissue of Corridors of Power.

== Critical reception ==
Professional ratings
Review scores
| Source | Rating |
|---|---|
| Classic Rock | 3.5/5 stars |
| laut.de | 4/5 stars |
| Rolling Stone | 3/5 stars |

Rocks, in a positive review, praised Moore's guitar sound and style of playing. Blues News said "I'm Tore Down" is the highlight of the album. The audio quality of the album was described as somewhat resembling that of a demo recording with "Looking at Your Picture" having the worst quality among the songs.

== Track listing ==
| No. | Title | Writer(s) | Length |
|---|---|---|---|
| 1. | "I'm Tore Down" | Sonny Thompson | 6:10 |
| 2. | "Steppin' Out" | Peter Chatman | 3:18 |
| 3. | "In My Dreams" | Gary Moore | 5:42 |
| 4. | "How Blue Can You Get" | Leonard Feather | 7:15 |
| 5. | "Looking at Your Picture" | Gary Moore | 4:29 |
| 6. | "Love Can Make a Fool of You" | Gary Moore | 6:23 |
| 7. | "Done Somebody Wrong" | Elmore James, Morris Levy, Clarence Lewis | 3:44 |
| 8. | "Living with the Blues" | Gary Moore | 7:13 |

== Personnel ==
- Gary Moore – vocals, guitar
- Pete Rees – bass
- Vic Martin – keyboards
- Darrin Mooney – drums (on "I'm Tore Down", "In My Dreams", and "Done Somebody Wrong")
- Graham Walker – drums (on "Steppin' Out", "How Blue Can You Get", "Love Can Make a Fool of You", and "Living with the Blues")
- Roger King – drum programming (on "Looking at Your Picture")
