= Gary Moore & The Midnight Blues Band – Live at Montreux 1990 =

2004 live DVD by Gary Moore

Video by Gary Moore
- Released: 2004
- Recorded: 7 July 1990 / 9 July 1997 (bonus songs)
- Genre: Blues, blues-rock
- Length: 130:00 (approximately)
- Label: Eagle Rock Entertainment, Ltd.
- Producer: Claude Nobs – Montreux Sounds SA / Terry Shand & Geoff Kempin – Eagle Vision

Gary Moore chronology
Live at Monsters of Rock (2003)	Gary Moore & The Midnight Blues Band – Live at Montreux 1990 (2004)	One Night in Dublin: A Tribute to Phil Lynott (2006)

Gary Moore & The Midnight Blues Band – Live at Montreux 1990 is a live DVD by Gary Moore, recorded on 7 July 1990 and 9 July 1997 (bonus songs).

The Montreux Jazz Festival, founded in 1967, is one of the most prestigious annual music events in the world. Moore's 1990 performance was his first at the event, and was part of the tour supporting his Still Got the Blues album. Albert Collins was a featured guest at this performance. Moore later played the festival on a regular basis.

The DVD, released in 2004 by Eagle Vision, includes three bonus songs from Moore's 1997 performance at Montreux.

== Track listing ==
=== 1990 performance ===
1. "Oh Pretty Woman"
2. "Walking By Myself"
3. "The Stumble"
4. "All Your Love"
5. "Midnight Blues"
6. "You Don't Love Me"
7. "Still Got The Blues"
8. "Texas Strut"
9. "Moving On"
10. "Too Tired" (featuring Albert Collins)
11. "Cold Cold Feeling" (featuring Albert Collins)
12. "Farther Up the Road" (featuring Albert Collins)
13. "King of The Blues" (without Albert Collins)
14. "Stop Messin' Around"
15. "The Blues is Alright" (with Albert Collins)
16. "The Messiah Will Come Again"

=== 1997 performance (bonus songs) ===
17. "Out In The Fields"
18. "Over The Hills & Far Away"
19. "Parisienne Walkways"

== Personnel ==
=== 1990 concert line-up ===
- Gary Moore – lead vocals, guitar
- Don Airey – keyboards
- Andy Pyle – bass guitar
- Graham Walker – drums
- Frank Mead – alto saxophone, harmonica
- Nick Pentelow – tenor saxophone
- Nick Payn – baritone saxophone
- Martin Drover – trumpet

Special guest:

- Albert Collins – vocals, guitar (on tracks as noted)

=== 1997 concert line-up (bonus songs) ===
- Gary Moore – guitar, lead vocals
- Magnus Fiennes – keyboards
- Guy Pratt – bass guitar, backing vocals
- Gary Husband – drums

== Production ==
- Claude Nobs – executive producer for Montreux Sounds SA
- Terry Shand – executive producer for Eagle Vision
- Geoff Kempin – executive producer for Eagle Vision

== Certifications ==
Region	Certification	Certified units/sales
Australia (ARIA)	Gold	7,500^{^}
^{^} Shipments figures based on certification alone.
