= Close as You Get =

Studio album by Gary Moore
- Released: 21 May 2007
- Recorded: October 2006–February 2007
- Studio: Sarm Hookend, Sphere Studios
- Genre: Blues, blues rock
- Length: 51:48
- Label: Eagle
- Producer: Gary Moore, Ian Taylor

Gary Moore chronology
The Platinum Collection (2006)	Close as You Get (2007)	Bad for You Baby (2008)

Close as You Get is sixteenth solo album by Northern Irish blues guitarist and singer Gary Moore. The album reunited Moore with his former Thin Lizzy colleague, drummer Brian Downey who played on all the tracks.

Professional ratings
Review scores
Source	Rating
Allmusic	4/5 stars

== Track listing ==
No.	Title	Writer(s)	Length
1.	"If the Devil Made Whiskey"	Moore	2:48
2.	"Trouble at Home"	Moore	5:00
3.	"Thirty Days"	Chuck Berry	3:16
4.	"Hard Times"	Moore	3:04
5.	"Have You Heard?"	John Mayall	5:49
6.	"Eyesight to the Blind"	Sonny Boy Williamson	2:34
7.	"Evenin'"	Royce Swain	5:47
8.	"Nowhere Fast"	Moore	3:38
9.	"Checkin' Up on My Baby"	Sonny Boy Williamson	5:24
10.	"I Had a Dream"	Moore	7:16
11.	"Sundown"	Son House	7:08

== Personnel ==
- Gary Moore - vocals, guitar, dobro on "Sundown"
- Brian Downey - drums
- Vic Martin - keyboards
- Pete Rees - bass
- Mark Feltham - harmonica on "Hard Times" and "Checkin' Up on My Baby"
- Produced by Gary Moore and Ian Taylor
- Engineered and mixed by Ian Taylor, assisted by Jonathan Tayler-Webb.
- Recorded and mixed at Sarm Hookend, except "I Had a Dream" backing track, recorded at Sphere Studios by Franco Cameli, assisted by Joshua Blair.
