= Old New Ballads Blues =

Old, New, Ballads, Blues

Studio album by Gary Moore
- Released: 2 May 2006
- Genres: Blues rock, hard rock
- Length: 55:32
- Label: Eagle
- Producer: Gary Moore

Gary Moore chronology
| Power of the Blues (2004) | Old, New, Ballads, Blues (2006) | The Platinum Collection (2006) |

Professional ratings
Review scores
| Source | Rating |
|---|---|
| Allmusic | 3/5 stars |
| Scream Magazine | 4/6 |

Old, New, Ballads, Blues is the fifteenth solo album by Northern Irish blues guitarist and singer Gary Moore.

== Track listing ==
All tracks are written by Gary Moore, except where noted.

| No. | Title | Writer(s) | Length |
|---|---|---|---|
| 1. | "Done Somebody Wrong" | Elmore James | 3:07 |
| 2. | "You Know My Love" | Willie Dixon | 7:17 |
| 3. | "Midnight Blues (2006)" | | 5:45 |
| 4. | "Ain't Nobody" | | 4:51 |
| 5. | "Gonna Rain Today" | | 4:39 |
| 6. | "All Your Love (2006)" | Otis Rush | 4:29 |
| 7. | "Flesh & Blood" | | 4:52 |
| 8. | "Cut It Out (Instrumental)" | | 5:35 |
| 9. | "No Reason to Cry" | | 9:01 |
| 10. | "I'll Play the Blues" | | 6:03 |

== Personnel ==
- Gary Moore - guitars, vocals
- Don Airey - keyboards
- Jonathan Noyce - bass
- Darrin Mooney - drums
