= Back to the Blues (Gary Moore album) =

Studio album by Gary Moore
- Released: 12 March 2001
- Genre: Blues rock, hard rock
- Length: 53:25
- Label: Sanctuary
- Producer: Gary Moore, Chris Tsangarides

Gary Moore chronology
A Different Beat (1999)	Back to the Blues (2001)	Best of the Blues (2002)

Professional ratings
Review scores
Source	Rating
AllMusic	2.5/5 stars
The Penguin Guide to Blues Recordings	2.5/4 stars

Back to the Blues is the thirteenth solo studio album by Northern Irish guitarist Gary Moore, released in 2001. As implied by its title, it saw Moore return to the electric blues music with which he had found fame since 1990, after two more experimental albums. It was also Moore's first album to feature Darrin Mooney on drums; Mooney would go on to fill the drumming spot on Moore's next two studio albums, as well as his short-lived Scars project and several live albums.

The cover photograph is of Moore at Therapia Lane Tram Depot, Croydon.

All tracks from this album were re-released on the multi-disc compilation, "Blues and Beyond" in 2017.

== Track listing ==
All tracks are written by Gary Moore, except where noted

No.	Title	Writer(s)	Length
1.	"Enough of the Blues"		4:47
2.	"You Upset Me Baby"	Joseph Bihari, B.B. King, Jules Taub	3:13
3.	"Cold Black Night"		4:18
4.	"Stormy Monday"	T-Bone Walker	6:53
5.	"I Ain't Got You"	Calvin Carter	2:53
6.	"Picture of the Moon"		7:14
7.	"Looking Back"	Johnny "Guitar" Watson	2:19
8.	"The Prophet"		6:19
9.	"How Many Lies"		6:09
10.	"Drowning in Tears"		9:20

== Personnel ==
- Gary Moore - guitar, vocals
- Vic Martin - keyboards
- Pete Rees - bass
- Darrin Mooney - drums

Horns on track 2:

- Martin Drover - trumpet
- Frank Mead - tenor saxophone
- Nick Payn - baritone saxophone
- Nick Pentelow - tenor saxophone

Brass arrangement by Gary Moore & Nick Payn
