= Bad for You Baby =

Studio album by Gary Moore
- Released: 22 September 2008
- Studio: Sarm West, Sphere Studios, London
- Genre: Blues, Blues rock
- Length: 55:29
- Label: Eagle Records
- Producer: Gary Moore

Gary Moore chronology
Close as You Get (2007)	Bad for You Baby (2008)	Essential Montreux (2009)

Bad for You Baby is the seventeenth solo album by Northern Irish blues guitarist and singer-songwriter Gary Moore, the last album to be released in his lifetime, and the last album until 2021's How Blue Can You Get.

== Background ==
The album features a hard rock-influenced sound similar to the sound of the artist's releases over the previous several years. It includes covers of two songs best known for their versions done by Muddy Waters. The release also includes notable collaborative work with musicians Cassie Taylor and Otis Taylor. It is the last studio album released by Moore during his lifetime; he died on 6 February 2011.

== Critical reception ==
The album has received positive critical reviews from publications such as Allmusic, with critic Hal Horowitz stating that Moore's "under-appreciated voice is strong and convincing on originals and covers" while the artist's "tough guitar lines" also have a "biting yet classy" sound.

Professional ratings
Review scores
Source	Rating
Allmusic	3.5/5 stars
Reverend Keith A. Gordon	3.5/5 stars

== Track listing ==
All tracks are written by Gary Moore, except where noted.

No.	Title	Writer(s)	Length
1.	"Bad for You Baby"		2:55
2.	"Down the Line"		2:55
3.	"Umbrella Man"		3:36
4.	"Holding On"		3:45
5.	"Walkin' Thru the Park"	McKinley Morganfield	2:58
6.	"I Love You More Than You'll Ever Know"	Al Kooper	10:34
7.	"Mojo Boogie"	J. B. Lenoir	3:34
8.	"Someday Baby"	Morganfield	3:35
9.	"Did You Ever Feel Lonely?"		6:10
10.	"Preacher Man Blues"		5:53
11.	"Trouble Ain't Far Behind"		9:34

Bonus track

Japanese CD and Download
No.	Title	Writer(s)	Length
12.	"Picture on the Wall"	Lightnin' Hopkins

== Personnel ==
- Gary Moore – vocals, guitar, harmonica
- Pete Rees – bass
- Vic Martin – keyboards
- Otis Taylor – banjo (on "Preacher Man Blues")
- Cassie Taylor – backing vocals (on "Holding On" and "Preacher Man Blues")
- Sam Kelly – drums
