= Back on the Streets (Gary Moore album) =

Studio album by Gary Moore
- Released: September 1978
- Studio: Morgan, London
- Genre: Hard rock, blues rock, jazz fusion
- Length: 37:01
- Label: MCA
- Producer: Chris Tsangarides, Gary Moore

Gary Moore chronology
Grinding Stone (1973)	Back on the Streets (1978)	G-Force (1980)

US LP cover

Singles from Back on the Streets
- 1. "Back on the Streets" Released: 20 October 1978; 2. "Parisienne Walkways" Released: 6 April 1979

Professional ratings
Review scores
Source	Rating
AllMusic	2.5/5 stars
Record Collector	2/5 stars

Back on the Streets is the first album by Northern Irish guitarist Gary Moore, released in September 1978.

== Background ==
The album is Moore's first authentic solo record (1973's Grinding Stone album being credited to the Gary Moore Band). Thin Lizzy bassist/vocalist Phil Lynott and drummer Brian Downey appear on four songs, including "Don't Believe a Word" (which originally appeared on the 1976 Thin Lizzy album Johnny the Fox) and the UK top 10 single "Parisienne Walkways". On the album's sleeve, Moore is depicted leaving notorious prison Wormwood Scrubs in the Inner London Borough of Hammersmith and Fulham in a photograph by Chalkie Davies.

== Release ==
The album was re-issued in 1989 by Grand Slam Records with a revised playing order and an additional track ("Spanish Guitar"). More bonus tracks were available for download and on the Universal Music Group Remastered CD edition of 2013. The tracks "Road of Pain" and "Track Ten" recorded in the same sessions, remain unreleased. Yet another release with the title Back on the Streets, but no other apparent connection to the original album, is a 2003 compilation of Gary Moore's greatest hits.

== Track listings ==
Side one
No.	Title	Writer(s)	Length
1.	"Back on the Streets"	Gary Moore	4:21
2.	"Don't Believe a Word"	Phil Lynott	3:47
3.	"Fanatical Fascists"	Lynott	3:00
4.	"Flight of the Snow Moose" (instrumental)	Moore	7:17

Side two
No.	Title	Writer(s)	Length
5.	"Hurricane" (instrumental)	Moore	4:53
6.	"Song for Donna"	Moore	5:27
7.	"What Would You Rather Bee or a Wasp" (instrumental)	Moore	4:52
8.	"Parisienne Walkways"	Lynott, Moore	3:20

1989 Grand Slam Records CD reissue
No.	Title	Writer(s)	Length
1.	"Back on the Streets"		4:18
2.	"Song for Donna"		5:22
3.	"What Would You Rather Bee or a Wasp"		4:48
4.	"Fanatical Fascists"		2:44
5.	"Spanish Guitar"	Lynott, Moore	3:48
6.	"Don't Believe a Word"		3:34
7.	"Flight of the Snow Moose"		6:59
8.	"Hurricane"		4:50
9.	"Parisienne Walkways"		3:08
Total length:			39:31

2013 Universal Music Group Remastered CD edition bonus tracks
No.	Title	Writer(s)	Length
9.	"Track Nine" (instrumental)	Moore	5:01
10.	"Spanish Guitar" (vocals by Phil Lynott)		3:51
11.	"Spanish Guitar" (vocals by Gary Moore)		3:57
12.	"Spanish Guitar" (instrumental)		3:48
Total length:			53:39

== Personnel ==
Musicians

- Gary Moore – guitars, lead vocals, bass on track 1, guitar synthesizer, mandolin and accordion on track 8, producer
- Phil Lynott – bass on tracks 2, 3, 8–12, double bass on track 8, acoustic guitar on track 3, lead vocals on tracks 2, 8 and 10, backing vocals on tracks 1 and 3
- Don Airey – keyboards, organ, piano on tracks 1, 4–7
- John Mole – bass guitar on tracks 4–7
- Brian Downey – drums, percussion on tracks 2, 3, 8–12
- Simon Phillips – drums, percussion on tracks 1, 4–7

Production

- Chris Tsangarides – producer, engineer
- Andrew Warwick, Mark Freegard, Mike Dutton, Mike Hedges, Perry Morgan, Simon Wakefield – assistant engineers

== Charts ==
Chart (1979)	Peak position
UK Albums (OCC)	70
