= Corridors of Power (album) =

Studio album by Gary Moore
- Released: October 1982
- Studio: Townhouse and AIR (London)
- Genre: Hard rock; heavy metal
- Length: 43:10
- Label: Virgin
- Producer: Jeff Glixman

Gary Moore chronology
| G-Force (1980) | Corridors of Power (1982) | Rockin' Every Night – Live in Japan (1983) |

Singles from Corridors of Power
- 1. "Always Gonna Love You" Released: September 1982; 2. "Falling in Love with You" Released: February 1983

US LP cover

Professional ratings
Review scores
| Source | Rating |
|---|---|
| AllMusic | 4/5 stars |
| Collector's Guide to Heavy Metal | 5/10 |

Corridors of Power is the second solo studio album by Northern Irish guitarist Gary Moore, released in October 1982.

== Background ==
The album contains a cover of the Free song "Wishing Well". The track "End of the World" features Jack Bruce of Cream sharing lead vocals with Moore. Moore would later join with Bruce again on the Bruce-Baker-Moore project in 1993. The album also features then-former Deep Purple drummer Ian Paice, ex-Whitesnake bassist Neil Murray and former Uriah Heep singer John Sloman on backing vocals, with contributions from keyboardists Tommy Eyre and Don Airey, drummer Bobby Chouinard and bassist Mo Foster.

The first 25,000 vinyl copies of Corridors of Power came with a bonus EP featuring three live tracks recorded at the Marquee, London on 25 August 1982.

Japanese rock singer Mari Hamada covered "Love Can Make a Fool of You" (Retitled as "Love, Love, Love") on her 1985 album Rainbow Dream. A far bluesier version of the song also showed up on the posthumous Gary Moore album How Blue Can You Get. As a nod to Corridors of Power, American guitarist Jeff Kollman named his 2012 solo album Silence in the Corridor, the title track of which is a tribute to Moore.

== Track listing ==
All tracks are written by Gary Moore, except where indicated.

Side one
| No. | Title | Writer(s) | Length |
|---|---|---|---|
| 1. | "Don't Take Me for a Loser" | | 4:17 |
| 2. | "Always Gonna Love You" | | 3:56 |
| 3. | "Wishing Well" (Free cover) | Paul Rodgers, Simon Kirke, Tetsu Yamauchi, John "Rabbit" Bundrick, Paul Kossoff | 4:06 |
| 4. | "Gonna Break My Heart Again" | | 3:19 |
| 5. | "Falling in Love with You" | | 4:52 |

Side two
| No. | Title | Writer(s) | Length |
|---|---|---|---|
| 6. | "End of the World" | | 6:53 |
| 7. | "Rockin' Every Night" | Moore, Ian Paice | 2:48 |
| 8. | "Cold Hearted" | | 5:12 |
| 9. | "I Can't Wait Until Tomorrow" | | 7:47 |

2002 remastered CD bonus tracks
| No. | Title | Length |
|---|---|---|
| 10. | "Falling in Love with You" (Remix) | 4:10 |
| 11. | "Falling in Love with You" (Remix instrumental) | 4:24 |
| 12. | "Love Can Make a Fool of You" | 4:06 |
| Total length: | | 55:50 |

== Personnel ==
- Gary Moore – lead and rhythm guitars, lead and backing vocals, cover concept
- Neil Murray – bass (all except track 5)
- Tommy Eyre – keyboards (all except track 5)
- Ian Paice – drums, percussion (all except track 6)

Additional personnel

- John Sloman – backing vocals
- Mo Foster – bass on track 5
- Don Airey – keyboards on track 5
- Jack Bruce – co-lead vocals on track 6
- Bobby Chouinard – drums on track 6

Technical personnel

- Jeff Glixman – production
- Steve Prestage – engineering, mixing
- Nigel Walker – engineering
- Ian Cooper – mastering
- Graphyk – art direction

== Charts ==
| Chart (1982–1983) | Peak position |
|---|---|
| UK Albums (OCC) | 30 |
| US Billboard 200 | 149 |
