= G-Force (album) =

Studio album by G-Force
- Released: 30 May 1980
- Recorded: December 1979 – January 1980
- Studio: Cherokee Studios, Hollywood and Record Plant, Los Angeles, California
- Genre: Pop rock; hard rock
- Length: 40:34
- Label: Jet
- Producer: Gary Moore, Mark Nauseef, Willie Dee, Tony Newton

Gary Moore chronology
| Back on the Streets (1978) | G-Force (1980) | Corridors of Power (1982) |

Singles from G-Force
- 1. "Hot Gossip" Released: 23 May 1980; 2. "You" Released: August 1980; 3. "White Knuckles" / "Rockin' and Rollin'" Released: 28 November 1980

Professional ratings
Review scores
| Source | Rating |
|---|---|
| AllMusic | 2.5/5 stars |
| Collector's Guide to Heavy Metal | 7/10 |
| Q Magazine | 3/5 stars |

G-Force is a 1980 studio album by the namesake Irish-American band led by Irish rock guitarist Gary Moore. It featured three singles and was re-released in 1990 on Castle Communications.

Jeff Clark-Meads in Q Magazine noted that the "album exemplifies Moore's uncompromising, raw, wildman-virtuoso guitar-style".

After cooperating with Phil Lynott on Back on the Streets (1978), guitarist Gary Moore moved to L.A. and formed the group G-Force with vocalist Willy Dee, bassist Tony Newton, and drummer Mark Nauseef. The group did not hold together much longer than it took to finish the first and only album, and on its re-release on CD, only Moore gets credit.

== Track listing ==
Side 1
| No. | Title | Writer(s) | Lead vocals | Length |
|---|---|---|---|---|
| 1. | "You" | Gary Moore | Willie Dee & Moore | 4:11 |
| 2. | "White Knuckles / Rockin' and Rollin'^{†}" | Moore / Moore, Mark Nauseef | Instrumental / Dee | 5:10 |
| 3. | "She's Got You" | Moore, Nauseef | Dee & Moore | 4:53 |
| 4. | "I Look at You" | Moore | Dee | 6:02 |

Side 2
| No. | Title | Writer(s) | Lead vocals | Length |
|---|---|---|---|---|
| 5. | "Because of Your Love" | Tony Newton, Dee, Duane Hitchings | Dee | 4:00 |
| 6. | "You Kissed Me Sweetly" | Newton, Dee | Dee | 4:16 |
| 7. | "Hot Gossip" | Moore | Moore | 3:34 |
| 8. | "The Woman's in Love" | Moore | Moore & Dee | 3:53 |
| 9. | "Dancin'" | Moore, Nauseef, Newton, Dee | Dee | 4:30 |

^† — Separated into two tracks on some issues of the album

== Personnel ==
G–Force

- Willie Dee – lead and backing vocals, bass, keyboards, Korg bass synthesizer, production
- Gary Moore – guitars, lead and backing vocals, keyboards and string arrangements (on tracks 4 and 8), production
- Tony Newton – bass, string arrangements (on track 6), production
- Mark Nauseef – drums, percussion, percussion synthesizer, production

Additional personnel

- Joachim Kuhn – additional keyboards
- Tom Scott – saxophone (on track 8), string arrangements (on track 4 and 6)
- Thee Ox – marimba

Technical personnel

- Mack, Mark Sackett and Tom La Tondre – engineers
- Dennis Mackay – remixing (on tracks 1–3, 5, 7 and 9)
- Moshe Brakha – photography
