= Scars (Gary Moore album) =

Studio album by Scars
- Released: 26 August 2002 (Europe); 2 September 2002 (UK); 4 September 2002 (Japan); 10 September 2002 (US)
- Recorded: 2002
- Studio: Sarm West Studios and Music Bank's Waterloo Sunset Studios, London; Sarm Hook End, Reading, Berkshire; Parkgate Studios, Battle, East Sussex
- Genre: Blues rock, hard rock
- Length: 59:50
- Label: Sanctuary; Victor (Japan only)
- Producer: Chris Tsangarides, Gary Moore

Scars chronology
Best of the Blues (2002)	Scars (2002)	Have Some Moore (2002)

Professional ratings
Review scores
Source	Rating
AllMusic	3/5 stars
Rock Hard	8.0/10

Scars is a 2002 album by the Gary Moore-led blues rock group called Scars (not to be confused with the Edinburgh post-punk group called Scars).

In 2002 Gary Moore decided to form a band with ex-Skunk Anansie bassist Cass Lewis and Primal Scream drummer Darrin Mooney called Scars. A spokesman for Sanctuary Records says: "Gary was blown away by the power and precision of Mooney's playing when he was auditioning drummers [...], and while looking for a bassist to complete the new line-up Darrin suggested that he take a look at Cass. When they all got together to play for the first time, it was perfect. Everything just clicked. It was so natural, so completely uncontrived that it was immediately obvious to Moore that this was going to be the ultimate line-up, and he was right.". This album and band title may allude to both Moore's emotional scars or the scars on his face he had contracted through a broken glass in a bar dispute in the late 1970s when he was protecting his girlfriend from harassment.

Their studio album "Scars", released on 2 September on Sanctuary Records, includes compositions reminiscent of the sound of artists like Jimi Hendrix and Stevie Ray Vaughan, in a modern way.

== Track listing ==
All tracks are written by Gary Moore, except 1, 2, 6 and 8, co-written with Cass Lewis and Darrin Mooney

No.	Title	Length
1.	"When the Sun Goes Down"	4:19
2.	"Rectify"	4:21
3.	"Wasn't Born in Chicago"	4:35
4.	"Stand Up"	4:11
5.	"Just Can't Let You Go"	7:40
6.	"My Baby (She's So Good to Me)"	3:26
7.	"World of Confusion"	4:22
8.	"Ball and Chain"	12:53
9.	"World Keep Turnin' Round"	4:15
10.	"Who Knows (What Tomorrow May Bring)?"	9:48

== Personnel ==
Scars

- Gary Moore – vocals, guitars, production, mixing
- Cass Lewis – bass, backing vocals
- Darrin Mooney – drums

Technical personnel

- Chris Tsangarides – producer, engineer, mixing
- Tim Hole, Dan Turner, Drew Roberts, Matt Crawford – assistant engineers
- Ian Cooper – mastering at Metropolis Mastering, London
