= Darrin Mooney =

- Born: Darrin Shane Mooney; 26 April 1967 (age 59); Merton, London, England
- Genres: Alternative rock; indie rock
- Occupations: Session drummer; percussionist
- Instruments: Drums; percussion
- Years active: 1986–present

Darrin Shane Mooney (born 26 April 1967) is an English musician and session drummer, best known for his work with Primal Scream and Gary Moore.

Mooney started playing at the age of 12 at school. Mooney attended Raynes Park High School. Throughout his school years, he played in various school bands and orchestras, playing both drums and percussion. At the age of 18, Mooney went along to a NYJO (National Youth Jazz Orchestra) rehearsal in London and was inspired as he watched the others play.

In 1997 he joined Primal Scream and worked with Gary Moore from 2001. He has also played with China Black, Matt Bianco, Ragga Twins, Bonnie Tyler, Martin Barre and others.

== Discography ==
- 1996 – Martin Barre – The Meeting
- 1996 – Babylon Zoo – The Boy With the X-Ray Eyes
- 1998 – Primal Scream – Badlands
- 1998 – Judie Tzuke – Over the Moon
- 1998 – Colin Blunstone – The Light Inside
- 1998 – Massive Attack/Primal Scream – "Teardrop" (remix)
- 1999 – The Mighty Strynth – What Is It
- 1999 – Babylon Zoo – King Kong Groover
- 2000 – Ian Anderson – The Secret Language of Birds
- 2000 – Primal Scream/Paul Weller – "When the Kingdom Comes"
- 2000 – Primal Scream – XTRMNTR
- 2001 – Gary Moore – Back to the Blues
- 2002 – Scars – Scars
- 2002 – Primal Scream – Evil Heat
- 2003 – Primal Scream – Dirty Hits
- 2003 – Primal Scream – Live in Japan
- 2003 – Queens of the Stoneage/Unkle – "No One Knows" (remix)
- 2003 – Skin – Flesh Wounds
- 2003 – Gary Moore's Scars – Live at Monsters of Rock
- 2003 – Gary Moore's Scars – Live at Monsters of Rock (DVD)
- 2003 – Martin Barre – Stage Left
- 2004 – Primal Scream – Shoot Speed – More Dirty Hits
- 2004 – Bent – Now I Must Remember
- 2004 – Deepest Blue – "Can't Believe"
- 2004 – Deepest Blue – "Shooting Star"
- 2004 – Gary Moore – Power of the Blues
- 2004 – Shaznay Lewis – Heart Made Me a Fool
- 2006 – Primal Scream – "Riot City Blues"
- 2006 – Primal Scream – "Gamblin' Bar Room Blues"
- 2006 – Primal Scream – "It's Not Enough"
- 2006 – Primal Scream – "To Live is to Fly"
- 2006 – Primal Scream – "Bloods"
- 2006 – Primal Scream – "Zeppelin Blues"
- 2006 – Gary Moore – Old New Ballads Blues
- 2006 – Cliff Richard/Dionne Warwick – "Anyone Who Had A Heart"
- 2007 – Queens of the Stoneage/Primal Scream – "I’m Designer" (remix)
- 2007 – Primal Scream – Riot City Blues (Live DVD)
- 2007 – Dust Galaxy – Dust Galaxy
- 2007 – Leanne Harte – Leanne Harte
- 2008 – Primal Scream – "Beautiful Future"
- 2008 – Primal Scream – "Time of the Assassins"
- 2008 – Primal Scream – "Jesus is My Aeroplane"
- 2008 – Primal Scream – "Can't Go Back"
- 2008 – Primal Scream – "Diamonds, Fur Coats, Champagne"
- 2008 – Primal Scream – "Urban Guerilla"
- 2008 – Primal Scream – "I Call My Baby Pussycat"
- 2008 – Primal Scream – "I Want You"
- 2008 – Primal Scream – "The Fire of Love"
- 2008 – Primal Scream – "The Train Kept a Rollin'"
- 2008 – Don Airey – "A Light in the Sky"
- 2008 – Oasis/Primal Scream – "The Shock of the Lightning"
- 2008 – David Holmes – Holy Pictures
- 2011 – Dionne Bromfield – "Yeah Right"
- 2011 – Dionne Bromfield – "Do You Remember Our Love"
- 2011 – Dionne Bromfield – "Mugging"
- 2011 – Dionne Bromfield – "That's The Way You Wonna Play"
- 2011 – Wonderland – "What Do You Want"
- 2011 – Wonderland – "In Your Arms"
- 2011 – Gary Moore – Live at Montreux 2010
- 2013 – Primal Scream – More Light
- 2016 – Primal Scream – Chaosmosis
