= Parisienne Walkways =

Single by Gary Moore

from the album Back on the Streets
- B-side: "Fanatical Fascists"
- Released: 6 April 1979
- Genre: Blues rock
- Length: 3:08
- Label: MCA
- Songwriters: Phil Lynott, Gary Moore
- Producers: Chris Tsangarides; Gary Moore

Gary Moore singles chronology
"Parisienne Walkways" (1979)	"Spanish Guitar" (1979)

"Parisienne Walkways" is a song by guitarist Gary Moore that reached number 8 in the UK Singles Chart in May 1979. The song is featured on Moore's album Back on the Streets and features a vocal from Thin Lizzy frontman, Phil Lynott, who co-wrote the song with Moore. Lynott also played bass guitar on the track, alongside Thin Lizzy drummer Brian Downey, thus reuniting the short-lived 1974 Thin Lizzy line-up which had recorded "Still in Love with You", "Sitamoia" and the single "Little Darling". The melody of "Parisienne Walkways" is based on the jazz standard "Blue Bossa" by Kenny Dorham. It became Gary Moore's signature song.

According to Richard Buskin, the opening line, "I remember Paris in '49", was an amendment of the line as it appeared in the original sheet music – "I remember Paris in the fall tonight" – and refers to Phil's estranged father, Cecil Parris, and his birth-year, 1949. A lament for the father he never had, dressed up in romantic nostalgia.

The guitarist continued to play the song as an encore at concerts throughout his career. A live version of the track, recorded at the Royal Albert Hall, was released in 1993 as part of a limited edition 4-track CD single entitled "Parisienne Walkways '93" and went on to reach #32 in the UK Singles Chart. This version appeared on Moore's 1993 live album Blues Alive and was also included on the 2002 compilation album The Best Air Guitar Album in the World... II. The original single and a 1983 live version feature as the first and final track on the 2006 compilation, The Platinum Collection.

Gary Moore played the song in concert while with the Greg Lake Band during 1981–82. Their performance on 5 November 1981, recorded at the Hammersmith Odeon in London, and aired on the King Biscuit Flower Hour radio broadcast, was first released on CD in 1995 on the band's third album King Biscuit Flower Hour Presents Greg Lake in Concert.

== Track listing ==
1979 UK 7" single

1. "Parisienne Walkways" (Lynott, Moore) – 3:08
2. "Fanatical Fascists" (Lynott) – 2:44

1993 UK 7" single

1. "Parisienne Walkways '93" – 5:01
2. "Still Got the Blues" – 6:54

1993 UK CD single

1. "Parisienne Walkways '93" – 5:01
2. "Since I Met You Baby" (with B. B. King) – 4:40
3. "Still Got the Blues" – 6:54
4. "Key to Love" – 2:20

== Chart performance ==
Chart (1979)	Peak position
Irish Singles Chart	5
UK Singles Chart	8
Chart (1993)^{1}	Peak position
Australia (ARIA)	137
French SNEP Singles Chart	9

^{1} 1993 live version

== Personnel ==
- Gary Moore – guitars, backing vocals, mandolin, accordion, production
- Phil Lynott – lead vocals, bass guitar, double bass
- Brian Downey – drums

== Cover versions ==
The Shadows covered it on their 1979 album String of Hits.

Tribe of Gypsies recorded a cover for their 2000 album Standing on the Shoulders of Giants, with a dedication to Phil Lynott's mother, Philomena. The track also appeared on The Spirit of the Black Rose – A Tribute to Philip Parris Lynott album in 2001.

Queen's Brian May and Kerry Ellis covered the song on their 2017 Album Golden Days.

Former Gary Moore bassist Bob Daisley recorded the song with Steve Morse and Ricky Warwick for the Daisley initiated Moore Blues for Gary (A Tribute to Gary Moore) album, released in 2018.
