= Gary Moore =

Northern Irish musician (1952–2011)

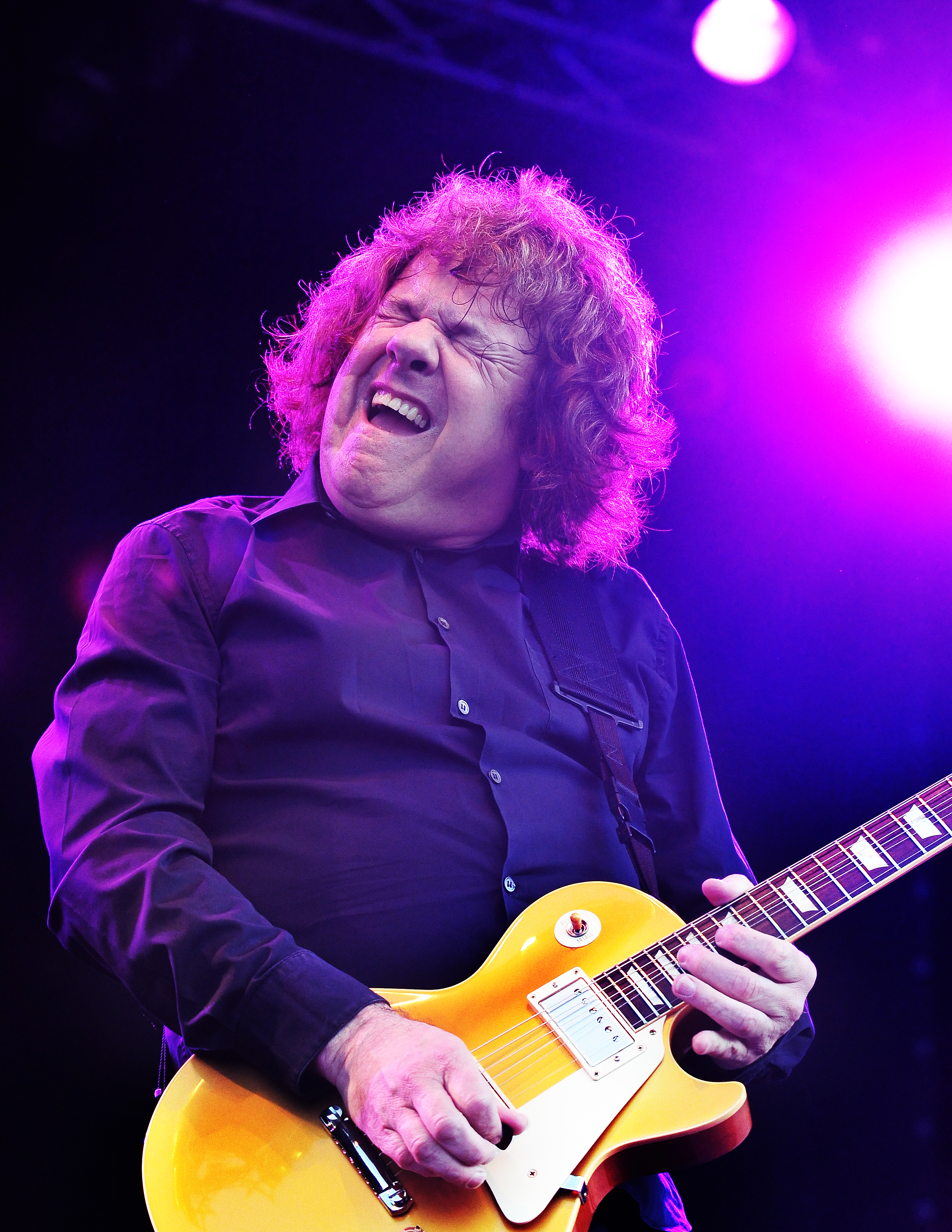
- Moore performing at Pite Havsbad Beach in Piteå, Sweden, 2008

Background information
- Born: Robert William Gary Moore; 4 April 1952; Belfast, Northern Ireland
- Died: 6 February 2011 (aged 58) Estepona, Spain
- Genres: Blues; blues rock; hard rock; heavy metal; jazz fusion; rock and roll; progressive rock
- Occupations: Musician; songwriter
- Instruments: Guitar; vocals
- Years active: 1968–2011
- Labels: MCA; Jet; Virgin; Sanctuary; Eagle
- Formerly of: Skid Row; Thin Lizzy; Colosseum II; G-Force; Greg Lake; Scars
- Website: gary-moore.com

Robert William Gary Moore (4 April 1952 – 6 February 2011) was a Northern Irish musician. Over the course of his career, he played in various groups and performed a range of music, including blues, blues rock, hard rock, heavy metal, and jazz fusion.

Influenced by Peter Green and Eric Clapton, Moore began his career in the late 1960s when he joined Skid Row, with whom he released two albums. After Moore left the group, he joined Thin Lizzy, featuring his former Skid Row bandmate and frequent collaborator Phil Lynott. Moore began his solo career in the 1970s and achieved major success with 1979's "Parisienne Walkways", which is considered his signature song. During the 1980s, he transitioned to playing hard rock and heavy metal, achieving varying degrees of international success. In 1990, he returned to his roots with Still Got the Blues, which became his most successful album. Moore continued to release new music throughout his later career, collaborating with other artists from time to time. He died on 6 February 2011 from a heart attack while on holiday in Spain.

Moore was often described as a virtuoso and has been cited as an influence by many other guitar players. He was voted as one of the greatest guitarists of all time on respective lists by Total Guitar and Louder. Irish singer-songwriter Bob Geldof said that "without question, [Moore] was one of the great Irish bluesmen". For most of his career, Moore was heavily associated with Peter Green's famed 1959 Gibson Les Paul guitar. Moore was honoured by Heritage, Gibson and Fender with several signature model guitars.

== Early life ==
Robert William Gary Moore was born in Belfast on 4 April 1952, the son of Winnie, a housewife, and Robert Moore, a promoter who ran the Queen's Hall ballroom in Holywood a few miles east of Belfast. The younger Robert grew up near Stormont Estate in Ballymiscaw with his four siblings. He sang "Sugartime" after his father invited him onstage to sing with a showband at an event that his father had organised. This first sparked the younger Robert's interest in music, and he credits his father with starting him in music by allowing him to perform. The older Robert bought his son his first guitar, a second-hand Framus acoustic, when Moore was 10 years old.

Though left-handed, the younger Robert learned to play the instrument right-handed. Not long after, he formed his first band, The Beat Boys, who mainly performed Beatles songs. He later joined Platform Three and The Method, amongst others. Around this time, he befriended guitarist Rory Gallagher, who often performed at the same venues as him. He left Belfast for Dublin in 1968 just as The Troubles were beginning in Northern Ireland. A year later, his parents separated.

== Career ==
=== Skid Row ===
After moving to Dublin, Moore joined the Irish blues rock band Skid Row. At the time, the group was fronted by vocalist Phil Lynott. He and Moore soon became friends and shared a bedsit in Ballsbridge, a neighbourhood in the southern part of Dublin. However, after a medical leave of absence, Lynott was asked to leave Skid Row by the band's bassist Brush Shiels, who had taken over lead vocal duties. In 1970, Skid Row signed a recording contract with CBS Records International and released their debut album Skid, which reached number 30 on the UK Albums Chart. After the album 34 Hours in 1971 and tours supporting The Allman Brothers Band and Mountain amongst others, Moore decided to leave the band. He had become frustrated by Skid Row's "limitations" and opted to start a solo career. In retrospect, Moore commented, "Skid Row was a laugh but I don't have really fond memories of it, because at the time I was very mixed up about what I was doing." Sebastian Bach, former frontman of the American heavy metal band Skid Row, claimed that Moore sold them the rights to the name in 1987 for a reported $35,000. Shiels contested the story in 2012 claiming he still owns the rights. Rachel Bolan of the American Skid Row also refuted the story in 2019, saying, "There was never any money exchange. Snake and I went and trademarked the name, and there was no problem."

=== Thin Lizzy ===
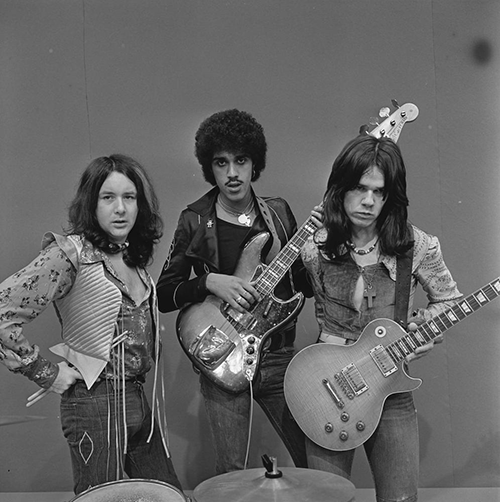
Moore (right) performing with Thin Lizzy in February 1974 on the Dutch programme TopPop.

After leaving Skid Row, Phil Lynott formed the hard rock group Thin Lizzy. After the departure of guitarist Eric Bell, Moore was recruited to help finish the band's ongoing tour in early 1974. A 1974 performance of the song "The Rocker", on the Dutch TV programme TopPop, features Moore. Moore recorded three songs with the band during this time, including "Still in Love with You", which he co-wrote. The song was later included on Thin Lizzy's fourth album Nightlife. He left Thin Lizzy in April 1974. While he enjoyed his time in the band, he felt it wasn't good for him: "After a few months I was doing myself in, drinking and high on the whole thing."

In 1977, Moore rejoined Thin Lizzy for a tour of the United States after guitarist Brian Robertson injured his hand in a bar fight. After finishing the tour, Lynott asked Moore to join the band on a permanent basis, but he declined. Robertson eventually returned to the group, before leaving for good in 1978. Moore took his place once again, this time for long enough to record the album Black Rose: A Rock Legend, which was released in 1979. The record was a success, being certified gold in the UK. However, he abruptly left Thin Lizzy that July in the middle of another tour. He had become fed up with the band's increasing drug use and the effects it was having on their performance. He was temporarily replaced by Scotsman Midge Ure from Ultravox, then another Scotsman Dave Flett from Manfred Mann's Earth Band before English guitarist and Pink Floyd backing musician Snowy White became the official replacement for Moore. He later said that he had no regrets about leaving the band, "but maybe it was wrong the way I did it. I could've done it differently, I suppose. But I just had to leave." Thin Lizzy eventually disbanded in 1983 with Moore making guest appearances on the band's farewell tour. Some of the performances were released on the live album Life.

After Lynott's death in January 1986, Moore performed with members of Thin Lizzy at the Self Aid concert in May of that year. He joined the stage with former Thin Lizzy members again in August 2005, when a bronze statue of Lynott was unveiled in Dublin. A recording of the concert was released as One Night in Dublin: A Tribute to Phil Lynott.

=== Solo career ===
In 1973, Moore released the album Grinding Stone, which was credited to The Gary Moore Band. An eclectic mix of blues, rock and jazz, it was a commercial flop with Moore still unsure of his musical direction. The Gary Moore Band had toured the UK as a supporting act during 1972. Between stints in Thin Lizzy, he released his first proper solo album Back on the Streets in 1978. It spawned a hit single, "Parisienne Walkways", which featured Phil Lynott on lead vocals and bass. The song reached number eight on the UK Singles Chart and is considered Moore's signature song. After leaving Thin Lizzy in 1979, Moore moved to Los Angeles where he signed a new recording contract with Jet Records, a British label. He recorded the album Dirty Fingers, which was shelved in favour of the more "radio-oriented" G-Force album. G-Force came out in 1980. Dirty Fingers was eventually released in Japan in 1983, followed by an international release the next year.

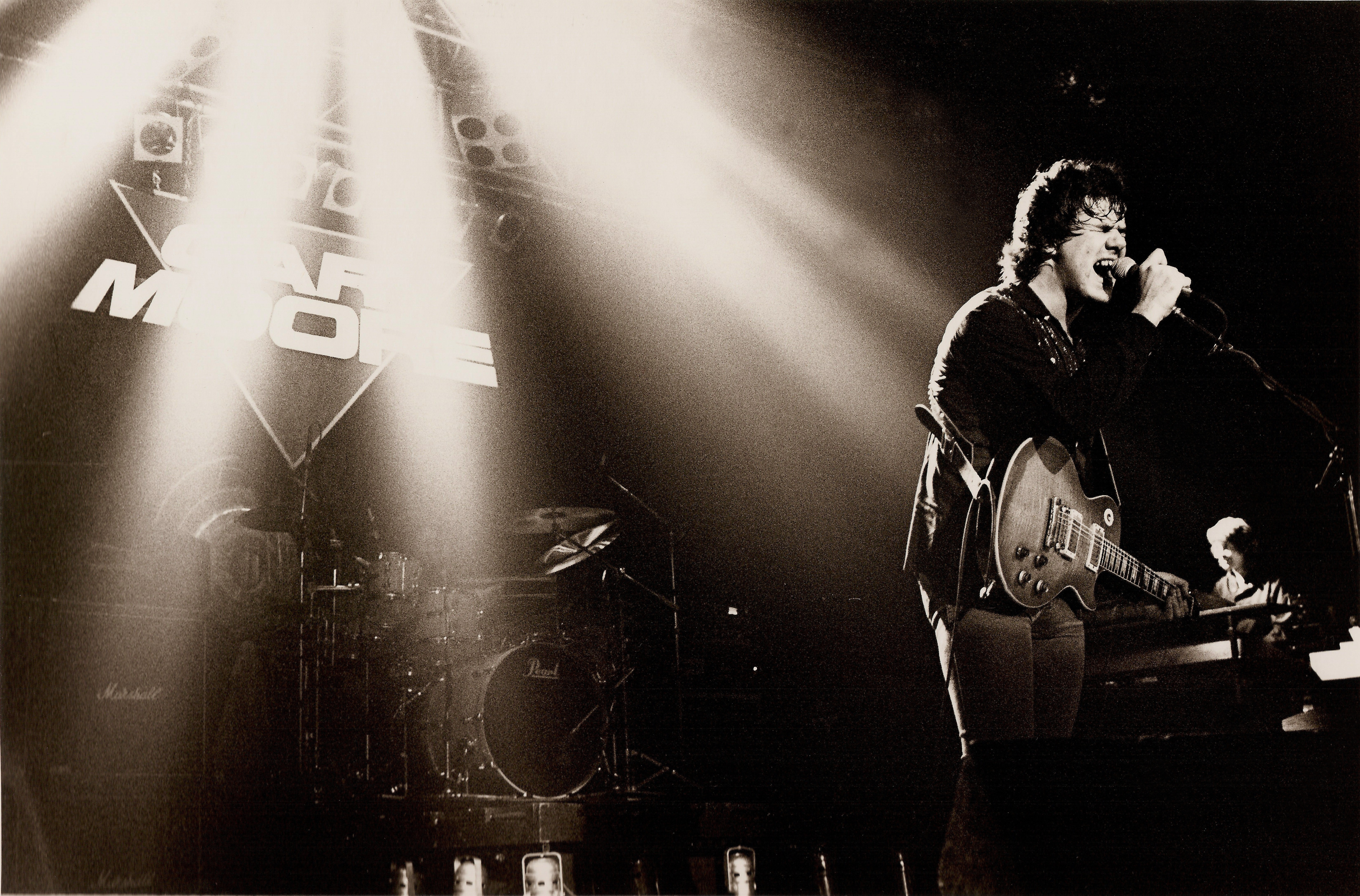
Moore performing at the Manchester Apollo in 1983.

After moving to London and signing a new recording contract with Virgin, Moore released his second solo album Corridors of Power in 1982. While not a major success, it was the first album to feature him on lead vocals throughout as well as his first solo release to crack the Billboard 200 chart. Musically Corridors of Power featured "more of a rock feel", with additional influences from AOR bands such as Journey and REO Speedwagon. The album also featured former Deep Purple drummer Ian Paice, Whitesnake bassist Neil Murray and keyboardist Tommy Eyre, who had previously played with Moore in Greg Lake's backing band. During the supporting tour for Corridors of Power, singer John Sloman was hired to share lead vocal duties with Moore and Eyre was replaced by Don Airey. In 1984, Moore released the album Victims of the Future, which marked another musical change, this time towards hard rock and heavy metal. Neil Carter was added for the album and he continued to push Moore in the new musical direction. For the supporting tour, they were joined by former Rainbow bassist Craig Gruber and drummer Bobby Chouinard, who were later replaced by Ozzy Osbourne bassist Bob Daisley and former Roxy Music drummer Paul Thompson, respectively.

In 1985, Moore released his fifth solo album Run for Cover, which featured guest vocals by Phil Lynott and Glenn Hughes. Moore and Lynott performed the hit single "Out in the Fields", which reached the top five in both Ireland and the UK. On the back of its success, Run for Cover achieved gold certification in Sweden, as well as silver in the UK. For the album's supporting tour, Paul Thompson was replaced by drummer Gary Ferguson. Hughes was supposed to join the band on bass, but due to his substance abuse problems, he was replaced by Bob Daisley. After Lynott's death, Moore dedicated his sixth solo album, 1987's Wild Frontier to him. A blend of Celtic folk music, blues and rock, the album was another success, being certified platinum in Sweden, gold in Finland and Norway, as well as silver in the UK. The album had a hit single "Over the Hills and Far Away", which charted in nine countries.

For the accompanying tour, former Black Sabbath drummer Eric Singer joined Moore's backing band. Wild Frontier was followed up by 1989's After the War, which featured drummer Cozy Powell. However, he was replaced by Chris Slade for the supporting tour. While After the War achieved gold status in Germany and Sweden, as well as silver in the UK, Moore had grown tired of his own music. He told former Thin Lizzy guitarist Eric Bell that after listening to some of his own albums, he thought they were "the biggest load of fucking shite" he had ever heard. In his own words, Moore had lost his "musical self‑respect".

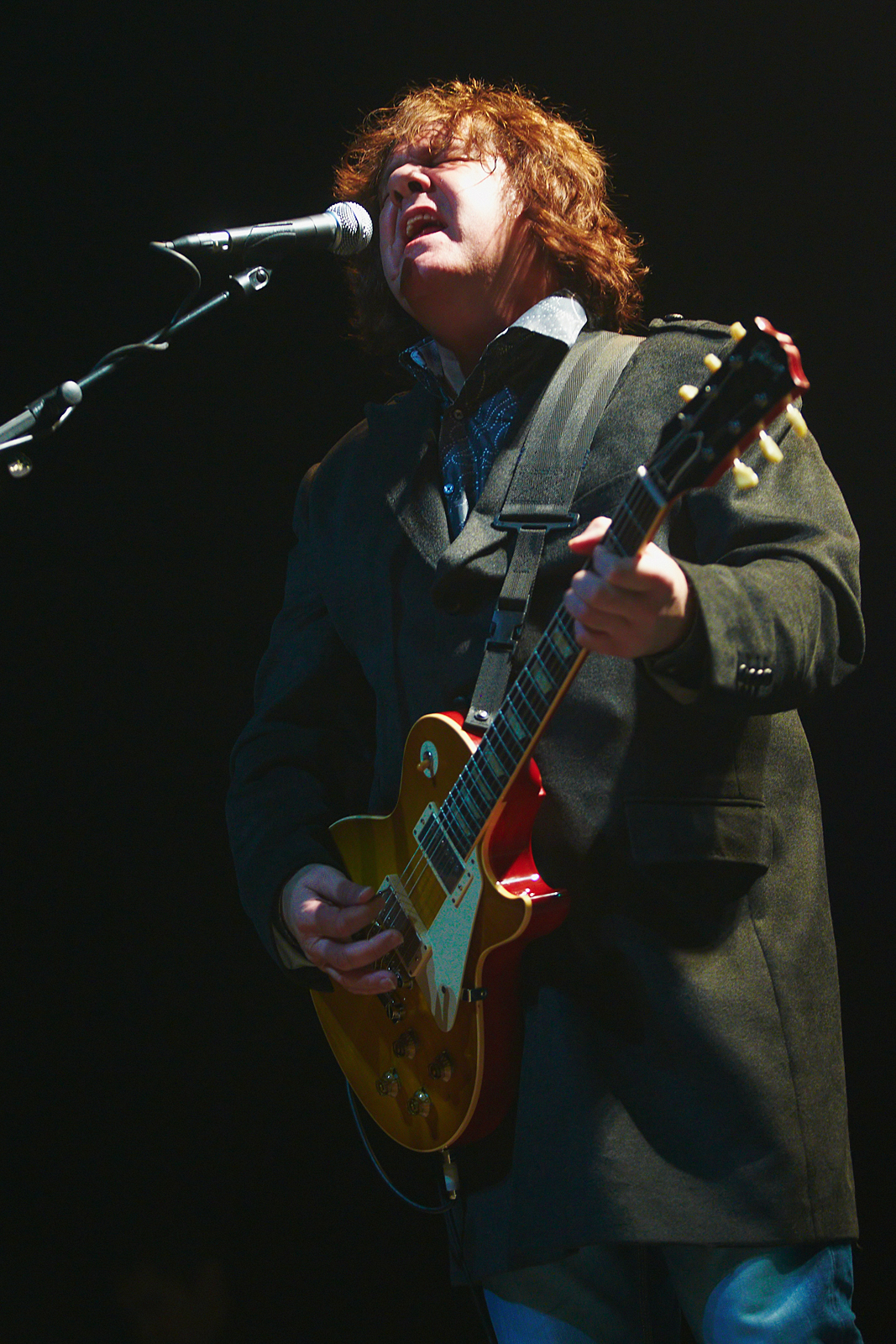
Moore performing on tour in 2010.

In 1990, Moore released the album Still Got the Blues, a return to his blues roots and collaborating with Albert King, Albert Collins and George Harrison. The idea for the record came up during the supporting tour for After the War–Moore often played the blues by himself in the dressing room and one night Bob Daisley jokingly suggested that he do a whole blues album. The change in musical style was also underlined by a change in Moore's wardrobe. He sported a smart blue suit for videos and live performances instead of being "all dolled up like some guy in Def Leppard". This was a conscious decision by Moore to attract new listeners, and he informed his old audience that "this was something new". In the end, Still Got the Blues became the most successful album of Moore's career, selling over three million copies worldwide. The album's title track also became the only single of his solo career to chart on the Billboard Hot 100; it reached number 97 in February 1991. For the album's supporting tour, Moore assembled a new backing band dubbed The Midnight Blues Band; it featured Andy Pyle, Graham Walker and Don Airey as well as a horn section.

Still Got the Blues was followed by 1992's After Hours, which went platinum in Sweden and gold in the UK. The record also became Moore's highest-charting album in the UK where it reached number four. In 1995, Moore released Blues for Greeny, a tribute album to his friend and mentor Peter Green. After experimenting with electronic music on Dark Days in Paradise (1997) and A Different Beat (1999), Moore once again returned to his blues roots with 2001's Back to the Blues. Power of the Blues (2004) followed, in addition to Old New Ballads Blues (2006), Close as You Get (2007) and finally Bad for You Baby (2008). Prior to his death, he was working on a new Celtic rock album which was left unfinished. Some of the songs later appeared on the live album Live at Montreux 2010. Additional unreleased recordings of Moore's were released on the album How Blue Can You Get in 2021.

=== Other work ===
In 1975, Moore joined progressive jazz fusion group Colosseum II, which was formed after the demise of bandleader Jon Hiseman's previous band Colosseum. Moore recorded three albums with the group, before leaving to join Thin Lizzy in 1978. While living in Los Angeles in 1979, Moore formed the band G-Force with Glenn Hughes and Mark Nauseef. However, Hughes was soon fired due to his problems with substance abuse. The band then recruited singer Willie Dee and bassist Tony Newton. At the same time, Moore was also being courted to join Ozzy Osbourne's band. He declined and G-Force helped Osbourne audition other musicians for Osbourne's band. G-Force released their self-titled debut album in 1980 and toured opening for Whitesnake. Before the end of the year, however, the band broke up.

After G-Force, Moore was recruited to play guitar in Greg Lake's solo band. They recorded two studio albums together, 1981's Greg Lake and 1983's Manoeuvres, as well as the live album King Biscuit Flower Hour Presents Greg Lake in Concert, which was released in 1995. In 1982, Moore was considered for the guitarist position in Whitesnake, but vocalist David Coverdale opted not to recruit Moore as the band was in the process of severing ties with their management. In 1987, Moore collaborated on the UK charity record "Let It Be", which was released under the group name Ferry Aid. From 1993 to 1994, he was a member of the short-lived power trio BBM ("Baker Bruce Moore"), which also featured Jack Bruce and Ginger Baker, both formerly of Cream. After just one album and a European tour, the trio disbanded. The project was marred by personality clashes between members as well as "ear problems" which Moore sustained during the tour. He later said of the band's break-up: "There were a lot of things within the band that would have made it impossible, long term. I think that politically Jack [Bruce] was used to having his own band, I was used to having my own band and so it was very difficult." In 2002, Moore collaborated with former Skunk Anansie bassist Cass Lewis and Primal Scream drummer Darrin Mooney in Scars, which released one album. Moore performed on the One World Project charity single "Grief Never Grows Old", which was released in 2005.

Over the course of his career, Moore played with many more artists including George Harrison, Dr. Strangely Strange, Andrew Lloyd Webber, Rod Argent, Gary Boyle, B.B. King, The Traveling Wilburys and The Beach Boys.

== Personal life ==
In the mid-1970s, Moore was involved in a bar fight leaving him with facial scars. According to Eric Bell, Moore was with his girlfriend at Dingwalls in Camden which is part of inner London, when two men "started mouthing about Gary's girlfriend [...] what they'd like to do to her". After Moore confronted them about it, one of the men smashed a bottle on the bar and slashed Moore's face with it. It had a profound effect on him. Bell said, "It did change him. A lot of that pent-up anger and emotion would come out in his playing... it came out in other ways too. It must be a hard thing to come back from something like that." During the 1980s, Moore hid his scars in photographs and videos by looking down or being framed in photographs from a distance.

Moore was married to his first wife Kerry from 1985 to 1993. Before divorcing, they had two sons, Jack (who became a musician) and Gus. Gary later had a daughter, Lily (who also embarked on a musical career), during a relationship with Jo Rendle. Moore also had a daughter named Saoirse from another relationship. At the time of his death, he was in a relationship.

== Death ==
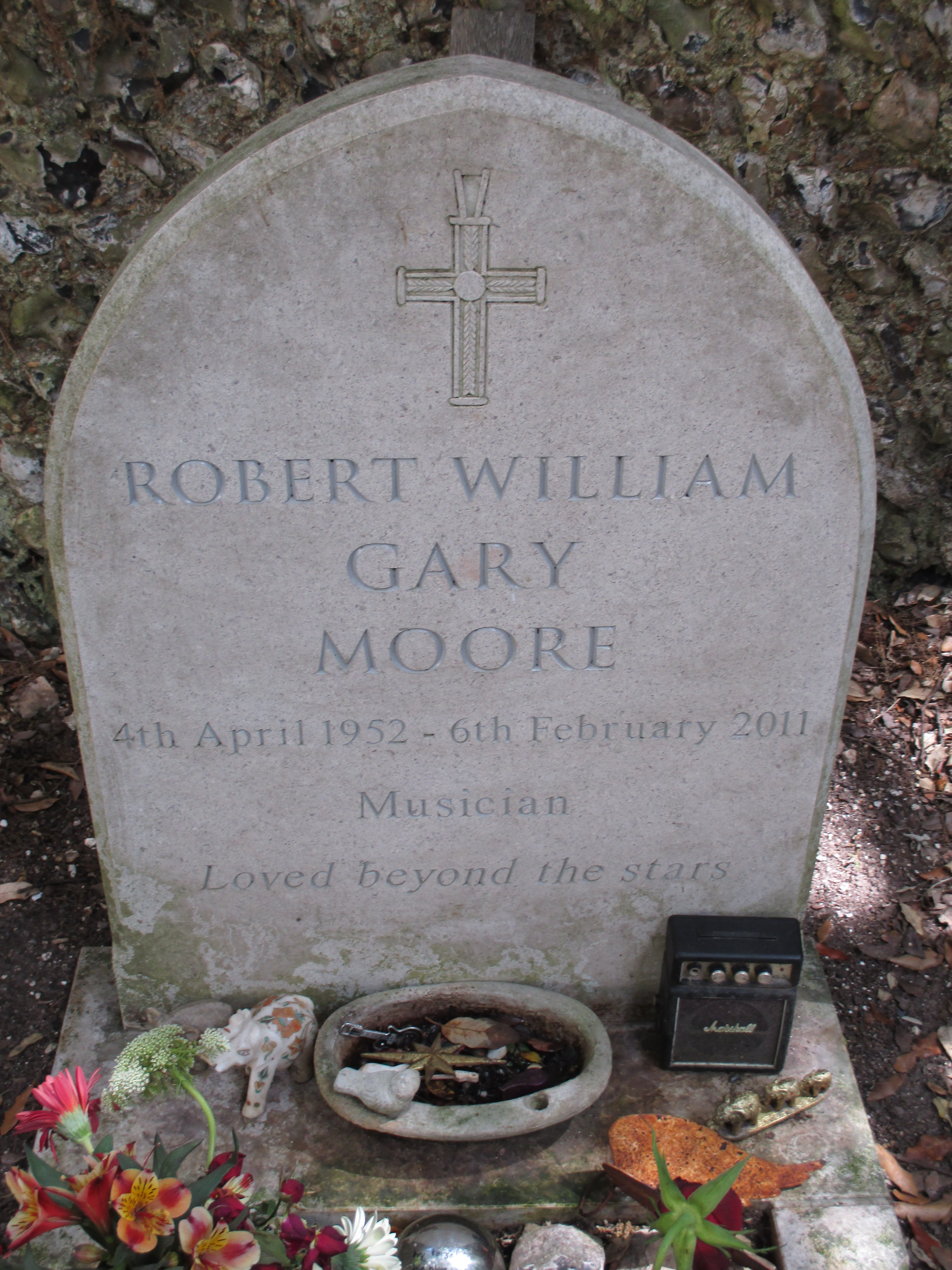
Moore's gravestone in Rottingdean, England

During the early hours of 6 February 2011, Moore died of a heart attack in his sleep at the age of 58. At the time he was on holiday with his girlfriend at the Kempinski Hotel in Estepona, a town in Andalusia, Spain. His death was confirmed by Thin Lizzy's manager Adam Parsons. The Daily Telegraph reported that his heart attack was brought on by a blood alcohol level of 0.38%, whereas a level of 0.40% is generally considered lethal and 0.08% is considered legally drunk. According to Mick Wall, a music journalist, Moore had developed a serious drinking problem during the last years of his life.

Moore was buried in a private ceremony at St Margaret's Churchyard in Rottingdean, near Brighton, with only family and close friends in attendance. His eldest son Jack and his uncle Cliff performed the Irish ballad 'Danny Boy' at his funeral. It was reported in The Belfast Telegraph as "a flawless tribute at which some mourners in the church wept openly".

== Style and influences ==
Moore was known for having an eclectic career having performed blues, hard rock, heavy metal and jazz fusion. At times he was accused of chasing trends which Moore denied; he said that he had always just done what he liked at the time. After Still Got the Blues, Moore distanced himself from his 1980s hard rock image. Although he still enjoyed rock music in general, he no longer identified himself as a rock guitarist, stating: "I'm not that guy anymore, to be honest with you. If I go back and listen to some of that stuff, I go, 'Shit. Did I really play that?' It just sounds quite alien to me in some ways–It's just not the way I want to play." While he was closely associated with and cited as a heavy influence on the guitar "shred" movement of the 1980s, Moore himself was highly critical of many of its proponents, describing many of the artists associated with the Guitar Institute of Technology and Shrapnel Records as being part of a "conveyor belt production line of guitarists who haven't a lot to say for themselves". Many of his songs were autobiographical or they dealt with topics important to him.

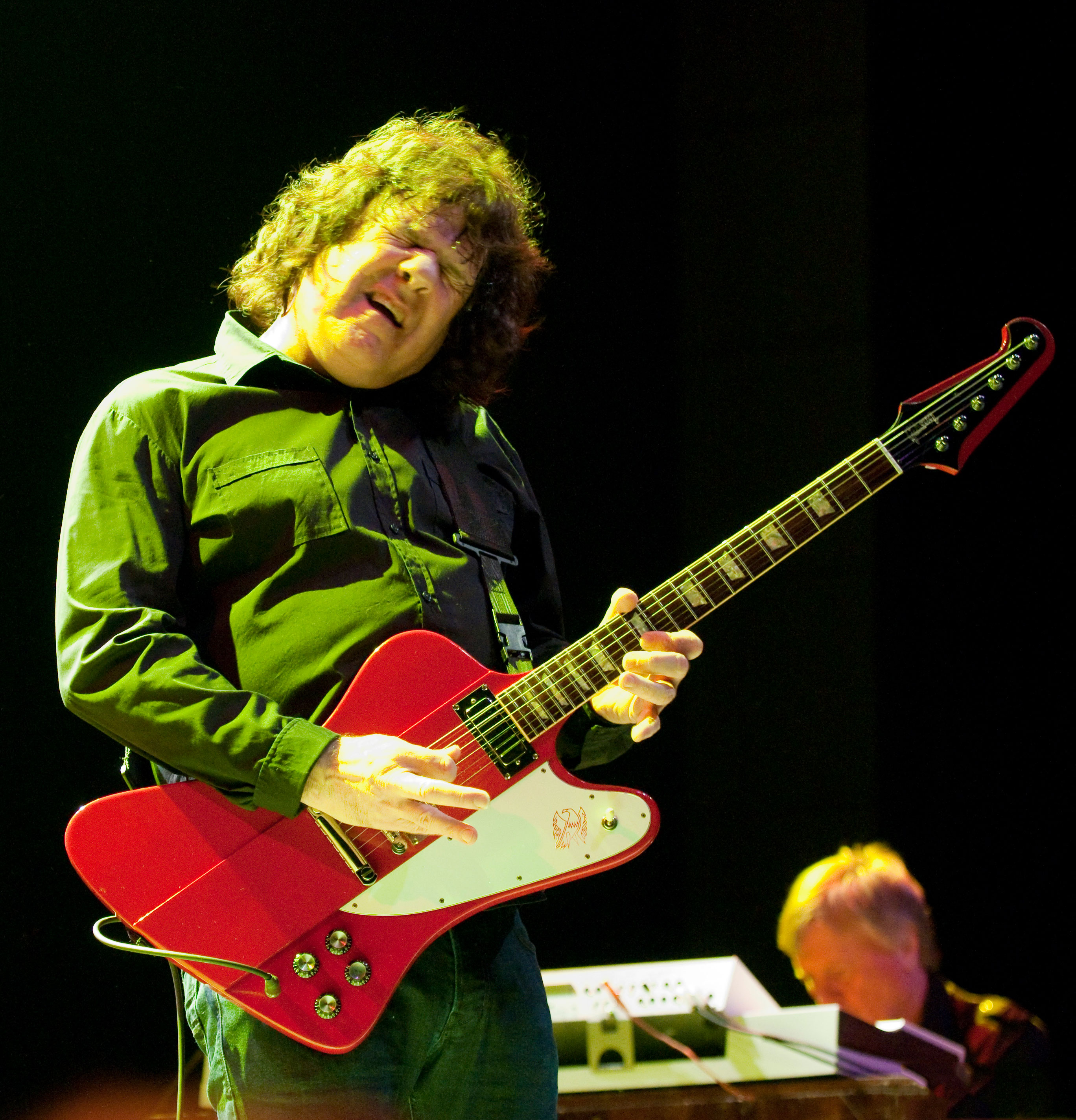
Moore was known for his pained expressions during live performances.

One of Moore's biggest influences was guitarist Peter Green. The first time Moore heard Green play was at a performance with John Mayall & the Bluesbreakers. Describing the show Moore said, "It was an amazing experience just to hear a guitarist walk on stage and plug into this amplifier, which I thought was a pile of shit, and get this incredible sound. He was absolutely fantastic, everything about him was so graceful." Moore eventually met Green in January 1970 when Skid Row toured with Green's band Fleetwood Mac. The two became friends and Green later sold his 1959 Gibson Les Paul (nicknamed "Greeny") to Moore. Another major influence of Moore's was Eric Clapton, whom he first heard on the John Mayall & The Bluesbreakers album Blues Breakers with Eric Clapton. To Moore it was a life-changing experience, "Within two seconds of the opening track, I was blown away. The guitar sound itself was so different. You could hear the blues in it, but prior to that all the guitar you heard in rock, well pop, music had been very staid, very polite. Just listen to the early Beatles and The Shadows to see what I mean. They were great, but Eric Clapton transcended it completely." Some of Moore's other early influences were Jeff Beck, George Harrison, Jimi Hendrix, Hank Marvin, John Mayall and Mick Taylor. He also cited Albert King and B.B. King as being influential to his performances.

Moore has been described as a virtuoso by numerous publications. Don Airey described him as a genius, while guitarist Bernie Marsden said that "Gary could play literally any style". Moore was known for his melodic sensibilities as well as his aggressive vibrato. During the 1980s, he often used major or natural minor scales and in the second half of his career, his playing was characterised by his use of pentatonic and blues scales. For more melodic leads, he often used the guitar's neck pickup, while the bridge pickup was used to achieve a more aggressive sound. Regarding his style of playing, Moore said the best piece of advice he ever received came from Albert King, who taught him the value of leaving space. Moore said, "When you get into the habit of leaving a space, you become a much better player for it. If you've got an expressive style and can express your emotions through your guitar, and you've got a great tone, it creates a lot of tension for the audience. It's all down to the feel thing. If you've got a feel for the blues, that's a big part of it. But you've got to leave that space." He was also known for having pained expressions while performing, something he said was not a conscious action. When asked about it he said, "When I'm playing I get completely lost in it and I'm not even aware of what I'm doing with my face—I'm just playing."

Moore was often described as "grumpy" and he had a reputation of being hard to work with. Brian Downey described him as "cranky" at times, while Eric Bell recalled a particular incident after a concert in Dublin: "I went to see him in the dressing room afterwards. — I sat down beside him and said, 'Fucking great gig, Gary.' He looked at me. 'What? Fucking load of shite! I've never played so bad in my fucking life!' I saw that side of him quite a lot." It was echoed by Downey who said that if a show was not perfect, it would torment Moore. While Moore acknowledged his reputation of being difficult to work with at times, he attributed that to his own perfectionism holding others up to the same standards he set for himself. Don Airey later said that Moore's perfectionism was often to his own detriment.

== Legacy ==
"I don't know. However they want! As somebody that didn't bullshit. Whatever I did, at least I meant it. That's all I can say really 'cos I usually do mean it. I'm not full of shit like a lot of people. Whatever I do, whether it sells or not, at least I mean it at the time and I'm honest about it. Which I think is the only way to be."

— Gary Moore on how he'd like to be remembered.

After his death, many of Moore's fellow musicians paid tribute to him including his former Thin Lizzy bandmates Brian Downey, and Scott Gorham, as well as Bryan Adams, Bob Geldof, Kirk Hammett, Tony Iommi, Alex Lifeson, Brian May, Ozzy Osbourne, Paul Rodgers, Henry Rollins, Roger Taylor, Butch Walker, and Mikael Åkerfeldt amongst many others. Thin Lizzy also dedicated the rest of their ongoing tour to Moore. Eric Clapton performed "Still Got the Blues" in concert as a tribute to Moore, and the song was featured later on Clapton's 2013 album Old Sock. On 12 March 2011, a tribute night was held for Moore at Duff's Brooklyn in New York City. On 18 April 2011, Eric Bell, Brian Downey and a number of performers gathered for a tribute concert at Whelan's in Dublin.

In 2012, an exhibition celebrating the life and work of Moore was held at the Oh Yeah Music Centre in Belfast. To commemorate what would have been his father's 65th birthday, Jack Moore along with guitarist Danny Young released the tribute song "Phoenix" in 2017. That same year, guitarist Henrik Freischlader released a tribute album to Moore, titled Blues for Gary. In 2018, Bob Daisley released the album Moore Blues for Gary – A Tribute to Gary Moore, which featured the likes of Glenn Hughes, Steve Lukather, Steve Morse, Joe Lynn Turner and Ricky Warwick. On 12 April 2019, a tribute concert for Moore was held at The Belfast Empire Music Hall to help raise funds for a memorial statue. Plans for the statue were approved by the Belfast City Council in January 2025.

Moore has been cited as an influence by many notable guitarists including Doug Aldrich, Joe Bonamassa, Vivian Campbell, Paul Gilbert, Kirk Hammett, Lee Malia, John Norum, John Petrucci, Randy Rhoads, John Sykes, and Zakk Wylde. In 2018, Moore was voted number 15 on Louder's list of "The 50 Best Guitarists of All Time". In 2020, he was named on a list of "The 100 Greatest Guitarists of All Time" by Total Guitar. Classic Rock included him in their 2021 list of "The 100 Most Influential Guitar Heroes".

Gary Moore's official biography, written by Harry Shapiro and authorised by Moore's estate, was released on 27 September 2022.

== Equipment ==
=== Guitars ===
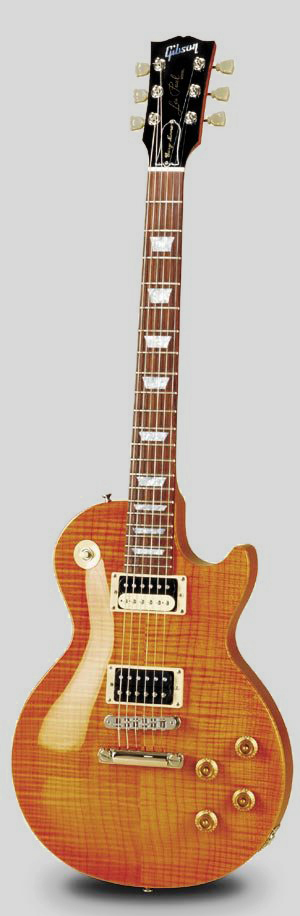
Gibson Gary Moore Signature Les Paul

The guitar most associated with Moore was a 1959 Gibson Les Paul, which was sold to him by Peter Green for around £100. The guitar is nicknamed "Greeny" and is known for its unusual tone, the result of a reversed neck pickup. Moore used the guitar for most of his career (most notably on "Parisienne Walkways"), until he sold it in 2006 for $750,000 to $1.2 million. In a 2007 interview for Vintage Guitar magazine, he talked about having to sell the guitar: "I didn't want to sell it–I had to sell it for various reasons, but mainly because I injured my hand a few years ago and the insurance didn't pay up. I canceled shows and had to cover tour costs with my own money, and didn't get paid for any of the shows. I ended up with debt. So it was a financial thing, and that was the quickest way to do anything about it. I mean, why would I want to sell it? That guitar was played by Jimi Hendrix and Jeff Beck. Rory Gallagher played it, I played it… It was a very special instrument." The guitar was purchased by Metallica guitarist Kirk Hammett in 2014 for less than half a million dollars.

On Still Got the Blues, Moore used another 1959 Gibson Les Paul Standard, nicknamed "Stripe", which he bought in 1989. Apart from fitting bigger fretwires and Grover tuners, the guitar was completely stock standard with original pickups and electronics. Moore used it extensively throughout the remainder of his career and by the 2000s was his "main guitar". The guitar was retained by Moore's estate following his death.

In 2000–2001, Gibson released a Gary Moore Signature Les Paul Standard with a faded lemonburst finish and a reversed neck pickup. Gibson later released a Gary Moore Signature BFG Les Paul, featuring a P-90 pickup in the neck position. In 2013, Gibson announced a new Gary Moore Signature Les Paul, modelled after the "Greeny" guitar. On Corridors of Power and Victims of the Future, Moore used a 1961 Fiesta Red Fender Stratocaster, which had previously belonged to Tommy Steele. In 2017, Fender Custom Shop released a limited edition replica of the guitar. During the 1980s, Moore also played Hamer and PRS guitars, Charvels equipped with Floyd Rose tremolos and EMG pickups, as well as a Heritage guitar which featured on his 1989 After the War album and was reportedly the prototype for a subsequent signature model.

Other guitars Moore used during his career include a 1964 Gibson ES-335 and a 1968 Fender Telecaster. After his death, several of his guitars were auctioned off including a 1963 Fender Stratocaster given to him by Claude Nobs, a Fritz Brothers Roy Buchanan Bluesmaster, a 2011 Gibson Les Paul Standard VOS Collector's Choice No. 1 Artist's Proof No. 3 (modelled after the "Greeny" guitar) and a 1964 Gibson Firebird 1. Moore began playing with .009-.046 gauge strings, before switching to .010-.052. Later he switched to gauge .009-.048. His preferred brand of strings was Dean Markley. He also used extra-heavy picks.

=== Other equipment ===
Moore used Marshall amplifiers during most of his career. He utilised other brands from time to time as well including Dean Markley, Gallien-Krueger and Fender. On Still Got the Blues, Moore used a Soldano SLO-100 amplifier, which was purchased by Joe Bonamassa in 2025. Some of the effects pedals he used during the 1980s included a Boss DS-1, an Ibanez ST-9 Super Tube Screamer, a Roland Space Echo, a Roland SDE 3000 Digital Delay and a Roland Dimension D. Later he used a variety of effects by T-Rex, an Ibanez TS-10 Tube Screamer Classic and a Marshall Guv'nor; the last one was featured most notably on "Still Got the Blues". In the studio, he used an Alesis Midiverb II since the late 1980s. He was an early adopter of the pedalboard, namely the Boss BCB-6 "Carrying Box", which he used in the early 1980s.

== Discography ==
=== Solo albums ===
- Back on the Streets (1978)
- Corridors of Power (1982)
- Dirty Fingers (1983)
- Victims of the Future (1984)
- Run for Cover (1985)
- Wild Frontier (1987)
- After the War (1989)
- Still Got the Blues (1990)
- After Hours (1992)
- Blues for Greeny (1995)
- Dark Days in Paradise (1997)
- A Different Beat (1999)
- Back to the Blues (2001)
- Power of the Blues (2004)
- Old New Ballads Blues (2006)
- Close as You Get (2007)
- Bad for You Baby (2008)
- How Blue Can You Get (2021)
