= Monument of Metal =

Compilation album by Anvil
- Released: September 27, 2011
- Genre: Heavy metal, speed metal
- Length: 78:42
- Label: The End Records

Anvil chronology
Juggernaut of Justice (2011)	Monument of Metal (2011)	Hope in Hell (2013)

Monument of Metal is a 2011 compilation album by Canadian heavy metal band Anvil.

== Album artwork ==
The artwork for this compilation album features an enormous statue of an anvil in a park courtyard bordered with Canadian flags. Inside the courtyard can be seen tiny silhouettes of people, which helps give the actual monument its scale. The concept was taken from an original painting done by drummer, Robb Reiner, the only real difference being that the album cover features a very warm cloud laced sky where the original featured a clear blue sky. The original artwork can be seen hanging in Reiner's basement on the 2008 rock documentary Anvil! The Story of Anvil.

== Track listing ==
No.	Title	From the album	Length
1.	"Metal on Metal (2009)"	Metal on Metal, re-recorded from This Is Thirteen	4:07
2.	"Winged Assassins (2009)"	Forged in Fire, re-recorded	4:01
3.	"666 (2009)"	Metal on Metal, re-recorded from This Is Thirteen	4:43
4.	"Thumb Hang"	This Is Thirteen	6:00
5.	"School Love (2009)"	Hard 'n' Heavy, re-recorded	3:25
6.	"Heat Sink"	Metal on Metal	3:57
7.	"March of the Crabs" (instrumental)	Metal on Metal	2:35
8.	"Plenty of Power"	Plenty of Power	4:03
9.	"Mothra"	Metal on Metal	5:07
10.	"Sins of the Flesh"	Worth the Weight	5:21
11.	"Jackhammer" (live)	Past and Present	3:54
12.	"Juggernaut of Justice"	Juggernaut of Justice	3:40
13.	"No One to Follow"	Absolutely No Alternative	4:43
14.	"Mad Dog"	Strength of Steel	3:12
15.	"Bottom Feeder"	Back to Basics	2:59
16.	"Race Against Time"	Still Going Strong	4:37
17.	"American Refugee"	This Is Thirteen	2:38
18.	"Fire in the Night"	Pound for Pound	6:09
19.	"Park That Truck"	Speed of Sound	3:32
Total length:			78:42

== Personnel ==
- Lips – vocals & guitar (all tracks)
- Robb Reiner – drums (all tracks)
- Ivan Hurd – guitar (tracks 8, 13, 15, 16)
- Glenn Gyorffy – bass (tracks 1, 2, 3, 4, 5, 12, 13, 15, 16, 17, 19)
- Dave "Squirrely" Allison – guitar (tracks 6, 7, 9, 11, 14, 18)
- Ian "Dix" Dickson – bass (tracks 6, 7, 9, 10, 11, 14, 18)
- Sebastian Marino – guitar (track 10)
