= Anthology (Anvil album) =

Anthology of Anvil

Compilation album by Anvil
- Released: November 21, 2000
- Genres: Heavy metal, speed metal
- Length: 76:28
- Label: Metal Blade

Anvil chronology
Speed of Sound (1999)	Anthology of Anvil (2000)	Plenty of Power (2001)

Professional ratings
Review scores
Source	Rating
AllMusic	4.5/5 stars
Collector's Guide to Heavy Metal	8/10

Anthology of Anvil is a compilation album by Canadian heavy metal band Anvil.

== Track listing ==
No.	Title	From the album	Length
1.	"Metal on Metal"	Metal on Metal (1982)	3:43
2.	"Smokin' Green"	Plugged in Permanent (1996)	3:39
3.	"Winged Assassins"	Forged in Fire (1983)	3:54
4.	"Free as the Wind"	Forged in Fire	2:35
5.	"Old School"	Absolutely No Alternative (1997)	6:00
6.	"Bushpig"	Worth the Weight (1992)	5:19
7.	"Blood on the Ice"	Pound for Pound (1988)	4:05
8.	"March of the Crabs"	Metal on Metal	4:05
9.	"Jackhammer"	Metal on Metal	3:32
10.	"Speed of Sound"	Speed of Sound (1999)	3:32
11.	"666"	Metal on Metal	3:32
12.	"Stolen"	Plugged in Permanent	3:32
13.	"Paper General"	Strength of Steel (1987)	3:32
14.	"Forged in Fire" (live)	Past and Present – Live in Concert (1989)	5:19
15.	"School Love"	Hard 'n' Heavy (1981)	3:15
16.	"Motormount"	Forged in Fire	3:39
17.	"Doctor Kevorkian"	Plugged in Permanent	3:47
18.	"Mothra"	Metal on Metal	5:07

== Personnel ==
- Steve "Lips" Kudlow – vocals, guitar (all tracks)
- Ivan Hurd – guitar (tracks 2, 5, 10 & 17)
- Glenn Gyorffy – bass (tracks 5 & 10)
- Robb Reiner – drums (all tracks)
- Dave "Squirrely" Allison – guitar (tracks 1, 3, 4, 7, 8, 9, 11, 13, 14, 15, 16 & 18)
- Ian "Dix" Dickson – bass (tracks 1, 3, 4, 6, 7, 8, 9, 11, 13, 14, 15, 16 & 18)
- Sebastian Marino – guitar (track 6)
- Mike Duncan – bass (tracks 2 & 17)
