= Backwaxed =

Compilation album by Anvil
- Released: 22 April 1985
- Genre: Heavy metal, speed metal
- Length: 37:06
- Label: Viper/Attic
- Producer: Chris Tsangarides, Anvil
- Compiler: Ralph Alonso

Anvil chronology
Forged in Fire (1983)	Backwaxed (1985)	Strength of Steel (1987)

Professional ratings
Review scores
Source	Rating
AllMusic	3/5 stars
Collector's Guide to Heavy Metal	6/10
Rock Hard	8.0/10

Backwaxed is a compilation album by the Canadian heavy metal band Anvil. It is a compilation which features five unreleased tracks recorded during sessions for previous albums on side one, and five previously released tracks on side two. It is Anvil's only album with a main title not consisting of three words with the first and third words starting with the same letter.

== Track listing ==
Side one
No.	Title	Writer(s)	Length
1.	"Pussy Poison" (instrumental, recorded December 1983 at Quest Recording Studios, Oshawa, Canada)	Robb Reiner, Steve "Lips" Kudlow	2:42
2.	"Backwaxed" (recorded January 1983 at Phase One Studios, Toronto, Ontario, Canada)	Anvil	3:49
3.	"Steamin'" (recorded October 1981 at Phase One Studios)	Reiner, Kudlow	3:39
4.	"You're a Liar" (recorded October 1981 at Phase One Studios)	Dave Allison, Kudlow	4:56
5.	"Fryin' Cryin'" (recorded October 1981 at Phase One Studios)	Reiner, Kudlow	3:08

Side two
No.	Title	Writer(s)	From the album	Length
6.	"Metal on Metal"	Anvil	Metal on Metal (1982)	3:58
7.	"Butter-Bust Jerky"	Anvil	Forged in Fire (1983)	3:20
8.	"Scenery"	Anvil	Metal on Metal	4:44
9.	"Jackhammer"	Anvil	Metal on Metal	3:34
10.	"School Love"	Reiner, Kudlow	Hard 'n' Heavy (1981)	3:16

== Personnel ==
Anvil

- Steve "Lips" Kudlow – vocals, guitar
- Dave Allison – guitar, vocals on "You're a Liar"
- Ian Dickson – bass guitar
- Robb Reiner – drums

Production

- Chris Tsangarides – producer, engineer and mixing on tracks 2, 6–9
- Anvil – producer on tracks 1, 3–5, 10
- Ralph Alonso – compiler
