= Hope in Hell =

Studio album by Anvil
- Released: May 24, 2013
- Studio: NRG Recording Studios and The Blue Room Studios, Los Angeles
- Genre: Heavy metal
- Length: 53:20
- Label: Anvil Enterprises (Canada); The End Records (US); SPV/Steamhammer (Germany); Rubicon Music (Japan)
- Producer: Bob Marlette

Anvil chronology
| Monument of Metal (2011) | Hope in Hell (2013) | Anvil Is Anvil (2016) |

Hope in Hell is the fifteenth studio album by Canadian heavy metal band Anvil. It was released in 2013 on May 24 in Germany, May 27 in the rest of Europe, and May 28 in North America. The album was produced by Bob Marlette, who, according to frontman Steve "Lips" Kudlow, contributed a lot to songwriting and arrangements with his skills. All songwriting credits went to Lips and Robb Reiner alone. In some songs, Lips was inspired by his love of "heavy rock 'n' roll", which made him feel he "found his way home" to the time when they did their first record, Hard 'n' Heavy. It is the only Anvil album to feature bassist Sal Italiano.

== Release and reception ==
Professional ratings
Aggregate scores
| Source | Rating |
|---|---|
| Metacritic | 47/100 |
Review scores
| Source | Rating |
| AllMusic | 3/5 stars |
| Jukebox: Metal | 3.5/5 stars |
| Metal Hammer (GER) | 6/7 |
| Rock Hard | 8.0/10 |

The album sold just under 800 copies in the first week of its release in the United States. It has received mostly lukewarm reception from fans.

== Track listing ==
All tracks are written by Robb Reiner and Lips.

| No. | Title | Length |
|---|---|---|
| 1. | "Hope in Hell" | 4:43 |
| 2. | "Eat Your Words" | 3:41 |
| 3. | "Through with You" | 4:48 |
| 4. | "The Fight Is Never Won" | 4:28 |
| 5. | "Pay the Toll" | 2:48 |
| 6. | "Flying" | 4:50 |
| 7. | "Call of Duty" | 3:53 |
| 8. | "Badass Rock 'n' Roll" | 4:35 |
| 9. | "Time Shows No Mercy" | 4:35 |
| 10. | "Mankind Machine" | 4:13 |
| 11. | "Shut the Fuck Up" | 3:38 |

Bonus tracks on all releases, except the German SPV/Steamhammer CD
| No. | Title | Length |
|---|---|---|
| 12. | "Hard Wired" | 3:08 |
| 13. | "Fire at Will" | 4:03 |
| Total length: | | 53:20 |

Japanese edition bonus track
| No. | Title | Length |
|---|---|---|
| 14. | "Hope in Hell" (live at Wacken) |

== Personnel ==
Anvil

- Steve "Lips" Kudlow – guitars, vocals
- Sal Italiano – bass
- Robb Reiner – drums

Production

- Bob Marlette – production, engineering, mixing
- Chris Marlette – digital editing, engineering
- Kyle Hoffmann – assistant engineering
- Maor Appelbaum – mastering

== Charts ==
| Chart (2013) | Peak position |
|---|---|
| US Heatseekers Albums (Billboard) | 31 |
