= What Do You Know About Rock 'N Roll? =

Studio album by Slave Raider
- Released: November 1988
- Recorded: Summer 1988, Battery Studios, London
- Genre: Hard rock
- Length: 45:39
- Label: Jive
- Producer: Chris Tsangarides

Slave Raider chronology
| Take the World by Storm (1986) | What Do You Know About Rock 'N Roll? (1988) | Bigger, Badder, & Bolder (1990) |

Singles from What Do You Know About Rock 'N Roll?
- 1. "Youngblood" Released: 1988

What Do You Know About Rock 'N Roll? is the second studio album by Minneapolis hard rock band Slave Raider, released in the winter of 1988. It was the band's first album to be recorded for a major label. Despite snowballing success from a notoriously successful show at London's Marquee club, the album had little commercial success outside of the band's dedicated fan base.

== Overview ==
After an extensive tour of London, the group joined Tsangarides to record their sophomore effort. According to guitar player Nicci Wikkid, the band was impressed with Tsangarides' production skills, but felt that he was not interested in the band. The second side is a loose rock opera about a totalitarian society in which rock and roll has been banned. "The High Priest of Good Times" is persecuted for playing it, and sent to a prison known as the "Iron Bar Motel". Because of poor promotion by their record label, the album was unsuccessful. This led to the departure of original members Nicci Wikkid and Letitia Rae. The band was dropped soon after, coming together one more time for their independently released third album Bigger, Badder, & Bolder with a revamped lineup.

Lead singer Chainsaw Caine viewed the album as a progression from their debut in both technical proficiency and songwriting. Metal Forces and Kerrang! writers shared this point of view, giving positive reviews of the album and the group's stage antics, particularly their show at the Marquee. The rock opera section of the album was partially written in response to the PMRC, even though Caine stated in an interview with Kerrang! that he did not see the PMRC having any staying power.

== Reception ==
Professional ratings
Review scores
| Source | Rating |
|---|---|
| AllMusic | 1.5/5 stars |
| Kerrang! | (favourable) |
| Metal Forces | (positive) |

Kerrang! was very positive of the album, as was another reviewer from Metal Forces, but an Allmusic retrospective review gave the album very negative reception. According to Metal Forces, reviews for the album were very mixed depending on if the reviewer was willing to look past the band's image.

== Track listing ==
Side one
| No. | Title | Music | Length |
|---|---|---|---|
| 1. | "Is There Rock 'N Roll In Heaven?" | Chainsaw Caine, Lance Sabin | 3:50 |
| 2. | "Youngblood" | Nicci Wikkid, Caine, Nagel | 4:29 |
| 3. | "Bye Bye Baby" | Wikkid, Caine | 4:08 |
| 4. | "Keep on Pushin'" | Sabin, Caine | 4:15 |
| 5. | "Sin City Social" | Wikkid, Caine | 3:11 |
| 6. | "Roller Coaster" | Caine, Wikkid | 3:48 |
| 7. | "The High Priest of Good Times" | Caine, Sabin | 2:36 |

Side two
| No. | Title | Music | Length |
|---|---|---|---|
| 8. | "The Magistrate" | | 0:54 |
| 9. | "What Do You Know About Rock 'N Roll?" | Sabin, Caine | 3:32 |
| 10. | "Guilty" | Caine, Sabin | 3:39 |
| 11. | "Iron Bar Motel" | Caine, Sabin, Rae | 3:26 |
| 12. | "Wreckin' Machine" | Caine, Wikkid | 3:27 |
| 13. | "Jailbreak" (Thin Lizzy cover) | Phil Lynott | 4:23 |

=== 2015 remastered edition ===
In 2015, Divebomb Records re-mastered the first two Slave Raider albums because of their scarce availability on the CD format. The reissue includes extensive liner notes with lyrics, a short biography, and informational clips relevant to the time era of the band. The re-mastered CD has significantly less dynamic range than the original RCA distributed disc.

== Personnel ==
=== Slave Raider ===
- Chainsaw Caine (Mike Findling) – lead vocals
- Lance Sabin – electric and acoustic guitar
- Nicci Wikkid (David Hussman) – electric and acoustic guitar, backing vocals
- Letitia Rae – bass guitar, backing vocals
- The Rock (Michael T Williams) – drums

=== Additional musicians ===
- Don Airey - keyboards

=== Production ===
- Chris Tsangarides – producer, engineer, mixing, arrangements
- Mark Flannery - assistant engineer
- Ian Tregoning - assistant engineer
- Slave Raider - arrangements
- Jamie King - re-mastering at The Basement Studios, Winston-Salem, North Carolina
- Christopher Bissel - photography
- Van Bro - back cover & comic
