= Take the World by Storm =

Take the World By Storm

Studio album by Slave Raider
- Released: 1986, 1988
- Recorded: Metro Studios, Minneapolis August, 1986 & Battery Studios, London December, 1987
- Genre: Glam metal
- Length: 34:01
- Label: Jive
- Producer: Slave Raider, Randy Schwoerer

Slave Raider chronology
Take the World By Storm (1986)	What Do You Know About Rock 'N Roll? (1988)

Take the World by Storm is the debut studio album by the American glam metal band Slave Raider, released independently in 1986. In December 1987, the album was remixed and released to the public in 1988 through the Jive record label, suffering poor sales. The band did have a cult following in Minneapolis. The remixed Make Some Noise was released as a single and a promotional video was shot in The Twin Cities. In the remix, Make Some Noise was cut by around a minute and The Black Hole has a longer introduction. It was available scarcely on CD, cassette, and vinyl and was out of print until Divebomb Records reissued it and the band's sophomore release What Do You Know About Rock 'N Roll? in April 2015.

== Track listing ==
Side One (Original Mix)
No.	Title	Music	Length
1.	"Take the World by Storm"	Chainsaw Caine, Nicci Wikkid	2:54
2.	"Backstabbin"	Caine, Lance Sabin	2:44
3.	"Make Some Noise"	Caine, Nagel, Wikkid	4:38
4.	"Burnin' Too Hot"	Caine, Wikkid, Sabin	3:21
5.	"Long Way from Home"	Caine, Wikkid	2:48

Side Two (Original Mix)
No.	Title	Music	Length
6.	"Survival of the Fittest"	Caine, Wikkid, Letitia Rae, Sabin	6:28
7.	"The Devil Comes Out in Me"	Caine, Sabin	2:56
8.	"The Black Hole"	Caine, Sabin, Hodnick, Wikkid	7:42

Side One (Remixed Edition)
No.	Title	Music	Length
1.	"Take the World by Storm"	Chainsaw Caine, Nicci Wikkid	2:54
2.	"Backstabbin"	Caine, Lance Sabin	2:44
3.	"Make Some Noise"	Caine, Nagel, Wikkid	3:31
4.	"Burnin' Too Hot"	Caine, Wikkid, Sabin	3:15
5.	"Long Way from Home"	Caine, Wikkid	3:00

Side Two (Remixed Edition)
No.	Title	Music	Length
6.	"Survival of the Fittest"		6:44
7.	"The Devil Comes Out in Me"	Caine, Sabin	2:58
8.	"The Black Hole"		8:08

== Staff ==
- Lead vocals - Chainsaw Caine (Mike Findling)
- Bass guitar/backing vocals - Letitia Rae
- Acoustic and electronic percussion - The Rock (Michael T Williams)
- Lead and rhythm guitar - Lance Sabin
- Lead and rhythm guitar/backing vocals - Nicci Wikkid (David Hussman)
- Keyboards - Lee Blaske
- Engineers - Tom Tucker, John Hurst, Kirby Binder
- Assistant engineers - John Hurst, Brad Lobash, Tom Tucker Jr., Tom Herbers, Julie Gardeski
- Remix - Chris Tsangarides
- Remix assistant - Mark Flannery
- Mixing engineer - Tom Tucker
- Front cover photography - Thomas Lowe, Kit Rogers
- Skull illustration - Van Bro
- Album design - John Hanson, MCMG, Van Bro
