= Pounding the Pavement =

Studio album by Anvil
- Released: January 19, 2018
- Studio: Soundlodge Studio, Rhauderfehn, Germany
- Genre: Heavy metal
- Length: 45:23
- Label: Steamhammer
- Producer: Jörg Uken

Anvil chronology
Anvil Is Anvil (2016)	Pounding the Pavement (2018)	Legal at Last (2020)

Professional ratings
Review scores
Source	Rating
AllMusic	3/5 stars
Blabbermouth.net	8/10 stars

Pounding the Pavement is the seventeenth studio album by Canadian heavy metal band Anvil. It was released on January 19, 2018, through Steamhammer.

== Track listing ==
No.	Title	Length
1.	"Bitch in the Box"	4:29
2.	"Ego"	2:57
3.	"Doing What I Want"	3:17
4.	"Smash Your Face"	4:20
5.	"Pounding the Pavement"	3:05
6.	"Rock That Shit"	3:21
7.	"Let It Go"	3:00
8.	"Nanook of the North"	5:57
9.	"Black Smoke"	3:26
10.	"World of Tomorrow"	4:37
11.	"Warming Up"	3:03
12.	"Don't Tell Me" (bonus track except Japan)	3:51
Total length:		45:23

Bonus track (Japanese and Anvil Enterprises editions)
No.	Title	Length
1.	"Spark It Up"

== Personnel ==
=== Musicians ===
- Steve "Lips" Kudlow – vocals, guitars
- Robb Reiner – drums
- Chris "Christ" Robertson – bass, all vocals on 8, 10
