= Frank Gervasi =

American journalist

- Born: 1908; Baltimore, Maryland, US
- Died: January 21, 1990 (age 81); New York City, US
- Education: University of Pennsylvania (BA)
- Spouse(s): Katherine McQuiggan (divorced); Georgia Gibbs
- Children: 1
- Relatives: Sacha Gervasi (grandson)

Frank Gervasi (1908 – January 21, 1990) was an American foreign correspondent and writer.

== Biography ==
Gervasi was born in 1908 in Baltimore, Maryland. He graduated with a B.A. from the University of Pennsylvania. After school, he worked as reporter for The Philadelphia Record and in 1932, he went to work for the Associated Press. In 1934, he worked as a foreign correspondent in Spain where he covered the Spanish Civil War after which he was named the Rome bureau chief for Hearst International before joining Collier's Weekly immediately prior to World War II. He covered the fall of the Netherlands, Belgium, and France to the Nazis and then moved to North Africa with the British Eighth Army and then with the American forces in Southern France. After the war, he worked as a correspondent for The Washington Post, as a syndicated columnist, and as the chief of information for the Marshall Plan in Italy from 1950 to 1954.

He was the author of 10 books including To Whom Palestine?, The Case for Israel, The Real Rockefeller and The Violent Decade.

Gervasi was a co-founder of the Writers and Artists for Peace in the Middle East, a pro-Israel group.

== Personal life ==
Gervasi married twice. His first wife was Katherine McQuiggan with whom he had a son. In 1970, he married Jewish American singer Georgia Gibbs. They had first met in Paris in the 1930s, but lost touch with one another for twelve years. The marriage lasted until his death in 1990. His grandson is screenwriter and film director Sacha Gervasi, who wrote The Terminal for Steven Spielberg and Tom Hanks and directed the documentary Anvil! The Story of Anvil.

Gervasi died at the age of 81 on January 21, 1990, of a stroke in Manhattan.
