= Juggernaut of Justice =

Studio album by Anvil
- Released: May 10, 2011
- Studio: Studio 606 and The Blue Room Studios, Los Angeles
- Genre: Heavy metal, speed metal
- Length: 44:58
- Label: The End Records (US); SPV/Steamhammer (Germany); Avalon (Japan)
- Producer: Bob Marlette

Anvil chronology
This Is Thirteen (2007)	Juggernaut of Justice (2011)	Monument of Metal (2011)

Professional ratings
Review scores
Source	Rating
AllMusic	3/5 stars
Rock Hard	8.5/10

Juggernaut of Justice is the fourteenth studio album by Canadian heavy metal band Anvil. It was recorded at Dave Grohl's Studio 606 in Northridge, Los Angeles, and produced by Bob Marlette. It was released on May 10, 2011. Juggernaut of Justice sold over 1,600 copies in its first week of release in the U.S. It is the final Anvil album to feature bassist Glenn Five.

== Track listing ==
All tracks are written by Anvil

No.	Title	Length
1.	"Juggernaut of Justice"	3:40
2.	"When Hell Breaks Loose"	3:11
3.	"New Orleans Voo Doo"	4:25
4.	"On Fire"	3:23
5.	"Fuken Eh!"	4:08
6.	"Turn It Up"	2:57
7.	"This Ride"	3:12
8.	"Not Afraid"	3:44
9.	"Conspiracy"	3:20
10.	"Running"	2:54
11.	"Paranormal"	7:04
12.	"Swing Thing"	3:00

Bonus tracks
No.	Title	Length
13.	"The Station"	3:24
14.	"Tonight Is Coming"	3:44
15.	"What I Want to Be" (iTunes/Japanese CD bonus track)	3:06

== Personnel ==
Anvil

- Steve "Lips" Kudlow – vocals, lead guitar
- Glenn Five – bass, lead vocals on track 7, backing vocals
- Robb Reiner – drums

Additional musicians

- Lisa Joy Pimentel – horns on track 12

Production

- Bob Marlette – producer, record engineer, mixing
- Clif Norrell – mastering

== Charts ==
Chart (2011)	Peak position
US Heatseekers Albums (Billboard)	12
