= Anvil Is Anvil =

Studio album by Anvil
- Released: February 26, 2016
- Studio: Redhead Studios, Wilhelmshaven, Germany
- Genre: Heavy metal
- Length: 49:20
- Label: SPV/Steamhammer (Europe); Rubicon Music (Japan)
- Producer: Martin "Mattes" Pfeiffer and Anvil

Anvil chronology
Hope in Hell (2013)	Anvil Is Anvil (2016)	Pounding the Pavement (2018)

Professional ratings
Aggregate scores
Source	Rating
Metacritic	68/100
Review scores
Source	Rating
Blabbermouth.net	7/10
Consequence of Sound	B
Metal Hammer (GER)	5/7
TeamRock	3.5/5 stars

Anvil Is Anvil is the sixteenth studio album by Canadian heavy metal band Anvil. It was produced by Martin Pfeiffer and was released on February 26, 2016. It is the first Anvil album to feature bassist Chris Robertson.

== Track listing ==
All tracks are written by Steve "Lips" Kudlow and Robb Reiner except where noted.

No.	Title	Length
1.	"Daggers and Rum"	5:26
2.	"Up, Down, Sideways"	3:19
3.	"Gun Control"	4:22
4.	"Die for a Lie"	3:17
5.	"Runaway Train"	3:40
6.	"Zombie Apocalypse"	4:22
7.	"It's Your Move"	3:30
8.	"Ambushed"	3:22
9.	"Fire on the Highway"	4:35
10.	"Run Like Hell"	3:07
11.	"Forgive, Don't Forget"	2:40

Bonus track
No.	Title	Length
12.	"Never Going to Stop"	4:09

Bonus track (Japanese and Anvil Enterprises editions)
No.	Title	Length
13.	"You Don't Know What It's Like"	3:31

== Personnel ==
Anvil

- Steve "Lips" Kudlow – vocals, guitars
- Chris Robertson – bass, vocals
- Robb "Robbo" Reiner – drums

Production

- Martin "Mattes" Pfeiffer – producer, engineer, mixing
- Holger Thielbörger – editing
- Jacob Hansen – mastering at Hansen Studios, Ribe, Denmark

== Charts ==
Chart (2016)	Peak position
US Heatseekers Albums (Billboard)	16
