= Can't Catch Me =

Can't Catch Me may refer to:

- "Can't Catch Me", song by Anvil from Back to Basics
- "Can't Catch Me", song by Avicii from Stories
