= Legal at Last =

Studio album by Anvil
- Released: February 14, 2020
- Genre: Heavy metal
- Label: AFM Records; Ward Records (Japan)
- Producer: Jörg Uken and Martin "Mattes" Pfeiffer

Anvil chronology
Pounding the Pavement (2018)	Legal at Last (2020)	Impact Is Imminent (2022)

Professional ratings
Review scores
Source	Rating
Blabbermouth.net	7/10
Metal Hammer (GER)	3.5/7
Classic Rock	3/5 stars

Legal at Last is the eighteenth studio album by Canadian heavy metal band Anvil. It was released on February 14, 2020, through AFM Records.

== Track listing ==
All tracks are written by Steve "Lips" Kudlow and Robb Reiner.

No.	Title	Length
1.	"Legal at Last"	3:41
2.	"Nabbed in Nebraska"	4:33
3.	"Chemtrails"	4:06
4.	"Gasoline"	4:33
5.	"I'm Alive"	4:28
6.	"Talking to the Wall"	4:05
7.	"Glass House"	3:36
8.	"Plastic in Paradise"	5:14
9.	"Bottom Line"	3:05
10.	"Food for the Vulture"	4:38
11.	"Said and Done"	5:13
12.	"No Time" (bonus track except Japan)	3:15
Total length:		50:24

Bonus track (Japanese and Anvil Enterprises editions)
No.	Title	Length
1.	"Don't Shoot the Messenger"	3:14
Total length:		50:28

== Personnel ==
Anvil

- Steve "Lips" Kudlow – vocals, guitars
- Robb Reiner – drums
- Chris "Christ" Robertson – bass, vocals

Production

- Jörg Uken – producer
- Martin "Mattes" Pfeiffer – producer
