= Plenty of Power =

Studio album by Anvil
- Released: April 3, 2001
- Studio: Studio Victor, Montreal, Quebec, Canada
- Genre: Heavy metal, speed metal
- Length: 46:35
- Label: Hypnotic (Canada); Massacre (Europe)
- Producer: Pierre Rémillard, Anvil, Torsten Hartmann

Anvil chronology
Anthology (2000)	Plenty of Power (2001)	Still Going Strong (2002)

Professional ratings
Review scores
Source	Rating
AllMusic	3/5 stars
Rock Hard	8.0/10

Plenty of Power is the tenth studio album by Canadian heavy metal band Anvil, released in 2001.

== Track listing ==
All tracks are written by Anvil

No.	Title	Length
1.	"Plenty of Power"	4:02
2.	"Groove Science"	3:21
3.	"Ball of Fire"	3:51
4.	"The Creep"	3:39
5.	"Computer Drone"	6:16
6.	"Beat the Law"	3:35
7.	"Pro Wrestling"	4:28
8.	"Siren of the Sea"	4:15
9.	"Disgruntled"	3:20
10.	"Real Metal"	4:23
11.	"Left Behind" (Canadian CD only)	5:25
12.	"Dirty Dorothy" (German CD and LP only)	4:34

== Personnel ==
Anvil

- Steve "Lips" Kudlow – vocals, lead guitar
- Ivan Hurd – lead guitar
- Glenn Five – bass
- Robb Reiner – drums

Production

- Pierre Rémillard – engineer, mixing
- Andy Khrem – mastering
- Torsten Hartmann – executive producer
