= Forged in Fire (album) =

Studio album by Anvil
- Released: April 13, 1983
- Recorded: January–March 1983
- Studio: Phase One Studios, Toronto, Ontario, Canada
- Genre: Heavy metal, speed metal
- Length: 39:18
- Label: Attic
- Producer: Chris Tsangarides

Anvil chronology
Metal on Metal (1982)	Forged in Fire (1983)	Backwaxed (1985)

Singles from Forged in Fire
- 1. "Make It Up to You" Released: 1983

Professional ratings
Review scores
Source	Rating
AllMusic	4.5/5 stars
Collector's Guide to Heavy Metal	9/10

Forged in Fire is the third studio album by Canadian heavy metal band Anvil, released in 1983.

== Track listing ==
All tracks are written by Anvil.

Side one
No.	Title	Length
1.	"Forged in Fire"	4:45
2.	"Shadow Zone"	4:00
3.	"Free as the Wind"	5:38
4.	"Never Deceive Me"	3:35
5.	"Butter-Bust Jerky"	3:20

Side two
No.	Title	Length
6.	"Future Wars"	3:11
7.	"Hard Times - Fast Ladies"	3:49
8.	"Make It Up to You"	3:31
9.	"Motormount"	3:43
10.	"Winged Assassins"	3:46

== Personnel ==
Anvil

- Steve "Lips" Kudlow – lead vocals, lead guitar
- Dave Allison – rhythm guitar, backing vocals, lead vocals on "Never Deceive Me"
- Ian Dickson – bass
- Robb Reiner – drums

Production

- Chris Tsangarides – producer, engineer
- Andrew Warwick, Joe Primeau – assistant engineers
- Dean Motter – art direction and design
