= Nightlord =

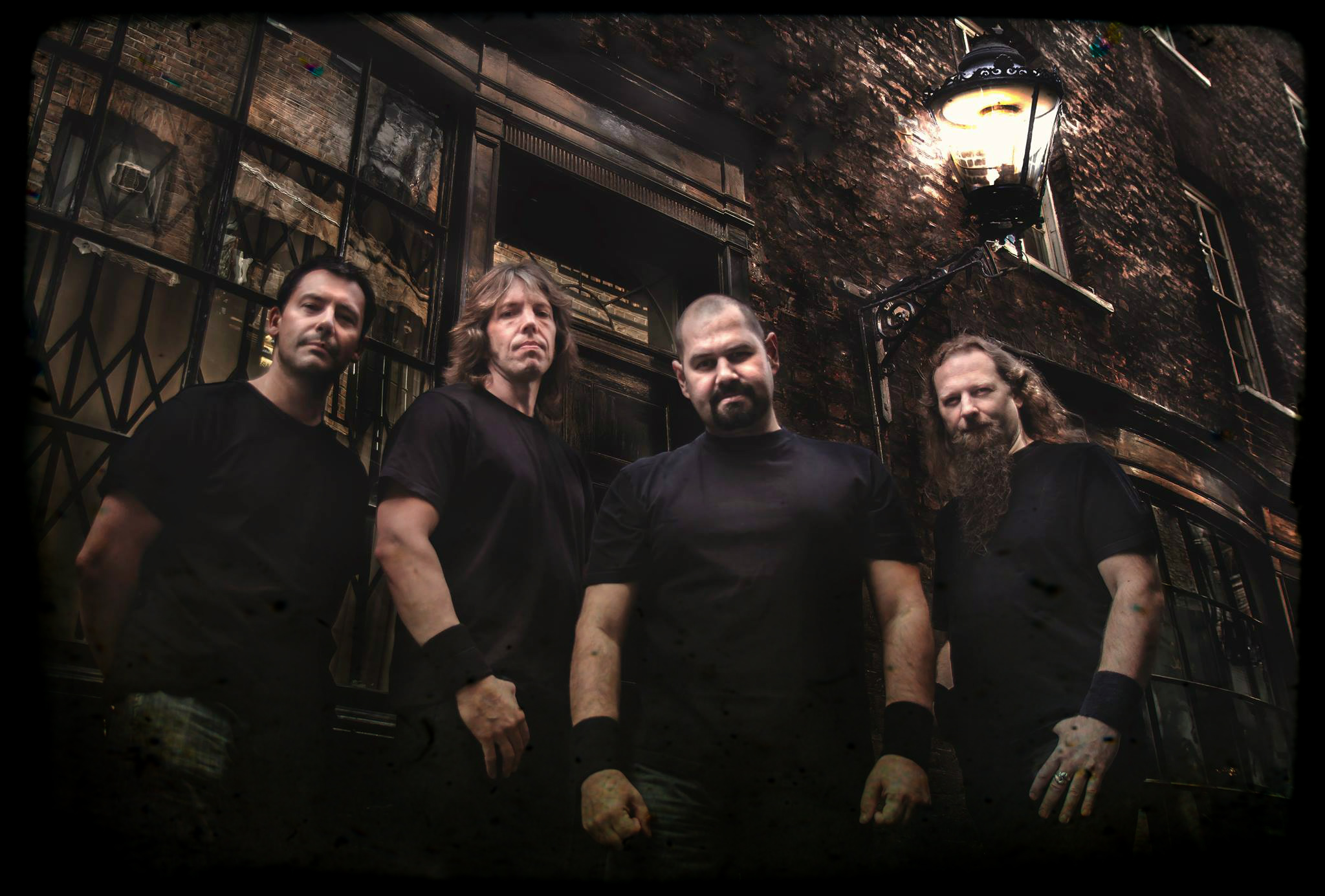
- Nightlord 2015

Background information
- Origin: London, England, UK
- Genres: Thrash metal, heavy metal
- Years active: 1989–1993, 2010–present
- Label: Copro Records
- Members: Ferenc Collins; James Mackenzie; Davide Marini; Jamie Thorne
- Website: Official site

Nightlord is a British thrash metal band, based in London, England. In 2011, following the band's reformation, Powerplay Magazine proclaimed, "The future is looking very good indeed for this now legendary band".

== History ==
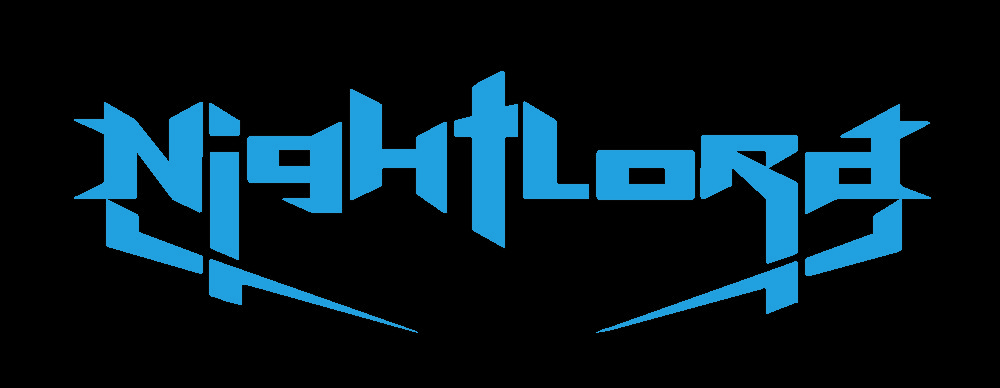
Nightlord Logo - Black Background

=== Formation ===
Friends Jamie Thorne and Ferenc Collins began discussing the idea of a band when Collins moved to London in late 1988. Thorne knew guitarist James Mackenzie and drummer Neil Wiseman, and invited them all to a jam session in May 1989. After this initial session, they decided that this combination would work, and they began writing songs with regular rehearsals for the next six months.

Nightlord's first show was at the Jolly Gardeners pub in Isleworth on 6 December 1989. Once word had spread about Nightlord, their second show headlining the then well-renowned Brentford Red Lion the following month was a total sell out.

The band went on to regularly play the UK circuit for the next four years, supporting such well-known acts as Skyclad, Paradise Lost, Nocturnus, Confessor, Korzus, Cerebral Fix, Decimator and Extreme Noise Terror.

=== Early recordings ===
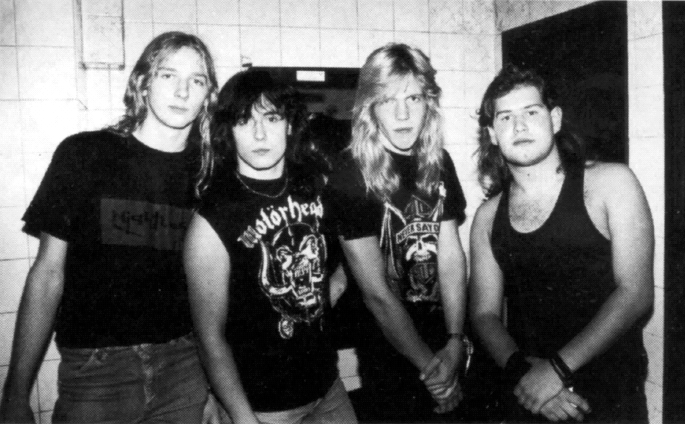
Nightlord backstage at the Marquee Club in London after their first support slot to Decimator on 25 September 1990

In mid-1990 they entered Heatham House Studios in Twickenham to record eight songs, four of which were released as a demo tape, "Approaching Thunder", which sold over 500 copies.

In April 1992, Nightlord recorded a single track for inclusion in a compilation 7-inch single, entitled, "The Unbreakable Oath". The single also features London bands Konkrete Gerbil, Dynamitte Inc and Mental Helicopters.

=== The Underground Titans Tour '92 ===
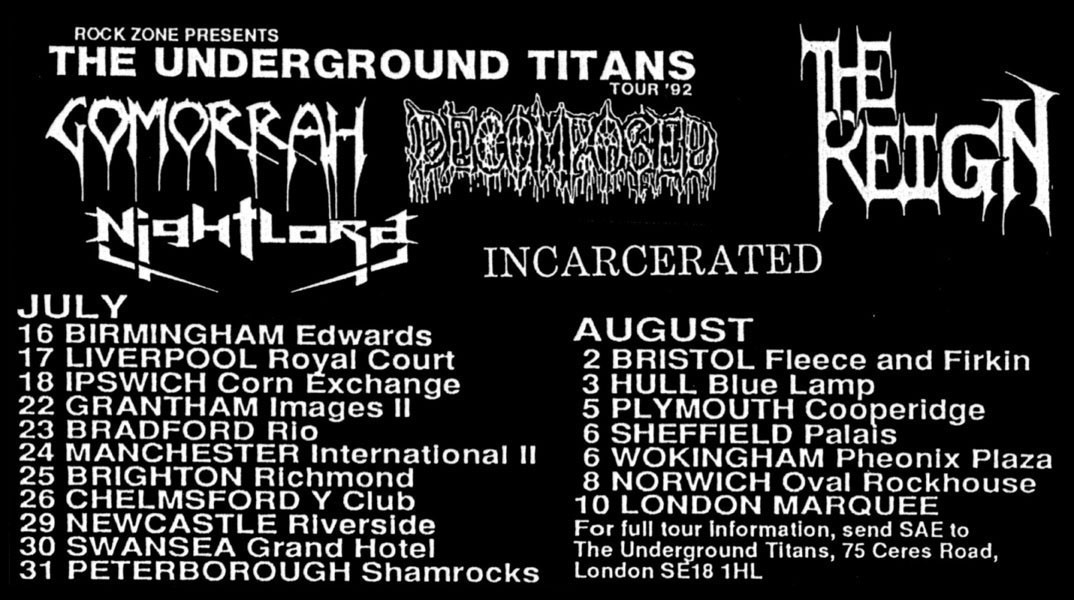
Advert for The Underground Titans Tour '92

The Underground Titans Tour '92 was the brainchild of Nightlord guitarist Ferenc Collins and then Gomorrah guitarist Jose Griffin. Having seen the success of the Clash of the Titans tour featuring Megadeth, Slayer, Testament and Suicidal Tendencies which took these bands out of the club circuit and into major arenas, the idea was to take five unsigned but successful bands and take them from the usual pub circuit into the club circuit. Featuring a rotating bill of; Decomposed, Gommorah, Incarcerated, Nightlord and The Reign the tour reached over 2000 people, culminating in a show at London's Marquee Club, and the tour is still universally recognised to this day as the first truly Underground Metal tour. The tour picked up considerable column inches in the only existing Heavy Metal publications of the day, Kerrang! and Metal Hammer, as well as a special article in The Sunday Times newspaper, exposure that was otherwise unheard of for unsigned bands at the time.

=== First line-up changes ===
James Mackenzie quit the band in July 1992, just before The Underground Titans Tour began so as a temporary measure, Kevin Fisher, long time friend of the band and guitarist for Konkrete Gerbil, stood in for the duration of the tour. Shortly after the tour, Nightlord recruited Ricky Needham who would remain until the band disbanded in April 1993. At the time the band was half-way through a recording session for a new demo tape, which was abandoned.

=== Reformation (2010 onwards) ===
Feeling a sense of unfinished business, the four original members of Nightlord met for the first time since disbanding in the summer of 2010, and before long, a comeback show was planned at London's Camden Underworld for December of that year. To mark the event, the original recording of "Approaching Thunder" was dusted down and released as a full album through Copro records. At the same time, the recording that was started in 1993 was completed and was the basis for the second album, "Cult of the Moon". This release featured four songs from this session, "Practice Makes Perfect" from "The Unspeakable Oath" session and six live tracks recorded at a show at the then-legendary Walthamstow Royal Standard in April 1992.

Since then the band have gone on to appear alongside bands such as Sepultura, Onslaught, Gama Bomb, Annihilator and Artillery, completing some other unfinished business with Artillery, following a cancelled show with them from February 1991.

It was shortly after the recording sessions of Reborn in Darkness that Nightlord announced Davide Marini had joined as a new permanent member on drums.

=== Reborn In Darkness (2017) ===
The original four members recorded their third album Reborn in Darkness during late 2015 / early 2016 and which was released in August 2017, featuring the first new songs for 24 years.

Rhythm Guitarist Ferenc Collins speaking about the new album Reborn In Darkness; "This is not an album of 100 takes-per-song with guitars edited so tight it sounds ridiculously clinical. The finished result is glorious. In the process of preserving the old-school sound we have managed to make an album that really sounds organic and human. The passion and intensity shines through to give it such a powerful and natural analogue old-school sound which is exactly what we aimed for and why we aimed high and targeted Chris Tsangarides especially for this project."

== Discography ==
- 1990 Approaching Thunder (Four-track demo cassette)
- 1990 Approaching Thunder
- 1992 The Unspeakable Oath (Four-band split 7-inch)
- 1993/2010 Cult Of The Moon
- 2017 "Sin Eater" (single)
- 2017 Reborn In Darkness

== Band members ==
=== Current ===
- Ferenc Collins - Rhythm Guitar
- James Mackenzie - Lead Guitar (May 1989 - July 1992, September 2010 onwards)
- Davide Marini - Drums (April 2016 onwards)
- Jamie Thorne - Bass, Vocals

=== Former ===
- Kevin Fisher - Lead Guitar (July - August 1992)
- Ricky Needham - Lead Guitar (September 1992 - April 1993)
- Neil Wiseman - Drums (May 1989 - May 2015)

== Sources ==
- Mörat. "Live review". Kerrang! (316, 17 November 1990).
- Exley, Mike. "Demolition". Metal Forces (64, September 1991).
- Aldis, Neil. "Fan Fair". Metal Hammer (September 1992).
- Mörat. "Interview - A Titanic Struggle". Kerrang! (405, 15 August 1992): 32.
- Arnopp, Jason. "Live review". Kerrang! (406, 22 August 1992): 56.
- Brownson-Smith, Callum. "Interview - Kings of the Nighttime World". Zero Tolerance (39, Feb/Mar 2011): 40.
- Oei, Roland. "Powerplay". Power Play (139, February 2012): 75.
