= Anvil (band) =

Canadian heavy metal band

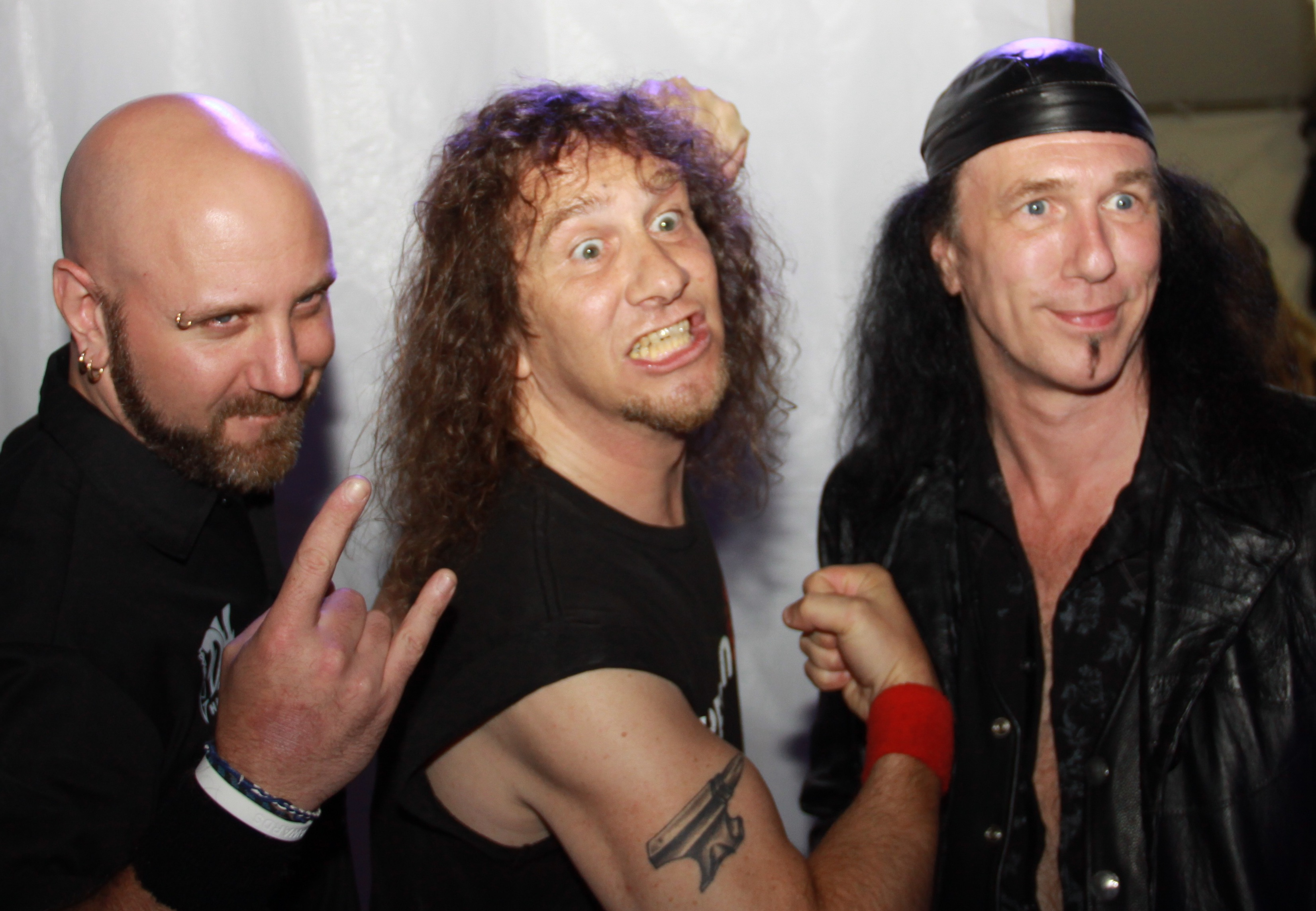
- Anvil in 2010. L–R: Former bassist Glenn Five, Steve "Lips" Kudlow, Robb Reiner

Background information
- Also known as: Lips (1978–1981)
- Origin: Toronto, Ontario, Canada
- Genres: Heavy metal; hard rock; speed metal
- Years active: 1978–present
- Labels: AFM Records; Steamhammer; The End; VH1 Classic; Massacre; Hypnotic; Maximum; Roadrunner; Metal Blade; Enigma; Viper; Attic; Polydor
- Members: Steve "Lips" Kudlow; Robb Reiner; Chris Robertson
- Past members: Ivan Hurd; Sebastian Marino; Ian Dickson; Dave Allison; Mike Duncan; Glenn Gyorffy; Sal Italiano

Anvil is a Canadian heavy metal band formed in Toronto in 1978. The band currently consists of founding members guitarist/vocalist Steve "Lips" Kudlow and drummer Robb Reiner, along with bassist Chris Robertson who joined in 2014. As of 2024, the band has released twenty studio albums; they have been cited as having influenced many notable heavy metal groups including Megadeth, Slayer, Anthrax, and Metallica.

Reviewers described Anvil as a pioneering heavy metal band which was popular in the 1980s but then faded into obscurity in the 1990s, while refusing to stop playing, recording, and performing. Anvil's antics on and off stage, the setbacks they suffered, and their determination to keep going have been compared to the fictional band Spinal Tap.

== History ==
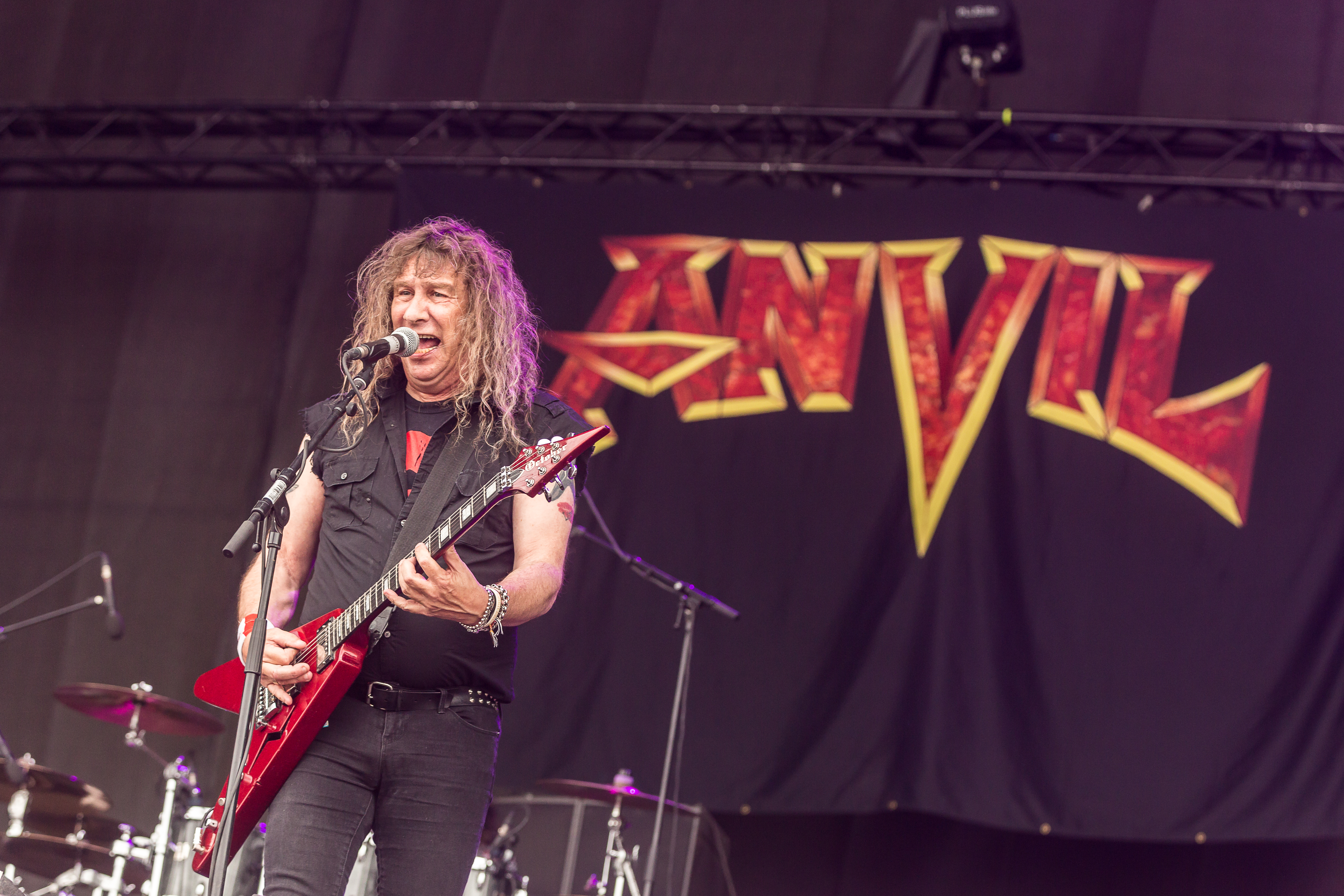
Guitarist and singer Steve "Lips" Kudlow at Rockharz Open Air 2019

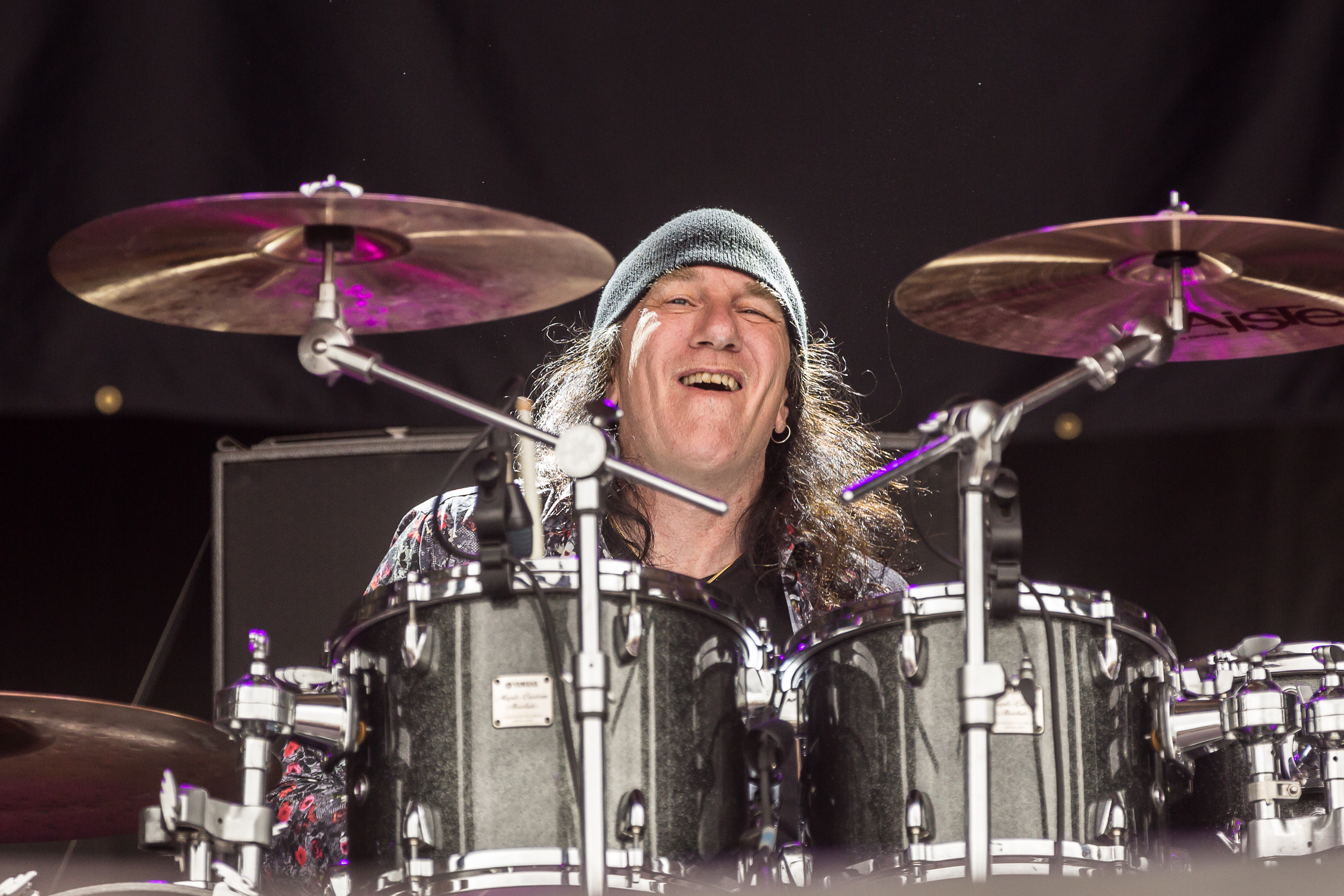
Drummer Robb Reiner at Rockharz Open Air 2019

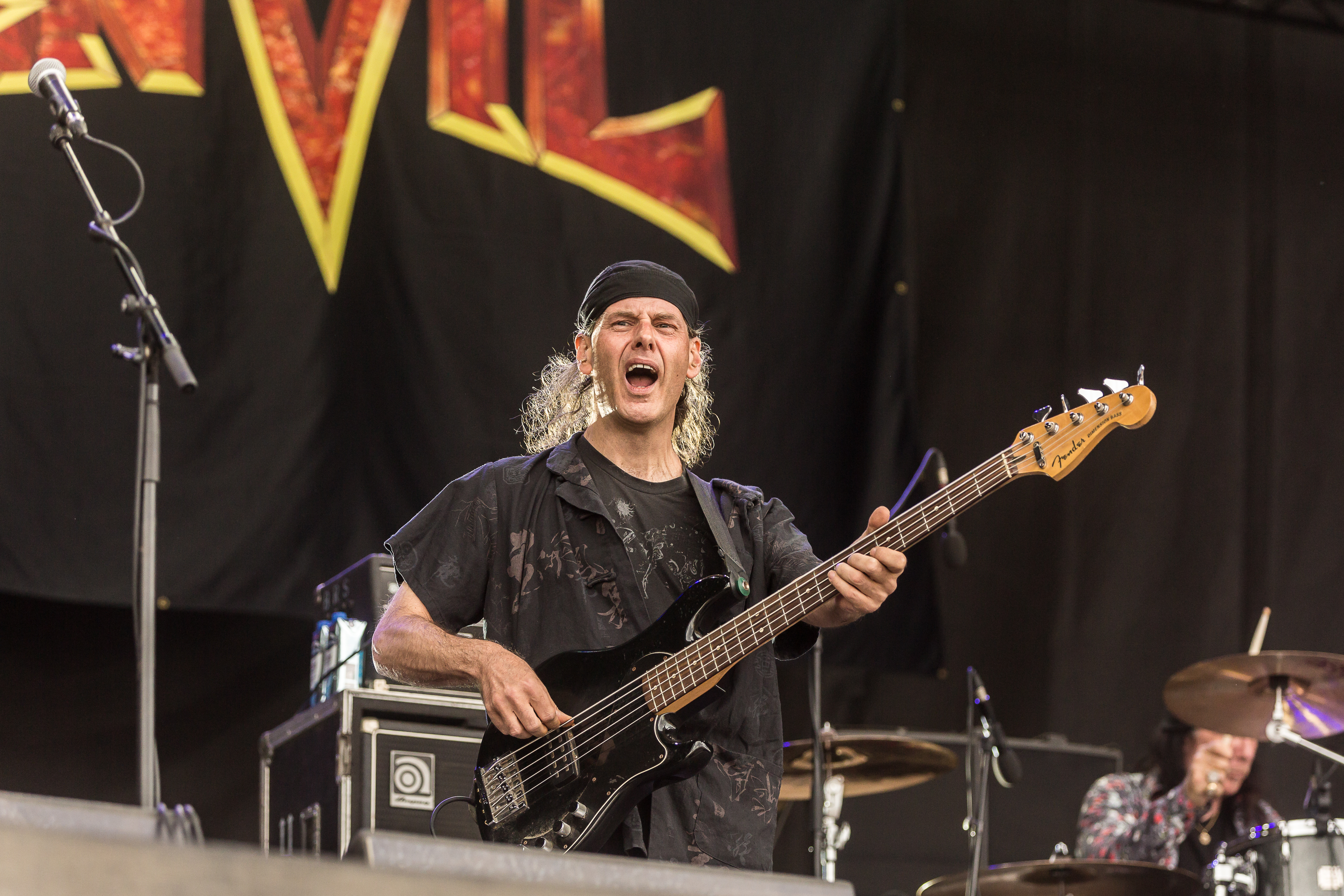
Bassist Chris Robertson at Rockharz Open Air 2019

=== Formation (1973–1981) ===
Anvil began in 1973 in a suburb of Toronto, when high school friends Steve "Lips" Kudlow and Robb Reiner began playing music together. They met through a friend, guitarist and neighbor Marty Hoffman, but "musical differences" caused his departure after their first show. In 1978, the first full line-up of the band included Kudlow (lead vocals, lead guitar), Reiner (drums), Dave "Squirrely" Allison (rhythm guitar, backing vocals), and Ian "Dix" Dickson (bass). At that point, the band was called Lips.

=== Success in the 1980s (1981–1989) ===
In 1981, the band released an independent album called Hard 'N' Heavy. Shortly after that they were signed by Attic Records and changed their name to Anvil. Their independent album was re-released by Attic as their debut album for the company. After its release, British rock musician Lemmy asked Kudlow to play guitar for Motörhead, to replace "Fast" Eddie Clarke, but Kudlow declined.

By 1983, Aerosmith manager David Krebs and assistant Paul O'Neill had signed a managing contract with Anvil and convinced Attic to release the band from its contract, so the band could sign with a major label. However, after initial interest, Krebs eventually stopped returning phone calls and did not get the band a major label recording contract; he released the band in mid-1986.

In 1987 the band was signed with American label Metal Blade Records by William Howell, a fan who became a DJ with KNAC radio. The band released three records with Metal Blade, starting with Strength of Steel, which was the group's most commercially successful record in the United States; it peaked at No. 191 on the Billboard 200.

=== Obscurity (1990–2006) ===
In 1991, Anvil was signed by Mausoleum Records which, in 1992, released their sixth album Worth the Weight. In 1996, they were signed by Hypnotic Records in Canada and Massacre Records in Germany. Hypnotic and Massacre released the albums, Plugged in Permanent (1996), Absolutely No Alternative (1997), Speed of Sound (1999), Plenty of Power (2001) and Still Going Strong (2002). The albums were not particularly well-received, and Kudlow said that Anvil would not have continued had it not been for the German fans and the German contract, adding "We'll play gigs sometimes where there's no one there".

In 1995, guitarist Sebastian Marino left the band to join Overkill. He was replaced by Ivan Hurd.

=== Anvil! The Story of Anvil documentary, and This Is Thirteen (2006–2009) ===
In 2006, the band recorded with Chris Tsangarides, who produced their acclaimed 1982 album Metal on Metal. After failing to find a new label, the album, This Is Thirteen, was self-released in 2007 and was available exclusively from the band's website. Guitarist Ivan Hurd left the band at this point to settle down with his new wife, Anvil's former tour manager Tiziana Arrigoni.

In 2008, the band was the subject of the documentary film Anvil! The Story of Anvil, directed by the screenwriter and former Anvil roadie Sacha Gervasi. The film garnered critical acclaim from many major publications; Rolling Stone called it "the year's most praised rock doc." At the film's premiere, which took place at the 2008 Sundance Film Festival, the band played "Cat Scratch Fever" with Slash and Anthrax's Scott Ian.

The high praise for the movie put Anvil back into the public consciousness, and brought the band opening slots with AC/DC and Saxon, as well as appearances at major festivals, including the Download, Hellfest, Bumbershoot and SXSW.

After the success of the Anvil documentary, VH1 Classic Records re-released This Is Thirteen on CD and vinyl on September 15, 2009, with a newly recorded song, "Thumb Hang", which was written by the band during the 1980s. The double-vinyl LP contains re-recorded versions of Anvil classics "Metal on Metal" and "666".

In 2009, Bantam Press released the book Anvil: The Story of Anvil, authored by Kudlow and Reiner with a foreword by Slash. On March 28, 2009, Kudlow and Reiner were the featured guests on VH1 Classic's That Metal Show. Anvil played the Rocklahoma festival in Pryor, Oklahoma, in 2009 and opened for AC/DC at their first few summer Black Ice World Tour shows (North American leg II). They also supported Saxon on a leg of UK shows in November.

Anvil appeared on The Tonight Show with Conan O'Brien on October 6, 2009, the first network television appearance of their career, to coincide with the release of Anvil! The Story Of Anvil on DVD in North America; on the show, the band performed "Metal on Metal".

On October 8, 2009, Anvil filmed a cameo performance in a rock club for The Green Hornet.

=== 2010–present ===
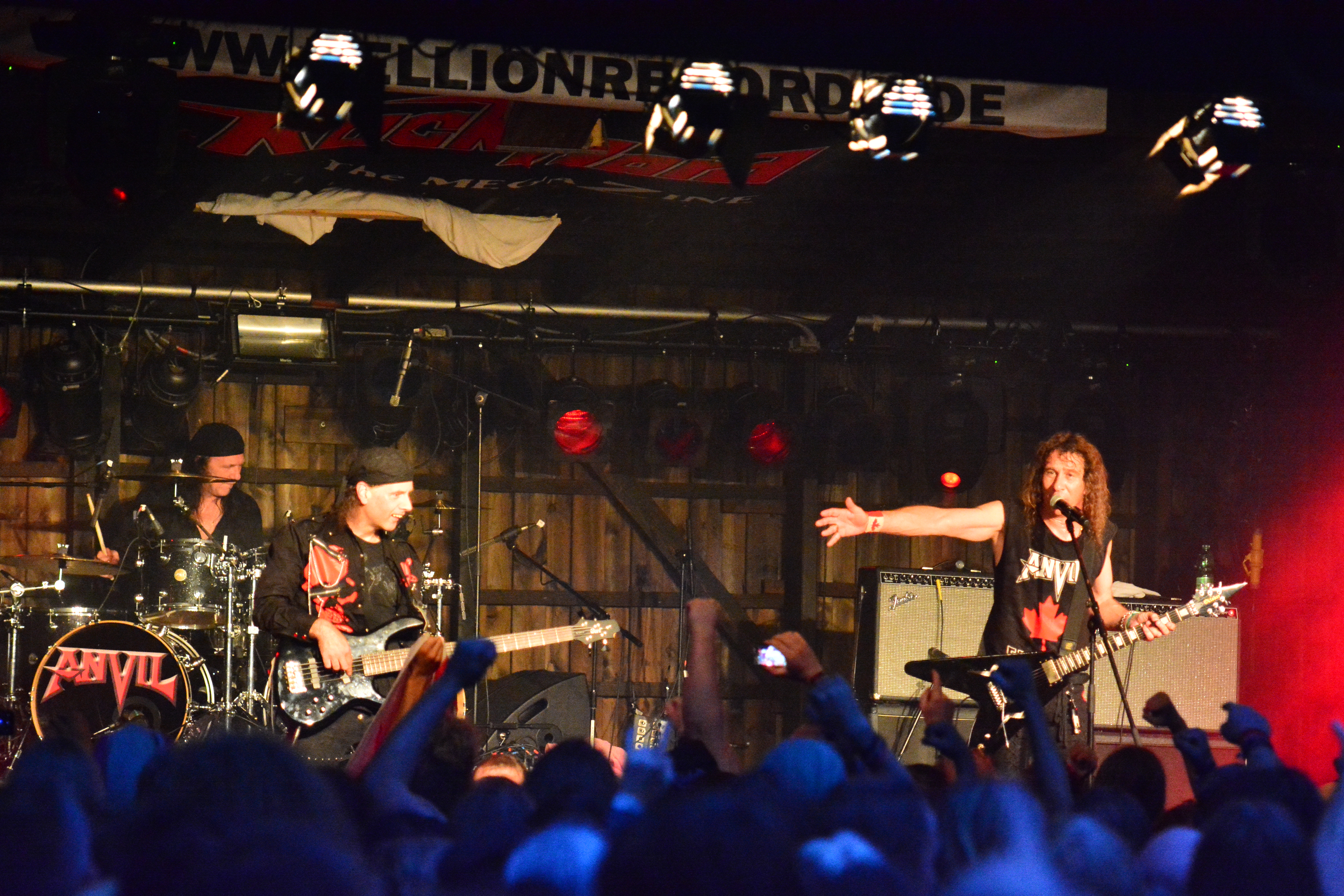
Anvil at Headbangers Open Air 2014 in Germany

From June to July 2010, Anvil went on a tour of Europe, selling out certain venues in the UK, Spain, Belgium, Switzerland, Germany, and the Netherlands as well as appearing at festivals in Finland, Sweden, France, Italy, and Germany. The band released Juggernaut of Justice, their 14th studio album, on May 10, 2011, care of The End Records.

After the release of the album the band completed yet more tours in Europe and North America, often playing alongside artists such as Alice Cooper and Saxon. The band released a new greatest hits album Monument of Metal: The Very Best of Anvil. Anvil also started re-releasing their old material, starting with Strength of Steel, Pound For Pound, and Worth the Weight later that same year.

In January 2012, bassist Glenn Gyorffy quit Anvil, citing creative differences. He was replaced by Sal Italiano, late of Iron Maiden tribute band Live After Death.

Anvil embarked on a 2012 Winter Tour of the US and in May 2013, released Hope in Hell, a studio recording produced by Bob Marlette. Kudlow said that in some songs he was inspired by his love of heavy rock'n'roll, which made him feel he "found his way home", to the time when they did their first record. In an interview with The Drummer's Journal, Lips outlined how the record was written "as if it was 1983 again." At that point, the band had signed with Steamhammer, which would release its next two albums. Anvil toured to promote the new album; they opened for Metallica in Singapore, played Wacken Open Air in Germany, swung through Australia and, in 2014, went on an extensive US tour.

In 2014, Anvil parted ways with Sal Italiano and replaced him with Chris Robertson, who was already acting as the band's rehearsal bassist and a member of their road crew.

The album Anvil Is Anvil was released on February 26, 2016; the band toured Europe and Japan in support of it. Anvil continued touring as its seventeenth album, Pounding the Pavement, was released on January 19, 2018. The band's 18th album, Legal at Last, was released on February 14, 2020, by AFM Records. On May 20, 2022, Anvil's 19th album Impact Is Imminent was released.

On January 1, 2023, former guitarist Sebastian Marino died at the age of 57. The band released their twentieth studio album, One and Only, in 2024. Former guitarist Dave Allison died on September 30, 2024, at the age of 68.

== Band members ==
=== Current ===
- Steve "Lips" Kudlow – guitars, lead vocals (1978–present)
- Robb "Robbo" Reiner – drums (1978–present)
- Chris Robertson – bass, backing and lead vocals (2014–present)

=== Former ===
- Dave "Squirrely" Allison – guitars, backing and lead vocals (1978–1989; died 2024)
- Ian "Dix" Dickson – bass (1978–1993; died 2026)
- Sebastian Marino – guitars (1989–1995; died 2023)
- Mike Duncan – bass (1993–1996)
- Ivan Hurd – guitars (1995–2007)
- Glenn "Glenn Five" Gyorffy – bass, backing vocals (1996–2012)
- Sal Italiano – bass (2012–2014)

== Discography ==
=== Studio albums ===
- Hard 'n' Heavy (1981, Attic Records)
- Metal on Metal (1982, Attic Records)
- Forged in Fire (1983, Attic Records)
- Strength of Steel (1987, Metal Blade Records, Enigma Records)
- Pound for Pound (1988, Metal Blade Records, Enigma Records)
- Worth the Weight (1992, Maximum Records)
- Plugged in Permanent (1996, Hypnotic Records)
- Absolutely No Alternative (1997, Massacre Records)
- Speed of Sound (1999, Massacre Records)
- Plenty of Power (2001, Massacre Records)
- Still Going Strong (2002, Massacre Records)
- Back to Basics (2004, Massacre Records)
- This Is Thirteen (2007, self-released)
- Juggernaut of Justice (2011, The End Records)
- Hope in Hell (2013, Steamhammer)
- Anvil Is Anvil (2016, Steamhammer)
- Pounding the Pavement (2018, Steamhammer)
- Legal at Last (2020, AFM Records)
- Impact Is Imminent (2022, AFM Records)
- One and Only (2024, AFM Records)

=== Live albums ===
- Past and Present – Live in Concert (1989, Metal Blade Records, Roadracer Records)

=== Compilation albums ===
- Backwaxed (1985, Viper Records)
- Molten Masterpieces (1989, Attic Records)
- Massacre's Classix Shape Edition (1999, Massacre Records)
- Anthology of Anvil (2000, Hypnotic Records)
- Monument of Metal (2011, The End Records)

=== Singles & EPs ===
- "School Love" (1981, Polydor Records)
- "Anvil" (1982, self-produced)
- "Stop Me"/"Tease Me, Please Me" (1982, Attic Records)
- "Metal on Metal" (1982, Attic Records)
- "Forged in Fire" (1983, Attic Records)
- "Make It Up to You" (1983, Attic Records)
- "Blood on the Ice" (1988, Metal Blade Records, Enigma Records)
- "Juggernaut of Justice" (2011, The End Records)
- Daytrotter Session (2012, Daytrotter)
- "Hope in Hell" (2013, Steamhammer)
- "Flying" (2013, Steamhammer)
- "Mankind Machine" (2013, Steamhammer)
- "Nabbed in Nebraska" (2019, AFM Records)
- "Legal at Last" (2019, AFM Records)
- "Feed Your Fantasy" (2024, AFM Records)

== Other media ==
Books

- Anvil: The Story of Anvil by Steve Kudlow and Robb Reiner (Foreword by Slash) Bantam Press (March 13, 2009) ISBN 0-593-06364-3

Film

- Anvil! The Story of Anvil, a documentary by Sacha Gervasi, filmed from late 2005 to 2007.
