= Speed of Sound (Anvil album) =

Studio album by Anvil
- Released: February 1, 1999
- Studio: Studio Victor, Montreal, Quebec, Canada
- Genre: Heavy metal, speed metal
- Length: 39:40
- Label: Hypnotic (Canada); Massacre (Europe); Avalon (Japan)
- Producer: Anvil, Gijsbert van Frankenhuyzen

Anvil chronology
Absolutely No Alternative (1996)	Speed of Sound (1999)	Anthology (1999)

Professional ratings
Review scores
Source	Rating
AllMusic	3/5 stars
Collector's Guide to Heavy Metal	8/10
Rock Hard	9.0/10

Speed of Sound is the ninth studio album by Canadian heavy metal band Anvil, released in 1999.

== Track listing ==
All lyrics are written by Steve "Lips" Kudlow; all music is composed by Anvil.

No.	Title	Length
1.	"Speed of Sound"	3:43
2.	"Blood in the Playground"	3:39
3.	"Deadbeat Dad"	3:55
4.	"Man over Broad"	2:35
5.	"No Evil"	5:29
6.	"Bullshit"	3:25
7.	"Mattress Mambo"	5:23
8.	"Secret Agent"	3:54
9.	"Life to Lead"	4:05
10.	"Park That Truck"	3:32

Japanese edition bonus tracks
No.	Title	Length
11.	"Kick Some Ass"	3:08
12.	"Vengeance to Kill"	4:13

== Personnel ==
Anvil

- Steve "Lips" Kudlow – lead vocals, lead guitar
- Ivan Hurd – lead guitar
- Glenn Gyorffy – bass, backing vocals
- Robb Reiner – drums

Production

- Pierre Rémillard – engineer, mixing
- Alexander Krull – mastering
- Gijsbert van Frankenhuyzen – executive producer
