= Roaar Records =

- Parent company: Sleeping Wizard Productions
- Founded: 2007
- Distributor(s): Sleeping Wizard Productions (U.S.); Heresey Promotions (U.K.)
- Genre: Heavy metal
- Country of origin: U.S.
- Location: Swansea, Massachusetts
- Official website: www.roaarmagazine.com/page6.html

Roaar Records is an independent record label based in Swansea, Massachusetts. The label was created in 2007 to handle new releases and back catalog of bands previously on Sleeping Wizard Productions. Its main genre is heavy metal music with a developing sister label, Vault Records, to handle non-metal genres. Its initial releases have been in download form with full releases scheduled in 2009.

As of July 2008, the label has been the distribution of the compilation Music for Middlesex 3, for the charitable organization Middlesex Human Service Agency of Waltham, Massachusetts. All profit from the CD goes the various charities MHSA supports. The CD was recorded at the annual fund-raiser and features live, previously unreleased recordings from Danny Klein, formerly of The J. Geils Band, blues legend James Montgomery (singer), who has worked with both Aerosmith and The Rolling Stones and the return performance by melodic metal legends on May 13, 2006 New England, who had their debut album partially produced by Paul Stanley of Kiss.

While still releasing singles in download form, the label released its first CD Roses Are Rare, Violence Is True by Briar Rose on May 25, 2009.

== Roster ==
- Briar Rose
- Mephisto Waltz
- Brideshead
- Mabon
