= Sara Craig =

Canadian singer-songwriter

- Born: Hamilton, Ontario, Canada
- Genres: Rock, alternative rock, jazz
- Occupation: Singer-songwriter
- Instruments: Piano, Guitar
- Years active: 1987–present
- Label: Attic

Sara Craig is a Canadian singer-songwriter.

Craig launched her career in 1987 by placing a classified ad in Toronto's NOW looking for musicians to work with. She released her debut EP in 1991, and quickly became popular in Canadian alternative and indie circles. She followed up with her major label debut, Sweet Exhaust, on Attic Records in 1994. Her follow-up, Miss Rocket, also on Attic Records, came in 1997. The album was produced by Chris Tsangarides at the Metropolis Studios in London, UK

She was nominated for Best New Solo Artist at the 1995 Juno Awards.

== Discography ==
- Sara Craig EP (1991)
- Sweet Exhaust (1994)
- Miss Rocket (1997)
