= Briar Rose (band) =

American rock band

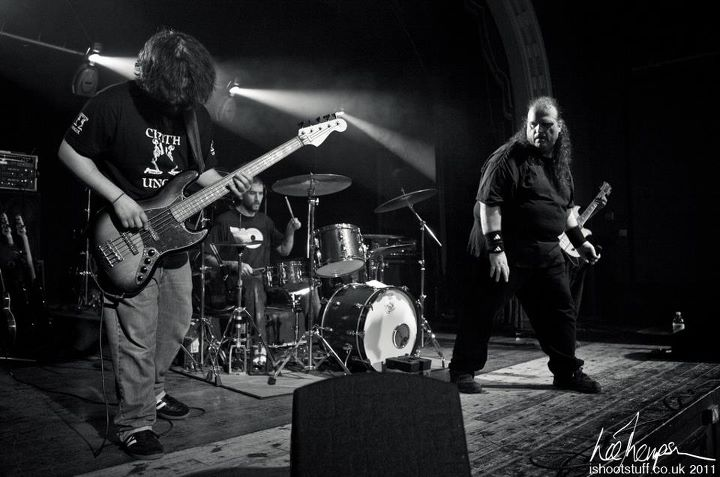
- Briar Rose at The Astor Theater in Deal, Kent UK 2011.

Background information
- Also known as: B.R., Giant Twig (Secret shows only)
- Origin: Swansea, Massachusetts U.S.
- Genres: Traditional heavy metal
- Years active: 1988–present
- Labels: SWP, Roaar Records
- Members: Randy Blake II (vocals); Jason Vanderpool (drums); Chris Landoch (bass); Joseph McDonald (keyboards); Jeff Tundis (guitar)
- Past members: Marcus Lorde (guitar); Kevin DeMello (drums); Michael Tylla (guitar); Josh Simonin (bass); Ken Sirois (drums); Phil Richardson (bass); Rodney Baker (guitar); Ryan Rogers (guitar); Chris Bourque (bass); Chris Longo (drums); Myles Lucier (guitar); Chris Reed (guitar); Randy Allen Arruda (drums); Rick D'Ambra (bass); Mike Lepore (guitar); Vinaya Saksena (guitar)

Briar Rose is a traditional heavy metal band from Swansea, Massachusetts. The band's name is taken from the title of the variant story of Sleeping Beauty by the Brothers Grimm, Briar Rose. The idea of hiding beauty in darkness to protect it from a greater darkness appealed to the band.

== Career ==
Formed in 1988 by vocalist Randy Blake II and guitarist Marcus Lorde after the demise of Brideshead, the duo retained the services of Kevin DeMello on drums and Roger Dumas on bass and formed the beginning of Briar Rose. Dumas would soon be replaced by Michael Tylla who initially was the band's bassist before moving to rhythm guitar with the arrival of new bassist Josh Simonin. In 1988, they recorded their demo / EP "Briar Rose" with producer Joe Moody in Swansea, Massachusetts. They were Moody's first heavy metal band who went on to produce acts like Vital Remains.

1991 saw the release of the band's debut album "Dark Tales of Optimism" that brought the band sales outside of the New England area and into the United Kingdom and Germany. The rock magazine Kerrang! reviewed their debut album. It noted in part, "The production has captured some of Briar Rose's hopes and aspirations with surprising clarity. The music is a surprisingly articulate grind core of early Iron Maiden with just a hint of Black Sabbath, and technically, mechanically there is nothing really on "Dark Tales of Optimism" that would offend the likes of Battlezone or Mercyful Fate."

A tour of the UK was planned but was postponed as DeMello, Tylla & Simonin left the band to pursue other musical interests. Blake II & Lorde followed through with the tour using hired musicians. Upon their return, they acquired drummer Ken Sirois. They recruited bassist Phil Richardson and guitarist Rodney Baker from their own road crew and set about writing and recording their second album "Win if You Can, Lose if You Must but Always Cheat", originally titled "Backstabbed" after a song that would appear on the album. With Joe Moody again at the helm they began recording the album in Rhode Island but had to abandon the recording due to the health of Lorde.

At this time, Sirois and Richardson departed as did Lorde who was no longer able to continue with the band. New members were acquired as Baker assumed Lorde's position as lead guitarist and rhythm for the recording of the second album with Chris Bourque taking the bass position and Chris Longo behind the drums. The album was finished and distributed to many overseas labels who showed an interest in signing the band as well as Elektra Records showing a somewhat renewed interest from a previously offered development deal. Ryan Rogers was brought in as the new rhythm guitarist.

The U.S. soon fell under the spell of Grunge and this took its toll on the band. With the exception of Blake II all the members of the band departed to chase the new genre in 1994. Within that time, Blake II pursued musical styles in his Celtic music heritage along the lines of folk rock and began a magazine publishing venture. It was through his working with overseas editors in 2000 that he learned the band had acquired a cult status and both albums were widely bootlegged. He also learned that the band were represented in books, magazines, and databases in other countries.

After requests for new material from overseas fans, he released "Detention", a bootlegged styled recording of the band's benefit show for a guitarist who passed on before his first rehearsal with them. Sales were good and Blake II continued with his publishing but the band would not take a back seat easily. He continued to get requests for new material and performances.

In 2007, he began reforming the band re-acquiring drummer Chris Longo and adding bassist Rick D’Ambra and borrowing guitarist Chris Reed and drummer Myles Lucier from Reflections Of Mortality. Lucier would for a short time fill the rhythm guitar slot to be replaced by Mike Lepore. On June 23, 2007, the band returned to the stage at the Music For Middlesex 5 festival that had previously featured acts such as Aerosmith, Boston, New England and The Fools. It was a success and the reformed Briar Rose began work on a new CD minus Chris Reed who returned to his own band.

The first release from the band was a Halloween novelty track called "Devil on a Cell Phone". In November that same year, they released their first "proper" song in 15 years in the form of "Hairy Eyeball". Longo found himself unable to commit further to the band, and in 2008, was replaced by Randy Allen Arruda on drums and the band added Kevin MacIntyre as their lead guitarist. Arruda was at one time also a crew member and provided backing vocals on the band's first album and was originally slated to be the new album's drummer but opted out to make the position available Longo. MacIntyre never made a full commitment to the band and was released. The remaining members continued on working on new material for a November 2008 recording session with Grammy nominated producer Chris Tsangarides.

2008 also saw the release of two more singles from the band in the form of "Holy Fubar" on May 20 and "Imprisoned In Flesh" on June 22. The version of "Holy Fubar" that was released is an alternate take from the "Win If You Can, Lose If You Must But Always Cheat" sessions but does not contain the "toasterized digital surface noise" effect found on the original album version. "Imprisoned in Flesh" is a 46-second A cappella cover of a track originally found on Cathedral's album "The Ethereal Mirror". The track was released for download with virtually no mention by the band.

On August 23, the band released an EP to its fan base called "Party Favor" that collected the previously released singles since 2007 and two new tracks. "Cry for Dawn" in an unfinished demo version and "I Call That True Love", a strange lo-fi rendition of a track previously recorded by Dr. Hook & the Medicine Show from their 1971 album "Doctor Hook and the Medicine Show".

Rock producer Chris Tsangarides described the reborn group as, "...[A] real band with some heavy duty tunes will be here for the recording of their new album during November."

October 29, 2008, saw the band release the second of what is to be a series of Halloween tracks in the form of an eerie rendition of Jim Stafford's 1970s Top 40 classic "Swamp Witch". A four track recording performed entirely by Blake II in the band's rehearsal studio. It was on Halloween 2008 that the band left the US for Kent, England, to begin recording their third studio album "Roses Are Rare, Violence Is True". The album was produced, recorded, mixed and in places performed with the band by Chris Tsangarides who also assumed the role of "radio personality" Osiris Elektrikill while Blake II doubled the T. Rex styled harmonies as Malaria Toxine on the track "Cry for Dawn" that also features a frustrated radio listener performed by drummer Arruda. Nine tracks were recorded for the album from the fourteen originally planned for it. Recording ran from November 1, 2008, to November 15, 2008.

The first of three proposed singles from the album was released on January 20, 2009. "Astral Groover" takes the form of a heavy 1970s influence with a modern approach. Along the lines of T. Rex melding into Cathedral while maintaining the band's own style and itentity. The middle of the track morphs into a cosmic jazz section featuring a sampled "explosion" from Steppenwolf's "Earschplittenloudenboomer" track from that band's album "7". The two other singles came in the form of "Ravens On Roadkill", a track with a heavy doom and despair feel to it and "Hail Of Bullets" that showcased the band's speed on a track whose lyrics were based on actual overheard verbal abuses. It has become one of the most intense, bordering on violent performances in the band's set list.

This is not to say that the band does not have a healthy sense of bizarre humor. In December 2009, Blake II found himself alone with a four track recorder and decided to create a strange, rude holiday recording in the style of the vocal groups of the ‘50’ like The Chordettes. The result was "Mistletoe Belt Buckle" which Blake II released under the band's name on his birthday. New Zealand DJ Brian Byas of The Molten Metal Show dared the band to rerecord the song in the style of a lounge act. One year later, "Mistletoe Belt Buckle: The Lounge Version" was released along with a video compiled with clips from the porn film "Santa Takes A Break After Christmas" and an unusual "hit’ of sorts that as of 2014 the track has over 1500 plays on YouTube.

Favorable reviews from around the world came to the "Roses Are Rare..." album which also got the band its first airplay at their area market radio station after petitioning them for airplay for the past twenty two years. However, along with the accolades came the replacement of band members. Gone were Arruda on drums, D’Ambra on bass and Lepore on guitar to be replaced by Jason Vanderpool on drums, Chris Landoch on bass and Vinaya Saksena on guitar and adding long time friend, photographer and now keyboardist Joseph McDonald who was a member of the pre Briar Rose band Brideshead (It was Blake II, Vanderpool, Landoch and McDonald that recorded the 2010 "Lounge" version of "... Belt Buckle"). Throughout 2011, more than two dozen demos and clips were worked into the band's next album by this line-up who were to record again with Chris Tsangarides in September. To hold things over, the band released a live version of "Cry For Dawn" from a show they recorded in February of the same year.

In September 2011 they returned to The Ecology Room in Kent, England to begin recording their next album "Dark Lord". Bringing some of their strongest material to date with them, the band quickly laid down the tracks. The entire album was recorded between September 24 through October 28, 2011, culminating in the release of twelve tracks to complete the album. Keyboardist McDonald was unable to make the journey but sent in his tracks to Tsangarides. The early recording of the album went well until it came time for Saksena's performance. The rest of the band learned that he would not be able to work in a professional studio setting which spilled over into the band's October 13 performance in the town of Deal with Tsangarides revived Exmore which contained previous members of the NWOBHM band More. As 2012 arrived, Saksena was asked to step down from his duties as guitarist which he complied with.

"Dark Lord" was released on June 26, 2012, and the favorable reviews continued with Metal Shock Finland proclaiming "This album is a stunning piece of work if you have not heard of these guys you should have" and Headbangers Open Air Festival stating: "This variety ranges from hard driving, up paced whirlwinds to mid paced sing along anthems, from slowly moving, heavily grinding pieces with a dark, brooding atmosphere to cool down to earth heavy rockers. It is all there and you will get truly enchanted. Have great joy with this new release that soon shall be a classic by its own." The album was proceeded by the first of four singles, "Egowhore". An autobiographical track recalling the recording of the bands; previous album "Roses Are Rare....". The video for the song chronicled hilariously the recording of the "Dark Lord" album. This single was followed by "The Illusion Dwellers" whose video featured footage from a 1960s U.S. Government training film about the effects of LSD or Lysergic acid diethylamide, "My Girlfriend Is A Witch", a cover of a track recorded originally by October Country in 1968 and "The Portrait Of Carlotta", a song utilizing the Alfred Hitchcock like concept of a spirit living in a portrait possessing a living being and changing her personality. The video for this track featured performance footage of the band, late ‘60’s stag reel footage and scenes from Hitchcock’s "Rebecca (1940 film)" as an homage to the director.

2012 saw the arrival of new guitarist Jeff Tundis and the refreshed line-up set about writing and recording demos for what would be their as yet untitled next album as well as performing at events including their two annual events "The Badass Bash" in March and "The Haunted Homecoming Show" in the fall. The later show has become the bigger of the two events with the band and fans dressing in costumes and songs being performed that the band do not play anywhere else such as Jim Stafford’s "Swamp Witch", Savoy Brown’s "Hellbound Train" or any song that strikes their fancy at the time. Songwriting would continue throughout 2013 and 2014.

On December 30th, 2014 it was revealed that the band would again be returning to the studio with producer Tsangarides to record their next album to be titled "Enchiridion". The year ended with the band posting its first official website controlled entirely by them.

== Discography ==
=== Studio albums ===
Date of Release	Title	Label	Chart positions	US sales
1988	Briar Rose (EP)	SWP / Roaar Records		
1990	Dark Tales of Optimism	SWP / Roaar Records		
1992	Win If You Can, Lose If You Must But Always Cheat	SWP / Roaar Records		
2000	Detention (Live)	SWP / Roaar Records		
2009	Roses Are Rare, Violence Is True	Roaar Records		
2012	Dark Lord	Roaar Records		
2014	Historious Mythos (Compilation)	Roaar Records		
2014	Dark Lord (Special Edition w/ new art & DVD)	Roaar Records		

=== Singles ===
Date of Release	Title	Label	Chart positions	Country
1990	The Hour of Midnight	SWP		
1990	Overtaker	SWP		
1992	The Biggest Little Word	SWP	83	Germany
1992	Backstabbed	SWP / Roaar Records		
2007	Devil on a Cell Phone	Roaar Records		
2007	Hairy Eyeball	Roaar Records		
2008	Holy Fubar	Roaar Records		
2008	Imprisoned In Flesh	Roaar Records		
2008	Swamp Witch	Roaar Records		
2009	Astral Groover	Roaar Records	60	USA
2009	Three Little Fishies	Roaar Records		
2009	Ravens on Roadkill	Roaar Records		
2009	Mistletoe Belt Buckle	Roaar Records		
2010	Hail of Bullets	Roaar Records		
2010	Mistletoe Belt Buckle: The Lounge Version	Roaar Records		
2011	Cry For Dawn (Live Official Bootleg)	Roaar Records		
2012	Egowhore	Roaar Records		
2012	The Illusion Dwellers	Roaar Records		
2013	My Girlfriend Is A Witch	Roaar Records		
2013	The Portrait Of Carlotta	Roaar Records		

=== EP's ===
Date of Release	Title	Label	Chart positions	US sales
1988	Briar Rose (EP)	SWP / Roaar Records		
1991	The Promotional Prostitution Tape	SWP / Roaar Records		
2008	Party Favor	Roaar Records		
2013	The Haunted Homecoming Show: Official Bootleg EP (live)	Roaar Records		
