= This Is Thirteen =

Studio album by Anvil
- Released: 2007
- Studio: The Ecology Room, Deal, Kent, England
- Genre: Heavy metal, speed metal
- Length: 51:01
- Label: Self-released, re-released in 2009 by VH1 Classic Records
- Producer: Chris Tsangarides

Anvil chronology
| Back to Basics (2004) | This Is Thirteen (2007) | Juggernaut of Justice (2011) |

Professional ratings
Review scores
| Source | Rating |
|---|---|
| AllMusic | 4/5 stars |

This Is Thirteen is the thirteenth studio album by Canadian heavy metal band Anvil. The original release of This Is Thirteen has 13 tracks to coincide with the album title. Some tracks are included in the movie Anvil! The Story of Anvil, which devotes some time to the recording of the album, specifically the song "Game Over". In addition, "Burning Bridges" is heard in The Final Destination, but is not on the soundtrack to that film. This Is Thirteen sold over 1,400 copies in its first week of release in the United States, and by 2009 it had sold over 7,300 copies in the United States.

== Track listing ==
| No. | Title | Length |
|---|---|---|
| 1. | "This Is Thirteen" | 6:40 |
| 2. | "Bombs Away" | 3:28 |
| 3. | "Burning Bridges" | 5:52 |
| 4. | "Ready to Fight" | 4:14 |
| 5. | "Flying Blind" | 3:11 |
| 6. | "Room #9" | 3:50 |
| 7. | "Axe to Grind" | 4:33 |
| 8. | "Feed the Greed" | 3:52 |
| 9. | "Big Business" | 3:26 |
| 10. | "Should'a Would'a Could'a" | 3:06 |
| 11. | "Worry" | 3:15 |
| 12. | "Game Over" | 2:58 |
| 13. | "American Refugee" | 2:36 |

Bonus track
| No. | Title | Length |
|---|---|---|
| 14. | "Thumb Hang" | 6:00 |

Vinyl/Australian/Japanese edition bonus tracks
| No. | Title | Length |
|---|---|---|
| 15. | "Metal on Metal (2009)" | 4:07 |
| 16. | "666 (2009)" | 4:43 |

== Personnel ==
Anvil

- Steve "Lips" Kudlow - vocals, lead guitar
- Glenn Five - bass
- Robb Reiner - drums

Additional musicians

- Ivan Hurd - guitar solos on "Worry", "Burning Bridges" and "Room #9"

Production

- Chris Tsangarides - producer, engineer, mixing

== Charts ==
| Chart (2009) | Peak position |
|---|---|
| US Independent Albums (Billboard) | 50 |
| US Heatseekers Albums (Billboard) | 18 |
