= Plugged in Permanent =

Studio album by Anvil
- Released: November 21, 1996
- Studio: Hypnotic Studio, Toronto, Canada
- Genre: Heavy metal, speed metal
- Length: 45:58
- Label: Hypnotic (Canada); Metal Blade (US); Massacre (Europe)
- Producer: Anvil

Anvil chronology
Worth the Weight (1992)	Plugged in Permanent (1996)	Absolutely No Alternative (1997)

Professional ratings
Review scores
Source	Rating
AllMusic	3/5 stars
Collector's Guide to Heavy Metal	8/10
Rock Hard	9.0/10

Plugged in Permanent is the seventh studio album by Canadian heavy metal band Anvil, released in 1996. The new official bass player was Glenn Gyorffy but studio bass tracks are credited to Mike Duncan, in his first and only release, replacing Ian Dickson. It is also the first release with Ivan Hurd on guitar replacing Sebastian Marino.

The title is a parody of the MTV Unplugged series of albums/performances. It is the band's first release on Massacre Records.

== Track listing ==
All lyrics are written by Steve "Lips" Kudlow; all music is composed by Kudlow and Robb Reiner

No.	Title	Length
1.	"Racial Hostility"	5:56
2.	"Doctor Kevorkian"	3:46
3.	"Smokin' Green"	4:56
4.	"Destined for Doom"	5:17
5.	"Killer Hill"	3:27
6.	"Face Pull"	2:54
7.	"I'm Trying to Sleep"	3:10
8.	"Five Knuckle Shuffle"	3:26
9.	"Truth or Consequence"	6:19
10.	"Guilty"	6:47

Japanese edition bonus track
No.	Title	Length
8.	"Stolen"	4:39

== Personnel ==
Anvil

- Steve "Lips" Kudlow – vocals, lead guitar
- Ivan Hurd – lead guitar
- Mike Duncan – bass
- Robb Reiner – drums

Production

- Alfio Annibalini, Daryn Barry – engineers
- Eddy Schreyer – mastering at Future Disc, Los Angeles
