= Still Going Strong =

Studio album by Anvil
- Released: August 26, 2002
- Studio: Wild Studios, Saint-Zénon, Quebec, Canada
- Genre: Heavy metal
- Length: 42:29
- Label: Hypnotic (Canada); Massacre (Europe)
- Producer: Pierre Rémillard, Anvil, Torsten Hartmann

Anvil chronology
| Plenty of Power (2001) | Still Going Strong (2002) | Back to Basics (2004) |

Professional ratings
Review scores
| Source | Rating |
|---|---|
| Blabbermouth | 3/10 |
| Rock Hard | 8.0/10 |

Still Going Strong is the eleventh studio album by Canadian heavy metal band Anvil, released in 2002.

== Track listing ==
All tracks are written by Anvil

| No. | Title | Length |
|---|---|---|
| 1. | "Race Against Time" | 4:36 |
| 2. | "In Hell" | 4:20 |
| 3. | "Holy Wood" | 3:29 |
| 4. | "Still Going Strong" | 3:42 |
| 5. | "Don't Ask Me" | 4:40 |
| 6. | "Waiting" | 4:27 |
| 7. | "White Rhino" (instrumental) | 5:20 |
| 8. | "What I'm About" | 4:39 |
| 9. | "Sativa" | 3:12 |
| 10. | "Defiant" | 4:04 |

== Personnel ==
Anvil

- Steve "Lips" Kudlow – vocals, lead guitar
- Ivan Hurd – lead guitar
- Glenn Five – bass
- Robb Reiner – drums

Production

- Pierre Rémillard – engineer, mixing
- Andy Khrem – mastering
- Torsten Hartmann – executive producer
