= Strength of Steel =

Studio album by Anvil
- Released: June 22, 1987
- Recorded: Quest Recording Studios, Oshawa, Canada
- Genre: Heavy metal
- Length: 42:05
- Label: Metal Blade / Enigma (North America); Roadrunner (Europe)
- Producer: Anvil, Paul Lachapelle, Gabor Varszegi

Anvil chronology
Backwaxed (1985)	Strength of Steel (1987)	Pound for Pound (1988)

Professional ratings
Review scores
Source	Rating
AllMusic	3/5 stars
Collector's Guide to Heavy Metal	4/10
Kerrang!	1/5 stars
Rock Hard	8.5/10

Strength of Steel is the fourth studio album by Canadian heavy metal band Anvil. It was released by Metal Blade and Enigma Records on June 22, 1987.

It is the group's sole charting album in the United States, peaking at No. 191 on the Billboard 200 album chart in 1987. It was also the band's first release on Metal Blade Records. Two of the songs on this album ("Straight Between the Eyes" and "Wild Eyes") appeared in the film Sleepaway Camp II: Unhappy Campers.

A music video was made for the song "Mad Dog".

Metal Hammer included the album cover on their list of "50 most hilariously ugly rock and metal album covers ever".

== Track listing ==
All tracks by Anvil, except "Wild Eyes" by Rich Dodson

Side one
No.	Title	Length
1.	"Strength of Steel"	3:30
2.	"Concrete Jungle"	5:21
3.	"9-2-5"	2:57
4.	"I Dreamed It Was the End of the World"	4:14
5.	"Flight of the Bumble Beast"	2:25
6.	"Cut Loose"	3:29

Side two
No.	Title	Length
7.	"Mad Dog"	3:14
8.	"Straight Between the Eyes"	3:19
9.	"Wild Eyes" (The Stampeders cover)	3:26
10.	"Kiss of Death"	5:21
11.	"Paper General"	4:49

== Personnel ==
Anvil

- Steve "Lips" Kudlow – lead vocals, lead guitar
- Dave Allison – rhythm guitar, vocals
- Ian Dickson – bass
- Robb Reiner – drums

Production

- Paul Lachapelle – producer, engineer, mixing
- Gabor Varszegi – executive producer
