= Absolutely No Alternative =

Studio album by Anvil
- Released: August 19, 1997
- Studios: Quest Recording Studios, Oshawa, Canada
- Genres: Heavy metal, speed metal
- Length: 39:23
- Labels: Hypnotic (Canada); Massacre (Europe)
- Producer: Anvil

Anvil chronology
Plugged in Permanent (1996)	Absolutely No Alternative (1997)	Speed of Sound (1999)

Professional ratings
Review scores
Source	Rating
AllMusic	2.5/5 stars
Collector's Guide to Heavy Metal	7/10
Rock Hard	9.0/10

Absolutely No Alternative is the eighth studio album by Canadian heavy metal band Anvil, released in 1997. It is the first release with Glenn "Five" Gyorffy on bass replacing Michael Duncan.

== Track listing ==
All lyrics are written by Steve "Lips" Kudlow; all music is composed by Anvil.

No.	Title	Length
1.	"Old School"	3:46
2.	"Green Jesus"	3:50
3.	"Show Me Your Tits"	2:52
4.	"No One to Follow"	4:42
5.	"Hair Pie"	3:09
6.	"Rubber Neck"	3:11
7.	"Piss Test"	4:10
8.	"Red Light"	4:53
9.	"Black or White"	3:33
10.	"Hero by Death"	5:17

Japanese edition bonus tracks
No.	Title	Length
11.	"March of the Crabs '97"	2:53
12.	"Free as the Wind" (live)	5:49

== Personnel ==
Anvil

- Steve "Lips" Kudlow – vocals, lead guitar
- Ivan Hurd – lead guitar
- Glenn Gyorffy – bass
- Robb Reiner – drums

Production

- Daryn Barry – engineer, mixing at Phase One Studios, Toronto
- Paul Lachapelle – assistant engineer
