= Back to Basics (Anvil album) =

Studio album by Anvil
- Released: March 29, 2004
- Studio: Wild Studios, Saint-Zénon, Quebec, Canada
- Genre: Heavy metal
- Length: 43:34
- Label: Galy (Canada); Massacre (Europe)
- Producer: Pierre Rémillard, Anvil, Torsten Hartmann

Anvil chronology
Still Going Strong (2002)	Back to Basics (2004)	This Is Thirteen (2007)

Professional ratings
Review scores
Source	Rating
AllMusic	3.5/5 stars
Rock Hard	5.5/10

Back to Basics is the twelfth studio album by Canadian heavy metal band Anvil, released in 2004.

== Track listing ==
All lyrics are written by Steve "Lips" Kudlow; all music is composed by Anvil

No.	Title	Length
1.	"Fuel for the Fire"	4:03
2.	"Keep It Up"	3:49
3.	"Song of Pain"	5:53
4.	"You Get What You Pay For"	3:49
5.	"Chainsaw"	5:40
6.	"Can't Catch Me"	3:33
7.	"Go Away"	3:55
8.	"Bottom Feeder"	3:03
9.	"Cruel World"	5:58
10.	"Fast Driver"	3:51

Bonus DVD Live Wacken 1998
No.	Title	Length
1.	"Five Knuckle Shuffle"
2.	"Smoking Green"
3.	"Old School"
4.	"Winged Assassins"
5.	"Forged in Fire"
6.	"March of the Crabs"
7.	"Metal on Metal"
8.	"666"
9.	"Mothra"

== Personnel ==
Anvil

- Steve "Lips" Kudlow – vocals, lead guitar
- Ivan Hurd – lead guitar
- Glenn Five – bass
- Robb Reiner – drums

Production

- Pierre Rémillard – engineer, mixing, mastering
- Torsten Hartmann – executive producer
