= Past and Present – Live in Concert =

- Cover art by Dean Motter

Live album by Anvil
- Released: July 1989
- Recorded: Live in Concert by Mobile Recording "Le Mobile".
- Venue: Waters Club, San Pedro, California, USA
- Studio: Quest Recording Studios, Oshawa, Canada
- Genre: Heavy metal, speed metal
- Length: 62:46
- Label: Metal Blade / Enigma (North America); Roadrunner (Europe)
- Producer: Anvil, Paul Lachapelle, Moshe Schwartz, Brian Slagel

Anvil chronology
Pound for Pound (1988)	Past and Present – Live in Concert (1989)	Worth the Weight (1992)

Professional ratings
Review scores
Source	Rating
AllMusic	4/5 stars
Collector's Guide to Heavy Metal	7/10
Rock Hard	9.5/10

Past and Present – Live in Concert is the first live album by Canadian heavy metal band Anvil, released in 1989.

== Track listing ==
No.	Title	Length
1.	"Concrete Jungle"	5:25
2.	"Toe Jam"	3:18
3.	"Motormount"	4:13
4.	"Forged in Fire"	5:29
5.	"Blood on the Ice"	5:58
6.	"March of the Crabs" / "Jackhammer"	11:58
7.	"Metal on Metal" / "Winged Assassins"	10:19
8.	"666" / "Mothra"	16:02

== Personnel ==
Anvil

- Steve "Lips" Kudlow – vocals, lead guitar
- Dave Allison – rhythm guitar
- Ian Dickson – bass
- Robb Reiner – drums

Production

- Paul Lachapelle – producer, engineer, mixing
- Guy Chabernau, Robert Margaloff – live recording engineers
- Moshe Schwartz, Brian Slagel – executive producers
