= Slave Raider =

American heavy metal band

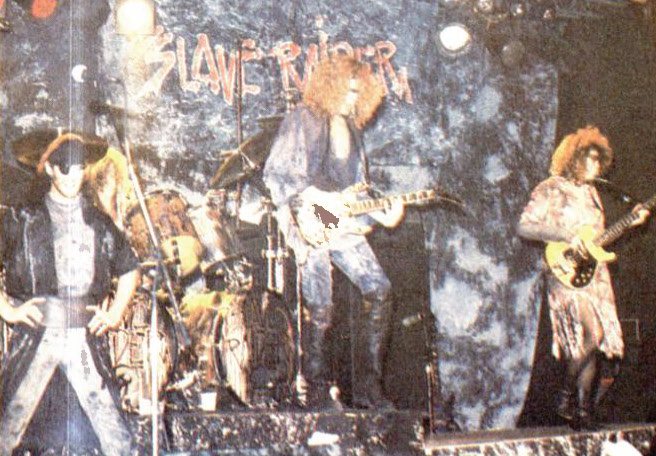
- Slave Raider performing at the 1988 Minnesota Music Awards

Background information
- Origin: Minneapolis, Minnesota
- Genres: Glam metal; hard rock
- Years active: 1985–1990
- Label: Jive
- Past members: Chainsaw Caine; Lance Sabin; Nicci Wikkid; Letitia Rae; The Rock; Tommy D

Slave Raider was an American heavy metal band formed in 1985 that was known for its over-the-top antics, heavy make-up and glam song lyrics. In the Twin Cities, Slave Raider had a sizeable following that were known as "The Raid". They opened for such 1980s bands as Ratt and Poison with the original lineup.

The lead singer, Mike Findling, performed under the persona Chainsaw Caine (wielding and operating a chainsaw on stage as part of the act). Due to an injury in his youth he had a wandering eye that he felt was a distraction to the audience when he performed, so he began to wear an eye patch. As eye patches are often associated with pirates, the band took the name "Slave Raider" from the history of pirate lore. Other members of the band performed under the names Lance Sabin (guitar), Nicci Wikked (guitar), Letitia Rae (bass), and Rock (drums).

In 1986, Slave Raider won all four Heavy Metal honors at the Minnesota Music Awards; that year Prince performed at the ceremony and Soul Asylum won for Best New Band.

The band recorded three albums in the late 1980s and early 1990s, but were never able to make much of a dent in the glam metal scene of the time, due to the beginning of the grunge movement that has been attributed to the influence of their fellow Minnesotans, the Replacements.

The band was dropped by its record label following their third album release in 1990 and broke up soon after that, with the band members going on to solo projects, with front man Chainsaw Caine forming the band U.K.I. (The Unstoppable Kamikazee Idiots). The original line up has periodically reunited since then to perform the occasional reunion show that is always "slave raiding room only".

Slave Raider's "Make Some Noise" (written by Slave Raider and D. Nagel) appeared in 1988's License to Drive, and "What Do You Know About Rock 'N' Roll?" was featured on the soundtrack to 1989's A Nightmare on Elm Street 5: The Dream Child.

The song "Youngblood", written by Slave Raider members and performed by Slave Raider, appeared in the 1994 movie entitled The Paper, which was nominated for an Oscar.

== Band members ==
- Chainsaw Caine (Mike Findling), lead vocals
- Lance Sabin, guitar
- Nicci Wikkid (David Hussman), guitar (died of cancer, August 18, 2018)
- Letitia Rae, bass
- The Rock (Patrick Williams), drums
- Tommy D (Tommy Dades), bass

== Discography ==
- Take the World by Storm - 1986
- What Do You Know About Rock 'N Roll? - 1988
- Bigger, Badder and Bolder - 1990
