= Pound for Pound (Anvil album) =

Studio album by Anvil
- Released: 21 September 1988
- Recorded: 1988
- Studio: Quest Recording Studios, Oshawa, Canada
- Genre: Heavy metal, speed metal
- Length: 36:40
- Label: Metal Blade / Enigma (North America); ZYX Metallic (Germany)
- Producer: Anvil, Paul Lachapelle, Mel Berger

Anvil chronology
Strength of Steel (1987)	Pound for Pound (1988)	Past and Present – Live in Concert (1989)

Professional ratings
Review scores
Source	Rating
AllMusic	1.5/5 stars
Collector's Guide to Heavy Metal	8/10
Rock Hard	8.0/10

Pound for Pound is the fifth studio album by Canadian heavy metal band Anvil, released in 1988.

== Track listing ==
All tracks are written by Anvil.

Side one
No.	Title	Length
1.	"Blood on the Ice"	5:26
2.	"Corporate Preacher"	4:07
3.	"Toe Jam"	2:46
4.	"Safe Sex"	3:22

Side two
No.	Title	Length
5.	"Where Does All the Money Go?"	4:06
6.	"Brain Burn"	3:30
7.	"Senile King"	4:05
8.	"Machine Gun"	2:56
9.	"Fire in the Night"	6:10
10.	"Cramps"	0:12

== Personnel ==
Anvil

- Steve "Lips" Kudlow – vocals, lead guitar
- Dave Allison – rhythm guitar
- Ian Dickson – bass
- Robb Reiner – drums

Production

- Paul Lachapelle – producer, engineer, mixing
- Mel Berger – executive producer
