= Worth the Weight =

Studio album by Anvil
- Released: July 1992
- Recorded: December 1991 – April 1992
- Studio: Quest Recording Studios, Oshawa, Canada
- Genre: Heavy metal, speed metal
- Length: 48:09
- Label: Maximum (North America); Mausolueum (Europe)
- Producer: Anvil, Paul Lachapelle, Abdul Hasad Mohammed

Anvil chronology
Past and Present – Live in Concert (1989)	Worth the Weight (1992)	Plugged in Permanent (1996)

Professional ratings
Review scores
Source	Rating
AllMusic	3/5 stars
Collector's Guide to Heavy Metal	8/10
Rock Hard	9.0/10

Worth the Weight is the sixth studio album by Canadian heavy metal band Anvil. It is Anvil's only release on Mausoleum Records and their only release with Sebastian Marino on guitar, replacing Dave Allison.

== Track listing ==
No.	Title	Writer(s)	Length
1.	"Infanticide"	Ian Dickson, Steve "Lips" Kudlow, Sebastian Marino, Robb Reiner	7:41
2.	"On the Way to Hell"	Dickson, Kudlow, Marino, Reiner	6:04
3.	"Bushpig"	Dickson, Kudlow, Reiner	4:08
4.	"Embalmer"	Kudlow, Reiner	6:53
5.	"Pow Wow"	Dickson, Kudlow, Marino, Reiner	6:00
6.	"Sins of the Flesh"	Kudlow, Reiner	5:19
7.	"A.Z. No. 85"	Dickson, Kudlow, Marino, Reiner	3:12
8.	"Sadness" / "Love Me When I'm Dead"	Kudlow, Reiner	8:52

== Personnel ==
Anvil

- Steve "Lips" Kudlow – vocals, lead guitar
- Sebastian Marino – lead guitar
- Ian Dickson – bass
- Robb Reiner – drums

Production

- Paul Lachapelle – producer, engineer, mixing
- Abdul Hasad Mohammed – executive producer
