= Chris Tsangarides =

British record producer (1956–2018)

- Born: Christopher Andrew Tsangarides; 17 August 1956; Famagusta, Cyprus
- Died: 6 January 2018 (aged 61)
- Genres: Hard rock, heavy metal, alternative rock, pop
- Occupations: Record producer, sound engineer, company owner, musician, songwriter
- Instrument: Guitar
- Years active: 1975–2018

Christopher Andrew Tsangarides (17 August 1956 – 6 January 2018) was a British record producer, sound engineer and mixer of Greek Cypriot origin. He was best known for his work with many heavy metal artists, including Gary Moore, Thin Lizzy, Judas Priest, Helloween, Anvil, Angra, Anthem, Yngwie Malmsteen, and Tygers of Pan Tang.

Tsangarides worked with many pop and alternative artists as well, including Depeche Mode, UK Decay, Tom Jones, Concrete Blonde, and The Tragically Hip.

== Early life ==
Tsangarides was born in Famagusta, Cyprus. He learned to play piano as a child and studied trumpet at the Royal Academy of Music, before studying economics at college.

== Career ==
Tsangarides started his career in the music business in 1974, as an apprentice at Morgan Studios in London, one of the major independent recording studios in the UK at the time. Initially, he worked there as a tape operator and his first job as sound engineer was on Judas Priest's second album Sad Wings of Destiny in 1976. He engineered the British hit single "Naughty Naughty Naughty" in 1977, a pop song by Joy Sarney, whose success gave him much more work as engineer at the studio. In that period he engineered and mixed albums of new wave acts, such as Japan's Obscure Alternatives (1978), and jazz fusion releases of Colosseum II and Brand X. Tsangarides befriended Colosseum II guitarist Gary Moore, who asked him to produce his solo album Back on the Streets (1978), which was Tsangarides's first job as producer. The song "Parisienne Walkways", sung on the album by Thin Lizzy's Phil Lynott, was a hit in the UK. Tsangarides continued working with Moore on live albums and produced Back to the Blues in 2001.

When Morgan Studios 3 and 4 were acquired by Zomba Management in 1980 and rechristened Battery Studios, Tsangarides was hired by the new owners as part of a team of "in-house producers" which included Robert John "Mutt" Lange, Martin Birch, Tony Platt and Nigel Green.

During the 1980s and up to the 1990s, Tsangarides became notable on the hard rock and heavy metal scene for the quality of his job and for having produced signature albums, such as Anvil's Metal on Metal in 1982, Thin Lizzy's acclaimed final studio release Thunder and Lightning in 1983 and the Grammy nominated Painkiller by Judas Priest in 1990. He worked in those years with Black Sabbath, Ozzy Osbourne, Helloween, Y&T, Tygers of Pan Tang, Anthem, Sinner, King Diamond, Ian Gillan, and produced also Bruce Dickinson's first solo album Tattooed Millionaire (1990).

Beside his work with metal bands, Tsangarides recorded songs for artists of other musical genres, like singer/songwriter Joan Armatrading, pop star Tom Jones, goth rockers the Lords of the New Church, Killing Joke and keyboardist Jan Hammer. In 1987, he remixed the song "Never Let Me Down Again" by new wave band Depeche Mode for release as a single.

The 1990s saw Tsangarides still at work with metal bands like Exodus, Overkill, Judas Priest again with the album Painkiller, Japanese band Loudness, guitar virtuoso Yngwie Malmsteen, and with Angra in the album Fireworks. He also produced for British gothic rock act the Sisters of Mercy and the alternative rock groups the Tragically Hip and Concrete Blonde. For the latter band, he also produced and engineered the hit single "Joey" in 1990. In 1999, Tsangarides collaborated as a performer and songwriter with Shin Hae-chul in the techno/metal act Monocrom. They made one album and did an arena tour in Shin's native Korea.

At the beginning of the 2000s, Tsangarides had his own music company called Rainmaker Music, which included a recording studio with the same name in South London. He later opened another studio called The Dump in Kenley, Surrey, which operated until January 2006. Among others, New Model Army, Leanne Harte, Winters Bane and Glyder recorded there.

In 2006, Tsangarides opened a new recording facility, Ecology Room Studios in Kent, England, where he went on producing new and established acts on lower budgets than in corporate studios. The Strawbs, Mountain, Steeleye Span, the Quireboys, Biomechanical, Spit Like This, Savage Messiah and many other bands recorded at his new facility. LunarMile, whose members include Toni-Marie Iommi (daughter of Black Sabbath's Tony Iommi) and Alex Hill (son of Judas Priest's Ian Hill), recorded there in June 2007.

Tsangarides is featured in Sacha Gervasi's documentary film Anvil! The Story of Anvil, released in 2009, while at work on the album This Is Thirteen, which Anvil recorded at Ecology Room Studios.

Between 2010 and 2013, Tsangarides collaborated with the Band Complete team at SAE Athens. Tsangarides acted as the recording-sessions mentor, supervisor, recording engineer, and producer. Band Complete engaged students in several areas of creative media production/publishing and the professional life of a music band. Overall, Tsangarides mentored three intakes and engineered/produced EPs for Puta Volcano, Stonebringer, and Skinny Whales.

In February 2012, Tsangarides announced details of a new record label Dark Lord Records formed with the Strawbs frontman Dave Cousins. The first release on the new label was Normalityville Horror by Spit Like This on 21 May.

Tsangarides played guitar, performed live, wrote songs and produced his last ever album with the metal band More.

== Death ==
Tsangarides died of pneumonia and heart failure on 6 January 2018, aged 61.

== Legacy ==
Tsangarides is known for a guitar recording technique called "the vortex", which he first used when recording the guitar of John Goodsall for the Brand X album Moroccan Roll in 1977. He later refined the technique, which gives to the recordings a random panning effect similar to a reverb, but obtained through a particular placement of microphones.

== Bands worked with ==
- The Amorettes
- Angra
- Anthem
- Anvil
- Aqualung
- Joan Armatrading
- Barón Rojo
- Biomechanical
- Bitches Sin
- Black Acid Souls
- Black Sabbath
- Blanco Diablo
- Blind Tiger
- Kevin Borich
- Brand X
- Briar Rose
- Broon
- Ethan Brosh
- Capital Sun
- Chemicals of Democracy
- Colosseum II
- The Comsat Angels
- Concrete Blonde
- Sara Craig
- Crowning Glory
- Dave Cousins
- Sara Craig
- Delfins
- Depeche Mode
- Desolation Angels
- Bruce Dickinson
- Exodus
- Fear of God
- Fortnox ( Epic)
- Samantha Fox
- Ian Gillan
- Girl
- Girlschool
- Glyder
- Hardwicke Circus
- Helloween
- Hex A D
- The Human League
- Incinery
- Jailcat
- Japan
- Tom Jones
- Judas Priest
- Killing Joke
- King Diamond
- King Lizard
- The Lords of the New Church
- Loudness
- Magnum
- Yngwie Malmsteen
- Mama's Boys
- Matisse
- Matt Mays and El Torpedo
- Nick Miller
- Mimas
- Money
- More
- Gary Moore
- Mountain
- New Model Army
- N.EX.T
- Nightlord
- Ozzy Osbourne
- Gilbert O'Sullivan
- Overkill
- Praying Mantis
- Prowler (band)
- The Prime Movers
- Quartz
- The Quireboys
- Rock Goddess
- Revival
- Savage Messiah
- Shin Hae-chul/Monocrom
- Sinner
- The Sisters of Mercy
- Slave Raider
- Spider
- Spit Like This
- Steeleye Span
- Stella Maris
- Stonebringer
- Strawbs
- John Sykes
- Therapy?
- Thin Lizzy
- ThisGirl
- Barbara Thompson
- Tigertailz
- TNT
- Tokyo Blade
- The Tragically Hip
- Tygers of Pan Tang
- Tytan (band)
- UFO
- UK Decay
- Virgil & the Accelerators
- Winters Bane
- Wretched Soul
- Y&T

Chris would work on his final record with NWOBHM band MORE in 2017. The record was released by the band 7 years later in 2025.

== See also ==
- List of record producers
