= Sacha Gervasi =

British writer and director

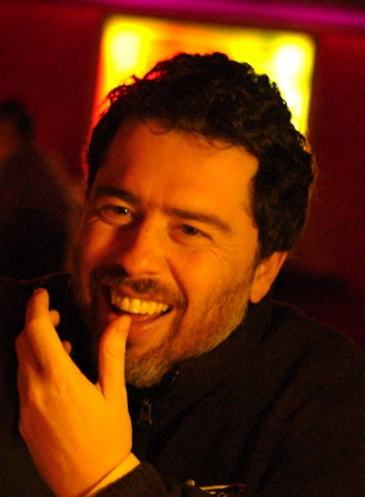
- Gervasi during the filming of Anvil! The Story of Anvil
- Born: Alexander Simon Gervasi; London, England
- Education: Westminster School; King's College London
- Occupations: Screenwriter; director
- Spouse: Jessica de Rothschild (m. 2010)
- Children: 1
- Family: Frank Gervasi (grandfather); Georgia Gibbs (step-grandmother)

Alexander Simon "Sacha" Gervasi (/dʒərˈvɑːzi/) is a British director, screenwriter and former journalist.

== Early life ==
Gervasi was born in London. His mother, Milli Kosoy, was Canadian. His father, Sean Gervasi, was an American economist who had worked as an economic advisor to President John F. Kennedy in the White House, was an expert in Yugoslav affairs and had taught at the University of Oxford, the London School of Economics and at the University of Paris in Vincennes-Saint-Denis.

His uncle, Tom Gervasi, was an expert on intelligence matters and author of the Myth of Soviet Military Supremacy and the Arsenal of Democracy series. His paternal grandfather was foreign correspondent and author Frank Gervasi and his paternal step-grandmother was singer Georgia Gibbs.

Gervasi was educated at Westminster School, and then read modern history at King's College London. As a teenager in 1982, Gervasi befriended Canadian metal band Anvil when they toured London and became a roadie for the band on three tours, eventually becoming close friends until a falling out in 1986.

== Career ==
Gervasi's first position was to work for the 18th Poet Laureate of the United Kingdom, Ted Hughes, at the Arvon Writing Foundation. After completing his degree, he subsequently worked for John Calder of the Samuel Beckett archive helping to arrange a vast sale of Beckett's personal papers at Sotheby's in 1989, including Beckett's own annotated version of Waiting for Godot, which sold to Trinity College Dublin.

Gervasi moved to Los Angeles in 1995 to attend the graduate screenwriting programme at UCLA Film School, where he twice won the BAFTA/LA scholarship. While in the programme, he supported himself by working as a journalist, writing for newspapers and magazines, including The Sunday Times, The Observer, and Punch.

From 1999 to 2000, he was the voice of Jaguar Cars on US radio and television.

Gervasi got his filmwriting start with The Big Tease, which he co-wrote with Craig Ferguson. He went on to pen The Terminal, made into a 2004 film directed by Steven Spielberg. According to London's The Daily Telegraph: "He is one of only two English screenwriters to have their scripts made into movies by Steven Spielberg. The other is Tom Stoppard [for Empire of the Sun]."

Other films for which he has written include Comrade Rockstar and How to Marry a Millionaire. He wrote and executive produced Henry's Crime. The film debuted at the Toronto Film Festival in September 2010.

He was appointed the Hunter/Zakin screenwriting chair at UCLA and taught there in spring 2009.

In 2009, Gervasi presented Steven Zaillian with the Austin Film Festival's Distinguished Screenwriter Award.

=== Anvil! The Story of Anvil ===
Gervasi directed Anvil! The Story of Anvil, a documentary of the Canadian heavy metal band Anvil, who had then been together for over 30 years. Gervasi first met Anvil on 21 September 1982 after a gig at The Marquee Club in London. He introduced himself to the band as "England's number one Anvil fan". He subsequently became a roadie for the band on their 1982, 1984 and 1985 tours, and was given the nickname "teabag" by the band. He reunited with Anvil after a break of 20 years, and started filming a documentary about them in November 2005.

The film premièred at the Sundance Film Festival in January 2008, and won Audience Awards at the 2008 Sydney Film Festival, Los Angeles Film Festival and Galway International Film Festival.

The film has received praise and high acclaim in many reviews, including a 98% rating on Rotten Tomatoes. The Times called it "the greatest film ever made about rock and roll".

The film was named Best Documentary of 2009 at the Evening Standard British Film Awards in London. Chris Martin of Coldplay, a fan of the film, presented Gervasi with the award.

In 2009, the Motion Picture Association of America opened the category of Best Picture nominees from 5 to 10. In October 2009, Anvil! The Story of Anvil was the first screener to be sent out for considering of the expanded Best Picture category as well as for Best Documentary. There was disappointment when Anvil was one of the higher-profile films not short-listed in the Best Documentary category.

The film went on to win Best Documentary at the 2010 Independent Spirit Awards in Los Angeles and Best Music Film and Best Documentary Feature at the International Documentary Association Awards.

Anvil! The Story of Anvil won an Emmy Award in 2010 in the category of Outstanding Arts and Cultural Programming.

In September 2018, The Guardian ranked Anvil! as the 7th best music documentary of all time. In NME's survey of '50 Awesome Music Movies', Anvil! is ranked number 2. A 2017 New York Post Decider article on the movie said, "almost ten years on from its initial release, Anvil ranks up there with the best rock documentaries ever made."

=== Narrative directorial debut ===
In 2012, Gervasi directed Hitchcock starring Anthony Hopkins as Alfred Hitchcock, Helen Mirren as his wife Alma, and Scarlett Johansson as Janet Leigh.

The film was released by Fox Searchlight Pictures and nominated for the Academy Award for Best Makeup and Hairstyling at the 85th Academy Awards. Helen Mirren was nominated for a BAFTA, SAG Award, and Golden Globe for her performance as Alma Reville.

=== My Dinner with Hervé ===
In August 1993, Gervasi, then a young journalist working for The Mail on Sunday, was sent to Los Angeles to interview a number of high-profile celebrities, as well as Hervé Villechaize, the French actor who starred as Tattoo on the hit American TV series Fantasy Island and as Nick Nack in The Man with the Golden Gun. In October 2018, Vulture published a first-person account of his experiences with Villechaize.

Twenty-five years after meeting Villechaize, Gervasi wrote and directed My Dinner with Hervé, a biopic of the actor based on the interviews conducted only days before the actor died by suicide in 1993. The film stars Peter Dinklage and was produced by Schindler's List writer Steven Zaillian. The movie aired on HBO and was nominated for an Emmy Award, Critics' Choice Award, PGA Award, and WGA Award for Best Longform Original.

In November 2018, Mark Povinelli, the president of Little People of America, published an article on Variety stating that the film's depiction of Villechaize was an important step for the representation of little people.

=== Other projects ===
He adapted the remake of Jo Nesbø's Norwegian thriller Headhunters for Summit Entertainment and in December 2018 it was announced that Gervasi would adapt Terrified for Fox Searchlight and Guillermo del Toro.

== Personal life ==
His grandfather Frank Gervasi was Rome bureau chief for Hearst's International News Service and joined Collier's Weekly at the start of World War II, covering the fall of the Netherlands, Belgium, and France. He was later a correspondent for The Washington Post and the chief of information for the Marshall Plan in Italy.

His grandmother was Katherine McQuiggan from Philadelphia, but his grandfather Frank remarried, to singer Georgia Gibbs, years before Gervasi was born. Gibbs is known for a number of hits from the 1950s, including "Kiss of Fire" and "Dance with Me, Henry".

While in London, Gervasi co-founded the music group Future Primitives with Gavin Rossdale, playing drums, but left the year before they changed their name to Bush.

On 14 May 2006, Geri Halliwell gave birth to their daughter, Bluebell Madonna Halliwell.

In 2010, Gervasi married British theatre producer Jessica de Rothschild, daughter of British financier Evelyn Robert de Rothschild.

== Filmography ==
Year	Title	Director	Writer	Executive Producer	Notes
1999	The Big Tease	No	Yes	Yes	
2004	The Terminal	No	Yes	No	
2008	Anvil! The Story of Anvil	Yes	No	Yes	
2010	Henry's Crime	No	Yes	Yes	
2012	Hitchcock	Yes	No	No	
2017	November Criminals	Yes	Yes	No	
2018	My Dinner with Hervé	Yes	Yes	Yes	TV movie
