= Metal on Metal =

Studio album by Anvil
- Released: April 15, 1982
- Recorded: January–February 1982
- Studios: Phase One Studios (Toronto, Ontario)
- Genres: Heavy metal, speed metal, thrash metal
- Length: 43:03
- Label: Attic
- Producer: Chris Tsangarides

Anvil chronology
Hard 'n' Heavy (1981)	Metal on Metal (1982)	Forged in Fire (1983)

Singles from Metal on Metal
- 1. "Stop Me" Released: 1982

Metal on Metal is the second studio album by Canadian heavy metal band Anvil, released in 1982.

== Reception ==
Professional ratings
Review scores
Source	Rating
AllMusic	4.5/5 stars
Collector's Guide to Heavy Metal	10/10

In 2005, Metal on Metal was ranked number 441 in Rock Hard magazine's book The 500 Greatest Rock & Metal Albums of All Time. In 2022, it was named #25 of 'The 25 greatest rock guitar albums of 1982' list in Guitar World.

The album cover, designed by Dean Motter, won the 1983 Juno Award for Best Album Graphics.

== In pop culture ==
The title song was featured on the November 14, 2010 episode of The Simpsons titled "Lisa Simpson, This Isn't Your Life".

"Tag Team" and "March of the Crabs" were both featured on the soundtrack of the 2009 video game Brütal Legend.

"666" was featured in the 2017 film adaptation of the Stephen King book, It.

== Track listing ==
All songs written and arranged by Anvil.

Side one
No.	Title	Length
1.	"Metal on Metal"	3:56
2.	"Mothra"	5:08
3.	"Stop Me"	5:26
4.	"March of the Crabs" (instrumental)	2:33
5.	"Jackhammer"	3:33

Side two
No.	Title	Length
6.	"Heat Sink"	3:57
7.	"Tag Team"	4:09
8.	"Scenery"	4:42
9.	"Tease Me, Please Me"	4:53
10.	"666"	4:46

== Personnel ==
Anvil

- Steve "Lips" Kudlow – lead vocals, lead guitar
- Dave Allison – rhythm guitar, lead vocals on "Stop Me"
- Ian Dickson – bass
- Robb Reiner – drums

Additional musicians

- Bess Ross & The Anvilites – backing vocals

Production

- Chris Tsangarides – producer, engineer
- Andrew Warwick, Joe Primeau – assistant engineers
- Ian Cooper – mastering at The Townhouse, London
- Dean Motter – art direction and design
