= Hard 'n' Heavy =

Studio album by Anvil
- Released: May 25, 1981
- Recorded: July–December 1980
- Studios: Quest Recording, Oshawa, Ontario
- Genres: Hard rock, heavy metal, speed metal
- Length: 41:00
- Label: Attic
- Producers: Dave Allison, Robb Reiner, Lips

Anvil chronology
Hard 'n' Heavy (1981)	Metal on Metal (1982)

Professional ratings
Review scores
Source	Rating
AllMusic	3/5 stars
Collector's Guide to Heavy Metal	4/10
Sounds	4.5/5 stars

Hard 'n' Heavy is the debut studio album by Canadian heavy metal band Anvil. It was originally released independently under the band name "Lips".

== Critical reception ==
Reviewer Toots Daley from British magazine Kerrang! in beginning of 1982 expressed a joy from pleasant surprise made by this album. As per him the "main strength" of Anvil "lies in the guitar/vocal prowess of Lips who comes on like a young Steve Tyler crossed with a butch Rob Halford".

Eduardio Rivadavia of AllMusic gave the album three stars out of five. He wrote: "Anvil finally latch on to their impending speed and thrash metal destiny. That destiny, as was said earlier, would take immediate shape on the following year's Metal on Metal, and the radical evolution between these first two albums clearly illustrates Anvil's internal transformation, from fans in thrall to '70s metal and hard rock to professional musicians united behind a newly discovered vision of their own."

== Track listing ==
Side one
No.	Title	Writer(s)	Length
1.	"School Love"	Steve Kudlow, Robb Reiner	3:15
2.	"AC/DC"	Kudlow	4:41
3.	"At the Apartment"	Kudlow, Reiner	5:22
4.	"I Want You Both (With Me)"	Dave Allison	3:22
5.	"Bedroom Game"	Kudlow, Reiner	4:01

Side two
No.	Title	Writer(s)	Length
6.	"Oooh Baby"	Kudlow, Reiner	2:56
7.	"Paint It Black" (The Rolling Stones cover)	Mick Jagger, Keith Richards	3:54
8.	"Oh Jane"	Allison, Kudlow, Reiner	4:54
9.	"Hot Child"	Allison, Kudlow	4:11
10.	"Bondage"	Kudlow	4:24

== Personnel ==
Anvil

- Steve "Lips" Kudlow – lead guitar, lead vocals, production
- Dave Allison – rhythm guitar, lead vocals on "I Want You Both (With Me)" and "Oh Jane", production
- Ian Dickson – bass
- Robb Reiner – drums, production

Additional musicians

- Bess Ross – background vocals on "School Love", "I Want You Both (With Me)", "Bedroom Game", and "Ooh Baby"

Production

- Paul LaChapelle – engineer, mixing
- Dean Motter – art direction and design
