= Steve "Lips" Kudlow =

Canadian guitarist and singer

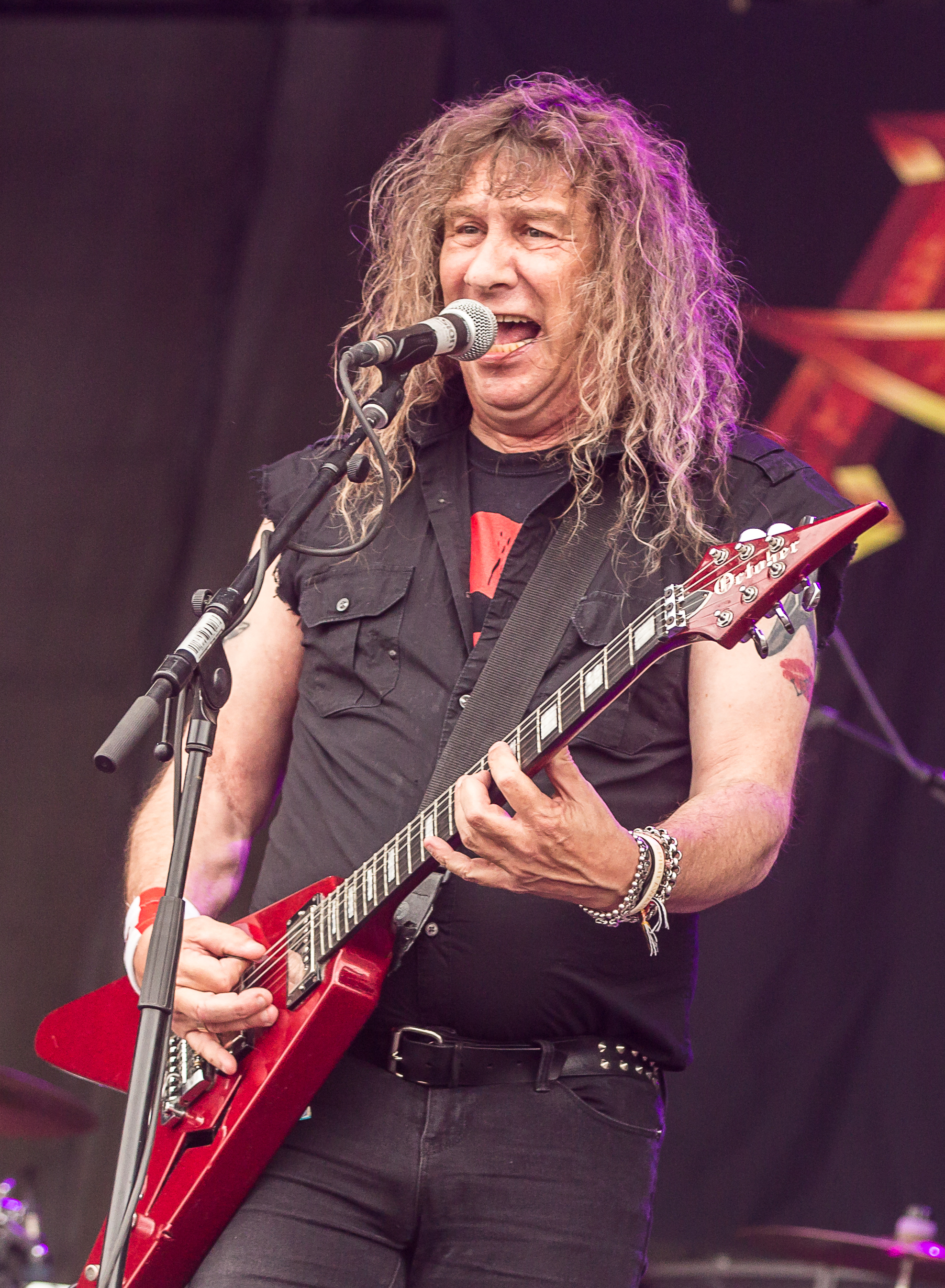
- Kudlow performing in 2019

Background information
- Also known as: Lips
- Born: Steven Barry Kudlow; March 2, 1956 (age 70); Toronto, Canada
- Genres: Heavy metal
- Occupations: Musician, songwriter
- Instruments: Vocals, guitar
- Years active: 1973–present
- Member of: Anvil
- Website: my.tbaytel.net/tgallo/anvil

Steven Barry "Lips" Kudlow (born March 2, 1956) is a Canadian musician who is the guitarist and lead vocalist of the heavy metal band Anvil. He co-founded the band with drummer Robb Reiner in 1978, having played together since 1973.

== Early life ==
Kudlow's father bought him a guitar at the age of nine, leading him to become involved in playing music, with the intention of starting a lifelong musical project. Speaking of his music during this time, Kudlow has stated that his focus was primarily on writing original material, elaborating with:

"I made sure it would consume all my time. I wanted it to be a lifelong project. I was set on having a long career in rock 'n' roll; I didn't want to be an overnight sensation. In fact, even some of my decisions, the way I wrote some songs, maybe could have even been to make sure of that… It wasn't about writing a hit single for me; it was about making music that people really dug."

Kudlow's mother was unsupportive of his ambitions and according to Kudlow himself, she was more concerned about her self-gratification and "how she'd look to her friends" than her children's happiness.

== Career ==
The roots of Anvil began in April 1973 in Toronto, when Kudlow began playing music with his high school friend Robb Reiner. They met through friend, guitarist and neighbour Marty Hoffman, but "musical differences" caused his departure after their first show. By 1978, the first full line-up of the band included Kudlow (lead vocals, lead guitar), Reiner (drums), Dave "Squirrely" Allison (vocals, rhythm guitar) and Ian "Dix" Dickson (bass). At this point, the band was called Lips, but renamed themselves Anvil in 1981.

The band, in particular Kudlow and Reiner, were the subject of the 2008 documentary film Anvil! The Story of Anvil, directed by the screenwriter and former Anvil roadie Sacha Gervasi. Upon its release, the film garnered critical acclaim from many major publications, and has since brought the band renewed recognition, including opening slots with AC/DC and Saxon. Appearances at major heavy metal festivals, including Download, Bumbershoot and Loud Park, and independent music festivals like SXSW, also followed the release of the film. Regarding the film, Lips states:

It stands as a prime example of what an industry—particularly the music industry—can put an artist through. At the same time, I take responsibility for our actions in the past. We were just sustaining who we are. Now someone's come along and brought it to a new level. Now we're getting praise for never selling out and sticking to our guns. It's a celebration. We got our notoriety on our own terms. We've done what we want. Not what someone told us to do.

Lips also was special guest on the brand new Warfare album for Evo.

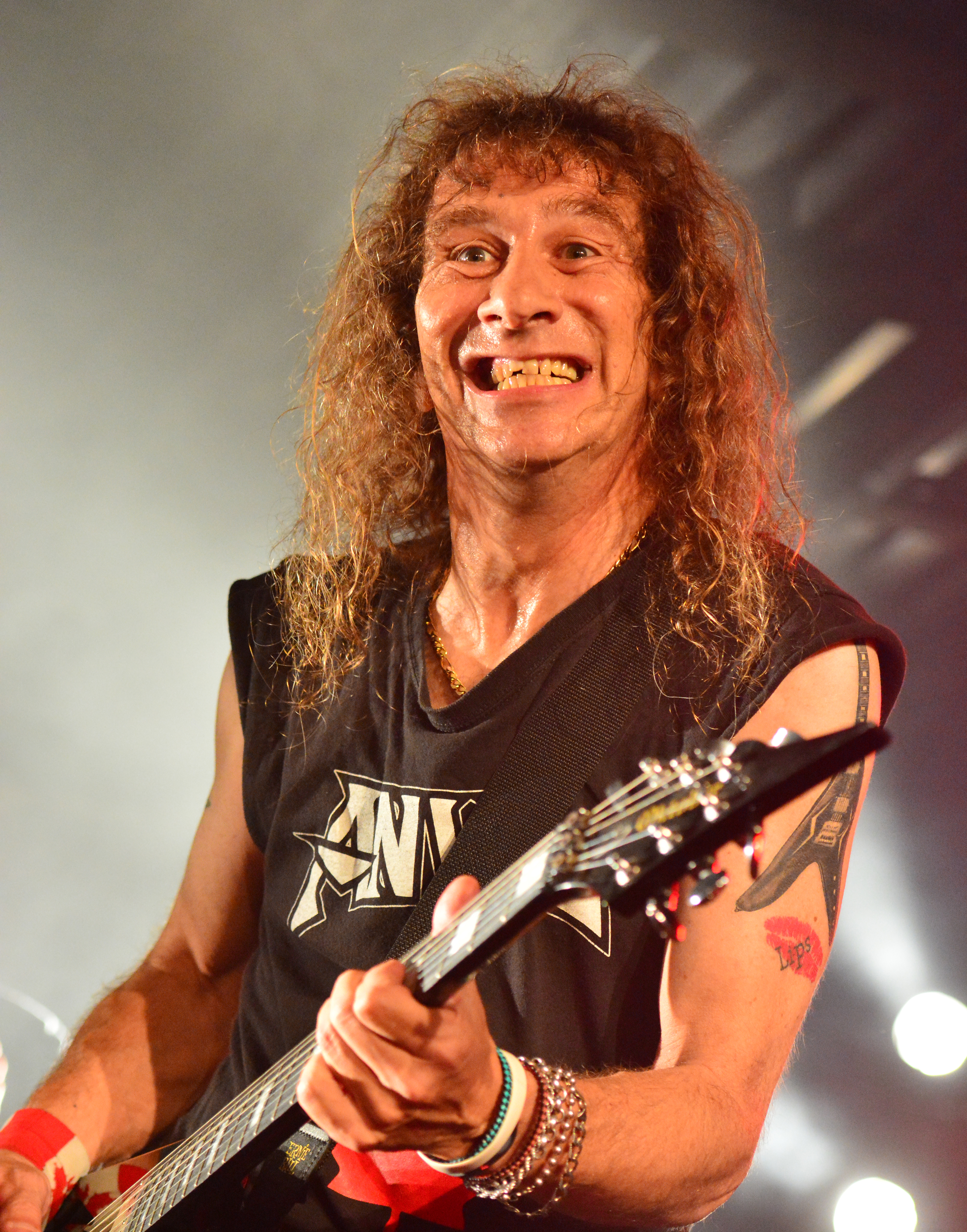
Kudlow performing with Anvil in 2014

He was invited by Lemmy Kilmister to join Motörhead in 1982, when guitarist "Fast Eddie" Clarke left the band. However, he declined and former Thin Lizzy guitarist Brian Robertson was hired. Although he wishes had taken the opportunity to "at least try it," Lips does not regret turning down the offer, saying, "It would have changed everything for Motorhead and it would have changed everything for Anvil."

== Personal life ==
Kudlow has often had other jobs during Anvil's career due to the band's continual lack of success since the late eighties and the lack of income it had produced. It is shown in the band's documentary film Anvil! The Story of Anvil that he has worked as a truck driver for a business delivering food to schools and institutions. However, despite it being often physically demanding and "backbreaking" work, he has spoken positively of his job and lifestyle, saying:

"I've raised a family, I own a home, I've lead [sic] a great, 'normal' life, which is something that you just can't do if you're a monster star your entire life. Working the other jobs allowed me to go out and play across the world and do whatever I like, but when I come home, I get to be normal again."

Kudlow's father died around the time that Anvil! The Story of Anvil was being made, which he says gave him a sense of mortality and the ambition to get noticed. His older brother later died after battling a neurological disease.
