= The Fetch (album) =

Studio album by Linda Hoyle
- Released: 7 August 2015
- Genre: Progressive rock
- Length: 59:22
- Label: Angel Air
- Producer: Mo Foster

Linda Hoyle chronology
Pieces of Me (1971)	The Fetch (2015)

The Fetch is the second album by Linda Hoyle which released by Angel Air on 7 August 2015. The album was produced by her long time friend and former bandmate Mo Foster. On 29 June 2015, Hoyle released a promotional video for the album's first track, "The Fetch".

== Background ==
Although Hoyle and Foster had remained good friends since working together in the early 1970s, it was not until 40 years later that they decided to write and record together again. The impetus for this was a performance (released as The Baskervilles Reunion 2011) at Sussex University's 50th anniversary celebration. With Hoyle living in Canada and Foster in the UK, it was difficult to negotiate a working process. So, it is not surprising that The Fetch took nearly three years to make. Logic Pro and Pro Tools were vital ingredients in the success of the project, though few of the musicians found working under these circumstances an optimal procedure. Although most recording is now undertaken in this way, the separation of musician from musician requires enormous attention to rhythmic detail and cohesion. After about a year of recording, Foster and Roger Wake, who was the recording engineer on Pieces of Me, travelled to Canada to mix the album over a two-week period. Wake then mastered the final mix in his studio in Lisbon. For more details, see Tom Semioli's "From Affinity to the Fetch: My Conversation With Linda Hoyle and Mo Foster" and Alan D. Boyd's video "Linda Hoyle: The Fetch", describing the making of the album.

== Artwork ==
In 1969, Roger Dean was involved with the Ronnie Scott organization as an album artist and designer. Hoyle and Foster, both in Affinity at that time, were also with the organization, so shared common ground. When they're working on The Fetch forty four years later, it seemed natural to ask Dean if he was interested in producing the cover art for the album. The cover art, finished at the last moment, required a final all night effort by the Angel Air production team.

"Ronnie Scott asked me to paint my first ever album cover in 1968", recalls Dean, "the year I left college (RCA). I was designing the seating for his discotheque at the time and he was looking through my sketch book. Ronnie Scott went on to ask me to design album covers for quite a few bands, but never Affinity, which was a pity because I really liked their music. Keef (Keith MacMillan) did a very good job of their [album] cover but I like nearly everybody who saw it wrongly assumed the photo on the cover was Linda, she recently informed me that it was not! So when Linda and Mo asked me, I was very pleased to work on The Fetch, I loved the title and the music. The definition of Fetch gave me a lot of scope. I wanted to take the notion of a wraith out of the human and personal into something architectural and landscape in scale. Something that was moving and ethereal but that gave the sense that you could walk around and explore but to not loose all the sinister qualities of the Fetch."

== Critical reception ==
Music critic Tom Semioli wrote in the Huffington Post "[...] Linda Hoyle follows Pieces of Me with a new studio album entitled The Fetch. With lyrics described as "autobiographical, witty, and dark" - Affinity fans spanning generations will surely be overjoyed. It's as if Linda never left..."

In The Progressive Aspect, Roger Trenwith wrote "Linda's voice is as clear as ever [...]. Listen no further than the delightful Brighton Pier or Snowy Night for proof. Fortuna is a highlight, a slightly world-weary tale backed by a Hammond-led slow blues containing a delightful organ solo by Jim Watson [...]. Linda has always had a folk influence in her work, and the fiddle, mandolin and accordion on It's The World takes this tradition onwards. Earth And Stars goes further back in time and sounds like a modern take on a medieval madrigal [...]. The Fetch is a highly enjoyable album that defies easy categorisation – Linda would not have it any other way! – and one that any lover of "the song" in all its forms will enjoy, a must for those of us who remember, even at some years remove via the arcane delights of record collecting, the belting jazz rock of Affinity and Linda's more eclectic 1970 solo album Pieces Of Me. Linda, having rediscovered her muse, is eager to make more music, and with the tantalising prospect of UK gigs in the hopefully not too distant future, things are looking good for Linda Hoyle, and I for one will be following this late blooming with anticipation."

Some Awe wrote in Some Diurnal Aural Awe "And now Hoyle has released her latest solo album The Fetch, and this too is brilliant: both that she has returned to performing after all these years, and the album itself. Her distinctive tone is still there, completely, as is the power of her voice. Hoyle is one of the great female rock vocalists – not in the Janis Joplin sense; not the growl of this fine type – and it is the album Affinity that has always exemplified this most for me, especially songs like Three Sisters and the competing-with-Hendrix cover of Dylan's All Along the Watchtower, Hoyle stamping that pure tone and strength on these and all tracks. She is perhaps better described as a jazzy vocalist, but best as simply superb. The Fetch doesn't 'rock' as much as was the case in the 70s, but the tracks instead showcase the clarity and absolute sweet replication of the tone she has always had. The opener and title track is one of the liveliest on the album, her vocal starting in an exotic and atmospheric overlay before dropping into the sassy melody, a melodious resonating tone that is exquisite. Then the shift: an oriental-esque rap, before we are swooned back to the melody. 44 years? Gone. As if nothing has changed, at all. Third Confessional is a brooding jazz ballad and reminds me of the Affinity cover of the Sebastian/Yanovsky song Coconut Grove, again the vocal tone so pure and smooth. Fourth is a beautiful folk song Brighton Pier, the town where I believe Hoyle now lives. Fifth It's the World is a polished blues with sass again, this time the violin. 'You try to fuck with a lady luck' sustains that sass as lyrics in the following blues of Fortuna, organ and horns pumping out some proper oomph. Ninth Maida Vale begins with snippets of radio announcement, including references to jazz and Affinity and Linda Hoyle and Mo Foster, so echoes of the past, and the song is quirky as lyrical reflection on that past, referring to music contracts and tube stations and the BBC and black and white and two track tape, so personal recollections on recording and living, and a guitar sound from The Stylistics. Hoyle's voice is sublime throughout. Penultimate track Earth and Stars is as 'psychedelic' as it gets, not that Affinity and Hoyle ever were, but the backwards vocal loops and effects are entirely atmospheric, with an electronic choral layer that is gorgeous [...]. This is a surprising return, and a triumphant one. The album has genuine depths in the songwriting and production, while Hoyle's singing is timewarped from the 70s in an astonishing resurrection of talent. Closer Acknowledgements is a hoot, by the way: a hymnal litany of other singers/performers as influence, and acknowledgement of such."

Dmitry M. Epstein wrote in Let it Rock "[...] the title track [...] finds Hoyle's ethereal voice flying over the sea of tribal percussion which, eventually, takes her into a trance-like bluesy chant only to burst it with explosive chorus, before this sense of movement is carried over to "Cut And Run" with the glide of producer Mo Foster's fretless bass that ushers in a mesmerizing flow rippled with Doug Boyle's electric and Oliver Whitehead's acoustic guitars. The drift may get spiritual as it does in "Snowy Night" when BJ Cole's steel kisses Linda's silvery vocals and in the celestial soundscape of "Earth And Stars" that's based on a Henry Purcell melody, but the singer never veers too much away from jazz, an integral part of her artistic manner. So, although the graceful hope of "It's The World" is covered with a fiddle-embroidered patina, a brassy uplift wraps the deceptively introspective, if full of funny moments, "Confessional" – rendered nocturnal thanks to Gary Husband's gentle shots and splashes and Ray Russell's strum. The jolly "So Simple" takes the motion further, though, its joie de vivre defying time, as if there was no gap in Hoyle's career. Yet she's an art therapist nowadays so she knows the secret of the "assembly required" method: it's not about putting things together but about gathering kindred souls for a common purpose. And if this goal was to fetch such a gem, it was worth the wait."

Goldmine Magazine remarked "Long ago and far away, Linda Hoyle was vocal and focal point of Affinity, one of the more incendiary of the jazz rock bands flaming on the edges of British prog. A single album for Vertigo at the height of its swirly iconography, was their legacy; a solo Hoyle album their final last breath. But Angel Air has worked marvels in keeping the band's name alive, with both reissued and unreleased archive albums, and now Hoyle herself resurfaces, alongside Affinity bassist Mo Foster, and a newly written and recorded album that can truly be viewed as a fresh beginning, even as it echoes back to her past. The Hoyle voice remains a thing of beauty; her willingness to stretch is deserving of your awe. [...] There are a few moments where the playing maybe gets a little slick; where the feral vision that is Hoyle at her best could be said to have taken a back seat. But visionary lyrics and a voice that drips expression are never far from view, and The Fetch lines up among this year's most unexpected comebacks, as well as one of its most welcome."

Keys and Chords said "Songs [that] deeply penetrate your soul, songs that you actually have to undergo in solitude, alone and preferably then with headphones so that you can not be disturbed. [...] this disc can only be created by talented musicians and each of them has here on a glorious way contributed."

Progressive Tracks wrote "Anyone remember Affinity? Well, Linda Hoyle was the wonderful voice behind that group in the early 70′s [...] before she left music to pursue a career in art therapy. Now Linda's back with a new solo album... and her voice seems as if a single day has passed, instead of 45 years."

babysue commented "These intricate complex songs feature exceedingly perfect arrangements, super intelligent lyrics, and some truly superb lead vocals. The Fetch seems to exist in that perfect arena where the past meets the present. Twelve cool moody reflective cuts including "The Fetch", "It's The World", "So Simple" and "Earth and Stars"."

Distorsioni wrote "Now, after an impromptu reunion with Affinity in 2006 Linda Hoyle back dramatically on the scene after 44 years with this wonderful "The Fetch", ideal continuation of a musical journey abandoned too quickly".

== Track listing ==
The Fetch
No.	Title	Writer(s)	Length
1.	"The Fetch"	Linda Hoyle; Oliver Whitehead	5:12
2.	"Cut and Run"	Hoyle; Mo Foster	5:00
3.	"Confessional"	Hoyle; Whitehead	4:32
4.	"Brighton Pier"	Hoyle; Whitehead	3:53
5.	"It's the World"	Hoyle; Whitehead	5:16
6.	"Fortuna"	Hoyle; Foster	5:17
7.	"Snowy Night"	Hoyle; Foster	6:17
8.	"West of the Moon"	Hoyle; Foster	4:13
9.	"Maida Vale"	Hoyle; Whitehead	4:52
10.	"So Simple"	Hoyle; Whitehead	4:53
11.	"Earth and Stars"	Nahum Tate; Henry Purcell; Jack Hey	4:51
12.	"Acknowledgements"	Hoyle; Whitehead	4:28
Total length:			59:22

== Personnel ==
- Linda Hoyle – Vocals
- Mo Foster – 5-string Bass, Fretless Bass, Guitars, Drums, Percussion, Drum Programming, Keyboards, Choir Programming, Brass Arranging/Programming, Mandolin, Recorders
- Oliver Whitehead – Guitars, Keyboard
- Corrina Silvester – Percussion
- Ray Russell – Guitar
- Gary Husband – Drums, Electric Piano
- Nick Nicholas – Double Bass
- Dougie Boyle – Guitars, Electric Sitar
- BJ Cole – Pedal Steel Guitar
- Peter Van Hooke – Drums
- Chris Haigh – Fiddle
- Jim Watson – Electric Piano, Hammond Organ
- Julian Littman – Mandolin, Accordion
- Chris Biscoe – Soprano Sax, Alto Sax
- Bill Worrall – Piano, Church Organ
- George Shilling – Cello
- Rupert Cobb – Trumpet
- Jack Hey – Sound Design
- Wendy Hoile – Visual Design, Additional Vocals
- Friends of OIART – Choir
- Roger Dean – Cover Art
- Roger Wake – Engineer
- Mark McDonald – Assistant Engineer

=== Posthumous credits ===
- Humphrey Lyttelton – Narration on track Maida Vale
- Nahum Tate – Libretto for Henry Purcell's opera Dido and Aeneas, including Dido's Lament which inspired the track Earth and Stars
