= Bel Assis =

Studio album by Mo Foster
- Released: 1988
- Recorded: October 1987 – January 1988
- Genres: Rock; ambient
- Length: 59:55
- Labels: MMC; Repertoire; Inak; Angel Air
- Producer: Mo Foster

Mo Foster chronology
Bel Assis (1988)	Southern Reunion (1991)

Bel Assis is Mo Foster's first album. He produced all the tracks, with engineering and mixing by Simon Smart. He worked on it for four years.

Bel Assis was originally released on Pete Van Hooke's fledgling MMC record label in 1988 and was subsequently remastered and re-released in 2003 by Angel Air Records.

== Critical reception ==
The Observer praised the "delicate and minutely textured electronic sounds... The effect is both dazzling and blissfully calm." Goldmine called the album "an often eclectic and constantly breathtaking piece of work".

== Track listing ==
1. "The Light in Your Eyes" – 5:42
2. "A Walk in the Country" – 4:31
3. "Gaia" – 6:27
4. "Crete Revisited" – 4:44
5. "So Far Away" – 3:47
6. "Analytical Engine" – 5:01
7. "Pump II" – 6:05
8. "Jaco" – 6:11
9. "Bel Assis" – 3:43
10. "And Then There Were Ten" – 5:01
11. "Nomad" – 8:10

All tracks were written by Foster, with the exception of tracks 5 and 10 which were written by Foster and Ray Russell.

== Personnel ==
- Mo Foster – Basses, keyboards
- Simon Phillips – Drums
- Gary Moore – Guitar
- Stan Sulzman – Soprano sax
- Ray Russell – Guitars
- Frank Ricotti – Vibraphone
- Peter Van Hooke – Electronic percussion
- Rod Argent – Keyboards
- Dave Defries – Trumpet
- Sal Gallina – Electronic wind instruments

== Technical details ==
The album was recorded on 24 track analogue at 30ips without noise reduction. It was mixed to 2-track analogue using Dolby SR. It was mastered to the 1610 format and PQ edited at EMI's Abbey Road Studio

It was recorded between October 1987 and January 1988 at several studios:

- Last Chance Recordings, London, England
- The White House Studio, Suffolk, England
- The Red House Studio, Bedfordshire, England
- Eastcote Studio, London, England
- Windmill Lane Studios, Dublin, Ireland

=== Additional technical staff ===
Additional engineers:

- Richard Dodd
- Norman Goodman
- Graham Lyons
- Neil Richmond
- Keiron Wheeler
- Pat McCarthy
- Fran Kelly
