= Vivienne McAuliffe =

Background information
- Born: Vivienne Jill McAuliffe; 19 July 1948
- Died: 21 October 1998 (aged 50)
- Occupations: Singer; songwriter
- Formerly of: Principal Edwards Magic Theatre, Affinity

Vivienne Jill McAuliffe (19 July 1948 – 21 October 1998) was an English singer and songwriter, best known as lead singer of English jazz-rock fusion band Affinity and as a founding member of Principal Edwards Magic Theatre while at University of Exeter. McAuliffe also worked with Patrick Moraz while he was a member of the rock band Yes, singing on his first two solo albums. She also worked with Gerry Rafferty on his number one album City to City.

== History ==
In 1968 McAuliffe was a founder member of a loosely-based artistic co-operative called the Principal Edwards Magic Theatre at Exeter University. They were one of the first groups signed up with BBC Radio 1 disc jockey John Peel on his record label Dandelion Records. McAuliffe was the lead vocalist of the band. They used theatre as part of their act, but tensions between theatre and rock group developed which led eventually to the break-up of the group in December 1971.

The Principal Edwards Magic Theatre produced two albums while McAuliffe was still a member; Soundtrack in 1969 and The Asmoto Running Band in 1971, both on the Dandelion label. After leaving the Principal Edwards Magic Theatre, McAuliffe joined Affinity. They had first met McAuliffe at Exeter University while they were playing one of their last gigs with their original line-up. They had material for a whole new set and club dates soon followed. However, they never released a studio album, and it was not until 2003 that 1971–1972 was released after the band had split up in 1972. Three members of Affinity—Mo Foster (bass guitar), Mike Jopp (guitar), and Grant Serpell (drums) — went off to tour with Mike d'Abo (former member of Manfred Mann), and subsequently the band split up.

McAuliffe went on to sing with various bands around London. She also sang on many records, with artists such as Gerry Rafferty on his album City to City, Patrick Moraz's The Story of I and Out in the Sun and ex-members of Genesis, including Phil Collins, singing alongside him on the song "God If I Saw Her Now" from Anthony Phillips 1977 album The Geese & the Ghost.

In later life McAuliffe worked with the fashion designer John Galliano, and eventually became a senior lecturer at the London College of Fashion.

She died in October 1998, at the age of 50.

== Discography ==
Principal Edwards Magic Theatre

- Soundtrack (1969)
- The Asmoto Running Band (1971)

Affinity

- 1971–1972 (2003)

Pete Brown

- The "Not Forgotten" Association (1973)

Patrick Moraz

- The Story of I (1976)
- Out in the Sun (1977)

Michael Chapman

- The Man Who Hated Mornings (1977)

Anthony Phillips

- The Geese & the Ghost (1977)

Gerry Rafferty

- City to City (1978)

Vapour Trails

- Vapour Trails (1979)

Aviator

- Turbulence (1980)

Camel

- "Neon Magic" (co-writer) (1979)
