= Southern Reunion =

Studio album by Mo Foster
- Released: 1991
- Recorded: Between June/July 1989 and Sept 1990
- Genres: Jazz-Fusion, rock, ambient
- Length: 59:55
- Labels: MMC, Inak, Angel Air
- Producer: Mo Foster

Mo Foster chronology
Bel Assis (1988)	Southern Reunion (1991)	Time To Think (2002)

Southern Reunion (Angel Air SJPCD163) is Mo Foster's second solo album.

All tracks were produced by Mo, engineered and mixed by Simon Smart, with the exception of "The Man From The Everglades" which was engineered and mixed by Mo.

Southern Reunion was originally released on the MMC label in 1991 and was subsequently remastered and re-released in 2004 on the Angel Air record label.

The album was rated 4 out of 5 stars by AllMusic.

== Track listing ==
1. "Gil" – 5:22
2. "Blue" – 5:25
3. "Achill Island" – 6:48
4. "Waves" – 5:17
5. "Tricotism" – 4:06
6. "A Notional Anthem" – 5:28
7. "Southern Reunion" – 4:29
8. "Grand Unified Boogie" – 3:57
9. "Fractal Landscape" – 4:24
10. "Shin-Kan-Sen" – 6:09
11. "The Man From The Everglades" – 4:05 (bonus track only on 2004 reissue)

All tracks were written by Mo Foster with the exception of "Tricotism" which was written by Oscar Pettiford.

== Personnel ==
- Mo Foster - Basses, keyboards
- Gary Husband - drums, keyboards
- Gary Moore - Guitar
- Ray Warleigh - Flute, Alto Flute, Piccolo
- Iain Ballamy - Soprano saxophone
- Stan Sulzman - Soprano saxophone
- Ray Russell - Guitar
- Frank Ricotti - Vibraphone, percussion
- Stuart Brookes - Trumpet
- Greg Knowles - percussion
- Geoff Castle - keyboards
- Julian Littman - Mandolin
- Snail's-Pace Slim - Slide Guitar
- Karen Bates - Voice

== Technical details ==
It was recorded between June and July 1988 and September 1990 at Last Chance Recordings, London, England with additional recordings being made at Woodcray Manor Studios, Berkshire, England and Northpond Studio, London, England.

The 2004 re-release was digitally remastered from the original analogue masters by Simon Smart at Blue Base Studio, London, England.
