= Live at Blues West 14 =

Live At Blues West 14

Live album by Mo Foster
- Released: 2006
- Recorded: Various dates in the mid 1990s
- Genre: jazz, ambient
- Length: 61:50
- Label: Angel Air
- Producer: Mo Foster

Mo Foster chronology
Time To Think (2002)	Live At Blues West 14 (2006)	Belsize Lane: A Collection of Sketches (2007)

Professional ratings
Review scores
Source	Rating
AllMusic	4/5 stars

Live At Blues West 14 is Mo Foster's fourth solo album.

All tracks were produced and arranged by Mo and mixed by Simon Smart.

Live At Blues West 14 was released on the Angel Air label in 2006.

== Track listing ==
1. "Hot Buttered Cats" – 7:40
2. "Prelude - That Dream Again" – 1:07
3. "So Far Away" – 6:15
4. "Oh No" – 5:01
5. "The Cry of The Unheard" – 4:59
6. "Prelude - Blues SW19" – 2:28
7. "Tricotism" – 4:18
8. "Let's Go On Somewhere" – 5:25
9. "Tradewinds" – 4:14
10. "The Four Susans" – 6:05
11. "The Importance Of Being Invoiced" – 3:49
12. "Crete: Yet Another Visit" – 4:36
13. "Blues For B&C" – 5:53

== Personnel ==
- Mo Foster - Bass guitar, Fretless Bass, Acoustic Guitar, keyboards
- Ray Russell - Electric guitar, Acoustic Guitar
- Simon Chamberlain - Piano
- Dave Hartley - Piano
- Phil Peskett - Piano, keyboards
- Nick Brown - Electric Piano
- Gary Husband - drums
- Ralph Salmins - drums
- Iain Bellamy - Soprano Saxophone
- Corrina Silvester - percussion
- Frank Ricotti - percussion

=== Writing Credits ===
All tracks were written by Mo with the exception of:

- "So Far Away" written by Mo Foster and Ray Russell
- "Prelude - Blues SW19" written by Simon Chamberlain
- "Tricotism" written by Oscar Pettiford.

== Technical details ==
The album was recorded live on the Northpond Mobile at Blues West 14, Kensington, London and engineered by Paul Leader with the exceptions of:

- "Prelude - That Dream Again": Recorded live at Lauderdale House, Highgate, London. Engineered by Paul Leader.
- "Hot Buttered Cats": Recorded live at Cinque Ports, Uckfield, Sussex. Engineered by Rik Walton.
