= Pieces of Me (Linda Hoyle album) =

Studio album by Linda Hoyle
- Released: November 1971
- Recorded: 1971
- Genre: Jazz Rock
- Length: 43:55
- Label: Vertigo
- Producer: Pete King

Linda Hoyle chronology
Pieces of Me (1971)	The Fetch (2015)

Pieces of Me is a solo album by former Affinity vocalist Linda Hoyle. Only 300 copies of the album were pressed. It is one of Vertigo's rarest albums.

== Track listing ==
Side one
No.	Title	Writer(s)	Length
1.	"Backlash Blues"	Nina Simone	5:55
2.	"Paper Tulips"	Linda Hoyle, Karl Jenkins	3:34
3.	"Black Crow"	Hoyle, Jenkins	3:17
4.	"For My Darling"	Hoyle, Jenkins	3:58
5.	"Pieces of Me"	Hoyle, Jenkins	4:08

Side two
No.	Title	Writer(s)	Length
6.	"Lonely Women"	Laura Nyro	4:06
7.	"Hymn to Valerie Solanas"	Hoyle, Jenkins	4:03
8.	"The Ballad of Morty Mole"	Hoyle, Jenkins	4:33
9.	"Journey's End"	Hoyle, Jenkins	3:15
10.	"Morning for One"	Hoyle, Jenkins	4:23
11.	"Barrel House Music"	Mildred Bailey	2:43

== Personnel ==
- Linda Hoyle - vocals
- Chris Spedding - guitars
- Karl Jenkins - piano, oboe, orchestra arrangement and conductor
- Jeff Clyne - bass
- John Marshall - drums, percussion
- Colin Purbrook - piano (track 11)
- Roger Wake - recording engineer
