= Linda Hoyle =

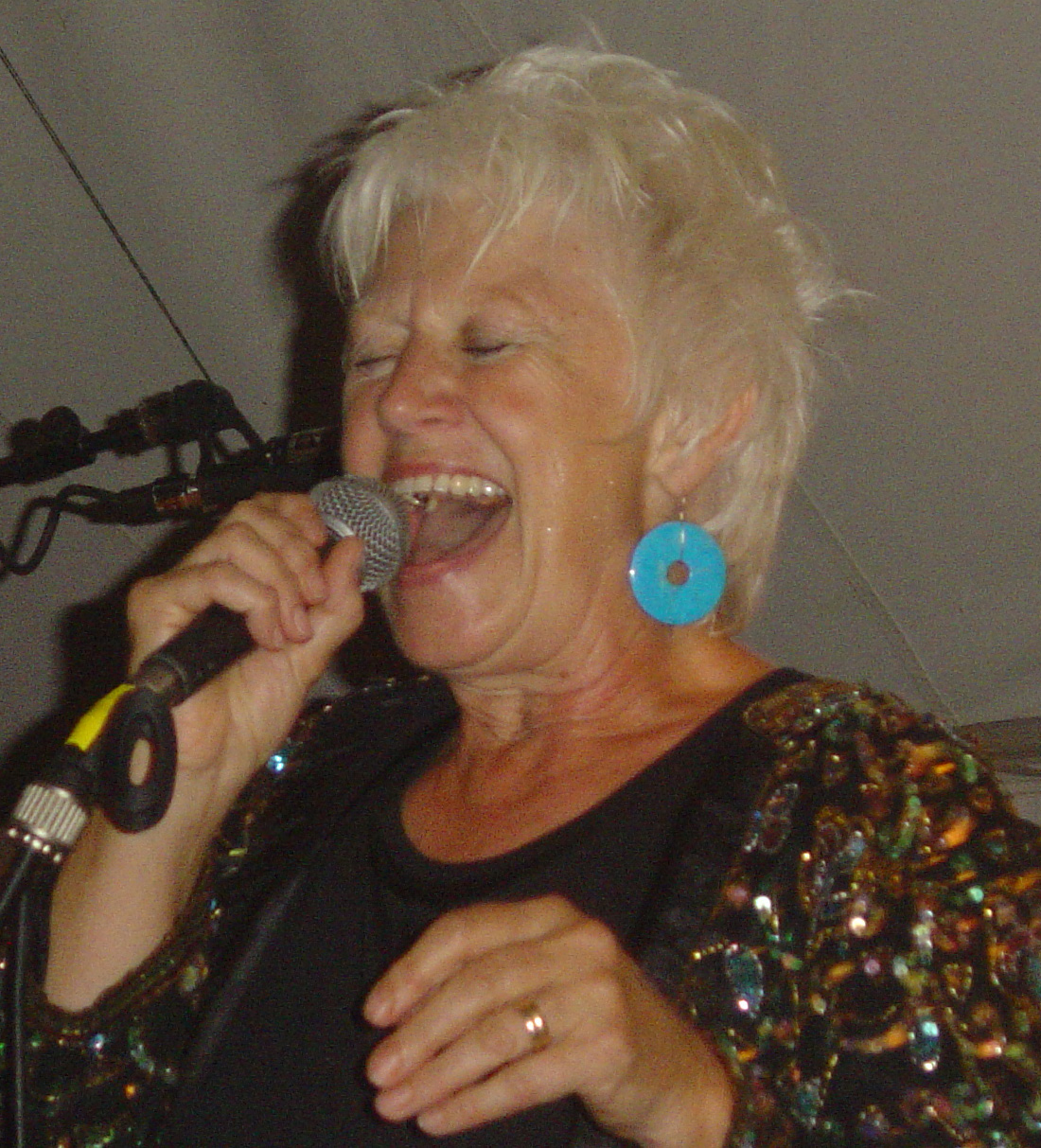
- Hoyle at first Affinity reunion in 2006

Background information
- Born: Linda Hoile; 13 April 1946 (age 80); London, England
- Genre: Jazz rock
- Occupations: Singer, songwriter, art therapist
- Instrument: Vocals
- Years active: 1968–1972; 1984–present
- Labels: Vertigo, Repertoire, Angel Air
- Website: lindahoyle.net

Linda Nicholas (born Linda Hoile, 13 April 1946), known by her stage name Linda Hoyle, is a singer, songwriter and art therapist. She is best known for her work with the band Affinity (1968–1971), as well as for her collaboration with Karl Jenkins on her album Pieces of Me, produced in 1971. Hoyle's latest album, The Fetch, produced by Mo Foster, was released by Angel Air on 7 August 2015. In 2018, she was co-lyricist on a chamber opera, Look! An Opera in 9 Paintings – about a couple on an awkward date at an art gallery – which debuted on June 3, 2018, to sold-out performances at Museum London, Canada.

== Early life and influences ==
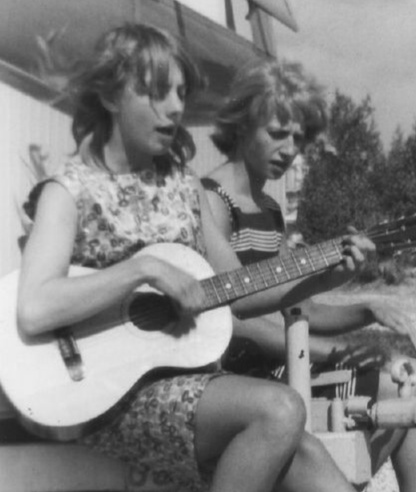
Wendy and Linda c. 1961

Wendy Hoile, Linda's younger sister, was able to sing in harmony from a very young age. She played guitar and sang in a band, Blanch Carter and the Lounge Lizards, in the late 1960s and early 70s. Both Linda and her sister learnt first to play the ukulele and then the guitar. They performed together often at family gatherings and parties, sometimes using the family convector heater, a Valor, as a primitive piece of echo and reverb equipment, singing into it even when it was lit.

== Musical career ==
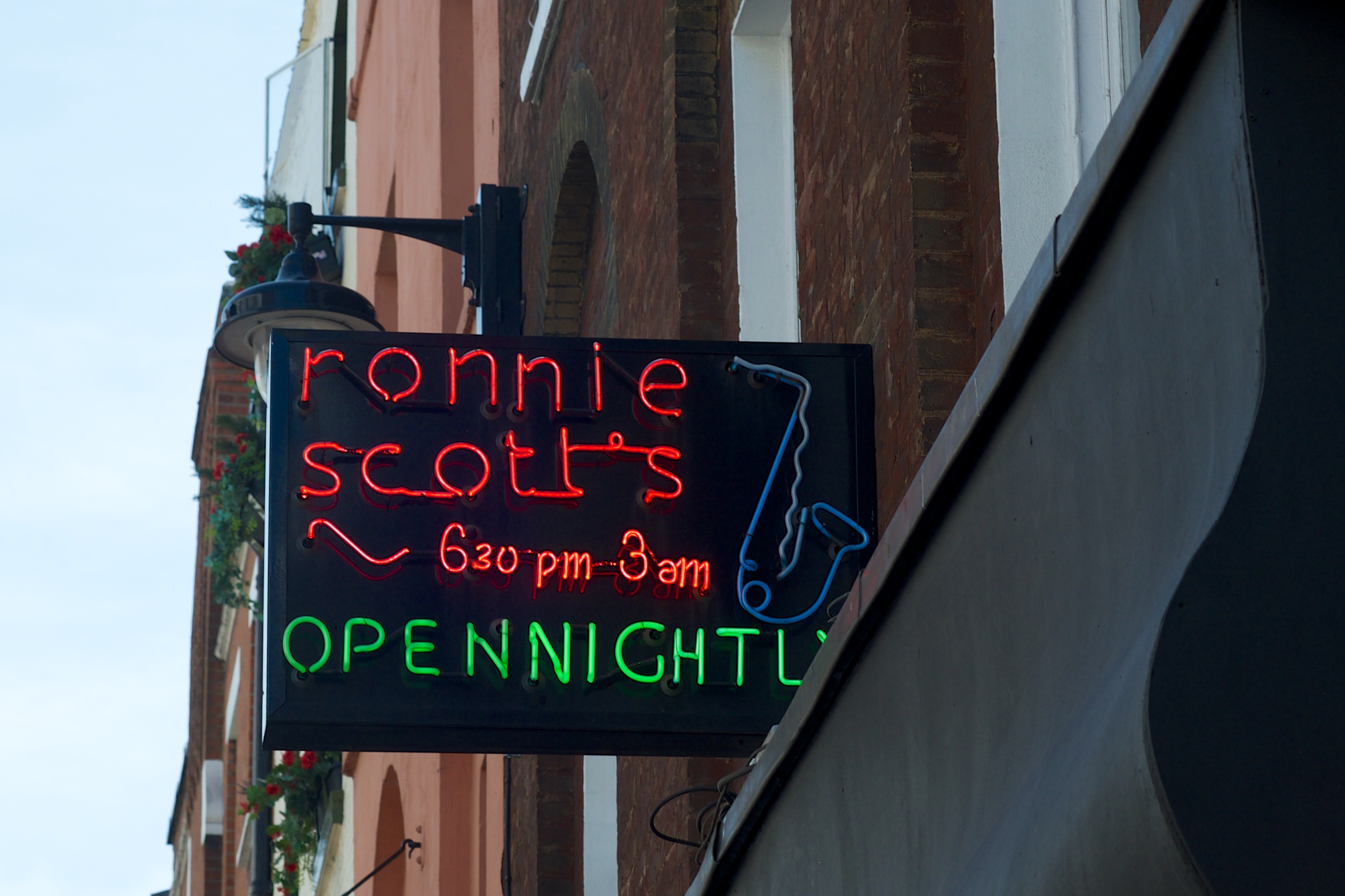
Ronnie Scott's Jazz Club

Foster, in many ways the most enterprising member, introduced the band to Ronnie Scott's management, who at the time were looking for new bands to play Upstairs at their renovated club. Almost immediately signed, they spent three years under contract, starting early in 1969. By the middle of that year, Scott's decided that Affinity should also play Downstairs, opposite such jazz musicians as Les McCann and Stan Getz. This encouraged them to become more demanding of their own musical creativity. At the time of Affinity's appearance opposite McCann in July 1969, Hoyle was interviewed by Melody Maker and spoke about her musical influences and her time with the band.

During this time Affinity were managed by Chips Chipperfield, who later produced The Beatles Anthology, a documentary series for television.

The album Affinity was released in 1970. Affinity's contract with Vertigo, a branch of Philips Records, included an advance payment, which allowed them to buy new equipment and a more comfortable six-wheel vehicle, and to employ a roadie. The band were busy with TV appearances, and touring in the UK and Europe; even so they were finding it hard to live on their earnings. In her interview with Jackie magazine in December 1970, Hoyle talked about the upsides and downsides of life on the road.

The same year Hoyle recorded the jingle for a Shredded Wheat television commercial "There are two men in my life" with Foster and Mike Jopp, both playing acoustic guitars. The commercial achieved much attention in the UK and Hoyle performed the song on the Michael Parkinson Show.

Annie Nightingale, a BBC presenter, travelled with the band in January 1971, making a film about their life on the road for TV. However, at this time Hoyle's three-year relationship with Naiff was coming to an end and she was ready to quit the band.

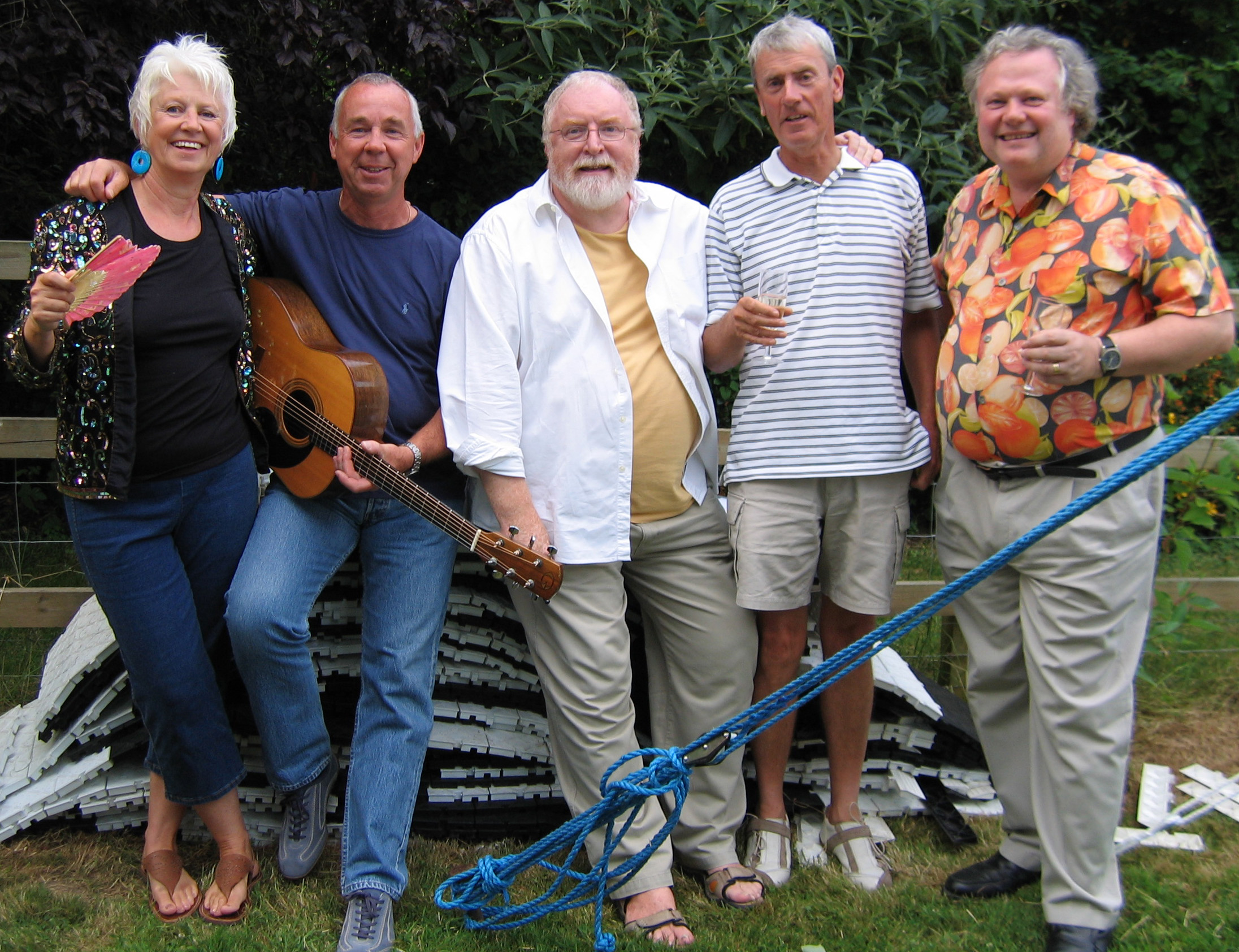
Affinity reunion at a private party in 2006 (L to R: Linda Hoyle, Mike Jopp, Mo Foster, Grant Serpell and Geoff Castle, replacing Lynton Naiff)

In 1971 Ronnie Scott suggested that Hoyle work with Karl Jenkins on a solo album. They wrote many of the songs together and Jenkins invited Chris Spedding, John Marshall, and Jeff Clyne, all from Nucleus, among others to play on the album. Only 300 copies of the album, Pieces of Me, were pressed. It is one of Vertigo's rarest albums.

Hoyle emigrated to Canada in 1972, where she continued to sing, mostly jazz, with various musicians. During a sabbatical year in England in 1980, Hoyle performed and sang with the People Show. People Show No 84 (The Bridge), was staged at the Royal Court Theatre, London and the Crucible, Sheffield. Since 1984, Hoyle has sung and worked with Oliver Whitehead. Hoyle's return to writing and recording was sparked by an Affinity reunion at a private party in 2006. After performing again with Foster at Sussex University's 50th anniversary celebration in 2011 (this performance released as The Baskervilles Reunion 2011), work on The Fetch began. The songs on this album are all original, composed by Foster or Whitehead, with lyrics by Hoyle. The musicians include Ray Russell, Gary Husband, B. J. Cole, Peter Van Hooke and Julian Littman. The album was released in 2015 by Angel Air.

== Art therapy ==
Hoyle received an Honours BA in psychology in 1975, and a master's degree in Biomedical Ethics in 1982, both from the University of Western Ontario. She worked as a therapist in various agencies, and trained in Art Therapy with Irene Dewdney (1914–1999). They remained colleagues and co-workers for the rest of Dewdney's life. With Dewdney and others, she started The Ontario Art Therapy Association in 1979. In 1988 Hoyle was invited to establish the Post Graduate Diploma in Art Therapy at the University of Western Ontario, running the programme and teaching. She co-authored, with Dewdney an art therapy textbook, Drawing Out The Self: The Objective Approach in Art Therapy, which was published in 2011, together with an accompanying Web site.

== Discography ==
=== Albums ===
- Affinity (1970) (Vertigo 6360 004) – by Affinity
- Pieces of Me (1971) (Vertigo 6360 060) – with Karl Jenkins, Chris Spedding, Jeff Clyne and John Marshall
- The Baskervilles Reunion 2011 (Angel Air 2012) – with Mo Foster, Grant Serpell, Ray Russell, Glyn James, John Carter, Mike Jopp, Gary Husband, Andy Brentnall and Brian Davis
- The Fetch (Angel Air 2015) – solo album

=== Album re-issues ===
- Affinity was re-issued in 2006 under the name Affinity Mark-2: Linda Hoyle Years as part of a 5-CD limited collectors edition by the Japanese AMR "Archive" label

=== Compilations and remixes ===
- "Lonely Women" from Pieces of Me was reproduced on Sassafras & Moonshine: The Songs of Laura Nyro (2012)
- "Morning for One" from Pieces of Me, "Three Sisters" and "I Am and So Are You" from Affinity, were used by Andy Votel in his remix album Vertigo Mixed

=== Singles ===
- "I Wonder If I Care As Much" / "Three Sisters" (1970) (Vertigo 6059 007) – by Affinity
- "Eli's Coming" / "United States of Mind" (1970) (Vertigo 6059 018) − by Affinity

== Television appearances ==
- 1970 onwards – The UK Shredded Wheat commercial "There are two men in my life"
- 1970, 21 June – Disco 2 with Affinity
- 1971 – Annie Nightingale's programme about Affinity
- 1971 – Sez Les (Series 3)
- 1971 – Michael Parkinson Show
- 1972, 2 May – The Old Grey Whistle Test (singing "Marty Mole", "Black Crow" and "Paper Tulips")
