= Time to Think (Mo Foster album) =

Live album by Mo Foster
- Released: 2002
- Recorded: July 28–29, 1999
- Venue: St. Michael's Church, Summertown, Oxford, England
- Genre: Jazz fusion, rock, ambient
- Length: 60:10
- Label: Primrose Hill
- Producer: Mo Foster

Mo Foster chronology
| Southern Reunion (1991) | Time to Think (2002) | Live at Blues West 14 (2006) |

Time to Think is a live album by Mo Foster. Most of the tracks were written while Foster was on a trip to New Zealand. The album was conceived as a soundscape of acoustic instruments and to that end was recorded in a small Oxfordshire church that was chosen for its acoustics.

== Track listing ==
1. "Its About That Time of Day" – 5:29
2. "Leo" – 5:37
3. "Omapere Dawn" – 4:35
4. "On Frith Street" – 5:42
5. "Mangonui" – 6:27
6. "Guardians" – 5:59
7. "Waves II" – 1:48
8. "Shades of Grey" – 3:49
9. "Let's Go On Somewhere" – 5:38
10. "The Long Man of Wilmington" – 6:16
11. "A Notional Anthem" – 5:05
12. "Time to Think" – 3:32

== Personnel ==
- Mo Foster – bass guitar, fretless bass, five-string bass
- Iain Ballamy – soprano saxophone
- Simon Chamberlain - piano, church organ
- Ray Russell – acoustic guitar
- Frank Ricotti – vibraphone, percussion
