= RMS (band) =

English jazz fusion supergroup

- RMS; L-R: Ray Russell, Mo Foster, Simon Phillips

Background information
- Origin: London, UK
- Genres: Jazz fusion
- Years active: 1982–1984, 2006–present
- Labels: MMC, Angel Air
- Members: Ray Russell; Gary Husband
- Past members: Simon Phillips; Mo Foster

RMS is an English jazz fusion supergrpup formed in 1982. It consisted of three well known and acclaimed British session musicians. Guitarist, Ray Russell, bass player, Mo Foster and drummer Simon Phillips.

As of mid-2007, RMS have started touring the UK. Due to his commitments with Toto, Simon Phillips has been replaced by Gary Husband. They have performed a few small shows in the south of England with further shows planned throughout the UK in 2008.

== Discography ==
- Centennial Park (1984, 2004)
- RMS Live at the Venue 1982 (2005)
- RMS Live at the Montreux Jazz Festival 1983 (with Gil Evans) (DVD, 2006)
