= The Story of I =

Logo. Circle above a rod shape which broadens right as it approaches the circle

Studio album by Patrick Moraz
- Released: April 1976
- Recorded: Autumn 1975
- Studios: Aquarius Studio, Geneva
- Genres: Progressive rock; world music; jazz fusion
- Length: 46:17
- Labels: Charisma; Atlantic (US/Canada)
- Producer: Patrick Moraz

Patrick Moraz chronology
(1976)	Out in the Sun (1977)

, commonly known as The Story of I, is the first solo album by Swiss keyboard player Patrick Moraz, released in April 1976. It is a concept album centering on a building which people enter and ascend to fulfill their dreams, dying when they reach the top. Because the album's title (which is also the name of the fictional building) consists of a symbol which does not appear on any standard keyboard, journalists adopted "The Story of I" as an unofficial title for the work to more easily refer to it. The album was recorded during a break from Moraz's band Yes when each member of Yes recorded a solo album. It consists of a single song which, at over 46 minutes, is the longest song recorded by Yes or any of its members to date.

== Background and concept ==
After the success of Relayer, Yes next made a decision that each member would make a solo album. The Story of I is the first solo album by Patrick Moraz. By the time the album was released, Moraz was still touring with Yes, but he was let go by the band in late 1976, during the Going for the One recording sessions in Switzerland.

The album is based around a story, written by Moraz himself, of a massive tower in the middle of a jungle. The tower lures people from all over the world to go inside it because it is the only place where they can fulfill their dreams and ambitions. Those who enter the tower are faced with increasingly difficult challenges as they ascend, and their emotions and experiences are broadcast for the entertainment of those who remain outside the building. All those who enter must ascend until they reach the top, where attendants push them out onto a diving board to dive to their deaths. Their bodies are then reconstituted inside a similar underground building where, according to the story "the reconstituted diver will experience the inverse of the previous conditions." However, a variation of the norm occurs: Two people in the tower fall in love and decide to take the final dive together. As the lovers step off the diving board, they are carried off by their love and vanish into the skies.

Since the album's title cannot be typed on any standard keyboard, it has come to be known as The Story of I. The origin of this title is unclear, since the phrase "The Story of I" does not appear on the album or its packaging.

Moraz received the inspiration for the album's concept while riding an elevator in a newly built hotel in the United States. The text of the album's story in fact initially calls the fictional building a hotel. Moraz wrote the story as an allegory for life and the afterlife.

The album, particularly the percussion section, is strongly influenced by Brazilian music. Much of the Latin percussion was recorded in Rio de Janeiro over two days in August 1975 and dubbed on to the tracks. The wordless vocal passage which occurs at a little less than four minutes into the song was influenced by Yes's music.

Moraz invited Robert Moog (inventor of the Moog synthesizer, which Moraz had used extensively through his career) to the recording sessions, and Moog spent three weeks with Moraz, making considerable contributions to the synthesizer sounds used on the album.

== Reception ==
Professional ratings
Review scores
Source	Rating
Allmusic	3/5 stars

The Story of I was chosen as the album of the year by Keyboard Magazine.

Allmusic's retrospective review praised the album's blending of styles, finding in the various tracks "hints of funk and marimba, Caribbean and South American styles, and even flamenco, all guided by Moraz's whirlwind keyboard playing." They also made special note of Andy Newmark's drumming and the strong variety of instruments, and concluded, "The Story of I is a refreshing twist from this progressive craftsman and can sincerely be appreciated by all audiences." Paul Stump wrote in his History of Progressive Rock that while it falls into the genre of jazz rock rather than progressive rock, "every Yes fan should hear The Story of i, as it points a direction in which the band could have gone that might have prolonged the intense music of Relayer and conceivably taken mainstream rock music down a wholly new track."

== Track listing ==
As explained by the liner notes, the album is broken up into 14 tracks for the listener to more easily follow along with the concept, but consists of a single song. Some of the tracks are further divided into sub-sections.

The song's music and the French lyrics on the "Intermezzo" section were written by Patrick Moraz, and the English lyrics were written by John McBurnie.

No.	Title	Length
1.	"" a. "Impact" (3:31) b. "Warmer Hands" (3:31) c. "The Storm" (0:52) d. "Cachaça (Baião)" (4:07) e. "Intermezzo" (2:49) (Note: The lyrics to this track appear under the titles "Another Dog" and "Reflection" in the liner notes.) f. "Indoors" (3:44) I. "Interaction" (1:37) II. "Imps' Dance" (2:07) (Note: The lyrics to this sub-section appear under the title "Confusion - Noisufnoc" in the liner notes.) g. "Best Years of Our Lives" (3:59) h. "Descent" (1:43) i. "Incantation (Procession)" (1:51) (includes a brief piece of a field recording of Amazon Indian music) j. "Dancing Now" (4:38) k. "Impressions (The Dream)" (2:49) l. "Like a Child in Disguise" (4:05) m. "Rise and Fall" (5:34) I. "Degenerescence of Love Theme No III" (0:41) II. "Magic Preparation Dance" (1:24) III. "The Last Call to Destiny" (1:10) IV. "The Final Push from the Imps onto the Diving Board" (2:19) n. "Symphony in the Space" (2:56)"	46:17

== Personnel ==
- Patrick Moraz – keyboards, backing vocals, alpine horn, (Note: The main credits do not mention this instrument, but an asterisked footnote to the "keyboards" credit lists alpine horn as one of the instruments played by Moraz on the album.) marimbaphone, additional percussion, arrangements, orchestrations, production
- John McBurnie – lead vocals
- Vivienne McAuliffe – lead and backing vocals
- Ray Gomez – electric guitars
- Auguste De Anthony – acoustic and electric guitars
- Jeff Berlin – bass
- Alphonse Mouzon – drums (a–g)
- Andy Newmark – drums (h–n)
- Jean-Luc Bourgeois – gongs, tam-tams
- Jean Ristori – engineer, cello, acoustic string bass
- Philippe Staehli – tympanis, percussion
- Rene Moraz – tap dance, castanets
- Chris Penycate – engineer

The Percussionists of Rio de Janeiro

- Gilson de Freitas – leader
- Paulinho Braga – drums
- Hermes – tumba
- Chico Batera – various percussion
- Gordinho and Claudio – surdos
- Bezerra – corte
- Doutor – ripique
- Nenem – cuica
- Jorginho – pandeiro
- Wilson – ganzá
- Geraldo Sabino – frigideira
- Risadinha – reco-reco
- Jorge Garcia – agogo
- Marcal, Luna, and Elizeu – tambourines

== Charts ==
Chart (1976)	Peak position
US Billboard 200	132

Chart (2019)	Peak position
UK Rock & Metal Albums (Official Charts)	34

== In popular culture ==
- Sections of the album were used as background music in the first radio series of The Hitchhiker's Guide to the Galaxy, e.g. Cachaça (Baião) used as a loop behind the news bulletin about Zaphod Beeblebrox stealing the Heart of Gold spaceship in Fit The Second.
