= Oliver Whitehead =

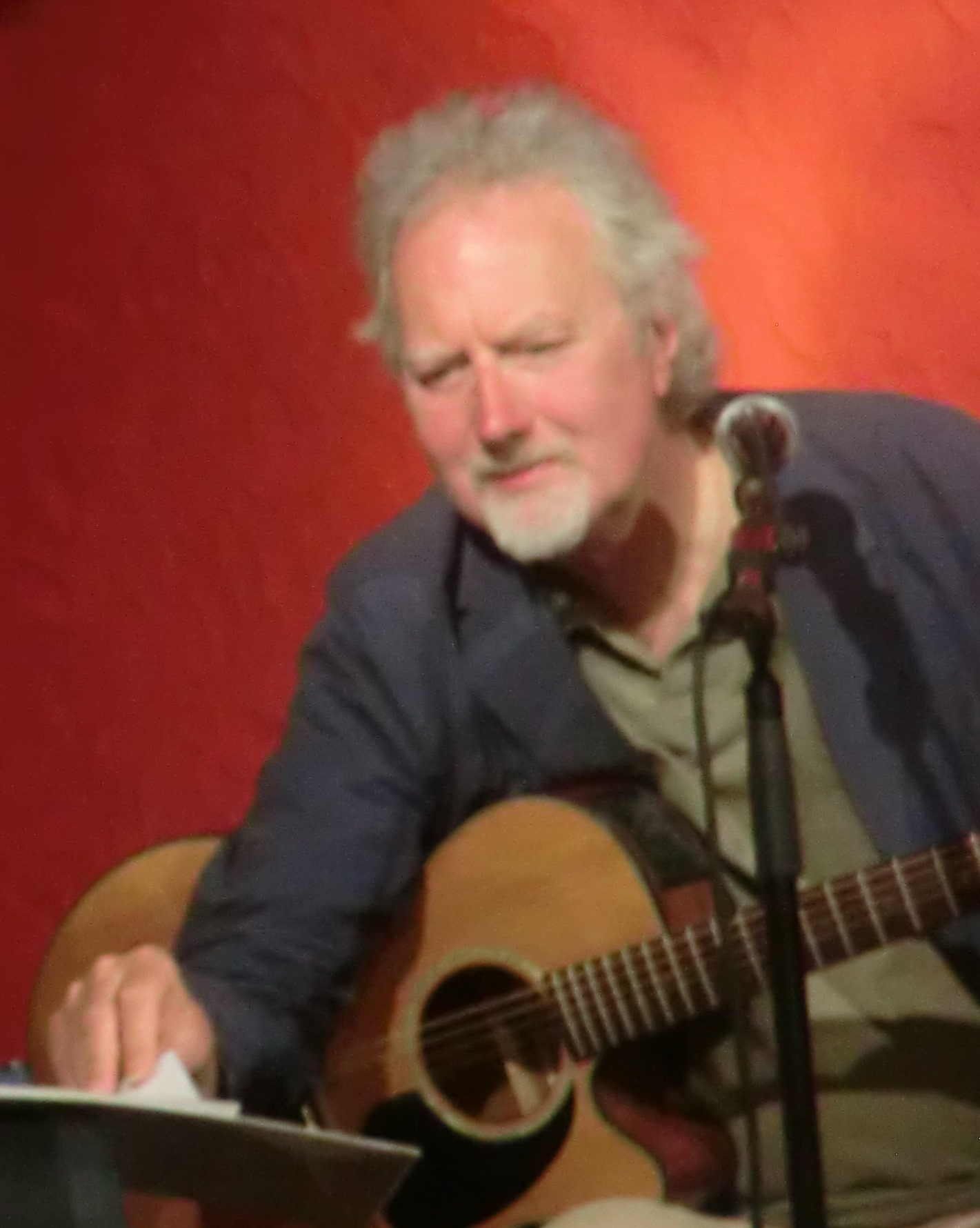
- Oliver Whitehead in 2013

Background information
- Born: 29 August 1948 (age 78); Oxford, England, United Kingdom
- Genres: Jazz, classical
- Occupations: Guitarist, composer, teacher
- Instrument: Guitar
- Years active: 1968–present
- Labels: Justin Time, IBS, Angel Air
- Formerly of: The Antler River Project

Oliver Whitehead is a guitarist and composer, originally from England, who has worked mostly in Canada. He is an Associate Composer at the Canadian Music Centre. His orchestral works include the oratorio We Shall be Changed (1993), Concerto For Oboe (1996) and Pissarro Landscapes (2000). His jazz album Free For Now was nominated for a Juno Award as Best Jazz Album of 1985. He has composed for, and played with, many individual musicians and groups over the years, most recently world music/jazz group The Antler River Project, the singer Linda Hoyle and the music producer and songwriter/composer Mo Foster. The Fetch, an album of original songs by Linda Hoyle, Mo Foster and Whitehead, was released in August 2015. In 2018, Whitehead's first opera, Look! An Opera in 9 Paintings – about a couple on an awkward date at an art gallery – was debuted to sold-out performances at Museum London in London, Ontario, Canada. Whitehead collaborated with Hoyle on the libretto.

== Early life and influences ==
Oliver's father Henry Whitehead was a mathematician at Balliol College, Oxford, and a codebreaker at Bletchley Park during World War II. His son knew almost nothing of the latter fact until 1995, three decades after his father's death, when the Official Secrets Act on WWII service expired. His mother Barbara began a career as a concert pianist (under her maiden name Smyth), but spent most of the 1950s and 60s running a farm that the family bought in the tiny village of Noke, near Oxford. Barbara's first cousin was the operatic tenor Peter Pears, partner of composer Benjamin Britten. Pears and Britten were close with the Whiteheads, often exchanging visits.

Oliver grew up in a home where classical music was highly valued—and jazz was little understood and rarely played. His parents tried to give him formal piano lessons. Instead, Oliver taught himself guitar and, by means of the radio and his wind-up 78 rpm gramophone, soon discovered all the British chart-toppers of the day, such as Tommy Steele, Lonnie Donegan and Cliff Richard, later finding more advanced models in Andres Segovia and Django Reinhardt.

After his father's early death in 1959, when Oliver was 11, his mother increasingly spent time in Donegal, Ireland, where she had holidayed as a child, eventually moving there permanently in 1970. Traditional Irish tunes became another ingredient in Oliver's mental music box.

The only guitar lesson Oliver ever took was from Julian Bream, who showed him a few blues and jazz licks, during a Christmas party with Britten and Pears in 1962.

At school, Oliver and his friends (including blues singer-guitarist Giles Hedley) shared a passionate love of blues and folk, mostly American. He came to the US at age 17, to study literature at Princeton University, where his father had worked for many years at the Institute for Advanced Study. In 1970 he moved to Canada to pursue post-graduate studies at the University of Toronto.

== Musical career ==
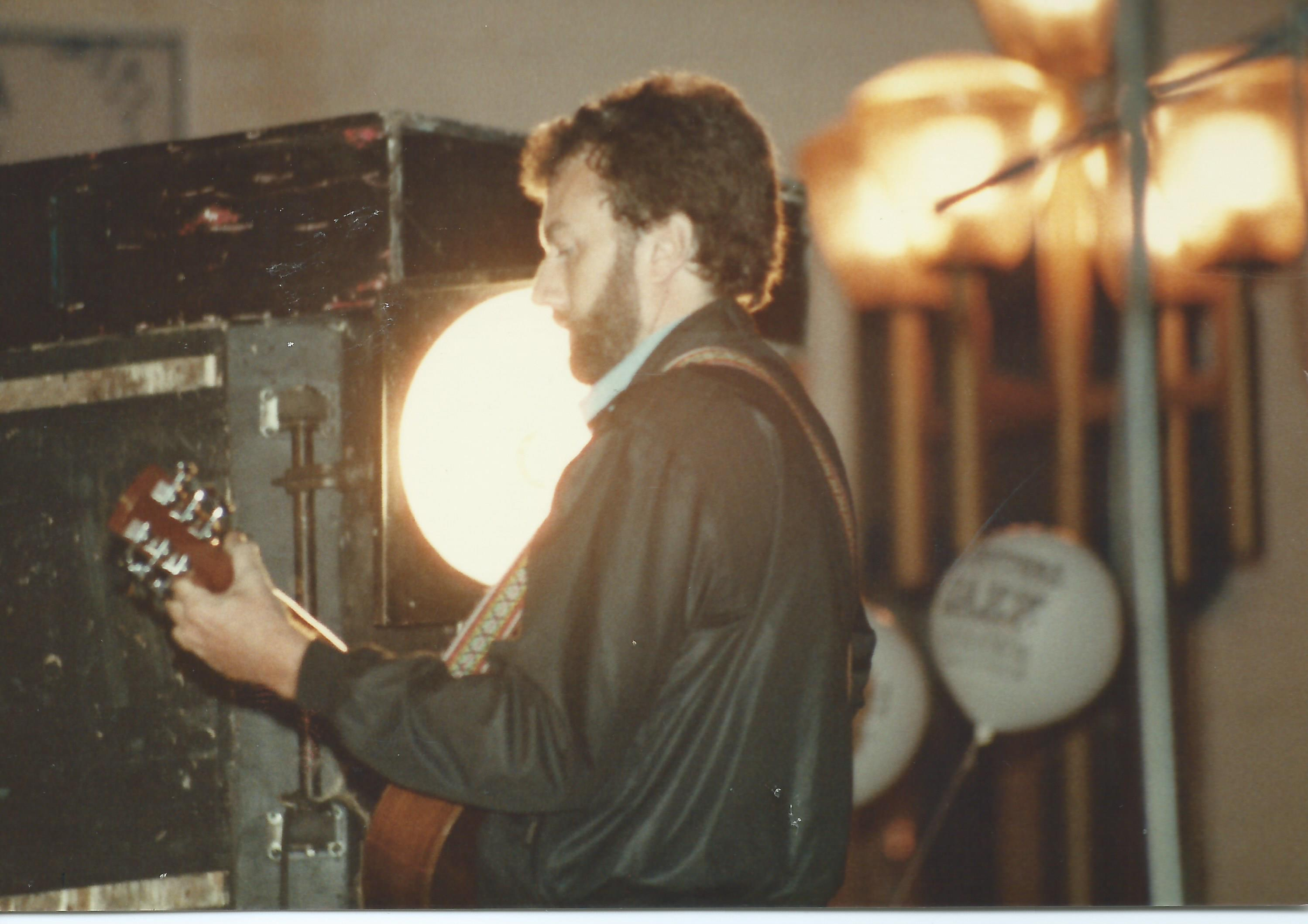
Oliver Whitehead at Montreal Jazz Festival 1983

In 1978, Whitehead moved to London, Ontario to take up an academic post at Western University. With the encouragement of some new friends there, he began to play and compose jazz for the first time, and formed the Oliver Whitehead Quintet (1983–1990), fronted by sax player Chris Robinson, to play original compositions by him and pianist Patrick Dubois. Their first LP was encouragingly nominated for Best Jazz Album in Canada's Juno Award of 1985. The quintet played twice at the Montreal International Jazz Festival, as well as other jazz fests in Detroit, Toronto, Ottawa, Edmonton and Vancouver.

By 1997, Whitehead was incorporating more world music elements in his compositions, beginning with The Mass For All Creatures, a full length mass commissioned for a Blessing of the Animals ceremony, for child and adult choirs, and instrumentation that included African percussion and Celtic harp. The key players in that work went on to form The Antler River Project, which continues to play original jazz/world music compositions by Whitehead and pianist Steve Holowitz.

Whitehead wrote his first classical / art music piece—the oratorio We Shall Be Changed—in 1993, on commission from Pro Musica and Orchestra London Canada. That oratorio is based on the book Cosmic Consciousness by Richard Maurice Bucke, an early 20th-century psychiatrist and mystic who lived in London, Ontario. Other classical commissions followed, described in the list below.

== Teaching ==
Whitehead has never taught music. After completing a PhD in Comparative Literature at the University of Toronto, under Northrop Frye, he began in 1978 to teach English and Comparative Literature and Culture, at Western University in London, Ontario, and continued for the next 35 years. Although he started as a full-timer, he resigned in 1988, to take up year-to-year, part-time contracts at the university, to devote more time to music. Over the years, his teaching course load focused on Shakespeare, Foundations of Literature (Homer, Virgil the Bible, Renaissance) and Literature and Music; as well as general survey courses. The field of Comparative Literature allowed him the freedom to break traditional academic boundaries by incorporating all the art forms, especially music, in his courses.

== Personal life ==
Whitehead has been married since 1984 to Mary Malone, a journalist and communications project manager from Montreal. They have two daughters, Anne and Claire. He is a cryptic crossword addict.

== Discography ==
=== Compositions performed by his musical ensembles ===
Year	Album	Performers & notes	Label
1984	Free For Now	The Oliver Whitehead Quintet nominated for the 1985 Juno award – Best Jazz Album	Justin Time
1985	Pulse/Impulse	The Oliver Whitehead Quintet	Justin Time
1998	The Mass For All Creatures	The St. Francis Ensemble	
1998	Resonance	Oliver Whitehead and Marg Stowe	
2011	Latitude 43	The Antler River Project	

=== Compositions performed by other musicians ===
Year	Album	Whitehead tracks	Performers	Notes	Label
1995	Transformations	"We Shall Be Changed" (6 tracks)	London Pro Musica and Orchestra London Canada	An oratorio about Richard Maurice Bucke	IBS
1998	Home Suite Home	"Home Suite Home" (3 tracks)	The Aeolian Winds	A three movement suite for woodwinds	IBS
2007	The Nightingale's Rhapsody	"Pissarro Landscapes" (4 tracks)	Jerome Summers, clarinet	A suite for clarinet, piano and strings, inspired by paintings by Camille Pissarro	Cambria
2015	The Fetch	(6 of 12 tracks) "The Fetch," "Confessional," "Brighton Pier," "It's The World," "Maida Vale," "So Simple," "Acknowledgements"	All lyrics by Linda Hoyle	Sung by Linda Hoyle	Angel Air
2018	Look! An Opera in 9 Paintings	“Arriving,” ”Elmwood Avenue,” “The London Six,” “The White Painting,” “Every Summer.” “Sky Woman,” “Rain,” “Olga and Mary,” “Wheel,” “Dairy Queen,” “Leaving”	Paul Grambo, Sonja Gustafson, Steve Holowitz, Christine Newland	A nine movement opera, with visual projections, about paintings by artists in London, Ontario	Museum London (view opera online)

=== Arrangements for other artists ===
Year	Album	Whitehead tracks	Performers
2001	The World Awaits: Songs for a winter's night	"River" (by Joni Mitchell) "Huron Carol" (by Jean de Brebeuf) "Riu Riu Chiu" (traditional))	Project Sing; Eleven Eleven Productions
2003	Goode Cheare: Christmas celebrations old and new	"Carol of The Birds," "Fum Fum Fum," "All Hail to the Dayes," "Gaudete," "Huron Carol," "Patapan," "Tomorrow Shall Be My Dancing Day," "Carol of the Bells" (all traditional) "In The Bleak Midwinter" (by Gustav Holst)	Guelph Chamber Choir
2008	Songs of the Land	"All The Diamonds in The World" (by Bruce Cockburn) "Early Morning Rain" (co-arranger: Steve Holowitz), If I Could Read Your Mind (both by Gordon Lightfoot) "Night Ride Home," "Big Yellow Taxi" (both by Joni Mitchell) "Sisters of Mercy," "Hey That's No Way To Say Goodbye" (both by Leonard Cohen) "Helpless" (by Neil Young)	London Pro Musica

== Compositions ==
=== Jazz ===
- Latitude 43 (2011): Played by The Antler River Project (guitar, keyboards, flute, bass, drums, percussion). Whitehead compositions include: "Altitude," "Early Snow," "The River Suite" (movements 1 and 2) "Dusty Feet," "Whirlpool," "African Galliard," "El Jefe" (with co-composer Steve Holowitz).
- Resonance (1985): Played by Oliver Whitehead and Marg Stowe (two guitars). Whitehead compositions include: "Seen Through Green;" "Life Won't Stand Still;" "Plain and Simple;" "By The Sea;" and these titles, co-composed with Marg Stowe: "Openings," "Folie A Deux," "The House of the Spirits."
- Pulse/Impulse (1985): Played by the Oliver Whitehead Quintet (guitar, keyboards, saxophone, bass, drums). Whitehead compositions include: "The Leopard Hunts," "Street Level," "Green Shade," "Touch The Heart" (with co-composer Patrick Dubois).
- Free For Now (1984): Played by the Oliver Whitehead Quintet (guitar, keyboards, saxophone, bass, drums). Whitehead compositions include: "Free For Now," "Six String Waltz," "Excuses, Excuses," "Woman In Blue," "Crazy Season." Liner notes by Katie Malloch of CBC Radio.

=== Pop / Rock ===
- The Fetch (2015) : All songs include lyrics written and sung by Linda Hoyle. Whitehead compositions: “The Fetch,” “Confessional,” “Brighton Pier,” “It’s The World,” “Maida Vale,” “So Simple,” “Acknowledgements.” Played by several musicians in Canada and England. Instrumentation includes: guitars, bass (acoustic, electric and fretless), drums, percussion, cello, piano, keyboards, church organ, mandolin, accordion, electric sitar, soprano sax.

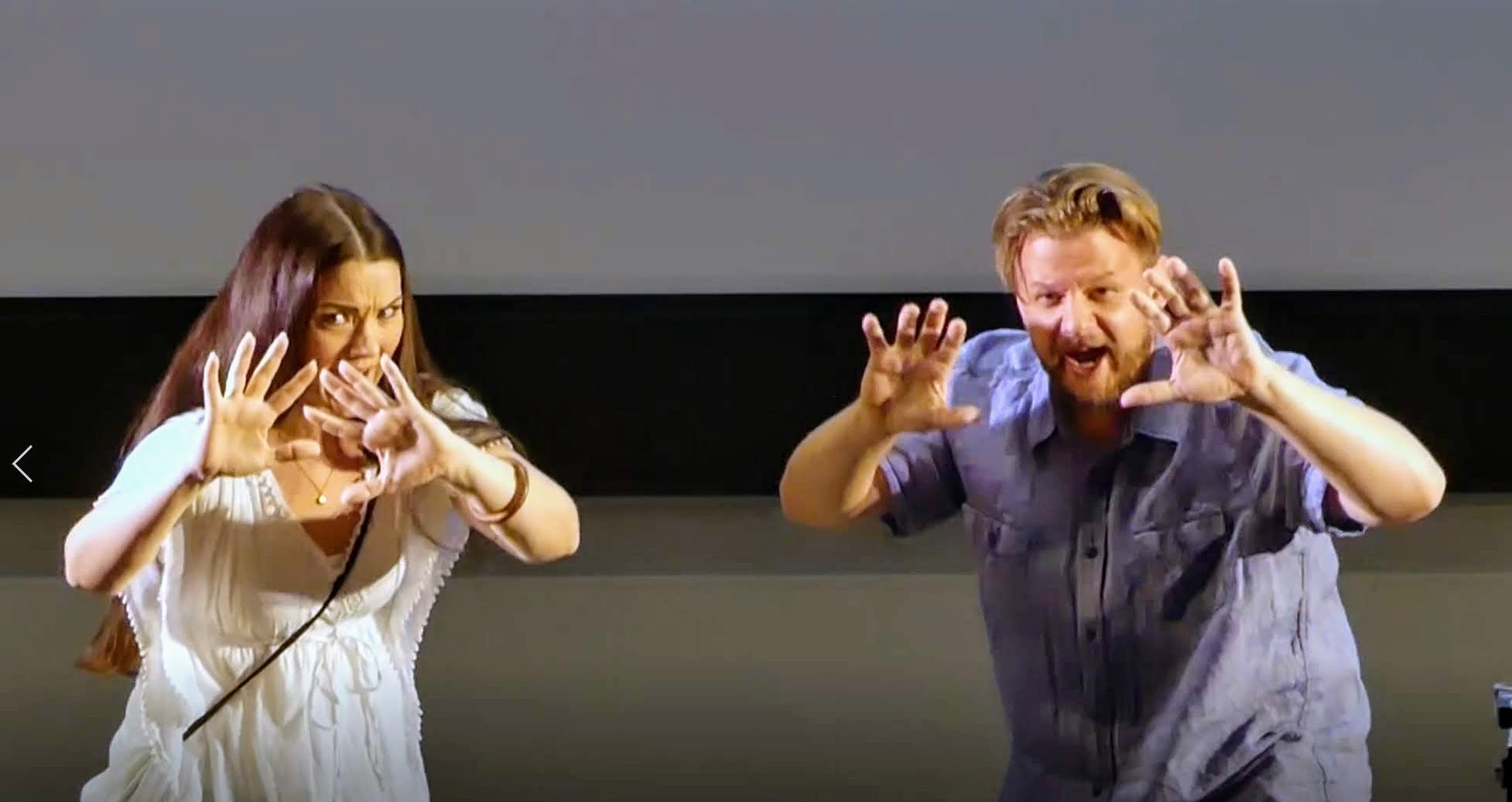
Gustafson and Grambo sing "Rain" in Look! An Opera in 9 Paintings

=== Classical and art music ===
- Look! An Opera in 9 Paintings (2018): A 60 minute chamber opera for soprano and baritone, with piano and cello accompaniment; music and libretto by Oliver Whitehead, with co-lyricist Linda Hoyle and additional lyrics by Claire Whitehead. Supported by the London Arts Council and the Good Foundation Inc. Premiere: 3 June 2018 at Museum London in London, Ontario, Canada.
- Excitations (2012) : A three-movement work for flute and piano. Premièred 9 November 2012. with Fiona Wilkinson, flute, and Mark Payne, piano. Von Kuster Hall, Western University.
- Brushstrokes Decorating A Fan (2008): A song-cycle of seven settings of short poems by James Reaney for Soprano voice, flute, piano and guitar; co-composed with Steven Holowitz. Premiere, 15 February 2008 at First St. Andrew's United Church, London, ON, with Sonja Gustafson, soprano.
- Uhuru Peak (2008): A 15-minute work for cello and orchestra, commissioned by Christine Newland and Orchestra London, and supported by a grant from the Ontario Arts Council. Premiere: 6 June 2008 at the Grand Theatre, London, Ontario.
- The Blue Scales Quintet (2007): Commissioned by CBC Radio for the Ottawa Chamber Music Festival, was composed in 2007 and received its premiere at the festival on 5 August 2008. It is a three-movement piece with many elements drawn from jazz. The mandate of the composition was to use the same instrumentation as Schubert's "Trout" quintet, to which the title punningly refers.
- Pissarro Landscapes (2000): Four pieces for clarinet, piano and string orchestra (length: c.15 m.) Co-commissioned by the International Symphony Orchestra and the Woodstock Strings for Jerome Summers, clarinet. Premiere: 12 February 2000, by the ISO, Port Huron, Michigan. Recorded by Jerome Summers for the Cambria label in Ottawa, April 2006
- The Mass For All Creatures (1997): A world-music mass commissioned by St Paul’s Anglican Cathedral in London, Ontario, written for adult choir, children’s choir and an ensemble of flute, Celtic harp, guitar, piano, bass and 3 percussionists. Premiere: October 1997. Released on CD in the fall of 1998
- Games Without Rules (1997): A Seven-part electro-acoustic composition for MIDI-implemented flute, oboe and sequencer. Premiere by Fiona Wilkinson and Harry Sargous, 5 March 1997
- Concerto For Oboe (1997): Premiered 26 November 1997. Ian Franklin with Orchestra London Canada
- The Sorcerer's Apprentice (1995): A 40-minute electronic ballet score for the Ontario Ballet Theatre. Performed throughout Ontario from Oct.'95 to April '96
- Home/Suite/Home (1994): A suite in five movements for woodwind quintet. It is the title piece on the Aeolian Winds' CD of the same name (released summer 1998) on the IBS label. It has been broadcast twice in its entirety by CBC Radio 2, in performances by the Aeolian Winds: 1) A performance on 30 September 1994. 2) A performance in 1996 in London, Ont
- The Lion, The Witch And The Wardrobe: A ballet adaptation of C.S Lewis's classic children's story, commissioned by the Ontario Ballet Theatre and choreographed by Patti Caplette of the Royal Winnipeg Ballet. The work is approximately forty minutes in length.
- We Shall Be Changed (1993): An oratorio in six movements (43 minutes) for choir with symphony orchestra, premiered by London Pro Musica and Orchestra London in May 1993.
- Aladdin: A forty-minute ballet score for the Ontario Ballet Theatre. Choreographed by Patti Caplette.
- The Wind In The Willows: A 40-minute electronic ballet score for the Ontario Ballet Theatre
- Childhood Musette (1992): A setting of James Reaney's poem for voice and piano, performed by Ernest Redekop in "The Great Reaney Suite," 16 February 1992, Von Kuster Hall, UWO
- Rapunzel: A 40-minute electronic score for the Ontario Ballet Theatre.
- The Magic Flute: A 40-minute electronic ballet for the Ontario Ballet Theatre
