= Out in the Sun =

Studio album by Patrick Moraz
- Released: August 1977
- Recorded: February–March 1977
- Studio: Phonogram Studios (Rio de Janeiro, Brazil); Aquarius Studios (Geneva, Switzerland)
- Genre: Progressive rock; Latin; jazz fusion
- Length: 40:21
- Label: Charisma (UK & Europe); Import (USA)
- Producer: Patrick Moraz; Jean Ristori

Patrick Moraz chronology
The Story of I (1976)	Out in the Sun (1977)	Patrick Moraz (1978)

Professional ratings
Review scores
Source	Rating
AllMusic	4/5 stars

Out in the Sun is the second album by Swiss keyboard player Patrick Moraz, released in August 1977. Record Collector writes that, alongside its predecessor The Story of I (1976), Out in the Sun anticipates "the world music preoccupations of the 80s by several years."

== Track listing ==
1. "Out in the Sun" (Patrick Moraz, John McBurnie) – 4:27
2. "Rana Batacuda" (Moraz) – 5:33
3. "Nervous Breakdown" (Moraz, McBurnie) – 3:23
4. "Silver Screen" (Moraz, McBurnie) – 4:32
5. "Tentacles" (Moraz, McBurnie) – 3:32
6. "Kabala" (Moraz) – 4:57
7. "Love-Hate-Sun-Rain-You" (Moraz, François Zmirou) – 4:51
8. "Time for a Change" – 9:06
  1. "Time to Fly" (Moraz)
  2. "Big Bands of Ancient Temples" (Moraz)
  3. "Serenade" (Moraz)
  4. "Back to Nature" (Moraz, McBurnie)

== Personnel ==
=== Performers ===
- Patrick Moraz – keyboards, vocals, vibraphone, effects
- François Zmirou – vocals ("Love-Hate-Sun-Rain-You")
- John McBurnie – vocals ("Out in the Sun", "Rana Batacuda", "Nervous Breakdown", "Silver Screen", "Tentacles", "Kabala" and "Back to Nature")
- Vivienne McAuliffe – vocals
- Ray Gomez – guitars, mandolin
- Wornell Jones – bass guitar
- Jean Ristori – bass guitar ("Kabala")
- Isla Eckinger – acoustic bass ("Back to Nature")
- Testa Chacal – congas, pandeiro, percussion ("Kabala")
- The Percussionists of Rio de Janeiro – percussion ("Rana Batacuda")
- Phillipe Staehli – timpani ("Time for a Change")
- Andy Newmark – drums

=== Production ===
- Patrick Moraz – producer
- Jean Ristori – producer, engineer
- Erroll Maibach – assistant engineer
- Ray Staff – mastering
- Camille Broye – tape op

== Charts ==
Chart (1977)	Peak position
UK Albums (OCC)	44
