= Affinity (Affinity album) =

Studio album by Affinity
- Released: 1970
- Recorded: 1968–70
- Studio: Trident and Island Studios, London
- Genre: Jazz rock
- Length: 38:16
- Label: Vertigo
- Producer: John Anthony

Affinity chronology
Affinity (1970)	1971–1972 (2003)

Affinity is the debut album by the English jazz rock band Affinity, produced by John Anthony, with a cover design by Marcus Keef.

== Track listing ==
Side one (from original LP)
No.	Title	Writer(s)	Length
1.	"I Am and So Are You"	Alan Hull – Brass arranged by John Paul Jones	3:31
2.	"Night Flight"	Mike Jopp, Linda Hoyle	7:15
3.	"I Wonder If I Care as Much"	Don Everly, Phil Everly – Strings arranged by John Paul Jones	3:20
4.	"Mr. Joy"	Annette Peacock	5:02

Side two (from original LP)
No.	Title	Writer(s)	Length
5.	"Three Sisters"	Lynton Naiff, Linda Hoyle – Brass arranged by Chris Hughes	4:57
6.	"Coconut Grove"	John Sebastian, Zal Yanovsky	2:35
7.	"All Along the Watchtower"	Bob Dylan	11:36

Bonus Tracks on CD
No.	Title	Writer(s)	Length
8.	"Eli's Comin'"	Laura Nyro	3:29
9.	"United States of Mind"	Alan Hull	2:47
10.	"Yes Man"	Mo Foster, Lynton Naiff, Linda Hoyle	7:23
11.	"If You Live"	M. Allison	3:13
12.	"I Am the Walrus"	Lennon/McCartney	4:06
13.	"You Met Your Match"		3:03
14.	"Long Voyage"	Carole King	4:16
15.	"Little Lonely Man"	Mo Foster, Linda Hoyle	3:57

== Critical reception ==
Professional ratings
Review scores
Source	Rating
AllMusic	4/5 stars

On Allmusic, "Affinity" rates 4 out of 5 stars, and is described as "At times overambitious. And a plethora of cover versions given the progressive treatment instead of Affinity originals is a major letdown. But as an early work of post-'60s progression, this album is a pleasurable experience recalling the days when musicians and singers really worked hard at what they did."

== Personnel ==
Affinity

- Linda Hoyle – vocals
- Lynton Naiff – Hammond B3 organ, piano, Wurlitzer electric piano, harpsichord, vibraphone, percussion
- Mo Foster – bass guitar, double bass, percussion
- Mike Jopp – electric, acoustic and 12-string guitars, percussion
- Grant Serpell – drums, percussion

Technical

- Frank Owen, Robin Geoffrey Cable – engineer
- Keith "Keef" MacMillan – album design, photography
