= Affinity (band) =

English jazz-rock band

- Affinity; L-R: Grant Serpell, Mike Jopp, Linda Hoyle; Lynton Naiff, Mo Foster

Background information
- Origin: University of Sussex, Brighton, England
- Genre: Jazz-rock
- Years active: 1968–1972
- Labels: Vertigo, Angel Air
- Spinoff of: US Jazz Trio
- Past members: Vivienne McAuliffe; Dave Watts; Grant Serpell; Mo Foster; Mike Jopp; Lynton Naiff; Linda Hoyle

Affinity were an English jazz-rock band, active from mid-1968 to January 1972.

== History ==
=== Origins ===
The origin of Affinity was circa 1965 in the science department of the University of Sussex in Brighton, England. Three science students Lynton Naiff (keyboards), Grant Serpell (drums), and Nick Nicholas (double bass) had formed the US Jazz Trio, they played at University events and local gigs. When Serpell graduated a year later he was replaced by Mo Foster who had earlier been playing bass guitar in his school band but had now adapted to playing drums.

After university Naiff and Serpell, along with members of other bands gathered from other university bands, formed the pop group Ice. Although Ice was moderately successful commercially it only lasted for about a year before it disbanded.

The auditions continued for a singer. They unanimously decided on an English teacher they had met previously, Linda Hoyle.

After obtaining a loan, which was guaranteed by Jopp's father, they bought the equipment needed to start the band. They bought Impact amplifiers, a Hammond M102 organ, a Gibson EBO bass guitar, some microphones and a grey Ford Transit van. They then spent the summer of 1968 rehearsing, writing, and generally chilling out at a rented bungalow on the edge of Brighton. The first thing they needed to do though was invent a name for themselves, eventually they settled on "Affinity" which came from the name of Oscar Peterson's 1961 LP Affinity.

=== Performances ===
Affinity played their first London show at the Revolution Club in Bruton Place in Mayfair, West End on 5 October 1968.

One of the gigs they were playing at the time was broadcast on BBC Radio Jazz Club. Ronnie Scott, heard a recording of the show and subsequently agreed to manage them. He also agreed to give them regular bookings at his world-famous jazz club.

From this point on they received much live work in London's discotheque and club scene and on the college circuit. They also toured in Europe and Scandinavia and some festivals. They appeared on TV spots, including Disco 2 which was the forerunner to The Old Grey Whistle Test. They recorded the theme for a Shredded Wheat commercial series ("There are 2 men in my life..."). They released an eponymously titled album on the Vertigo label in 1970.

They received many rave reviews, most for the band, but some for individual members, and from Derek Jewell of The Sunday Times, who commented "Naiff is already a virtuoso, soul-style, and the whole group is probably the best new thing heard in the jazz-pop area this year." Billboard Magazine described Naiff as "a musician of great promise". Naiff and Foster had to write a second album when Hoyle announced that she'd had enough and wanted to quit both the band and the music business. Her last concert with Affinity was due to have been in Cardiff on 8 February 1971, but the show was cancelled. The actual last performance was 10 February 1971 in Bournemouth's Winter Gardens theatre.

Between February and June that year the remaining members, along with their new keyboard player Dave Watts, continued to play a mini tour with Geno Washington & The Ram Jam Band.

In June 1971, it was announced that Affinity were reforming, with original members Jopp, Foster and Serpell plus new recruits Vivienne McAuliffe on vocals and ex-Geno Washington organist Dave Watts (Naiff was by now in Abednego, and by the year's end had joined Toe Fat). A five-day tour of the Netherlands beginning late June and work on a new album were announced. However, a few weeks later Jopp, Foster and Serpell had all been enlisted by ex-Manfred Mann singer Mike d'Abo to back him on his upcoming US tour, alongside sax/flautist Jack Lancaster.

== Personnel ==
Former members

- Grant Serpell – drums, percussion (1965–1966, 1968–72, 2006, 2011)
- Lynton Naiff – organ, piano (1965–1966, 1968–70)
- Nick Nicholas – bass guitar (1965–1966)
- Linda Hoyle – vocals (1968–71, 2006, 2011)
- Mike Jopp – guitar (1968–72, 2006, 2011)
- Mo Foster – bass guitar (1966, 1968–72, 2006, 2011; died 2023)
- Dave Watts – organ, piano (1971–72)
- Vivienne McAuliffe – vocals (1971–72; died 1998)
- Geoff Castle – organ, piano (2006)
- Gary Husband – organ, piano (2011)

Timeline

== Discography ==
Although Affinity only actually ever recorded one album at the time they existed, archived tapes have been compiled and released in four Affinity-related albums.

=== Studio albums ===
- Affinity — (1970, Vertigo), (2002, Angel Air)
- 1971–1972 — (Recorded 1971–72, released 2003, Angel Air)

=== Other releases ===
- Live Instrumentals 1969 — (2003, Angel Air)
- Origins 1965–67 — (2004, Angel Air)
- Origins: The Baskervilles 1965 — (2007, Angel Air)

In 2006 a 5-CD limited issue, collectors edition of the Affinity collection was released on the Japanese AMR "Archive" label. It was in a special packaging consisting of a reproduction of the original LP cover, with an expansive write up on the history of Affinity including a Pete Frame-type family tree diagram designed by Mo Foster and Kurt Adkins.

== Album 1971–1972 ==
1971–1972 was meant to be the second studio album by Affinity. It was, eventually, released by Angel Air thirty years later, in 2003.

=== Track listing ===
No.	Title	Writer(s)	Length
1.	"Moira's Hand"	B. A. Robertson	5:21
2.	"Grey Skies"	Mo Foster, Vivienne McAuliffe	8:42
3.	"Cream On Your Face"	Mike Jopp, B. A. Robertson	5:23
4.	"Sunshower"	Jimmy Webb	5:47
5.	"All Along the Watchtower"	Bob Dylan	7:45
6.	"Rio"	Jopp, B. A. Robertson	4:50
7.	"Poor Man's Son"	Mike d'Abo	3:25
8.	"Sarah's Wardrobe"	Foster, Jopp	4:17
9.	"Highgate"	Foster, Jopp	3:56

=== Personnel ===
- Vivienne McAuliffe - vocals
- Dave Watts - Hammond B3 organ, piano, percussion
- Mo Foster - bass guitar, double bass, percussion
- Mike Jopp - electric, acoustic and 12-string guitars, percussion
- Grant Serpell - drums, percussion
