= Mo Foster =

English multi-instrumentalist, record producer and composer (1944–2023)

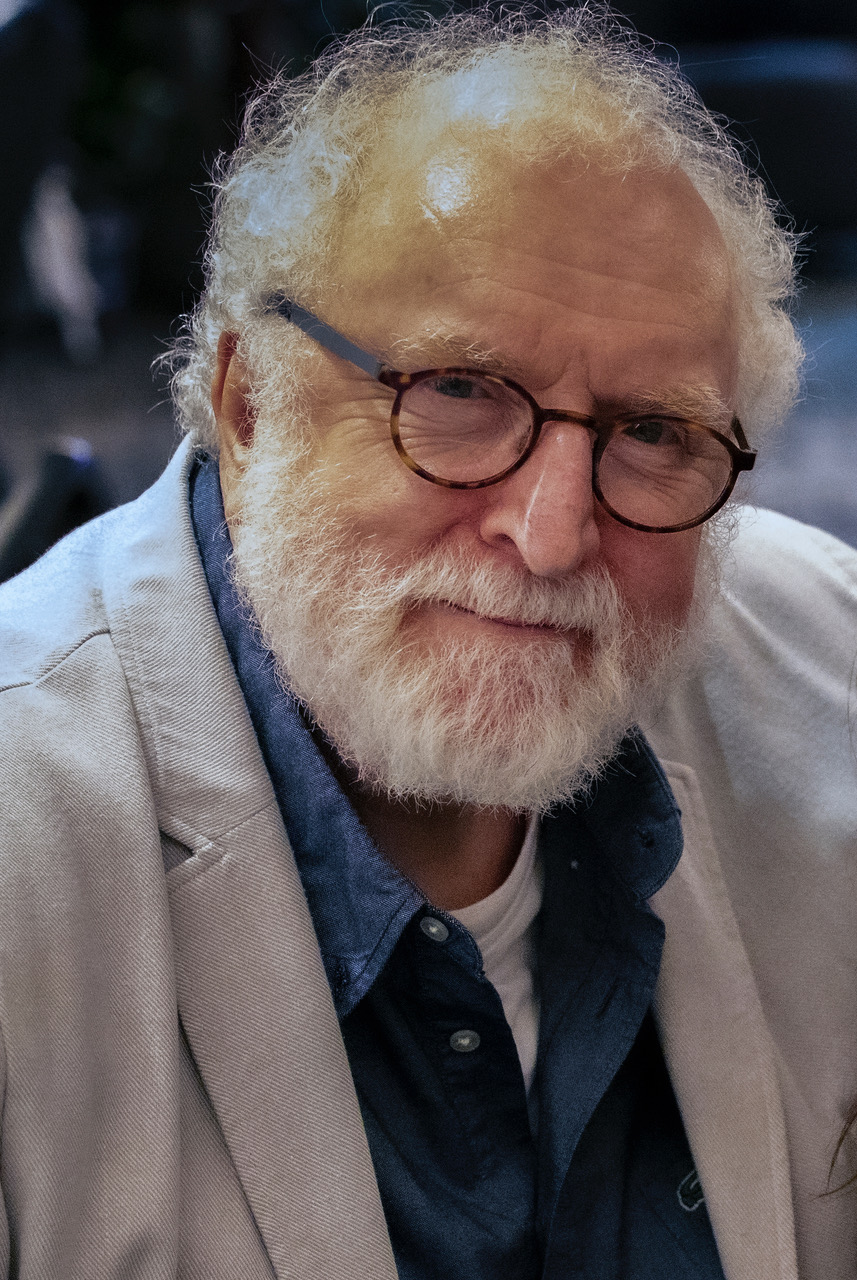
- Foster in 2020
- Born: Michael Ralph Foster; 22 December 1944; Wolverhampton, England
- Died: 3 July 2023 (aged 78)
- Education: University of Sussex
- Spouse: Kay Morgan (m. 1985)
- Awards: BASCA Gold Badge
- Musical career
- Genres: Rock; pop rock; jazz rock; jazz fusion; funk rock
- Occupations: Studio musician; composer; producer; author; bandleader; raconteur
- Instruments: Bass guitar; guitar; double bass; mandolin; drums; percussion; keyboards; recorder
- Years active: 1968–2023
- Labels: Commercial labels: Vertigo; Right Track; Esoteric; Cherry Red; Angel Air / The Store For Music; Pancromatic; MMC / EMI / In-Akustik / Relativity; Repertoire; Spindrift; CD Baby; Primrose Hill; Library labels: Cues4U; Made Up Music / Triumph Music; Anthem / Ole / Imagem / Boosey / Cavendish; Music House / Sony / ATV / EMI; Weinberger / JW Media; Universal / Bruton / KPM / Zomba; The Music Library; Synctracks
- Website: mofoster.com

Michael Ralph "Mo" Foster (22 December 1944 – 3 July 2023) was an English multi-instrumentalist, record producer, composer, solo artist, author, and public speaker. Through a career spanning over half a century, Foster toured, recorded, and performed with dozens of artists, including Jeff Beck, Gil Evans, Gary Moore, Phil Collins, Ringo Starr, Joan Armatrading, Gerry Rafferty, Brian May, Scott Walker, Frida of ABBA, Cliff Richard, George Martin, Van Morrison, Dr John, Hank Marvin, Heaven 17, Véronique Sanson and the London Symphony Orchestra. He released several albums under his own name, authored a humorous book on the history of British rock guitar, written numerous articles for music publications, continued to compose production music, and established himself as a public speaker. Foster was an assessor for JAMES, an industry organisation that gives accreditation to music colleges throughout the United Kingdom. In 2014, Foster was a recipient of a BASCA Gold Badge Award to honour his lifelong contribution to the British songwriting and composing community.

== Early years ==
Mo Foster grew up in the post-war environment of Wolverhampton, a large town in the industrial English West Midlands. Although not having any music in the home, he picked up the recorder at school when he was about nine years old and taught himself.

When he graduated from his primary school in Wolverhampton to the grammar school in the village of Brewood, Staffordshire, where there was no music department. He could study Latin, art, science, English, mathematics, and agriculture – but not music.

In 1959, Foster and a group of school friends formed a band called The Tradewinds. Their repertoire initially consisted of American guitar instrumentals, skiffle, and excerpts from The Goon Show.

The band needed a bass-player, so Foster set out to convert a cheap acoustic guitar into a bass guitar. The pick-up consisted of two ex-military headphones squeezed into a transparent plastic soap-dish, which was then connected by TV aerial cable to a socket marked "gram" at the back of his Dad's large Murphy radio. It worked, but failed to impress his friends.

In June 1959, the ban on the import of American musical instruments into the UK, which had been introduced by the British Board of Trade in 1951, was lifted and such instruments (notably Fender and Gibson guitars) became available soon after that. Foster had become a fan of the bass playing of Jet Harris of The Shadows, but had not seen the actual instrument until 1961, when Jet was revealed casually caressing the iconic headstock of a Fender Precision Bass on the cover of The Shadows LP. Foster wanted one, but had to settle for a Dallas Tuxedo Bass, the solitary bass guitar hanging in the window of the local music shop, the Band Box.

In the early 1960s, there were no college music courses available for electric instruments, so Foster followed a scientific path, electing to study physics and mathematics at the University of Sussex. But the university's pop band, The Baskervilles, and later the University of Sussex Jazz Trio (known as the US Jazz Trio), needed a drummer. So Foster set aside his bass, and for the next three years he played drums at university dances and balls, supporting major acts such as Cream, Georgie Fame and the Blue Flames, The Who, The Graham Bond Organisation, The Zombies, Jimi Hendrix, The Moody Blues, Pink Floyd, and Steampacket with Rod Stewart, Long John Baldry, Julie Driscoll and Brian Auger.

Foster's first professional success came in 1968, when the US Jazz Trio morphed into the progressive jazz/rock band, Affinity, with singer Linda Hoyle, Hammond organist Lynton Naiff, guitarist Mike Jopp, drummer Grant Serpell, and Foster, now back on bass guitar. Affinity played numerous London gigs and radio sessions, attracting the attention of jazz club impresario, Ronnie Scott, who became their manager. Scott secured a record deal with Vertigo Records who chose John Anthony, who had produced albums for Genesis, Queen and Roxy Music, to produce their one, eponymous album. Led Zeppelin's John Paul Jones wrote brass and string arrangements for the collection of self-penned tracks and cover-versions. The album was released in 1970, to a strong reception from the press and broadcasters. However, despite television appearances, and concerts across Europe, the album didn't sell well, and Linda Hoyle chose not to continue, re-appearing with a solo album in 1971. Soon after, the band dissolved, leaving Foster to seek employment as a freelance bass guitarist.

== Session years ==
After Affinity played their last gig in 1970 Foster decided that rather than being an over-educated but unemployed musician he needed to join another band. He placed a classified ad in Melody Maker magazine stating "Bass Guitarist: ex-name group, wishes to join established Family/Colosseum/Traffic type group". He expected no response, but a music producer called Christos Demetriou (i.e. Chris Demetriou) unexpectedly called and offered him a job with ex-Manfred Mann singer Mike d'Abo's band. After touring with the band both in the US and in the UK, Foster's name started to get around. In 1971 he was hired to do a studio session for a Russ Ballard song, "Can't Let You Go" at Lansdowne Studios. "I knew nothing and turned up with a flask and sandwiches because I didn't know how long I'd be there for. There was Clem Cattini on drums, Ray Cooper on percussion, Mike Moran on keyboards, Ray Fenwick on guitar, all fine players and nice guys who thought my naiveté was amusing! That was the beginning of a word of mouth situation which gradually mushroomed." The European disco scene was growing and session work was increasing and Foster was hired to play on a lot of the popular hits of the time including Jimmy Helms' "Gonna Make You an Offer You Can't Refuse" and Cerrone's hit "Supernature".

In his early days as a session player Foster, having been self-taught, could not read music and freely admitted that he bluffed his way through a lot of sessions. Finally at a session at Abbey Road Studios, playing with the Royal Philharmonic Orchestra, it got so difficult to follow the music by listening to the drummer and guitarist that he vowed to teach himself. This he then did.

As a session musician Foster played on over 350 recordings including artists as varied as:

- Phil Collins
- Jeff Beck
- Gerry Rafferty
- Ringo Starr
- Frida (of ABBA)
- Gary Moore
- Cher
- Peter Green
- Scott Walker
- Elkie Brooks
- Joan Armatrading
- Michael Schenker Group
- Olivia Newton-John
- Neil Innes
- Judie Tzuke
- Sheena Easton
- Meat Loaf
- Trevor Rabin
- Andrew Lloyd Webber & Tim Rice
- Luka Bloom
- The Royal Philharmonic Orchestra
- The London Symphony Orchestra
- Nigel Kennedy and Kroke

As a sideman Foster toured the world or played concerts with:

- Jeff Beck
- Phil Collins
- Joan Armatrading
- Gil Evans
- Mike d'Abo,
- Van Morrison
- RMS
- Eric Clapton
- Sting
- Maggie Bell
- Dusty Springfield
- The Manfreds
- George Martin
- Hank Marvin
  (who wrote the foreword of the UK version of Mo's book)
- Cliff Richard
- Véronique Sanson,
- The London Symphony Orchestra

During his time as a session player, Foster was asked to work on many film soundtrack sessions including:

Film

- For Your Eyes Only
- Octopussy
- Revenge of the Pink Panther
- Clockwise
- Heaven's Prisoners
- Lost and Found
- Billy the Kid and the Green Baize Vampire
- Silver Dream Racer

TV

- Minder
- Bergerac
- Grafters
- Stay Lucky
- Dangerfield
- The Last Salute
- Peak Practice

In 1975 Foster pioneered the teaching of bass guitar in Britain by founding the first-ever course at Goldsmiths College, University of London. As of mid-2007, along with guitarist Ray Russell and drummer Ralph Salmins, Foster embarked on several music seminars at different educational establishments around the UK, the most recent (September 2007) being held at Leeds Metropolitan University. The trio have also been invited to give a similar seminar at the famous Liverpool Institute for Performing Arts music school which was started by Sir Paul McCartney. He has also contributed several articles to bass playing specialist magazines.

One of Foster's most memorable bass lines was in the theme tune to the late-70s UK TV show "Minder" starring Dennis Waterman. The tune, "I Can Be So Good For You" started out life as a track on Waterman's solo album, it was then re-jigged as the show's theme tune. He achieved the atypical bass sound by using an unusual bass slap technique on an aluminium Kramer 650B bass guitar.

Foster cited several well known bassists as being the inspirations to both his playing and his compositions, including Carol Kaye, Jet Harris, Jack Bruce and Stanley Clarke.

== Jazz years ==
In the mid to late 80s Foster was the 'M' in the jazz/rock trio called RMS with fellow session musos, Ray Russell and Simon Phillips. They released (originally on Peter Van Hooke's then at the time fledgling MMC record label) an album called Centennial Park which was remastered and re-released in 2002 on the Angel Air record label. This in turn prompted the release of a live album from 1982 that had never been heard publicly before RMS: Live at the Venue, 1982.

As a result of the success of these two CD releases, a DVD (which featured guest appearances by Gil Evans and Mark Isham) was released a year later. RMS: Live at the Montreux Jazz Festival, 1983. Both the CDs and DVD were produced by Foster and Ray Russell.

== Solo years ==
In the mid-1980s, Foster joined up with comedy writer/actor Mike Walling to form the core of the imaginary, but tragic RJ Wagsmith Band. Together they wrote a chart topping song for Roger Kitter (aka "The Brat"). They also penned what became one of the few one-hit wonders that never actually made it into the charts. "The Papadum Song" was about two losers who go into an Indian restaurant for a meal after a football match. The song got quite considerable airplay and Walling and Foster appeared together on the BBC children's programmes Blue Peter and Granada TV's Get It Together. Unfortunately there was an industrial dispute at Phonogram Records and no records actually got to the shops.

At the latter end of the 1980s Foster decided that he would like the freedom to perform, produce and record his own music rather than that of someone else. He was able to call on some of his many friends who happened to be some of the UK's foremost session musicians to help him. Since 1987 he has released five solo albums.

=== Solo albums ===
- Bel Assis (1988) (featuring Gary Moore and drummer Simon Phillips)
- Southern Reunion (1991) (featuring Gary Moore, Gary Husband and Snail's Pace Slim)
- Time To Think (2002)
- Live at Blues West 14 (2006)
- Belsize Lane: A Collection of Sketches (2007) (Limited Issue)

== Producer years ==
Apart from his five solo albums Foster has produced – or co-produced – albums for Deborah Bonham (The Old Hyde), Dr John (Such A Night), Maggie Bell (Live at the Rainbow), Affinity (Live Instrumentals 1969, 1971–72, Origins 1965–67, and Origins Baskervilles 1965), Survivors (Survivors), Maria Muldaur (Live in London), Adrian Legg (Fretmelt), RMS (Centennial Park, Live at the Venue 1982), RMS with Gil Evans (Live at the Montreux Jazz Festival 1983 DVD), The RJ Wagsmith Band (Make Tea Not War).

In addition Foster composed and produced hundreds of titles for the major Production Music Libraries, co-wrote with Ray Russell the instrumental "So Far Away" for Gary Moore, co-wrote with Mike Walling the comedy hit single "Chalk Dust" for The Brat, co-wrote with Kim Goody the song "Sentimental Again" which reached the final in the Song for Europe Contest in 1990, and co-wrote with Ringo Starr, Joe Walsh, and Kim Goody the main song "In My Car" from Ringo's album Old Wave.

== Author years ==
In 1997 Foster authored a semi-autobiographical and anecdotal book about the birth and rise of Rock guitar in the UK during the period 1955 – 1975.

The book's title is Seventeen Watts?, the title having arisen from the school band member's quandary of "do we really need that much power?" when a 17W Watkins Dominator Amplifier was acquired as a replacement for the 'aging' 5W amp they had previously been using. The US edition of the book was entitled Play Like Elvis and had a different foreword, this time written by Duane Eddy.

The first half of the book covers the emergence of a new breed of the rock guitarist. It features many anecdotes describing the efforts of now prominent guitarists to not only learn chords but to work out how to build their own guitar because they could not afford the ones in the music shop window. There are stories and quotes from guitarists such as Jeff Beck, Ritchie Blackmore, Joe Brown, Clem Cattini, Eric Clapton, Lonnie Donegan, Vic Flick, Herbie Flowers, Roger Glover, George Harrison, Mark Knopfler, Hank Marvin, Brian May, Gary Moore, Joe Moretti, Pino Palladino, Rick Parfitt, John Paul Jones, Francis Rossi, Gerry Rafferty, Mike Rutherford, Big Jim Sullivan, Andy Summers, Richard Thompson, Bert Weedon, Bruce Welch, and Muff Winwood.

The second half of Seventeen Watts? is devoted to the rise and eventual demise of the London studio session scene. Foster seeks to present an insider's view of this creative world, and to convey a sense of the absurdist flavour of musicians' humour.

== Later years ==
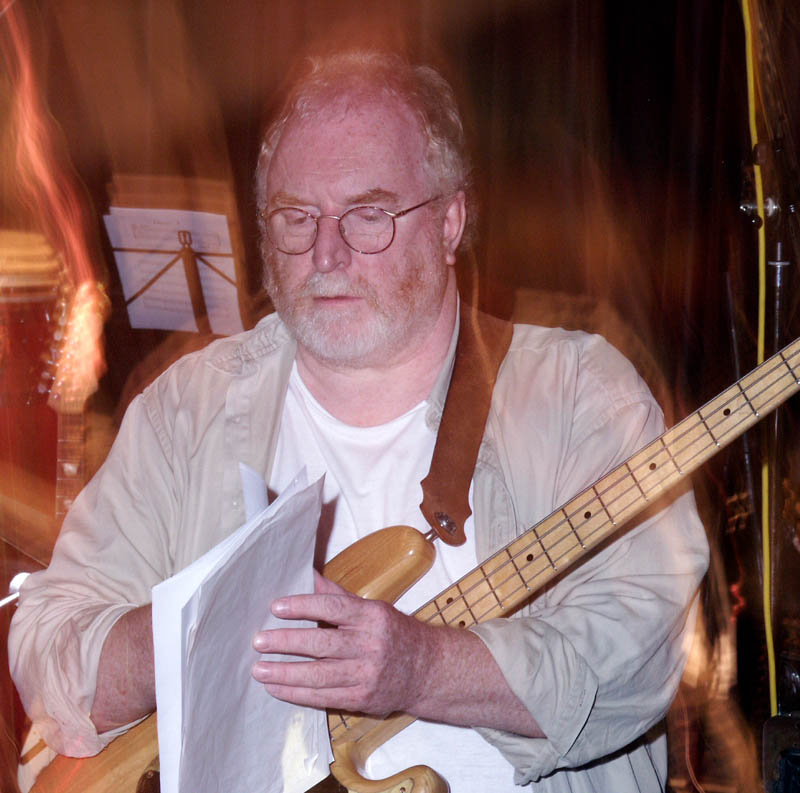
Foster in 2006

Foster worked as an archivist/interviewer on the UK Channel 4 series Live From Abbey Road, which involved interviewing musicians and bands who were performing live sets at EMI's world-famous Abbey Road Studios.

Foster later concentrated on producing albums for others, composing music, session work, playing with Brian May and Brian Bennett on a 12-hour session at Abbey Road Studios for a re-make of Cliff Richard's 1958 hit "Move It"), writing, researching and remastering his back catalogue (not only for his solo projects but also for other artists).

Foster also resumed playing concerts with his band RMS, featuring Ray Russell, and Gary Husband – notably with Gary Moore at a charity concert Vibes From The Vines.

In April 2012, Foster performed at the Jet Harris Heritage Foundation tribute lunch with The Shadowers and Daniel Martin on Nivram and Diamonds.

== Death ==
Foster died from liver and bile duct cancer on 3 July 2023, at the age of 78.

== Influences ==
The bass-players who have influenced Foster include:

- Dave Ambrose
- Ray Brown
- Jack Bruce
- Ron Carter
- Paul McCartney
- Stanley Clarke
- Andy Fraser
- Larry Graham
- Jet Harris
- Michael Henderson
- Anthony Jackson
- James Jamerson
- Jimmy Johnson
- Louis Johnson
- John Paul Jones
- Carol Kaye
- Ron Mathewson
- Marcus Miller
- Jaco Pastorius
- Leland Sklar
- Esperanza Spalding
- Steve Swallow
- Stevie Wonder
- Danny Thompson
- Miroslav Vitouš

== Selected discography ==
Foster has played on hundreds of commercially released recordings and soundtracks. The lists below represent only a small fraction of his recorded performances.

=== Albums ===
Artist	Album	Label	Year
Affinity	Affinity	Vertigo	1970
Mike d'Abo	Down at Rachel's Place	A&M	1972
Olivia Newton-John	Music Makes My Day	Pye	1973
Roger Glover and Guests	The Butterfly Ball	EMI	1974
Jimmy Helms	Gonna Make You An Offer!	Cube	1975
Fancy	Something To Remember	Arista	1975
Andrew Lloyd Webber & Tim Rice	Evita	MCA	1976
Véronique Sanson	Vancouver	WEA	1976
Mike Smith & Mike d'Abo	Smith & d'Abo	CBS	1976
Cerrone	Supernature	WEA	1977
Ray Russell	Ready Or Not	Angel Air	1977
Andy Bown	Good Advice	EMI	1978
The Walker Brothers	Nite Flights	GTO	1978
Chris Rainbow	Looking Over My Shoulder	Polydor	1978
Gerry Rafferty	Night Owl	UA	1979
Chris Rainbow	White Trails	EMI	1979
Judie Tzuke	Welcome to the Cruise	Rocket	1979
Dollar	Shooting Stars	Carrere	1979
Cliff Richard & The Shadows (live)	Thank You Very Much	EMI	1979
Jeff Beck	There And Back	Epic	1980
Peter Green	Watcha Gonna Do	PVK	1980
Michael Schenker	The Michael Schenker Group	Chrysalis	1980
Dennis Waterman	So Good For You	EMI	1980
Jeff Beck, Eric Clapton, Sting	The Secret Policeman's Concert	Island	1981
Phil Collins, Bob Geldof etc. (live)	The Secret Policeman's Other Ball	Island	1981
RMS	Centennial Park	Angel Air	1981
Trevor Rabin	Wolf	Chrysalis	1981
Phil Collins	Hello, I Must Be Going!	Virgin	1982
Frida (Annifrid Lyngstad of ABBA)	Something's Going On	Polar	1982
Sheena Easton	Madness, Money & Music	EMI	1982
Neil Innes	Off The Record	MMC	1982
Phil Collins (live)	Live at Perkins Palace	EMI	1983
Gary Moore	Victims of the Future	10	1983
Ringo Starr/Joe Walsh	Old Wave	RCA	1983
Tony Banks (Genesis)	The Fugitive	Charisma	1983
Gil Evans (live)	The British Orchestra	Mole Jazz	1983
Leo Sayer	Have You Ever Been in Love	Chrysalis	1983
Scott Walker	Climate of Hunter	Virgin	1984
Russ Ballard	Russ Ballard	EMI	1984
Heaven 17	How Men Are	Virgin	1984
Dr John	Such A Night/Live in London	Spindrift	1984
Claudio Baglioni	La Vita E'Adesso	CBS	1985
Kenny Rogers	The Heart of the Matter	RCA	1985
Elkie Brooks	No More the Fool	Legend	1986
Howard Jones	One To One	WEA	1986
Virginia Astley	Hope in a Darkened Heart	WEA	1986
Tanita Tikaram	Ancient Heart	WEA	1988
Mo Foster	Bel Assis	Angel Air	1988
George Martin	Under Milk Wood	EMI	1988
London Symphony Orchestra	Wind of Change	Columbia	1991
Nanci Griffith	Late Night Grande Hotel	MCA	1991
Toshi (of X)	Made in Heaven	Ariola	1992
Gerry Rafferty	On A Wind & A Prayer	Polydor	1992
Bill Tarmey	A Gift of Love	EMI	1993
Bill Tarmey	Time for Love	EMI	1994
Cher	It's A Man's World	WEA	1995
The Royal Philharmonic Orchestra	The Cult Files	Silva Screen	1996
Soraya	On Nights Like This	Island	1996
Luka Bloom	Salty Heaven	Sony	1998
Bill Tarmey	In My Life	EMI	2001
Maggie Bell (live)	Live at the Rainbow 1974	Angel Air	2002
Deborah Bonham	The Old Hyde	Track	2004
Cliff Richard and Brian May	Two's Company - The Duets	EMI	2006
The Shadows	The Shadows Live at the BBC	BBC	2018
Mo Foster & Friends (live)	In Concert	Right Track	2020

=== Hit singles ===
Artist	Single	Label	Year
Jimmy Helms	Gonna Make You an Offer You Can't Refuse	Cube	1973
Julie Covington	Don't Cry for Me Argentina	MCA	1976
Cerrone	Supernature	WEA	1977
Dollar	"Who Were You With in the Moonlight"	Trojan	1978
Sarah Brightman	"I Lost My Heart To Starship Trooper"	Ariola	1978
Gerry Rafferty	"Night Owl"	UA	1979
Judy Tzuke	"Stay with Me till Dawn"	Rocket	1979
Dennis Waterman	"I Could Be So Good For You"	EMI	1979
Jeff Beck	"Space Boogie"	Epic	1980
Sheena Easton	"Nine to Five (Morning Train)"	EMI	1981
Frida (ABBA)	"I Know There's Something Going On"	Polar	1982
The Brat	"Chalk Dust - The Umpire Strikes Back"	Hansa	1982
Gary Moore	"Empty Rooms"	10	1983
Ringo Starr/Joe Walsh	"In My Car"	RCA	1983
Elkie Brooks	"No More the Fool"	Legend	1986
Howard Jones	"No One Is to Blame"	WEA	1986
Toshi (of X)	"Made in Heaven"	Ariola	1992
Cliff Richard/Brian May	"Move It"	EMI	2006

== Awards ==
On 14 October 2014, Foster was presented with a BASCA Gold Badge Award in recognition of his unique contribution to music.

== Personal life ==
Mo Foster lived in London, with his wife, Kay.

== See also ==
- University of Sussex
- Abbey Road Studios
- AIR Studios
