= Ray Russell (musician) =

English guitarist

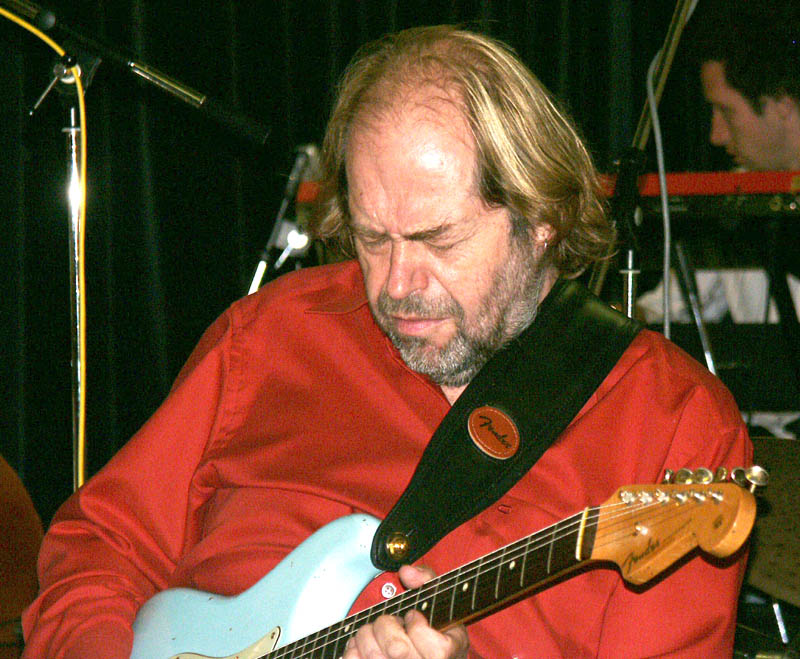
- Russell performing in 2004

Background information
- Born: Raymond Russell; 4 April 1947 (age 79); Islington, North London, England
- Genre: Jazz rock
- Occupations: Musician; composer; educator; TV producer; film producer
- Instrument: Guitar
- Years active: 1963–present
- Labels: Cuneiform; Angel Air
- Website: rayrussell.co.uk

Raymond Russell (born 4 April 1947) is an English session musician and experimental jazz rock guitarist. He is also a record producer and composer. Russell made his professional debut as Vic Flick's replacement as lead guitarist in the John Barry Seven.

== Session guitarist ==
In 1973 he was a member of the band Mouse, which released a progressive rock album entitled Lady Killer for the Sovereign record label.

== Composition in TV/film ==
In 1963, Russell assumed Vic Flick's position as lead guitarist of the John Barry Seven. He played on the soundtracks for James Bond films - Moonraker, You Only Live Twice, Octopussy, Thunderball, Live and Let Die, The Man with the Golden Gun, and The Spy Who Loved Me. Russell was later employed by George Harrison's company HandMade Films and played for the film scores of Monty Python's Life of Brian, Water and Time Bandits.

Russell's TV compositions have included A Touch of Frost, for which he won a Royal society Television Award, Bergerac, Plain Jane, A Bit of a Do, Rich Tea and Sympathy, The Inspector Alleyn Mysteries, Dangerfield and Grafters, as well as The Murder of Meredith Kercher and BBC's Hooded Men. He also played in the DVD Simon Phillips Returns with Simon Phillips and Anthony Jackson.

Russell was composer for British TV Detective series A Touch of Frost - series 6-15 between 1999-2010.6 He released an album A Touch of FrostT in 2003 which featured David Jason as Frost on the cover.

In 2008 Russell, drummer Ralph Salmins, and sound engineer Rik Walton created Made Up Music, a music library that distributes music on its web site and by sending portable hard drives to music editors.

In March 2020, Russell featured on an episode of the BBC Television programme Antiques Roadshow, in which his fretless six-string electric guitar, made by Bartell and gifted to him by George Harrison, having originally belonged to John Lennon, was valued at £300,000-£400,000.

== Discography ==
- Turn Circle (CBS, 1968)
- Dragon Hill (CBS, 1969)
- June 11, 1971: Live at the ICA (RCA Victor, 1971)
- Rites & Rituals (CBS, 1971)
- Secret Asylum (Black Lion, 1973)
- Ready or Not (DJM, 1977)
- This Side Up (B&W, 1989)
- A Table Near the Band (Angel Air, 1990)
- Guitars from Mars (Virgin, 1990)
- Why Not Now (1988)
- Childscape (1990) with Gil Evans and Mark Isham
- June 11th 1971: Live at the ICA / Retrospective (Mokai, 2000)
- A Touch of Frost (Universal, 2003)
- The Composer's Cut (Angel Air, 2005)
- Goodbye Svengali (Cuneiform, 2006)
- Myths & Legends (Strip Sounds, 2007)
- Now, More Than Ever (Abstract Logix, 2013)
- The Celestial Squid with Henry Kaiser (Cuneiform, 2015)
- Fluid Architecture (Cuneiform, 2020)
