= The Best of the Rest =

Greatest hits album by UFO
- Released: 1988
- Genre: Hard rock, heavy metal
- Length: 66:36
- Label: Chrysalis
- Compiler: Mark Snider

UFO chronology
Misdemeanor (1985)	The Best of the Rest (1988)	Ain't Misbehavin' (1988)

Professional ratings
Review scores
Source	Rating
AllMusic	2/5 stars
Collector's Guide to Heavy Metal	9/10
The Encyclopedia of Popular Music	3/5 stars

The Best of the Rest is a compilation album by the band UFO released in 1988. As the title implies, it focuses on the post-Michael Schenker years.

== Track listing ==
1. "The Writer" - 4:09 (from the album Mechanix)
2. "Mystery Train" - 3:54 (from the album No Place to Run)
3. "Makin Moves" - 4:44 (from the album The Wild, the Willing and the Innocent)
4. "Night Run" - 4:22 (from the album Misdemeanor)
5. "You and Me" - 3:18 (from the album Making Contact)
6. "Alpha Centauri" - 1:56 (from the album No Place to Run)
7. "Lettin' Go" - 4:01 (from the album No Place to Run)
8. "Something Else" - 3:19 (from the album Mechanix)
9. "Blinded by a Lie" - 4:01 (from the album Making Contact)
10. "Diesel in the Dust" - 4:21 (from the album Making Contact)
11. "Chains Chains" - 3:25 (from the album The Wild, the Willing and the Innocent)
12. "This Time" - 4:37 (from the album Misdemeanor)
13. "Back into My Life" - 4:53 (from the album Mechanix)
14. "The Way the Wind Blows" - 4:13 (from the album Making Contact)
15. "Money, Money" - 3:29 (from the album No Place to Run)
16. "Let It Rain" - 4:00 (from the album Mechanix)
17. "A Fool for Love" - 3:54 (from the album Making Contact)
