= The Best of UFO: Gold Collection =

The Best of UFO

Greatest hits album by UFO
- Released: 25 March 1996
- Genre: Hard rock, heavy metal
- Length: 69:19
- Label: EMI

UFO chronology
| Walk on Water (1995) | The Best of UFO (1996) | Werevolves of London (1998) |

Professional ratings
Review scores
| Source | Rating |
|---|---|
| AllMusic | 4/5 stars |

Best of UFO is a greatest hits collection by the British hard rock band UFO, released in 1996 as part of EMI Records' Gold Collection series.

== Track listing ==
1. "Doctor Doctor" – 4:27 (from the album Phenomenon)
2. "Only You Can Rock Me" – 4:10 (from the album Obsession)
3. "Let It Roll" – 3:56 (from the album Force It)
4. "Shoot Shoot" – 3:40 (from the album Force It)
5. "Let It Rain" – 4:00 (from the album Mechanix)
6. "When It's Time to Rock" – 5:25 (from the album Making Contact)
7. "Rock Bottom" – 6:29 (from the album Phenomenon)
8. "Love to Love" – 6:55 (from the album Lights Out)
9. "High Flyer" – 4:03 (from the album Force It)
10. "Can You Roll Her" – 2:57 (from the album No Heavy Petting)
11. "Pack It Up (And Go)" – 3:15 (from the album Obsession)
12. "Hot & Ready" – 3:17 (from the album Obsession)
13. "This Time" – 3:44 (from the album Misdemeanor)
14. "Long Gone" – 5:20 (from the album The Wild, the Willing and the Innocent)
15. "Young Blood" – 3:02 (from the album No Place to Run)
16. "Lonely Heart" – 4:12 (from the album The Wild, the Willing and the Innocent)
