= Regenerator – Live 1982 =

Live album by UFO
- Released: 6 November 2001
- Recorded: 28 January 1982
- Venues: Hammersmith Odeon, London
- Genres: Hard rock, heavy metal
- Length: 69:34
- Label: Zoom Club Records

UFO chronology
On with the Action (2000)	Regenerator – Live 1982 (2001)	Sharks (2002)

Professional ratings
Review scores
Source	Rating
AllMusic	3.5/5 stars
The Encyclopedia of Popular Music	2/5 stars

Regenerator – Live 1982 is a live album by the British hard Rock band UFO, recorded live at the Hammersmith Odeon in London on 28 January 1982. It is the official issue of the bootleg UFO Landed London of the early 1990s, with the addition of the song "Mystery Train".

== Track listing ==
1. "We Belong to the Night" (Neil Carter, Phil Mogg, Pete Way) – 4:22
2. "Let It Rain" (Carter, Mogg, Way) – 3:09
3. "Long Gone" (Paul Chapman, Mogg) – 5:02
4. "The Wild, the Willing and the Innocent" (Chapman, Mogg) – 4:51
5. "Only You Can Rock Me" (Mogg, Michael Schenker, Way) – 4:20
6. "No Place to Run" (Chapman, Mogg) – 5:02
7. "Love to Love" (Mogg, Schenker) – 8:43
8. "Doing It All for You" (Carter, Chapman, Mogg, Way) – 4:02
9. "Makin' Moves" (Chapman, Mogg) – 4:49
10. "Too Hot to Handle" (Mogg, Way) – 6:46
11. "Mystery Train" (Junior Parker, Sam Phillips) – 7:52
12. "Lights Out" (Mogg, Andy Parker, Schenker, Way) – 10:36

== Personnel ==
- Phil Mogg – vocals
- Paul Chapman – guitars
- Neil Carter – keyboards, guitar, backing vocals
- Pete Way – bass
- Andy Parker – drums
