= Riding High =

Riding High may refer to:

== Books ==
- Riding High, a 1987 book written by John Francome
- Riding High, a 1998 book by British journalist Ted Simon
- Riding High, a 1946 book by Lenora Mattingly Weber

== Film and television ==
- Riding High (1937 film), a British comedy film starring Helen Haye
- Riding High (1943 film), starring Dorothy Lamour and Dick Powell
- Riding High (1950 film), starring Bing Crosby and Coleen Gray
- Riding High (1981 film), a British film
- Riding High (Canadian TV series), a Canadian music television series
- Riding High (New Zealand TV series), a 1995 television series from New Zealand

== Music ==
=== Albums ===
- Riding High (Chilliwack album), 1974 (also the name of the fifth song in the track)
- Riding High (Faze-O album), 1977 (also the name of the first song in the track)
- Riding High - The Unreleased Third Album, a 2000 album by Lone Star
- Ridin High (8Ball & MJG album), 2007 (also the name of the third song in the track)
- Ridin' High (The Impressions album), 1966 (also the name of the first song in the track)
- Ridin' High (Margo Smith album), 1981 (also the name of the sixth song in the track)
- Ridin' High (Martha and the Vandellas album),1968
- Ridin' High (Maynard Ferguson album), 1968
- Ridin' High (Moxy album), 1977 (also the name of the fifth song in the track)
- Ridin' High (Robert Palmer album), 1992 (also the name of the fifteenth song in the track)
- Ridin' High, a 1975 album by Jerry Jeff Walker

=== Songs ===
- "Ridin' High" (song), a 1936 song by Cole Porter
- "Riding High", a 1967 song by People!
- "Riding High", a 1982 song by Rosemary Butler
- "Riding High", a 1998 song by Tracy Shaw
- "Riding High", a 1994 song from the Traffic album Far from Home
- "Riding High", a 1971 song on The Wailers album Soul Revolution Part II
- "Ridin' High" (song), a 1984 single by Moxy.
- "Riding High", a 2001 song on The Wash soundtrack

== Other ==
- Riding high, a variation of the sexual missionary position
