= Over the Hills and Far Away (Gary Moore song) =

1986 single by Gary Moore

Single by Gary Moore

from the album Wild Frontier
- B-side: "Crying in the Shadows"
- Released: 8 December 1986
- Genre: Hard rock; heavy metal; progressive metal; celtic rock
- Length: 4:38 (7" version); 5:20 (album version); 7:23 (12" version)
- Label: 10
- Songwriter: Gary Moore
- Producer: Peter Collins

Gary Moore singles chronology
"Listen to Your Heartbeat" (1985)	"Over the Hills and Far Away" (1986)	"Wild Frontier" (1987)

"Over the Hills and Far Away" is a song by Northern Irish musician Gary Moore, released in December 1986 by 10 Records as the first single from his sixth solo album Wild Frontier. The song peaked at number 20 on the UK Singles Chart, but was most successful in the Nordic countries, topping the charts in Finland and Norway.

The song features The Chieftains, who also appear in the video. Moore performed the song with the group at the TV show celebrating their 25th anniversary in 1988.

The single B-side, "Crying in the Shadows", was also written by Moore and was produced by Mike Stone. It was also recorded by Japanese singer Minako Honda, titled "The Cross (Ai No Jujika)", with Moore on guitar. Moore's version of "Crying in the Shadows" was released as a single in Japan in October 1986, one month after Honda's version, with "Once in a Lifetime" from the Run for Cover album as the B-side.

== Lyrics ==
The song is about a man wrongfully accused of armed robbery, but who will not tell who his alibi is as it is the wife of his best friend, with whom he was having an affair. So, he gets sent to prison "over the hills and far away, for ten long years". During prison he receives love letters from the woman and "he swears he will return one day", so "back in his arms is where she'll be".

The song's subject matter is very similar to that of the 1959 country ballad "Long Black Veil", which also involves a wrongfully convicted man who refuses to give an alibi because it would reveal his affair with his best friend's wife.

== Track listing ==
7" vinyl

1. "Over the Hills and Far Away" – 4:38
2. "Crying in the Shadows" – 5:00

7" vinyl double pack (limited edition, UK)

1. "Over the Hills and Far Away"
2. "Crying in the Shadows"
3. "Out in the Fields" (Live)
4. "All Messed Up" (Live)

12" vinyl

1. "Over the Hills and Far Away" (Extended Version) – 7:23
2. "Over the Hills and Far Away" (7" Version) – 4:38
3. "Crying in the Shadows" – 5:00
4. "All Messed Up" (Live at Milton Keynes) – 5:52

CD (1988, UK)

1. "Over the Hills and Far Away"
2. "Crying in the Shadows"
3. "All Messed Up" (Live)

== Charts ==
Chart (1987)	Peak position
Australia (Kent Music Report)	94
Finland (Suomen virallinen lista)	1
Ireland (IRMA)	6
Netherlands (Dutch Top 40)	25
Netherlands (Single Top 100)	22
New Zealand (Recorded Music NZ)	43
Norway (VG-lista)	1
Sweden (Sverigetopplistan)	7
Switzerland (Schweizer Hitparade)	27
UK Singles (Official Charts)	20
US Mainstream Rock (Billboard)	24

== Covers ==
- Ukrainian singer Ruslana performed the song in Ukrainian titled Понад горами (Ponad Horamy), the studio version appeared on her album Naikrashche, released in 2001.
- In 2000, it was covered by Swedish viking metal band Thyrfing on their third album Urkraft.
- In 2001, it was covered by Finnish symphonic metal band Nightwish for their EP of the same name, which peaked at number 1 in Finland as well as charting in several other countries.
- In 2004, for the Gary Moore tribute album Give Us Moore, it was covered by German heavy metal band Domain.
- In 2015, it was covered by Finnish country band Steve 'n' Seagulls on their debut album Farm Machine.
- In 2018, it was covered by Patty Gurdy on the album Shapes & Patterns EP. The music video has been viewed over 14 million times.
