= Abominog =

Studio album by Uriah Heep
- Released: April 1982
- Recorded: October and December 1981
- Studio: Roundhouse (London)
- Genres: Hard rock, pop metal
- Length: 41:48
- Label: Bronze
- Producer: Ashley Howe

Uriah Heep chronology
Conquest (1980)	Abominog (1982)	Head First (1983)

Singles from Abominog
- 1. "On the Rebound" Released: February 1982; 2. "That's the Way That It Is" Released: May 1982

Abominog is the fourteenth studio album by the English rock band Uriah Heep, released in April 1982 by Bronze Records in the UK, and on 12 July 1982 by Mercury Records in the US. It was their first album without keyboardist Ken Hensley. The album was critically acclaimed and fairly commercially successful, due in part to the band retooling and updating their sound to a polished contemporary hard rock style, "delivering a punchier, more pop-metal–oriented sound", according to AllMusic.

The album featured their final US hits, "On the Rebound" and "That's the Way That It Is". The latter was their highest-charting single of the 1980s, reaching No. 25 on the American rock airplay chart.

The album was preceded by a 7-inch EP titled Abominog Junior, featuring "On the Rebound" and two non-album tracks: the Small Faces cover "Tin Soldier", and the original song "Son of a Bitch".

== Lineup ==
When the previous line-up disintegrated, guitarist Mick Box briefly considered forming a new group entirely, but ultimately decided to continue with the Heep name. Abominog was the first of three albums to feature both vocalist Peter Goalby and keyboard player John Sinclair. It also marked the return of drummer Lee Kerslake to the band; his previous departure had been due to his unhappiness with the band's management, rather than the personnel. Coming along with Kerslake was bassist Bob Daisley; the two musicians had been in Ozzy Osbourne's Blizzard of Ozz-era band before being fired by Sharon Osbourne.

== Cover versions ==
Half of the ten tracks are cover versions of recordings by other artists:

- "Hot Night in a Cold Town" was originally recorded by John Cougar, on his Nothin' Matters and What If It Did album (1980). The song was written by songwriters Geoffrey Cushing-Murray and Richard Littlefield.
- "On the Rebound" was originally recorded by Russ Ballard, on his Russ Ballard & the Barnet Dogs album (1980).
- "Prisoner" was originally recorded by Sue Saad and the Next, on their self-titled album (1980). The lyrics were written by D.B. (Dirty Boy) Cooper.
- "Running All Night (With the Lion)" was originally recorded by Gary Farr's Lion, on their Running All Night album (1980). Lion keyboard player Sinclair brought this song with him when he joined Uriah Heep.
- "That's the Way That It Is" was originally recorded by the Bliss Band, on their Neon Smiles album (1979).

The album also included a remake of "Think It Over", a song recorded by the prior (and largely different) line-up of Uriah Heep. The original version (featuring Trevor Bolder on bass, Gregg Dechert on keyboards, Chris Slade on drums, and John Sloman on lead vocals), was the A-side of a 1980 Heep single.

== Reception ==
Professional ratings
Review scores
Source	Rating
AllMusic	4.5/5 stars
Collector's Guide to Heavy Metal	10/10
Uncut	3/5 stars

A retrospective review by AllMusic noted that "echoes of the group's old style could be heard in the drama and instrumental firepower of the new songs, but the overall sound owed a greater debt to the New Wave of British Heavy Metal and harder-rocking AOR groups of the time", and concluded by saying that the album "rocks hard enough to please heavy metal addicts but is slick enough to win over AOR fanatics and this combination makes it one Uriah Heep's most enduring achievements. Canadian journalist Martin Popoff defined Abominog an "intelligent, well-paced record" where the "reinvented" Uriah Heep retools the genres of each song over "a decisively strong foundation of melodic metal", evoking "the magic of the NWOBHM, tinged with the complex chemistry of the peak Byron years."

== Track listings ==
Side one
No.	Title	Writer(s)	Length
1.	"Too Scared to Run"	Mick Box, Bob Daisley, Peter Goalby, Lee Kerslake, John Sinclair	3:49
2.	"Chasing Shadows"	Box, Daisley, Goalby, Kerslake, Sinclair	4:39
3.	"On the Rebound"	Russ Ballard	3:14
4.	"Hot Night in a Cold Town"	Geoff Cushing-Murray, Richard Littlefield	4:03
5.	"Running All Night (with the Lion)"	Box, Daisley, Gary Farr, Goalby, Kerslake, Sinclair	4:28

Side two
No.	Title	Writer(s)	Length
6.	"That's the Way That It Is"	Paul Bliss	4:06
7.	"Prisoner"	D. B. Cooper, James Lance, Tony Riparetti	4:33
8.	"Hot Persuasion"	Box, Daisley, Goalby, Kerslake, Sinclair	3:48
9.	"Sell Your Soul"	Box, Daisley, Goalby, Kerslake, Sinclair	5:25
10.	"Think It Over"	Trevor Bolder, John Sloman	3:42

=== North American version ===
Side one
No.	Title	Length
1.	"Too Scared to Run"	3:49
2.	"On the Rebound"	3:14
3.	"Chasing Shadows"	4:39
4.	"Prisoner"	4:33
5.	"Sell Your Soul"	5:25

Side two
No.	Title	Length
6.	"That's the Way That It Is"	4:06
7.	"Think It Over"	3:42
8.	"Hot Night in a Cold Town"	4:03
9.	"Hot Persuasion"	3:48
10.	"Running All Night (with the Lion)"	4:28

1997 remastered edition bonus tracks
No.	Title	Writer(s)	Length
11.	"Tin Soldier" (Small Faces cover, from the EP Abominog Junior)	Ronnie Lane, Steve Marriott	3:49
12.	"Son of a Bitch" (from the EP Abominog Junior)	Box, Daisley, Goalby, Kerslake, Sinclair	4:08
13.	"That's the Way That It Is" (demo)		4:27
14.	"Hot Persuasion" (demo)		4:04
Total length:			58:16

2004 deluxe edition bonus tracks
No.	Title	Length
11.	"Son of a Bitch" (from the EP Abominog Junior)	4:07
12.	"Tin Soldier" (from the EP Abominog Junior)	3:54
13.	"Think It Over" (video soundtrack)	3:17
14.	"Too Scared to Run" (live)	4:19
15.	"Sell Your Soul" (live)	5:43
16.	"That's the Way That It Is" (live)	3:58
Total length:		67:06

== Personnel ==
Uriah Heep

- Mick Box – guitars, backing vocals
- Lee Kerslake – drums, backing vocals
- Bob Daisley – bass guitar, backing vocals
- John Sinclair – keyboards, backing vocals
- Peter Goalby – lead vocals

Production

- Ashley Howe – producer, engineer, mixing
- Nick Rogers – engineer
- Howie Weinberg – mastering at Masterdisk, New York

== Charts ==
Chart (1982)	Peak position
German Albums (Offizielle Top 100)	52
Norwegian Albums (VG-lista)	30
UK Albums (Official Charts)	34
US Billboard 200	56
