= Live in Stockholm =

Live in Stockholm may refer to:

- Live in Stockholm (Don Cherry album), 2013
- Live in Stockholm (Deep Purple album), a 2005 remix of the 1988 album Scandinavian Nights
- Live in Stockholm (Rickie Lee Jones album), 2011
- Live in Stockholm (EP), by John Norum, 1990

== See also ==
- Live in Stockholm 1961, an album by John Coltrane
- Live in Stockholm 1963, an album by John Coltrane
- Live in Stockholm 1977, a 1996 album by Hurriganes
- Live in Stockholm 1994, an album by the Breeders
- Live at Isstadion Stockholm: Wild Frontier Tour, a 1987 video by Gary Moore
