= John Sloman =

Welsh singer (born 1957)

- Born: John Anthony David Sloman; 26 April 1957 (age 68); Cardiff, Wales
- Genres: Hard rock; pop rock; progressive rock; heavy metal
- Occupation: Singer
- Instruments: Vocals; keyboards; guitar
- Years active: 1977–present
- Labels: Bronze Records; FM Records; EMI Records; Majestic Rock
- Formerly of: Trapper; Pulsar; Lone Star; Uriah Heep; UFO; John Sloman's Badlands; the Gary Moore Band
- Website: johnsloman.net

John Anthony David Sloman (born 26 April 1957) is a Welsh singer and musician, best known as the lead vocalist for Welsh band Lone Star during 1977/78 and classic rockers Uriah Heep from 1979 to 1981, as well as briefly recording with hard rock band UFO in 1980 and Irish guitarist Gary Moore's band.

== Biography ==
Sloman's first band of note was local Cardiff act Trapper (with Pino Palladino) before he joined Lone Star in time for their 1977 second album, Firing on All Six, supported by a Reading Festival appearance on 26 August 1977, a headline tour, and another tour with Frank Marino and Mahogany Rush later that same year. Lone Star disbanded before a third album could be completed as guitarist Paul Chapman left to take Michael Schenker's spot in UFO. Four songs from a BBC broadcast with Sloman, recorded 29 September 1977 at Queen Mary College, were released in 1994 as part of BBC Radio One Live in Concert.

Sloman and Lone Star drummer Dixie Lee, along with Trapper bassist Pino Palladino, would join forces in Canadian outfit Pulsar with keyboardist Gregg Dechert and former Ian Thomas Band guitarist Dave Cooper. It would prove to be a short lived union as Sloman got the call from Uriah Heep in 1979 to take over for John Lawton. Sloman recorded the album Conquest but departed in 1981, citing "musical differences." An uncredited Sloman also played keyboards on UFO's 1981 album The Wild, the Willing and the Innocent.

After Uriah Heep, he formed the band John Sloman's Badlands and showcased at the Marquee Club but failed to procure a record deal. Badlands featured former Trapper drummer John Munro, Whitesnake's Neil Murray on bass, Graeme Pleeth on keyboards and guitarist John Sykes prior to his joining Thin Lizzy (and later reuniting with Murray in Whitesnake). Sloman and Murray would both join Gary Moore's band which resulted in the Rockin' Every Night: Live in Japan album.

In 1984 Sloman went on to record the first of his solo albums, the Todd Rundgren produced Disappearances Can Be Deceptive, which was not released until 1989. It featured contributions from former Trapper and Pulsar bandmates Pino Palladino, John Munro, and Gregg Dechert (who had also spent time with Sloman in Uriah Heep), as well as noted session guitarist Alan Murphy.

Sloman worked on various projects throughout the 1990s, including Souls Unknown with old mates Palladino (who would later serve for a number of years as touring bassist for The Who) and Munro and The Who/Atomic Rooster affiliated guitarist Steve 'Boltz' Bolton. Another project involved Palladino, guitarist Mats Johansson, and drummer Theodore Thunder (Dick Heckstall-Smith, Leo Sayer). Sloman would take on the pseudonym Earl Grangetown for The Beat Poets, a venture into soul music, which also featured former Lone Star bandmate Pete Hurley on bass. Although an album was recorded, it was never released.

Sloman has gone on to produce nine more albums since the turn of the millennium, Dark Matter (2003) and 13 Storeys (2006), an acoustic affair on which he is credited with playing everything from cello to harmonium. Reclamation (2009), Don't Try This At Home (2011), Taff Tail Troubadour (2016), El Dorado (2018), Metamorph (2019), Two Rivers (2022) and Vaudeville (2024)

Sloman guested with NWOBHM veterans Praying Mantis on 2003's The Journey Goes On, providing lead vocals on three songs, "Tonight", "Beast Within" and "The Voice." He is also credited on the 2007 soundtrack for Highlander: The Source as the vocalist performing the Queen hits "Princes of the Universe" and "Who Wants to Live Forever" as well as "The Sun Is Gonna Shine", a duet with Tamasin Hardy.

== Discography ==
=== Solo ===
- Disappearances Can Be Deceptive... (recorded 1984/85 released 1989)
- Dark Matter (2003)
- 13 Storeys (2006)
- Reclamation (2010)
- Don't Try This at Home (2016)
- The Taff Trail Troubadour (2017)
- El Dorado (2018)
- Metamorph (2020)
- Two Rivers (2022)
- Vaudeville (2025)

Videos

- This River is a Time Machine (2021)
- The Last Coal-miner (2022)
- 70’s Sunday (2022)

Books

- Lost On Planet Artifice (2022)
- 'Kontradamus' (2024)

=== with Lone Star ===
- Firing on All Six (1977)
- BBC Radio One Live in Concert (1994)

=== with Uriah Heep ===
- Conquest (1980)

=== with UFO ===
- The Wild, the Willing and the Innocent (1981)

=== with Gary Moore ===
- Rockin' Every Night: Live in Japan (1983)

=== Sessions and guest appearances ===
- Lloyd Cole and the Commotions – Mainstream (1987)
- Brother Beyond – Trust (1989)
- Various Artists – Kaizoku (1989)
- "Fast" Eddie Clarke – It Ain't Over till It's Over (1994)
- Praying Mantis – The Journey Goes On (2003)
