= Too Late to Cry =

Too Late to Cry may refer to:

- Too Late to Cry (Widowmaker album), 1977
- Too Late to Cry (Alison Krauss album), 1987
