= Wild Frontier =

Studio album by Gary Moore
- Released: 2 March 1987
- Genre: Pop metal
- Length: 37:20
- Label: 10/Virgin
- Producers: Peter Collins, Pete Smith, James "Jimbo" Barton, Gary Moore

Gary Moore chronology
Run for Cover (1985)	Wild Frontier (1987)	After the War (1989)

Singles from Wild Frontier
- 1. "Over the Hills and Far Away" Released: 8 December 1986; 2. "Wild Frontier" Released: 16 February 1987; 3. "Friday on My Mind" Released: 27 April 1987; 4. "The Loner" Released: 17 August 1987; 5. "Take a Little Time" Released: 23 November 1987

Professional ratings
Review scores
Source	Rating
AllMusic	2/5 stars
Collector's Guide to Heavy Metal	4/10

Wild Frontier is the sixth solo studio album by Northern Irish guitarist Gary Moore, released on 2 March 1987. His first studio effort after a 1985 trip back to his native Belfast, Northern Ireland, the album contains several songs about Ireland. The album is dedicated to the memory of Moore's close friend and former Thin Lizzy bandmate Phil Lynott, who died on 4 January 1986, with the words "For Philip" on the rear cover.

Wild Frontier contains the hit single "Over the Hills and Far Away", which reached No. 20 in the UK, as well as a cover of the Easybeats' song "Friday on My Mind". The Max Middleton-penned "The Loner" was originally recorded by Cozy Powell for his Over the Top album in 1979 (on which Moore performed, albeit not on Powell's recording of "The Loner"). The track was substantially altered by Moore for his own recording, thus he is credited as a co-writer. The song "Crying in the Shadows", which was released as the B-side of the "Over the Hills and Far Away" single in December 1986 and appears as a bonus track on the CD version of Wild Frontier, was also recorded by Japanese singer Minako Honda, titled "The Cross (Ai No Jujika)", with Moore on guitar.

Gary Moore was joined by The Chieftains on select tracks from this album.

All drums on Wild Frontier are sequenced with a drum machine, which AllMusic described as Moore's "most fatal" decision, leading to a "disappointing" album.

== Covers ==
"Over the Hills and Far Away" has been covered by the Finnish symphonic power metal band Nightwish on their 2001 EP of the same title, by Swedish viking metal band Thyrfing on their album Urkraft, and by Patty Gurdy on her Shapes & Patterns EP (2018). The Rockoutstandout reviewer wrote, "Patty Gurdy’s cover with a hurdy gurdy and vocals gives us a completely different take on the song altogether and it works very well. The echo effect on the vocals give this track that well known powerful atmosphere that the original song is able to do. I love this quirky cover and I always feel a sense of warmth when hearing the song." The Spanish band Saurom also recorded a cover of this song with alternative lyrics, titled "La Disolución de la Comunidad".

Christy Moore recorded a version of Johnny Boy on his 2021 album, Flying Into Mystery and released it as a single in November 2021. He performed the song live on the Late Late Show, noting his long time admiration for Gary Moore as a musician, and performed it following his receipt of the Lifetime Achievement Award at the RTÉ Radio 1 Folk Awards 2021.

== Track listing ==
Side one
No.	Title	Writer(s)	Length
1.	"Over the Hills and Far Away"	Gary Moore	5:20
2.	"Wild Frontier"	Moore	4:14
3.	"Take a Little Time"	Moore	4:05
4.	"The Loner" (instrumental, originally recorded by Cozy Powell)	Max Middleton, Moore	5:54

Side two
No.	Title	Writer(s)	Length
5.	"Friday on My Mind" (The Easybeats cover)	George Young, Harry Vanda	4:11
6.	"Strangers in the Darkness"	Moore, Neil Carter	4:38
7.	"Thunder Rising"	Moore, Carter	5:43
8.	"Johnny Boy"	Moore	3:15

CD release
No.	Title	Writer(s)	Length
1.	"Over the Hills and Far Away"	Moore	5:20
2.	"Wild Frontier"	Moore	4:14
3.	"Take a Little Time"	Moore	4:05
4.	"The Loner"	Middleton, Moore	5:54
5.	"Friday on My Mind"	Young, Vanda	4:11
6.	"Strangers in the Darkness"	Moore, Carter	4:38
7.	"Thunder Rising"	Moore, Carter	5:43
8.	"Johnny Boy"	Moore	3:15
9.	"Over the Hills and Far Away" (12” version)	Moore	7:26
10.	"Wild Frontier" (12” version)	Moore	6:38
11.	"Crying in the Shadows"	Moore	5:01

2002 remastered CD bonus tracks
No.	Title	Writer(s)	Length
12.	"The Loner" (Extended mix)	Middleton, Moore	7:16
13.	"Friday on My Mind" (12” version)	Young, Vanda	6:15
14.	"Out in the Fields" (live)	Moore	5:28

Note: The 12" version of "Wild Frontier" was track 5 on the 1987 CD release. There was also a double LP edition including some of the CD bonus tracks.

== Personnel ==
- Gary Moore – lead, rhythm and acoustic guitars, lead and backing vocals, producer on tracks 5, 7, and 8
- Neil Carter – keyboards, backing vocals
- Bob Daisley – bass
- Roland Kerridge – drum programming
- Paddy Moloney – pipes on tracks 1, 7 and 8
- Sean Keane & Martin Fay – fiddle on tracks 1 and 8

Production

- Peter Collins – producer on tracks 1, 2, 4, 9, 10 and 12
- Pete Smith – producer on tracks 3 and 6
- James "Jimbo" Barton – producer on tracks 5, 7, 8 and 13, engineer on tracks 1 and 2, mixing on tracks 3 and 6
- Chris Porter – engineer on tracks 2 and 4
- Mike Stone – producer on track 11
- Nigel Walker – producer on track 14
- James Barton – mixing on tracks 3 and 6
- Bob Kraushaar – mixing on track 10

== Charts ==
=== Album ===
Chart (1987)	Peak position
Austrian Albums (Ö3 Austria)	16
Canada (RPM Top 100)	95
Dutch Albums (Album Top 100)	13
Finnish Albums Chart	1
German Albums (Offizielle Top 100)	9
New Zealand Albums (RMNZ)	11
Norwegian Albums (VG-lista)	1
Spanish Albums Chart	2
Swedish Albums (Sverigetopplistan)	2
Swiss Albums (Schweizer Hitparade)	7
UK Albums (Official Charts)	8
US Billboard 200	139

=== Singles ===
Year	Single	Chart	Position
1986	"Over the Hills and Far Away"	Irish Singles Chart	6
1986	"Over the Hills and Far Away"	UK Singles Chart	20
1987	"Over the Hills and Far Away"	Finnish Singles Chart	1
1987	"Over the Hills and Far Away"	Norwegian Singles Chart	1
1987	"Over the Hills and Far Away"	Swedish Singles Chart	7
1987	"Over the Hills and Far Away"	Dutch MegaCharts	22
1987	"Over the Hills and Far Away"	Mainstream Rock Tracks (US)	24
1987	"Over the Hills and Far Away"	Swiss Singles Top 100	27
1987	"Over the Hills and Far Away"	New Zealand Singles Chart	43
1987	"Wild Frontier"	Finnish Singles Chart	4
1987	"Wild Frontier"	Irish Singles Chart	22
1987	"Wild Frontier"	UK Singles Chart	35
1987	"Friday on My Mind"	Finnish Singles Chart	15
1987	"Friday on My Mind"	Irish Singles Chart	18
1987	"Friday on My Mind"	UK Singles Chart	26
1987	"Friday on My Mind"	New Zealand Singles Chart	30
1987	"Friday on My Mind"	Dutch MegaCharts	72
1987	"The Loner"	UK Singles Chart	53
1987	"Take a Little Time"	UK Singles Chart	75

== Certifications ==
Sales certifications for Wild Frontier
Region	Certification	Certified units/sales
Finland (Musiikkituottajat)	Gold	42,791
Norway (IFPI Norway)	Gold	50,000
Sweden (GLF)	Platinum	100,000^{^}
United Kingdom (BPI)	Silver	60,000^{^}
^{^} Shipments figures based on certification alone.
