= No Place to Run =

No Place to Run may refer to:

- No Place to Run (album), a 1980 album by UFO
- No Place to Run (film), a 1972 American made-for-television drama film
