= Live at Isstadion Stockholm: Wild Frontier Tour =

Video by Gary Moore
- Released: 1987
- Recorded: 25 April 1987
- Venue: Johanneshovs isstadion, Stockholm, Sweden
- Genre: Hard Rock, Heavy metal
- Length: 70:00
- Label: Virgin
- Director: Phil Tuckett
- Producer: Steve Barnett, NFL Films

Professional ratings
Review scores
Source	Rating
AllMusic	2/5 stars

Live at Isstadion Stockholm: Wild Frontier Tour is a 1987 live video by hard rock guitarist Gary Moore, recorded live on 25 April 1987 at Johanneshovs isstadion, Stockholm, Sweden, during the tour in support of the album Wild Frontier. The sound track was recorded and mixed by Nigel Walker. The tour had the valuable contribution of drummer Eric Singer, who recently had left Black Sabbath.

== Tracks ==
1. "Over the Hills and Far Away" (Gary Moore)
2. "Thunder Rising" (Moore, Neil Carter)
3. "Wild Frontier" (Moore)
4. "Military Man" (Phil Lynott)
5. "Empty Rooms" (Moore, Carter)
6. "All Messed Up" (Moore, Carter)
7. "Out in the Fields" (Moore)
8. "Rockin' Every Night" (Moore, Paice)
9. "The Loner" (Max Middleton, Moore)

== Personnel ==
- Gary Moore – lead guitar, lead vocals
- Neil Carter – keyboards, rhythm guitar, backing and lead vocals
- Bob Daisley – bass
- Eric Singer – drums
