= Firing on All Six =

Studio album by Lone Star
- Released: August 1977
- Recorded: 25 June 1977
- Studio: Utopia Studios, London
- Genre: Hard rock, progressive rock, symphonic rock
- Length: 37:39
- Label: Epic (UK)
- Producer: Gary Lyons

Lone Star chronology
Lone Star (1976)	Firing on All Six (1977)	BBC Radio One Live in Concert (1994)

Singles from Firing on All Six
- 1. "Hypnotic Mover" Released: 5 Aug 1977; 2. "Seasons In Your Eyes" Released: 7 Oct 1977

Professional ratings
Review scores
Source	Rating
AllMusic	3.5/5 stars
Collector's Guide to Heavy Metal	7/10

Firing on All Six is the second studio album by Welsh hard rock band Lone Star. The album was released in August 1977. The album was produced by Gary Lyons, who was one of two engineers on their debut album Lone Star. The album entered the UK Albums Charts on 17 September 1977 reaching number 36. It stayed in the charts for 6 weeks. Between their debut album and Firing on All Six, the lead vocalist, Kenny Driscoll, had been replaced by John Sloman.

Steve Woods, manager of Lone Star at the time said:

“We all went down there (Ridge Farm Studio), and the idea was to write a new record, but the band just started smoking masses of dope in bong pipes, and got into these extended jams. It turned into Pink Floyd or funk jams. It was really weird. There was an upstairs area in the barn they were rehearsing in. Pete Hurley had an extended lead attached to his bass so he could he could play up there while lying down, he was so stoned. It was an unbelievable situation. There were women, drugs… nobody was doing any work. They lost sight of their goals. One day the record company came down, unannounced, at three in the afternoon to check how their investment was doing. Everybody was asleep. And they were horrified by the new songs when they heard them.”

Eventually the album was recorded at Utopia Studios in London.

== Track listing ==
Side one
No.	Title	Writer(s)	Length
1.	"The Bells of Berlin"	Paul Chapman, Dixie Lee, Rick Worsnop, Tony Smith, Peter Hurley, Kenny Driscoll	6:56
2.	"The Ballad of Crafty Jack"	Chapman, Lee, Worsnop, Smith, Hurley, John Sloman	3:40
3.	"Time Lays Down"	Chapman, Lee, Worsnop, Smith, Hurley, Sloman	4:49
4.	"Hypnotic Mover"	Chapman, Lee, Worsnop, Smith, Hurley, Driscoll	4:28

Side two
No.	Title	Writer(s)	Length
5.	"Lovely Lubina"	Chapman, Lee, Worsnop, Smith, Hurley, Sloman	3:36
6.	"Seasons in Your Eyes"	Chapman, Lee, Worsnop, Smith, Hurley, Sloman	4:13
7.	"Rivers Overflowing"	Chapman, Lee, Worsnop, Smith, Hurley, Sloman	4:57
8.	"All of Us to All of You"	Chapman, Lee, Worsnop, Smith, Hurley, Sloman	5:00

Bonus CD tracks from RockCandy Music reissue 24 October 2011)
No.	Title	Writer(s)	Length
9.	"The Bells of Berlin"	Chapman, Lee, Worsnop, Smith, Hurley, Driscoll	8:51
10.	"All of Us to All of You"	Chapman, Lee, Worsnop, Smith, Hurley, Sloman	6:42
11.	"Lonely Soldier"	Smith, Driscoll	6:15

== Personnel ==
Lone Star

- John Sloman – lead vocals
- Tony Smith – guitars, backing vocals
- Paul Chapman – guitars
- Rick Worsnop – keyboards, backing vocals
- Peter Hurley – bass
- Dixie Lee – drums, backing vocals, percussion

Technical

- Gary Lyons – record producer, engineer
- Jeff Wayne – musical arranger
- Curt Evans – album cover design

== See also ==
- Lone Star discography
