= Valdr Galga =

Valdr Galga may refer to:

- Valdr Galga (Ruler of the Gallows), a name for Odin
- Valdr Galga, a 1999 album by Thyrfing, a Viking metal band from Sweden
