= Lone Star (album) =

Studio album by Lone Star
- Released: August 1976
- Recorded: 1976
- Studio: Sweet Silence, Copenhagen
- Genre: Hard rock, progressive rock, heavy metal
- Length: 37:32
- Label: Epic (UK)
- Producer: Roy Thomas Baker

Lone Star chronology
Lone Star (1976)	Firing on All Six (1977)

Singles from Lone Star
- 1. "She Said She Said" Released: 5 Nov 1976

Professional ratings
Review scores
Source	Rating
AllMusic	3.5/5 stars
Collector's Guide to Heavy Metal	6/10

Lone Star is the debut studio album by Welsh hard rock band Lone Star. The album was released in August 1976. The album was produced by Roy Thomas Baker, who is best known for his work with Queen and The Cars. The album was later re-issue on CD in 1992 & 1996 by CBS Records/Sony. The album only spent 1 week in the UK Albums Charts reaching number 47. The album was produced at Sweet Silence Studios, Copenhagen, Denmark and mastered at Sterling Sound Studios, New York, United States.

== Track listing ==
All tracks are written by Kenny Driscoll, Tony Smith, except where indicated.

Side one
No.	Title	Writer(s)	Length
1.	"She Said She Said"	John Lennon, Paul McCartney	8:29
2.	"Lonely Soldier"		5:09
3.	"Flying in the Reel"		4:54

Side two
No.	Title	Length
4.	"Spaceships"	6:44
5.	"A New Day"	5:14
6.	"A Million Stars"	3:50
7.	"Illusions"	3:12

Bonus CD tracks from previously unreleased BBC sessions
No.	Title	Writer(s)	Length
8.	"Flying in the Reel"		—
9.	"A Million Stars"		—
10.	"She Said She Said"	Lennon, McCartney	—
11.	"Hypnotic Mover"	Pete Hurley, Dixie Lee, Rick Worsnop, Driscoll, Smith	—
12.	"Spaceships"		—

== Personnel ==
Lone Star

- Kenny Driscoll – lead vocals
- Tony Smith – guitars, backing vocals
- Paul Chapman – guitars
- Rick Worsnop – keyboards, backing vocals
- Peter Hurley – bass
- Dixie Lee – drums, backing vocals, percussion

Technical

- Roy Thomas Baker – record producer
- Freddy Hansson, Gary Lyons – engineers
- George Marino – cutting engineer
- Rosław Szaybo – album cover design

== See also ==
- Lone Star discography
