= Lone Star discography =

- Studio albums: 3
- EPs: 1
- Live albums: 3
- Compilation albums: 1
- Singles: 3

The discography of Lone Star, a Welsh hard rock band, consists of three studio albums, three live albums, one compilation album, one promotional extended play and three singles. The band split up in 1978. In 2000, a third Lone Star album was released Riding High — The Unreleased Third Album by Paul Chapman on Zoom Club. It was released without the participation of the other former band members and consisted of demos recorded by Chapman, plus previously unreleased Lone Star material, prior to their splitting up.

== Albums ==
=== Studio albums ===
Title	Album details	Peak UK chart position	Notes
Lone Star	Released 1976; Epic Records; Catalogue No:S EPC 81545	47	
Firing on All Six	Released 1977; Epic Records; Catalogue No:S EPC 82213	36	
Riding High - The Unreleased Third Album	Released 2000; Zoom Club; Catalogue No:ZRCD25	—	
"—" denotes album that did not chart

=== Live albums ===
Title	Album details	Notes
Pop Spectacular	BBC Transcription Services; Released November 1976; Catalogue No: CN 2660/S	Only available to overseas radio stations for broadcast purposes; Side A: Lone Star. Side B: Mott; Recorded live at the Paris Theatre, London, 23 September 1976 (Lone Star) and 16 October 1976 (Mott)
In Concert-160	BBC Transcription Services; Released 28 November 1977; Catalogue No: CN 2939/S	Only available to overseas radio stations for broadcast purposes; Side A: Pat Travers Band. Side B: Lone Star; Recorded live at the Queen Mary College on 29 September 1977
BBC Radio One Live in Concert	Windsong International Records; Released 1994; Catalogue No WINCD059	

=== Compilation albums ===
Title	Album details
Lone Star/Firing on All Six	BGO Records; Released 31 May 2004; Catalogue No BGOCD618

== Extended plays ==
Year	Title	Details
1976	"Hey Baby" / "Turn It Up"	Epic Records; b/w "A New Day" / "A Million Stars".; Promo-only record with Ted Nugent on the A side; Lone Star on the B side.; Released only in the Netherlands.

== Singles ==
Year	Title	B Side	Details	Album
1976	"She Said She Said"	"Illusions"	CBS Records; Released 5 Nov 1976; Catalogue No S CBS 4751	Lone Star
1977	"Hypnotic Mover"	"All of Us to All of You"	CBS Records; Released 5 Aug 1977; Catalogue No S CBS 5520	Firing on All Six
1977	"Seasons in Your Eyes"	"Lovely Lubina"	CBS Records; Released 7 Oct 1977; Catalogue No S CBS 5707	Firing on All Six
