= Widowmaker (British band) =

British band

Background information
- Origin: England
- Genres: Hard rock; blues-rock
- Years active: 1975–1977
- Labels: United Artists; Jet; Castle
- Past members: Ariel Bender; Bob Daisley; Huw Lloyd-Langton; Steve Ellis; Paul Nicholls; John Butler

Widowmaker were a British hard rock band and active from 1975 to 1977. They were considered by many to be a supergroup and released two albums. Although their influences appeared to offer vast creative possibilities, musical and personality differences led to their break-up. The legacy of Widowmaker is captured on the compilation Straight Faced Fighters (2002) released by Castle; it includes tracks from both of their albums.

== History ==
The band was formed by former Mott the Hoople and Spooky Tooth guitarist Luther Grosvenor, also known as Ariel Bender. The original line-up featured vocalist Steve Ellis from Love Affair, guitarist Huw Lloyd-Langton from Hawkwind, Australian bassist Bob Daisley of Chicken Shack, and drummer Paul Nicholls who had played with Lindisfarne.

A few months after they began rehearsing at Emerson, Lake & Palmer's Manticore Studios in London, Don Arden, the owner of Jet Records signed them. A single release "On the Road" followed in February 1976 and their debut album Widowmaker was released in the same year. The line-up for Widowmaker was augmented in the studio by vocalist and guitarist Bobby Tench from Streetwalkers and Hammond player Zoot Money. Widowmaker reached No. 196 in US and featured an eclectic mix of blues, country, folk, and hard rock.

Widowmaker toured the U.K. with Nazareth and in June 1976 they took part in a short series of all-day stadium concerts in London and Swansea entitled Who Put The Boot In alongside the leading rock bands Little Feat, The Sensational Alex Harvey Band, Outlaws, Streetwalkers, and the headline act, The Who.

Ellis left the band after a tour of North America with Electric Light Orchestra and was replaced by vocalist John Butler and the band recorded their second album Too Late to Cry. Daisley joined Rainbow and Widowmaker broke up after the release of Too Late to Cry (February 1977).

== Discography ==
- Widowmaker, Jet 2310 432 (1976)
- Too Late to Cry, (1977)
- Straight Faced Fighters, (2002) (compilation, includes previously unreleased radio sessions)

=== Singles ===
Taken from the album Widowmaker

- "On the Road"/"Pin a Rose on Me", Jet JET 766 (1976)
- "When I Met You"/"Pin a Rose on Me", Jet JET 767 (1976)
- "Pin a Rose on Me"/"On the Road", Jet JET 782 (1976) – UK No. 53 (Note: Chart position is from the official UK "Breakers List".)
