= Picato Musician Strings =

Picato Musicians Strings has been owned by Strings And Things Limited since the early 1980s when it acquired the business of General Music Strings Limited, the original founders. General Music Strings Limited was established in the 1940s by the Stein family and by the 1970s were prolific British producers of strings for acoustic, classical, electric and bass guitars; as well as banjo, mandolin, ukulele and violin. It was during this period that Tony Iommi lost the tips of two of his fingers in an accident and the Picato company designed an extra low gauge string set (.008" - .032") especially for him. At that time Picato strings were used by many famous rock guitarists and bassists such as Ritchie Blackmore, Roger Glover, Tony McPhee and Eric Clapton to name just four.

== Official users ==
- Steve Cradock & Ocean Colour Scene
- Bob Daisley
- The Vamps
- Nazareth
- The Dogs D'Amour
- Mark Yates (Terrorvision)
- Alan Thomson

== Links ==
- Official website
