= Widowmaker (album) =

Studio album by Widowmaker
- Released: 24 February 1976
- Recorded: August–September 1975
- Studio: De Lane Lea (Wembley)
- Genre: Rock
- Labels: Jet (UK); United Artists (US)
- Producer: Widowmaker

Widowmaker chronology
Widowmaker (1976)	Too Late to Cry (1977)

Professional ratings
Review scores
Source	Rating
AllMusic	3/5 stars

Widowmaker is the debut album by the English hard rock band Widowmaker, which was released in February 1976. Widowmaker reached #196 in US and featured an eclectic mix of blues, country, folk and hard rock.

== Track listing ==
1. "Such a Shame" (Daisley)
2. "Pin a Rose on Me" (Ellis, Grosvenor, Nichols)
3. "On the Road" (Ellis, Grosvenor, Nichols)
4. "Straight Faced Fighter" (Ellis)
5. "Ain't Telling You Nothing" (Bender, Ellis)
6. "When I Met You" (Grosvenor)
7. "Leave the Kids Alone" (Ellis)
8. "Shine a Light on Me" (Grosvenor, Wright)
9. "Running Free" (John Farnham)
10. "Got a Dream" (Daisley)

== Personnel ==
- Steve Ellis – vocals
- Ariel Bender – guitar
- Huw Lloyd-Langton – guitar
- Bob Daisley – bass
- Paul Nicholls – drums

Additional personnel

- Bobby Tench – vocals
- Zoot Money – keyboards

=== Singles ===
Taken from the album

- "On the Road" / "Pin a Rose on Me" (1976, Jet JET 766)
- "When I Met You" / "Pin a Rose on Me" (1976, Jet JET 767)
- "Pin a Rose on Me" / "On the Road" (1976, Jet JET 782)
