= Head First (Uriah Heep album) =

Studio album by Uriah Heep
- Released: May 1983
- Recorded: January–March 1983
- Studio: The Manor (Shipton-on-Cherwell); Roundhouse (London)
- Genre: Heavy metal; AOR
- Length: 37:21
- Label: Bronze
- Producer: Ashley Howe

Uriah Heep chronology
Abominog (1982)	Head First (1983)	Equator (1985)

Singles from Head First
- 1. "Lonely Nights" Released: June 1983; 2. "Stay on Top" Released: August 1983

Professional ratings
Review scores
Source	Rating
AllMusic	2.5/5 stars
Collector's Guide to Heavy Metal	8/10
Uncut	2/5 stars

Head First is the fifteenth studio album by English rock band Uriah Heep. It was released in May 1983 by Bronze Records in the UK and Mercury Records in the US. It is Uriah Heep's last album released by Bronze Records.

The album was recorded by the line-up responsible for the previous year's Abominog, but this time with a greater proportion of the songs written by the band members. Bob Daisley left the group shortly after the album's recording to rejoin Ozzy Osbourne; on the Head First tour former Heep bassist Trevor Bolder rejoined the band, effectively replacing his replacement, and remained with the band until his death in 2013.

Though Head First was deemed to be a worthy successor to Abominog by critics such as Geoff Barton, it suffered from a lack of promotion as Bronze went into liquidation the month after its release.

Video footage of the tour, from a show in New Zealand, was heavily featured on the long-form video Easy Livin': A History of Uriah Heep. In Japan only, this was also released on laserdisc.

== Track listings ==
Side one
No.	Title	Writer(s)	Length
1.	"The Other Side of Midnight"	Mick Box, Bob Daisley, Peter Goalby, Lee Kerslake, John Sinclair	3:55
2.	"Stay on Top"	Tom Jackson	3:35
3.	"Lonely Nights" (Bryan Adams cover)	Bryan Adams, Jim Vallance	4:07
4.	"Sweet Talk"	Box, Daisley, Goalby, Kerslake, J. Sinclair, Linda Sinclair	3:51
5.	"Love is Blind"	Joey Carbone, Richie Zito	3:38

Side two
No.	Title	Writer(s)	Length
6.	"Roll-Overture"	Box, Daisley, Goalby, J. Sinclair	2:18
7.	"Red Lights"	Box, Daisley, Goalby, J. Sinclair	2:57
8.	"Rollin' the Rock"	Box, Daisley, Goalby, J. Sinclair	5:31
9.	"Straight Through the Heart"	Box, Daisley, Goalby, Kerslake, J. Sinclair	3:39
10.	"Weekend Warriors"	Box, Daisley, Goalby, Kerslake, J. Sinclair	3:50

1997 remastered edition bonus tracks
No.	Title	Writer(s)	Length
11.	"Playing for Time" (B-side of the single "Stay on Top")	Box, Daisley, Goalby, Kerslake, J. Sinclair	4:27
12.	"Searching" (instrumental out-take)	Box, Daisley, Goalby, Kerslake, J. Sinclair	3:52
13.	"The Wizard" (live 1984)	Mark Clarke, Ken Hensley	4:52
Total length:			50:32

2005 deluxe edition bonus tracks
No.	Title	Writer(s)	Length
11.	"Playing for Time" (B-side of the single "Stay on Top")		4:27
12.	"Searching" (extended demo)		4:54
13.	"The Other Side of Midnight" (live 1984)		4:36
14.	"Lonely Nights" (live 1984)		6:45
15.	"Angel" (live 1985)	Trevor Bolder, Box, Goalby, Kerslake, J. Sinclair	5:22
Total length:			63:25

== Personnel ==
Uriah Heep

- Mick Box – guitar, backing vocals
- Lee Kerslake – drums, backing vocals
- Bob Daisley – bass guitar, backing vocals
- John Sinclair – keyboards, synthesizer, backing vocals
- Peter Goalby – lead vocals
- Trevor Bolder – bass guitar and backing vocals on live tracks

Additional musician

- Frank Ricotti – percussion on "Roll-Overture"

Production

- Ashley Howe – producer, engineer, mixing
- Nick Rogers – engineer, mixing on "Roll-Overture"
- Keith Nixon – assistant engineer

== Singles ==
- "Stay on Top" was released as a single and a video was made. A double-7" gatefold edition was released. Non-album track "Playing for Time" was included.
- "Lonely Nights", a cover version of the previous year's hit by Bryan Adams, was the second single. A picture-disc 7" was released.

== Charts ==
Chart (1983)	Peak position
German Albums (Offizielle Top 100)	56
Norwegian Albums (VG-lista)	19
UK Albums (OCC)	46
US Billboard 200	159
