= We Want Moore! =

Live album by Gary Moore
- Released: 1 October 1984
- Recorded: February and June 1984
- Venue: Harpos Concert Theatre (Detroit); Nippon Budokan (Tokyo); The Apollo (Glasgow); Hammersmith Odeon (London); Ulster Hall (Belfast)
- Genre: Hard rock, heavy metal
- Length: 66:02
- Label: 10/Virgin
- Producer: Gary Moore and Tony Platt

Gary Moore chronology
Victims of the Future (1984)	We Want Moore! (1984)	Run for Cover (1985)

Professional ratings
Review scores
Source	Rating
AllMusic	4/5 stars
Rock Hard	9.0/10

We Want Moore! is a live album by Northern Irish guitarist Gary Moore, released on 1 October 1984.

== Track listing ==
Side one
No.	Title	Writer(s)	Recorded at	Length
1.	"Murder in the Skies" (from Victims of the Future, 1984)	Moore, Neil Carter	Harpos Concert Theatre, Detroit, Michigan, 23 June 1984	5:32
2.	"Shapes of Things" (from Victims of the Future, 1984)	Paul Samwell-Smith, Keith Relf, Jim McCarty	Harpos Concert Theatre, Detroit, Michigan, 23 June 1984	8:16
3.	"Victims of the Future" (from Victims of the Future, 1984)	Moore, Carter, Ian Paice, Neil Murray	Harpos Concert Theatre, Detroit, Michigan, 23 June 1984	8:28

Side two
No.	Title	Writer(s)	Recorded at	Length
4.	"Cold Hearted" (includes intro solo to "End of the World"; from Corridors of Power, 1982)	Moore	Tokyo Budokan, Japan, 29 February 1984	10:37
5.	"End of the World" (from Corridors of Power, 1982)	Moore	The Apollo, Glasgow, Scotland, 14 February 1984	4:33
6.	"Back on the Streets" (from Back on the Streets, 1979)	Moore	The Apollo, Glasgow, Scotland, 14 February 1984	5:27

Side three
No.	Title	Writer(s)	Recorded at	Length
1.	"So Far Away"	Mo Foster, Ray Russell	The Apollo, Glasgow, Scotland, 14 February 1984	2:41
2.	"Empty Rooms" (from Victims of the Future, 1984)	Moore, Carter	The Apollo, Glasgow, Scotland, 14 February 1984	8:28

Side four
No.	Title	Writer(s)	Recorded at	Length
3.	"Don't Take Me for a Loser" (from Corridors of Power, 1982)	Moore	Harpos Concert Theatre, Detroit, Michigan, 23 June 1984	5:49
4.	"Rockin' and Rollin'" (from G-Force, 1980)	Moore, Mark Nauseef	Hammersmith Odeon, 11 February 1984	6:38

2002 remastered CD bonus track
No.	Title	Writer(s)	Recorded at	Length
11.	"Parisienne Walkways" (from Back on the Streets, 1978)	Moore, Phil Lynott	Ulster Hall, Belfast, Northern Ireland, 17 December 1984	7:04

== Personnel ==
- Gary Moore – lead vocals, lead guitar, producer, backing vocals on 2
- Neil Carter – keyboards, rhythm guitar, backing vocals, lead vocals on 2, harmony vocals on 9
- Craig Gruber – bass, backing vocals
- Phil Lynott – bass and lead vocals on track 11
- Ian Paice – drums and percussion on tracks 4–8, 10
- Bobby Chouinard – drums on tracks 1–3, 9
- Paul Thompson - drums on track 11
- Jimmy Nail – backing vocals on track 10

Production

- Tony Platt – producer, mixing at Battery Studios, London, July and August 1984
- John Hallett – mixing assistant
- Aaron Chakraverty – mastering

== Charts ==
Chart (1984)	Peak position
Finnish Albums Chart	21
German Albums Chart	52
Swedish Albums Chart	21
UK Albums Chart	32
