= Bob Daisley =

Australian bassist (born 1950)

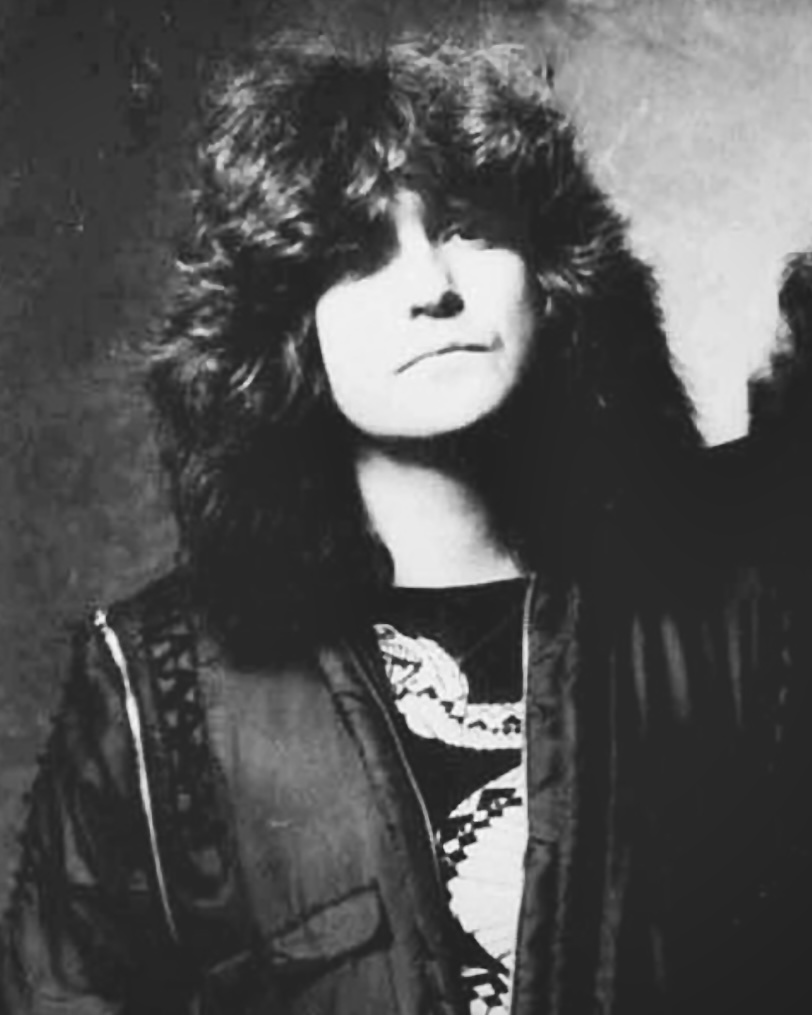
- Daisley in 1980

Background information
- Born: Robert John Daisley; 13 February 1950 (age 76); Sydney, New South Wales, Australia
- Genres: Hard rock; blues rock; heavy metal; progressive rock; jazz fusion
- Occupations: Musician; songwriter; lyricist
- Instrument: Bass guitar
- Years active: 1964–present
- Formerly of: Ozzy Osbourne, Black Sabbath, Rainbow, Uriah Heep, Gary Moore, Chicken Shack, Mungo Jerry, Widowmaker, Mother's Army
- Website: bobdaisley.com

Robert John Daisley (born 13 February 1950) is an Australian musician and songwriter. As a bassist, he is best known for his intermittent relationship with vocalist Ozzy Osbourne, for whom he contributed bass guitar, co-production and songwriting throughout the 1980s. Daisley has also worked with prominent rock acts including Black Sabbath, Rainbow, Gary Moore, Chicken Shack and Uriah Heep, among others. In 2013, he published his autobiography entitled For Facts Sake.

== Biography ==
=== Early career ===
Daisley began playing guitar at age 13 and went on to bass at 14. His rapid progress won him local acclaim, especially through his work with guitarist Dennis Wilson with The Powerpact and Mecca; Mecca's only single release "Black Sally" became an underground hit and was covered by Human Instinct on their Stoned Guitar album. Daisley and Wilson then formed Kahvas Jute with Tamam Shud members Tim Gaze and Dannie Davidson. They released one album, Wide Open, on Infinity Records in 1971.

Daisley came to international notice as a bass player and member of the English blues band Chicken Shack in 1972, before going on to play with Mungo Jerry in 1973 and on their 1974 album Long-Legged Woman Dressed in Black. After this he co-formed Widowmaker, contributing to two albums – 1975's self-titled debut and Too Late to Cry in 1977. The same year he joined Ritchie Blackmore's band Rainbow and later played on tracks of the Long Live Rock 'n' Roll album. He remained with Rainbow until 1979 when he was replaced by Blackmore's ex-Deep Purple bandmate Roger Glover.

=== Ozzy Osbourne ===
In October 1979, Daisley met Ozzy Osbourne at a venue called the Music Machine in Camden Town, after Osbourne had been fired from the band Black Sabbath. The pair hit it off and Osbourne suggested they form a band. They were soon joined by former Quiet Riot guitarist Randy Rhoads, whom Osbourne had recently met in Los Angeles. The trio hired ex-Uriah Heep drummer Lee Kerslake and settled on the band name The Blizzard of Ozz, though the new band's management soon decided to bill the act simply as "Ozzy Osbourne".

Daisley contributed bass, songwriting and co-production on the group's first album, Blizzard of Ozz, and co-wrote all of the material on the follow-up album Diary of a Madman but both he and drummer Lee Kerslake were fired before the second album was released. Bassist Rudy Sarzo received credit on Diary of a Madman, though he did not perform on it. While he had written songs with Widowmaker, Daisley would not do it with Rainbow given "Richie and Ronnie were self-sufficient in that area", only to take a more hands-on approach for Osbourne as he disapproved of the lyrics the singer and Rhoads had attempted.

Daisley and Kerslake later successfully sued Don Arden and Jet Records for performance royalties and to have their performance credits added to Diary of a Madman. Litigation continued for many years until Daisley and Kerslake sued the Osbournes (who unknown to Daisley and Kerslake had purchased the early albums' publishing rights) for unpaid performance royalties and accreditation. Sharon Osbourne, without Ozzy's knowledge, responded by re-issuing new CD versions of both albums with the bass and drum tracks re-recorded by Robert Trujillo and Mike Bordin in 2002. In 2003, Daisley and Kerslake's lawsuit was dismissed by the United States District Court in Los Angeles. This dismissal was upheld by the United States Court of Appeals for the Ninth Circuit. In 2011, Sony Legacy re-released both albums with Daisley and Kerslake's original bass and drum parts restored.

Daisley continued to return to the Osbourne camp to write and record for several albums throughout the 1980s, playing on and/or writing for Bark at the Moon (1983), The Ultimate Sin (1986), and No Rest for the Wicked (1988). He maintained his working relationship with the Osbournes up until 1991's No More Tears album, which featured his bass playing on all tracks. Mike Inez (who later joined Alice in Chains) appeared in the album's promotional videos.

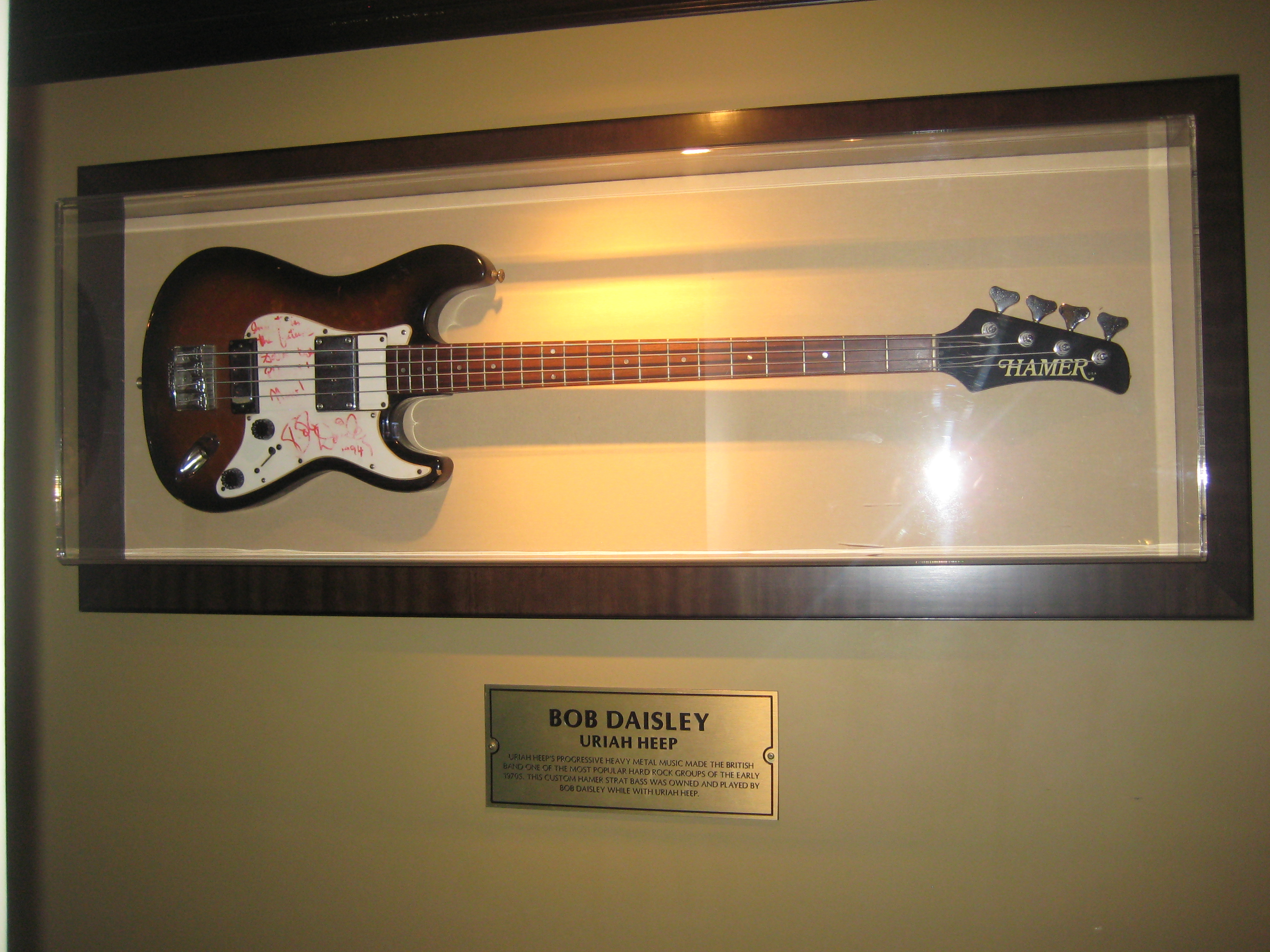
Bob Daisley's Hamer bass in Hard Rock Cafe Prague, 2011

=== Uriah Heep ===
After leaving Osbourne's band the first time, Daisley joined the reformed Uriah Heep in 1981 alongside Kerslake and remained with them until the following year, recording two albums, Abominog and Head First, both of which helped to rekindle some interest in the band.

=== Gary Moore ===
During his on-off involvement with Osbourne, Daisley also recorded many albums with Gary Moore and toured extensively with him.

=== Black Sabbath ===
In 1986, he was approached by producer Jeff Glixman to play on the Black Sabbath album The Eternal Idol, as the band's actual bass player Dave Spitz had personal commitments to attend to. However, Spitz was credited on the final release along with him. Daisley was offered the bassist's spot in Black Sabbath but turned it down due to his commitment to Gary Moore, with whom he continued to work from time to time until the guitarist's death in 2011.

=== Other contributions ===
Since the 1980s, Daisley has contributed to a wealth of recordings as bassist, lyricist and producer, including albums by Yngwie Malmsteen, Takara, Bill Ward, Black Sabbath and Jeff Watson of Night Ranger. Daisley and Watson teamed up again and formed Mother's Army with vocalist Joe Lynn Turner and drummer Carmine Appice. In 2003, following his second and unsuccessful suit against Ozzy Osbourne, he teamed up with Lee Kerslake, Steve Morse of Deep Purple and Australian rock singer Jimmy Barnes to record an album under the name Living Loud. Six of the album's eleven tracks were covers from Blizzard of Ozz and Diary of a Madman. Don Airey played keyboards on the Living Loud album. On 7 February 2003 Daisley recorded a live show at The Basement in Sydney with Australian blues band The Hoochie Coochie Men, for a live DVD and CD release. Featured were former Deep Purple organist Jon Lord and Jimmy Barnes. In 2007, The Hoochie Coochie Men released the studio album Danger: White Men Dancing, also featuring Jon Lord. In September 2014, Daisley was hired to produce the debut album of Adelaide-based hard rock band Cherry Grind.

=== Book ===
Daisley's autobiography For Facts Sake was published in August 2013.

== Gear ==
Daisley uses Mark Bass heads, and Picato Strings since 1972. He recorded Ozzy Osbourne's solo debut Blizzard of Ozz with a white Gibson EB-3 from 1961, through one of Randy Rhoads' Marshall stacks, and continues to use an early-1960s EB-3 to this day. However, the follow-up to Blizzard, Diary of a Madman, (and most of the other albums he recorded on) was recorded with a Fender Precision Bass. No More Tears was recorded with a P-bass as well, but an early '50s model with a single coil pickup (in sunburst).

== Discography ==
Year	Band	Album	Notes
1970	Kahvas Jute	Wide Open	
2006	Kahvas Jute	Then Again (Live at the Basement)	
1973	Chicken Shack	Unlucky Boy	
1973	Mungo Jerry	"Alright, Alright, Alright" (single)	
1974	Mungo Jerry	Long Legged Woman Dressed in Black	
1976	Widowmaker	Widowmaker	
1977	Widowmaker	Too Late to Cry	
2002	Widowmaker	Straight Faced Fighter	Compilation
1978	Rainbow	Long Live Rock 'n' Roll	
1986	Rainbow	Finyl Vinyl	Compilation
2006	Rainbow	Live in Munich 1977	CD & DVD
1980	Ozzy Osbourne	Blizzard of Ozz	
1981	Ozzy Osbourne	Diary of a Madman	Not credited on original release
1982	Uriah Heep	Abominog	UK No. 34, US No. 56
1983	Uriah Heep	Head First	UK No. 56, US No. 159
1983	Ozzy Osbourne	Bark at the Moon	
1983	Gary Moore	Victims of the Future	
1985	Gary Moore	Run for Cover	
1986	Ozzy Osbourne	The Ultimate Sin	Daisley co-wrote most of the songs, but did not play on the album
1987	Ozzy Osbourne	Tribute	Two songs only, taken from a different show
1987	Gary Moore	Wild Frontier	
1987	Black Sabbath	The Eternal Idol	
1988	Ozzy Osbourne	No Rest for the Wicked	
1988	Yngwie Malmsteen	Odyssey	UK No. 10
1989	Gary Moore	After the War	
1990	Gary Moore	Still Got the Blues	
1991	Ozzy Osbourne	No More Tears	
1992	Gary Moore	After Hours	
1993	Mother's Army	Mother's Army	
1996	Uriah Heep	Time of Revelation	
1997	Mother's Army	Planet Earth	
1998	Mother's Army	Fire on the Moon	
2001	The Hoochie Coochie Men	The Hoochie Coochie Men	
2003	The Hoochie Coochie Men with Jon Lord	Live at the Basement	2CD & DVD
2003	Living Loud	Living Loud	
2004	Gary Moore	Power of the Blues	
2005	Living Loud	Live in Sydney 2004	
2007	The Hoochie Coochie Men with Jon Lord	Danger. Whitemen Dancing	
2018	Bob Daisley And Friends	Moore Blues For Gary (A Tribute To Gary Moore)	
2021	The Upstarts	The Upstarts	

=== Session and guest appearances ===
- The Tyla Gang – Tyla Gang (1991)
- Bill Ward – Ward One: Along the Way (1990)
- Jeff Watson – Lone Ranger (1992)
- Jeff Watson – Around The Sun (1993)
- Takara – Taste of Heaven (1995)
- Various artists – In From the Storm, a Jimi Hendrix tribute album (1995)
- Carmine Appice – Guitar Zeus (1995)
- Vertex – Vertex (1996)
- Warren DeMartini – Crazy Enough To Sing To You (1997)
- Takara – Eternity: Best of 93 – 98 (1998)
- Takara – Blind in Paradise (1998)
- Stream – Nothing Is Sacred (1998)
- Various Artists – Humanary Stew: Alice Cooper Tribute (1999)
- Various Artists – Forever Mod: A Tribute to Rod Stewart (1999)
- Silver – Intruder (2003)
- Karl Cochran – Voodooland (2004)
- The Legendary Zarsoff Brothers – Mixed Business (2005)
- Planet Alliance – Self Titled (2006)
- Jorge Salán – Chronicles of an Evolution (2007)
- Thomas Tomsen – Sunflickers (2010)
- Last Temptation – Last Temptation (2019)
- Michael Schenker Group - Universal (2022)
- King Kobra - We Are Warriors (2023)
- Cactus - Friends and Influences (2023)

=== Video – VHS edition ===
- Gary Moore – Emerald Aisles (1985)
- Gary Moore – Live at Issstadion Stockholm: Wild Frontier Tour (1987)
- Gary Moore – The Video Singles (1987)
- Guitar Gods – Ritchie Blackmore (2008, interviewee)
