= Victims of the Future =

Studio album by Gary Moore
- Released: 30 January 1984
- Recorded: October–November 1983
- Studio: Townhouse (London)
- Genre: Hard rock, heavy metal
- Length: 40:55
- Label: 10/Virgin
- Producer: Jeff Glixman

Gary Moore chronology
Live (1983)	Victims of the Future (1984)	We Want Moore! (1984)

Singles from Victims of the Future
- 1. "Hold On to Love" Released: 9 January 1984; 2. "Shapes of Things" Released: 19 March 1984; 3. "Empty Rooms" Released: 30 July 1984

Alternative cover
- Original North American cover

Professional ratings
Review scores
Source	Rating
AllMusic	4.5/5 stars
Collector's Guide to Heavy Metal	6/10
Record Mirror	4/5 stars

Victims of the Future is the fourth solo studio album by Northern Irish guitarist Gary Moore, released on 30 January 1984. It was the first album to feature former UFO guitarist/keyboardist Neil Carter and bassist Bob Daisley. It was also the last to feature bassist Neil Murray, who rejoined Whitesnake, and drummer Ian Paice, who rejoined the reformed Deep Purple in 1984.

== Background ==
Continuing Moore's path in the hard rock genre, Victims of the Future is a collection of straight-out rock n' roll anthems (such as "Teenage Idol" and "Hold On to Love"), a mournful love ballad ("Empty Rooms", which was later re-recorded by Moore for his 1985 album Run for Cover), a cover of the Yardbirds' "Shapes of Things", and two darker songs, featuring social and political commentary: "Victims of the Future" and "Murder in the Skies", the latter a protest against the Soviet Union's shooting down of Korean Air Lines Flight 007.

The album was released in North America with a different cover and altered content. The guitar solo intro to "Murder in the Skies" was removed, and "Devil in Her Heart", a single B-side, was added. "All I Want", omitted from the LP, was included as a bonus track on the cassette version.

Moore later dismissed Victims of the Future as "just one of my feeble attempts at heavy rock".

== Track listing ==
=== UK release ===
Side one
No.	Title	Writer(s)	Length
1.	"Victims of the Future"	Moore, Neil Carter, Ian Paice, Neil Murray	6:11
2.	"Teenage Idol"	Moore	4:05
3.	"Shapes of Things" (The Yardbirds cover)	Paul Samwell-Smith, Keith Relf, Jim McCarty	4:10
4.	"Empty Rooms"	Moore, Neil Carter	6:31

Side two
No.	Title	Writer(s)	Length
5.	"Murder in the Skies"	Moore, Carter	5:15
6.	"All I Want"	Moore	4:07
7.	"Hold On to Love"	Moore	4:23
8.	"Law of the Jungle"	Moore	6:13

=== US release ===
Side one
No.	Title	Writer(s)	Length
1.	"Victims of the Future"	Moore, Carter, Paice, Murray	6:13
2.	"Teenage Idol"	Moore	4:07
3.	"Devil in Her Heart"	Moore	3:29
4.	"Empty Rooms"	Moore	6:36
5.	"All I Want" (Cassette only)	Moore	4:17

Side two
No.	Title	Writer(s)	Length
6.	"Shapes of Things"	Samwell-Smith, Relf, McCarty	4:14
7.	"Murder in the Skies"	Moore	5:49
8.	"Hold On to Love"	Moore	4:27
9.	"Law of the Jungle"	Moore	6:15

=== CD release ===
No.	Title	Writer(s)	Length
1.	"Victims of the Future"	Moore, Carter, Paice, Murray	6:13
2.	"Teenage Idol"	Moore	4:07
3.	"Shapes of Things"	Samwell-Smith, Relf, McCarty	4:14
4.	"Empty Rooms"	Moore	6:36
5.	"Murder in the Skies"	Moore, Carter	7:17
6.	"All I Want"	Moore	4:17
7.	"Hold On to Love"	Moore	4:27
8.	"Law of the Jungle"	Moore	6:15

2002 remastered CD edition bonus tracks
No.	Title	Writer(s)	Length
9.	"Devil in Her Heart"	Moore	3:29
10.	"Blinder" (instrumental)	Craig Gruber	2:46
11.	"Empty Rooms" (1984 remix)	Moore, Carter	4:21

== Personnel ==
- Gary Moore – guitar, vocals
- Neil Carter – keyboards on tracks 1, 4, 7, 8, backing vocals on tracks 1, 4, 7
- Neil Murray – bass guitar on tracks 1, 3, 7, 8
- Mo Foster – bass guitar on tracks 4 and 6
- Bob Daisley – bass guitar on tracks 2 and 5
- Ian Paice – drums on tracks 1, 3, 4, 8
- Bobby "Prime Time" Chouinard – drums on tracks 2, 5, 6, 7
- Noddy Holder – additional backing vocals on "Shapes of Things"

Production

- Jeff Glixman – producer, engineer
- Steve Trevell – assistant engineer
- Nigel Mills – basic tracks recording engineer
- Dave Meegen – basic tracks recording assistant engineer
- Ian Cooper – mastering
- Martyn Atkins - artwork
- Part Rock management - management

== Charts ==
=== Album ===
Chart (1984)	Peak position
Dutch MegaCharts	45
Finnish Albums Chart	7
German Albums Chart	53
Swedish Albums Chart	15
UK Albums Chart	12
US Billboard 200	172

=== Singles ===
Year	Single	Chart	Position
1984	"Hold On to love"	UK Singles Chart	65
1984	"Shapes of Things"	UK Singles Chart	77
1984	"Empty Rooms"	UK Singles Chart	51
