= Conquest (Uriah Heep album) =

Studio album by Uriah Heep
- Released: March 1980
- Recorded: 1979
- Studio: Roundhouse (London)
- Genres: Hard rock; AOR
- Length: 42:58
- Label: Bronze
- Producers: Uriah Heep, John Gallen, Gerry Bron

Uriah Heep chronology
Fallen Angel (1978)	Conquest (1980)	Abominog (1982)

Singles from Conquest
- 1. "Carry On" Released: 25 January 1980; 2. "Feelings" Released: March 1980 (Ger.); 3. "Love Stealer" Released: 20 June 1980; 4. "Think It Over" Released: 16 January 1981

Professional ratings
Review scores
Source	Rating
AllMusic	3.5/5 stars
Collector's Guide to Heavy Metal	1/10
Record Mirror	5/5 stars
Uncut	1/5 stars

Conquest is the thirteenth studio album by English rock band Uriah Heep, released in 1980. It was released worldwide by Bronze Records; however, the album was never released in North America, where it was difficult to find even as an import.

1979–80 was a period of change for Heep, with John Sloman taking over lead vocal duties, drummer Lee Kerslake quitting, and main songwriter Ken Hensley ultimately leaving the band. Taken together with the commercial rock sound of the album, this is the most contentious era of Uriah Heep's history, with many fans believing Conquest is the group's worst record. Despite this era being regarded in hindsight as something of a disaster by Hensley as well as Mick Box, the album did receive some positive reviews at the time, namely a five-star rating from Record Mirror and three-and-a-half stars from Geoff Barton in Sounds. It also sold well enough to crack the Top 40 of the UK album charts, whereas all three of the band's previous records with John Lawton had failed to chart in the UK at all.

The original UK release came in a single, matte LP sleeve, stickered with 'Special 10th Anniversary Price £3.99', with the liner being heavy-stock card, complete with lyrics. It credits Trevor Bolder with vocals on "It Ain't Easy" but it is, in fact, Sloman. The cover photograph, taken by Martin Poole, is based on the famous image of the raising of the second flag at Iwo Jima.

"Think It Over" was released as a picture sleeve single to promote the new line-up and tour of late 1980 and features Gregg Dechert on keyboards. Originally "Been Hurt" was written for a fourth John Lawton-fronted album. This song was shelved after Lawton's departure. The original version with Lawton on vocals has been released on the remastered version of the Fallen Angel album. When Conquest was re-issued again as a Deluxe Edition in 2004 the bonus tracks remained much the same, but "My Joanna Needs Tuning" was dropped; added in its stead was a version of "Feelings" that had previously only ever appeared on a Bronze Records promotional VHS tape.

== Track listings ==
Side one
No.	Title	Writer(s)	Length
1.	"No Return"	Trevor Bolder, Mick Box, Ken Hensley	6:07
2.	"Imagination"	Hensley	5:49
3.	"Feelings"	Hensley	5:26
4.	"Fools"	Bolder	5:03

Side two
No.	Title	Writer(s)	Length
5.	"Carry On"	Hensley	3:57
6.	"Won't Have to Wait Too Long"	Bolder, Box, Hensley	4:54
7.	"Out on the Street"	Hensley	5:57
8.	"It Ain't Easy"	Bolder	5:45

1997 remastered edition bonus tracks
No.	Title	Writer(s)	Length
9.	"Been Hurt" (B-side to "Carry On")	Hensley	3:56
10.	"Love Stealer" (single A-side)	Philip Wainman, Richard Myhill	3:28
11.	"Think It Over" (single A-side)	John Sloman, Bolder	3:33
12.	"My Joanna Needs Tuning (Inside Out)" (B-side to "Think It Over")	Bolder, Box, Gregg Dechert, Slade, Sloman	3:02
13.	"Lying" (previously unreleased outtake)	Bolder, Hensley, Slade, Sloman	4:23
Total length:			61:20

2004 expanded deluxe edition bonus tracks
No.	Title	Writer(s)	Length
9.	"Love Stealer" (single A-side)	Philip Wainman, Richard Myhill	3:28
10.	"Been Hurt" (B-side to "Carry On")	Hensley	3:56
11.	"Think It Over" (single A-side)	John Sloman, Bolder	3:33
12.	"Lying" (previously unreleased outtake)	Bolder, Hensley, Slade, Sloman	4:23
13.	"Feelings" (single edit)	Hensley	2:40
Total length:			60:58

== Personnel ==
Uriah Heep

- Mick Box – guitars, backing vocals
- Ken Hensley – OB-X, vocoder, organ, piano, guitars, backing vocals
- Trevor Bolder – bass guitar, backing vocals
- John Sloman – lead vocals, piano, percussion, guitar on "Think It Over"
- Chris Slade – drums, percussion
- Gregg Dechert – keyboards and backing vocals on "Think It Over" and "My Joanna Needs Tuning (Inside Out)"

Additional musician

- Gerry Bron – timpani on "Out on the Streets"

Production

- John Gallen – producer, engineer
- Julian Cooper, Darren Burn, David Kemp, Nick Rogers – assistant engineers
- Martin Poole – sleeve design, photography
- Karl Bosley, Lindy Curry – sleeve design
- Gerry Bron – executive producer

== Charts ==
Chart (1980)	Peak position
German Albums (Offizielle Top 100)	33
Norwegian Albums (VG-lista)	11
UK Albums (Official Charts)	37
