= Vansinnesvisor =

Studio album by Thyrfing
- Released: 2002
- Genre: Viking metal
- Length: 42:57
- Label: Karmageddon Media

Thyrfing chronology
Urkraft (2000)	Vansinnesvisor (2002)	Farsotstider (2005)

Professional ratings
Review scores
Source	Rating
Allmusic	4/5 stars

Vansinnesvisor is the name of the fourth album by the Viking metal band Thyrfing. It was released in 2002. The lyrics to track number six, "The Giant's Laughter", are a translation of the poem "Jätten" written by the Swedish poet Esaias Tegnér.

== Track listing ==
1. "Draugs Harg (Draugr's Altar)" - 4:01
2. "Digerdöden (The Black Death)" - 4:48
3. "Världsspegeln (The Mirror of the World)" - 4:52
4. "The Voyager" - 5:12
5. "Ångestens Högborg (The Stronghold of Anxiety)" - 7:03
6. "The Giant's Laughter" - 5:19
7. "Vansinnesvisan (The Song of Madness)" - 4:43
8. "Kaos Återkomst (The Return of Chaos)" - 6:59
