= Hels vite =

Studio album by Thyrfing
- Released: 22 October 2008
- Genre: Viking metal
- Length: 52:03
- Label: Regain Records
- Producer: Jörgen Svensson

Thyrfing chronology
| Farsotstider (2005) | Hels vite (2008) | De Ödeslösa (2013) |

Professional ratings
Review scores
| Source | Rating |
|---|---|
| About.com | link |
| AllMusic | link |

Hels vite is the sixth studio album by Swedish viking metal band Thyrfing. It is the first album with new singer Jens Rydén, founding member of Naglfar.

== Track listing ==
1. "En Sista Litania" – 07:10
2. "Från Stormens Öga" – 08:07
3. "Isolation" – 05:54
4. "Hels Vite" – 08:28
5. "Griftefrid" – 05:23
6. "Becoming the Eye" – 07:54
7. "Tre Vintrar – Två Solar" – 09:07
