= Killer Bee (band) =

Swedish-Canadian rock band

Background information
- Origin: Sweden, Canada
- Genres: Rock, heavy metal
- Years active: 1990–1997; 2011–present
- Labels: UFO Records; Z-Records; TARGET Records; Mighty Music; KBMHB
- Members: Brian Frank; Anders Rönnblom; Shawn Duncan; André Hägglund
- Past members: Christoffer Sjöström; Jimmy DeLisi; Eric Tarvids; Paul Chapman; Jeremy Thornton; Mats Byström; Denny DeMarchi; Johan Abbing; Magnus Grundström; Morgan Evans

Killer Bee is a Swedish–Canadian rock band formed in the 1990s by songwriters Anders "LA" Rönnblom and Brian "Bee" Frank. Former Europe guitarist Kee Marcello produced and played on the band's third album, World Order Revolution (1997). Since 1990, Killer Bee has toured Sweden, Norway, Austria, Switzerland, and Germany and performed on some of the biggest festival stages in Europe.

From Hell and Back is their comeback studio album, released in 2012. Brent "The Doctor" Doerner, former Helix guitarist, was a guest guitarist on the record, playing on two songs: "On and On" and "Step into My World". Doerner's video production company, Red D Film and Editing, directed the filming and edited the music videos for two songs from the album: "Step into My World" and "All Night Long". In December 2012, From Hell and Back album won the best Hard Rock/Metal Rock Album of 2012 poll, conducted by music magazine Myglobalmind.

== Band members ==
=== Current ===
- Brian "Bee" Frank – lead vocals
- Anders "LA" Rönnblom – bass guitar, backing vocals
- Shawn Duncan – drums, percussion
- André Hägglund – guitar, backing vocals

== Past ==
- Christoffer Sjöström – guitar, backing vocals
- Jimmy DeLisi – guitar, backing vocals
- Eric Tarvids – guitar, backing vocals
- Paul Chapman – guitar, backing vocals
- Jeremy Thornton – keyboards, guitar, backing vocals
- Mats Byström – keyboards, guitar, backing vocals
- Denny DeMarchi – keyboards, guitar, backing vocals
- Johan Abbing – drums, percussion
- Magnus Grundström – drums, percussion
- Morgan Evans – drums, percussion

== Discography ==
=== Albums ===
- Raw (1993)
- Cracked Up (1995)
- World Order Revolution (1997)
- Almost There (2011)
- From Hell and Back (2012)
- Evolutionary Children (2013)
- Rock Another Day (2015)
- Killing You Softly (2016)
- Eye in the Sky (2016)
- Remember the Times (2019)

=== Singles ===
- "Piece of My Heart" (1994)
- "Take Me Home" (1994)
- "You Think You're Hot" (1994)
- "Hey Hey" (1995)
- "All I Need" (1995)
- "Joystick Warrior" (2016)
- "Higher and Higher" (2016)
- "I'd Love to Change the World" (2016)
- "I Believe" (2016)
- "Get on Board" (2016)
