= Urkraft =

Studio album by Thyrfing
- Released: August 2000
- Recorded: 6–18 March 2000
- Genre: Viking metal
- Length: 60:08
- Label: Hammerheart Records
- Producer: Tommy Tägtgren & Thyrfing

Thyrfing chronology
Valdr Galga (1999)	Urkraft (2000)	Vansinnesvisor (2002)

Urkraft (English: Primordial Force) is the third album by Swedish viking metal band Thyrfing. It was released in 2000.

On some editions of the album, there is a bonus cover of "Over the Hills and Far Away" by rock musician Gary Moore.

== Track listing ==
1. "Mjölner" – 5:30
2. "Dryckeskväde" (translation: "Drinking Poem") – 3:54
3. "Sweoland Conqueror" – 6:30
4. "Home Again" – 7:45
5. "The Breaking of Serenity" – 4:28
6. "Eldfärd" (translation: "Journey in Fire") – 1:39
7. "Ways of a Parasite" – 4:39
8. "Jord" (translation: "Earth") – 5:17
9. "The Slumber of Yesteryears" – 3:48
10. "Till Valfader Urgammal" (translation: "To Ancient Valfader") – 4:00
11. "Urkraft" (translation: "Primordial Force") – 7:37
12. "Over the Hills and Far Away" (Gary Moore cover) – 5:01
