= The Wild, the Willing and the Innocent =

Studio album by UFO
- Released: 16 January 1981
- Recorded: 1980
- Studios: AIR, Wessex Sound and Utopia, London
- Genres: Hard rock, heavy metal
- Length: 36:45
- Label: Chrysalis
- Producer: UFO

UFO chronology
No Place to Run (1980)	The Wild, the Willing and the Innocent (1981)	Mechanix (1982)

Singles from The Wild, the Willing and the Innocent
- 1. "Couldn't Get It Right" Released: 17 October 1980; 2. "Lonely Heart" Released: 2 January 1981

Alternative cover

Professional ratings
Review scores
Source	Rating
AllMusic	3/5 stars
Collector's Guide to Heavy Metal	10/10
The Encyclopedia of Popular Music	2/5 stars

The Wild, the Willing and the Innocent is the ninth studio album by English hard rock band UFO, released on 16 January 1981. It is their first to be entirely self-produced, and its song "Lonely Heart" was a minor UK hit.

Former Wild Horses' keyboard player Neil Carter replaced Paul Raymond, who had left to join the Michael Schenker Group after a disagreement with singer Phil Mogg. However, according to guitarist Paul Chapman, Carter – though credited on the sleeve – did not play keyboards on the album (see below).

"We produced it ourselves with nobody breathing over our shoulders. The only problem was it cost twice as much because we kept changing studios and rerecording stuff…. [After Paul Raymond's departure] I tried to get John Sloman involved because he could sing, play keyboards and guitar, and was just out of Lone Star like me. He did play on the Wild album, but most of the keyboards are by the brother of the engineer Gary Edwards – until Phil sacked him. We finished that album without a keyboard player, then got Neil Carter in later." – Paul Chapman

The original cover was, as usual, designed by the art studio Hipgnosis.

The album was remastered at Sound Recording Technology in Cambridge in 1994 and reissued on Repertoire Records. The album was also reissued in 2009, remastered and with an expanded booklet and bonus tracks.

== Track listing ==
Side one
No.	Title	Writer(s)	Length
1.	"Chains Chains"	Phil Mogg, Pete Way	3:24
2.	"Long Gone"	Paul Chapman, Mogg	5:17
3.	"The Wild, the Willing and the Innocent"	Chapman, Mogg	4:57
4.	"It's Killing Me"	Mogg, Way	4:29

Side two
No.	Title	Writer(s)	Length
5.	"Makin' Moves"	Chapman, Mogg	4:43
6.	"Lonely Heart"	Chapman, Mogg, Way	5:00
7.	"Couldn't Get It Right"	Chapman, Mogg, Way	4:33
8.	"Profession of Violence" (Listed as "Profession Of" on original Canadian and US releases)	Chapman, Mogg	4:22
Total length:			40:43

Japanese CD edition bonus track:
No.	Title	Writer(s)	Length
9.	"Hot 'n' Ready" (live)	Mogg, Michael Schenker	3:34

2008 Remastered Edition CD bonus tracks:
No.	Title	Length
9.	"Long Gone" (live at Hammersmith Odeon, London 29/01/81)	5:29
10.	"Lonely Heart" (live at Hammersmith Odeon, London 29/01/81)	5:35
11.	"Makin' Moves" (live at Hammersmith Odeon, London 29/01/81)	5:42

- On the original US vinyl release, the tracks (on both sides) were numbered 1, 2, 3, 5.

== Singles ==
1. "Couldn't Get It Right"/"Hot 'n' Ready" (recorded live at the Reading Festival 1980) (Chrysalis CHS 2454)
2. "Lonely Heart"/"Long Gone" (Chrysalis CHS 2482) #41 UK

== Credits ==
UFO

- Phil Mogg – vocals
- Pete Way – bass
- Andy Parker – drums
- Paul Chapman – guitars
- Neil Carter – keyboards (credited but did not perform), guitar, backing vocals, saxophone on "Lonely Heart"

Additional musicians

- John Sloman – keyboards (uncredited)
- Paul Buckmaster – orchestral arrangements, orchestra conductor

Production

- Steve Churchyard, Gary Edwards, Jeremy Green – engineers

== Charts ==
Chart (1981)	Peak position
Swedish Albums (Sverigetopplistan)	27
UK Albums (Official Charts)	19
US Billboard 200	77
