= Lone Star (band) =

Welsh rock band (1975–1978)

- Lone Star in 1977. From left to right: John Sloman, Tony Smith, Pete Hurley, Dixie Lee, Rick Worsnop, Paul "Tonka" Chapman.

Background information
- Origin: Cardiff, Wales
- Genres: Progressive rock, hard rock, symphonic rock, heavy metal
- Years active: 1975–1978
- Labels: CBS, Windsong, Beat Goes On, Zoom Club
- Past members: Kenny Driscoll; Ray Jones; Jim Mathews; Tony Smith; Paul "Tonka" Chapman; Pete Hurley; Dixie Lee; Rick Worsnop; John Sloman

Lone Star was a Welsh rock and heavy metal music band formed in Cardiff in 1975. They released two albums on CBS Records before splitting up in 1978.

== History ==
An embryonic line-up consisted of former Iona members Kenny Driscoll and Tony Smith, former Quest bassist Ray Jones, and drummer Jim Mathews. The band took on the Lone Star moniker in early 1975 with bassist Pete Hurley and drummer Dixie Lee replacing Jones and Mathews, respectively, and the addition of Canadian keyboardist Rick Worsnop and guitarist Paul "Tonka" Chapman (a cousin of famed Welsh rocker Dave Edmunds), the latter whose credits included the bands Universe, Skid Row (where he had replaced Gary Moore), Kimla Taz, and most notably, UFO, in a short-lived 1974 dual guitar configuration alongside Michael Schenker. They raised £300 and recorded a five-song demo tape (The Acorn Sessions) at a studio near Oxford, with four of the five songs appearing in re-recorded form on their first two albums. The demo brought interest from manager Steve Wood, and after a bidding war, they signed a worldwide deal with CBS Records (which Driscoll would later describe as "the worst record deal ever").

The band recorded a studio session for John Peel's BBC Radio 1 show in early 1976, and recorded their self-titled debut album in August 1976 at Sweet Silence studios in Copenhagen, with Roy Thomas Baker producing. Driscoll had suffered a broken collarbone in a car crash (that left his girlfriend paralysed from the neck down) shortly before recording the album, and claimed to have recorded all the vocals for the album in three hours while drunk, and was disappointed with the results. The album charted at No. 47 on the UK Albums Chart, and was supported by a UK tour with label mate Ted Nugent. A second Peel session was recorded in April 1976 and broadcast around the time of the first album's release that August. The band's profile would get a further boost with a BBC Radio 1 In Concert broadcast, recorded at the Paris Theatre in London on 23 September 1976, just before going on tour as openers for Mott in October 1976.

After friction between Driscoll and other band members, he left in 1977, and was replaced by 20-year-old John Sloman (ex-Trapper), with Abe Hoch taking over as manager from Wood. The band's third BBC studio session, with Sloman now on vocals, was recorded in February 1977, and broadcast in July of that year on Alan Freeman's Saturday Show. This was an experimental quadrophonic broadcast trialling the BBC's Matrix H system. The band's second album, Firing on All Six, produced by Gary Lyons and released in August 1977, bettered its predecessor and reached No. 36 on the UK Albums Chart. That same month, the band undertook their most high-profile gig yet with an appearance at the Reading Festival on 26 August, followed by a live broadcast on the BBC's Sight & Sound programme on 29 September, recorded at Queen Mary College in East London whilst sharing a bill with Canadian guitarist Pat Travers. Both the BBC In Concert and Sight & Sound broadcasts were released in 1994 as the BBC Radio One Live In Concert CD.

== Break-up and further activities ==
Lone Star were on hiatus for a period when Chapman was called upon by UFO to fill in for the absent Michael Schenker for part of their US tour with Rush. Upon his return the band began to prepare and demo material for a proposed third album but already on shaky ground and beset by management problems and tensions caused by Smith and Lee's interest in Scientology, Lone Star splintered in late 1978, CBS having pulled the plug due in part to the rapidly changing musical climate, with the rise of punk rock leaving bands like Lone Star seeming old fashioned. Tony Smith said "We were the right band at the wrong time, we lost popularity overnight when punk rock exploded on to the scene. I remember my girlfriend taking me to the Blitz Club in London's Covent Garden, when it was all kicking off with Steve Strange and everything. We waltzed in, and there's me with my long blond hair and white flared trousers".

Chapman re-joined UFO for good and went on to make four studio albums with the band before joining UFO bassist Pete Way in Waysted in the mid-1980s and settling in the US. Chapman worked as a guitar teacher in South Florida, where he was also a member of Gator Country, featuring members of the original Molly Hatchet. He died in June 2020.

Drummer Dixie Lee toured with Wild Horses in late 1978, before teaming up with John Sloman in the short-lived Pulsar. Lee also cut some demos with an early incarnation of Blizzard Of Ozz in 1980. In early 1983, he joined and toured with Welsh Rock Band "Red Sharks" playing several dates, then briefly joined metal act Persian Risk later that year. Sloman joined British rockers Uriah Heep for their controversial Conquest album in 1980, before forming John Sloman's Badlands with guitarist John Sykes in 1982 and guesting with Gary Moore on the Rockin' Every Night – Live in Japan album. Sloman embarked on a solo career in the mid-1980s and has since released several albums, including the Todd Rundgren produced-Disappearances Can Be Deceptive in 1989.

After exiting Lone Star, Driscoll briefly fronted Hiding Place. They recorded one Peel session for BBC Radio 1 on 19 December 1977, which was broadcast on 5 January 1978; This session appears to be their only recorded output. As well as Driscoll, Hiding Place included guitarist Tich Gwilym (ex-Kimla Taz), bassist Dave Dawson, drummer Rob Allen, and keyboardist Paul Abrahams. Driscoll, Gwilym and Allen, along with former Iona/Quest bassist Ray Jones, also featured in the oddly named Tom the Lord but the band disintegrated in its formative stages despite interest from Epic Records.

With Lone Star now disbanded, Driscoll and long time friend Steve Jones adopted the 'Lone Star' moniker in 1979, recorded an album at Rockfield Studios and tried unsuccessfully to obtain a new recording contract. They played some gigs in 1980, including shows at Bournemouth Winter Gardens, Keele University and Nottingham Boat Club. Steve Jones left the band sometime in 1980 and Gary Moore joined to complete some outstanding gigs and Lone Star disbanded. Driscoll briefly joined Gary Moore's band in 1980 and sang on the Live At The Marquee album. He currently fronts the Kenny Driscoll Band, a Welsh pub/club band Steve Jones joined the Kenny Driscoll Band some years later.

Following Lone Star's demise, Tony Smith teamed up in Screen Idols with former the Rats trio – drummer Mike "Woody" Woodmansey (David Bowie, U-Boat), bassist Geoff Appleby (Hunter-Ronson Band), and guitarist Keith "Ched" Cheeseman – and vocalist Michelle Nieddu. The band's sole album, Premiere, came out in 1979. Following the departure of Nieddu and Cheeseman, Smith took over lead vocals on the band's third and final single, "Routine" b/w "Power Supply", issued in 1980, before Idols called it a day. The guitarist next turned up in Los Angeles, California, alongside fellow Brit Kal Swan (ex-Tytan) where the two formed Lyon, quickly renamed Lion, although Smith was not part of the band's recorded output. Smith briefly joint forces with "Red Sharks" Guitarist Rob Mills and Sam Aronson, Smith can now be found in the band the Daggers doing the live circuit around Wales.

Pete Hurley was part of Welsh roots rockers, the Red Hot Pokers, all through the 1990s and joined Sloman in a project called Beat Poets in 1999. Hurley released Dancin' Mood with the Pokers in 2001, the group also being credited with backing both rock'n'roll pioneer Jerry Lee Lewis his sister, Linda Gail Lewis, live and in the studio on different occasions. Recording the You Win Again album in 2000 with Linda and Northern Irish icon, Van Morrison, would lead to The Red Hot Pokers becoming Morrison's new live band, with Hurley also contributing bass to Morrison's 2002 album, Down the Road. Hurley is still an in-demand session player who works with a number of different acts.

Rick Worsnop returned to Canada in 1979 to pursue a career as a software developer. He currently alternates solo keyboard recording with voice acting, and teaches systems analysis for a consulting company in Toronto.

A third Lone Star album, Riding High, was released by Paul Chapman, on the Zoom Club label in 2000. Produced without the participation of other band members, it consisted of demos recorded by Chapman plus previously unpublished Lone Star material.

Lone Star and Firing on All Six were re-issued as a 2-for-1 by BGO Records in 2004, and again in 2011 by Rock Candy Records, as newly re-mastered single CDs, with previously unreleased BBC sessions and live cuts added as bonus tracks on each album.

== Personnel ==
=== Former members ===
- Kenny Driscoll – vocals (1975–1977)
- Ray Jones – bass (1975)
- Jim Mathews – drums (1975)
- Tony Smith – guitars, backing vocals (1975–1978)
- Paul "Tonka" Chapman – guitars (1975–1978; died 2020)
- Pete Hurley – bass (1975–1978)
- Dixie Lee – drums, backing vocals (1975–1978)
- Rick Worsnop – keyboards, backing vocals (1975–1978)
- John Sloman – vocals (1977–1978)

== Discography ==
Studio albums

- Lone Star (1976), CBS
- Firing on All Six (1977), CBS
- Riding High (The Unreleased Third Album) (1999), Zoom Club
