= Run for Cover (Gary Moore album) =

Studio album by Gary Moore
- Released: 2 September 1985
- Studios: Marcus Music, Eel Pie Studios, Westside Studios, Sarm East Studios and AIR Studios, London, UK
- Genres: Hard rock; heavy metal; pop metal
- Length: 41:40
- Label: 10/Virgin
- Producers: Andy Johns, Gary Moore, Peter Collins, Beau Hill, Mike Stone

Gary Moore chronology
We Want Moore! (1984)	Run for Cover (1985)	Wild Frontier (1987)

Singles from Run for Cover
- 1. "Out in the Fields" Released: 6 May 1985; 2. "Empty Rooms" Released: 15 July 1985; 3. "Run for Cover" Released: 1985; 4. "Listen to Your Heartbeat" Released: 1985

Professional ratings
Review scores
Source	Rating
AllMusic	4/5 stars
Collector's Guide to Heavy Metal	5/10

Run for Cover is the fifth solo studio album by Northern Irish guitarist Gary Moore, released on 2 September 1985. It is often considered his breakthrough album.

The album includes the top 5 single "Out in the Fields" and a re-recording of the song "Empty Rooms", originally from Moore's previous album Victims of the Future, which became one of Moore's biggest solo successes, reaching No. 23 on the UK charts.

The album features many of Moore's musical friends, including Deep Purple bassist/vocalist Glenn Hughes, Paul Thompson of Roxy Music and Phil Lynott from Thin Lizzy. Lynott and Moore trade lead vocals on "Out in the Fields", while Lynott sings alone on "Military Man", an old Grand Slam track. "Out in the Fields" is about the turmoil in their native Ireland. Lynott also provided vocals for a re-recording of the Thin Lizzy classic "Still in Love with You", on which Moore originally played guitar; the track was initially issued as a B-side of "Out in the Fields", but is included on later remastered versions of the album.

== Track listings ==
All tracks are written by Gary Moore, except where indicated.

Side one
No.	Title	Writer(s)	Lead vocals	Length
1.	"Run for Cover"		Moore	4:13
2.	"Reach for the Sky"		Glenn Hughes	4:46
3.	"Military Man"	Phil Lynott, Laurence Archer, Mark Stanway	Lynott	5:40
4.	"Empty Rooms"	Moore, Neil Carter	Moore	4:17

Side two
No.	Title	Writer(s)	Lead vocals	Length
5.	"Out in the Fields"		Lynott & Moore	4:17
6.	"Nothing to Lose"		Hughes	4:41
7.	"Once in a Lifetime"		Moore	4:18
8.	"All Messed Up"	Moore, Carter	Hughes	4:52
9.	"Listen to Your Heartbeat"		Moore	4:31

CD release
No.	Title	Writer(s)	Lead vocals	Length
1.	"Run for Cover"		Moore	4:13
2.	"Reach for the Sky"		Hughes	4:46
3.	"Military Man"	Lynott, Archer, Stanway	Lynott	5:40
4.	"Empty Rooms"	Moore, Carter	Moore	4:17
5.	"Out of My System"		Hughes	4:01
6.	"Out in the Fields"		Lynott & Moore	4:17
7.	"Nothing to Lose"		Hughes	4:41
8.	"Once in a Lifetime"		Moore	4:18
9.	"All Messed Up"	Moore, Carter	Hughes	4:52
10.	"Listen to Your Heartbeat"		Moore	4:31

2002 remastered CD bonus tracks
No.	Title	Writer(s)	Lead vocals	Length
11.	"Still in Love with You"	Lynott	Lynott	5:59
12.	"Stop Messin' Around" (live at the Ulster Hall, Belfast, Northern Ireland, 17 December 1984)	Peter Green	Moore & Lynott	5:23
13.	"Murder in the Skies" (live at the Ulster Hall, Belfast, Northern Ireland, 17 December 1984)		Moore & Carter	4:09

== Personnel ==
All credits adapted from the original CD release.

- Gary Moore – guitar, lead vocals on tracks 1, 4, 6, 8 and 10, backing vocals, producer on tracks 3 and 11–13
- Glenn Hughes – bass guitar on tracks 1, 2, 6, 7 and 9, lead vocals on tracks 2, 5, 7, 9
- Phil Lynott – bass guitar on tracks 3, 5, 11 & 12, lead vocals on tracks 3 and 11, co-lead vocals on tracks 6 and 12, backing vocals on track 7
- Andy Richards – keyboards on tracks 1–6, 8, 10
- Neil Carter – keyboards on tracks 5, 7, 8, 10–13, backing vocals on tracks 1, 4, 7, 8, 10–13
- Don Airey – keyboards on tracks 3 and 6
- Bob Daisley – bass guitar on track 8 & 13
- Gary Ferguson – drums on tracks 1, 8, 9
- Charlie Morgan – drums and electronic drums on tracks 2, 3, 6
- Paul Thompson – drums on tracks 5, 7, 11–13
- James "Jimbo" Barton – sampled drums on track 4
- Keith Murrell – backing vocals on track 7 (uncredited)

Production

- Andy Johns – producer on tracks 1, 2 and 9
- Peter Collins – producer on tracks 4 and 6
- Beau Hill – producer on tracks 5 and 7
- Mike Stone – producer on tracks 8 and 10, mixing on tracks 1, 2, 7 and 9
- Stephen BenBen – engineer on tracks 3, 5 and 7
- James "Jimbo" Barton – engineer and mixing assistant on tracks 4 and 6
- Stuart Breed – assistant engineer on tracks 1, 2, 7, 9 and 10
- Mark Saunders – assistant engineer on tracks 8 and 10
- Tony Platt – engineer and mixing on tracks 11–13

== Charts ==
=== Album ===
Year	Chart	Position
1985	Swedish Albums Chart	6
1985	Norwegian Albums Chart	7
1985	Finnish Albums Chart	10
1985	UK Albums Chart	12
1985	New Zealand Albums Chart	23
1985	German Albums Chart	27
1985	Dutch MegaCharts	47
1985	Australian Albums Chart	73
1986	Billboard 200 (US)	146

=== Singles ===
Year	Single	Chart	Position
1985	"Out in the Fields"	Norwegian Singles Chart	2
1985	"Out in the Fields"	Swedish Singles Chart	2
1985	"Out in the Fields"	Irish Singles Chart	3
1985	"Out in the Fields"	UK Singles Chart	5
1985	"Out in the Fields"	German Singles Chart	14
1985	"Out in the Fields"	Dutch MegaCharts	21
1985	"Out in the Fields"	New Zealand Singles Chart	21
1985	"Out in the Fields"	Finnish Singles Chart	24
1985	"Out in the Fields"	Australian Singles Chart	62
1985	"Empty Rooms"	Irish Singles Chart	12
1985	"Empty Rooms"	UK Singles Chart	23
1985	"Empty Rooms"	New Zealand Singles Chart	48
1985	"Empty Rooms"	Australian Singles Chart	100

== Certifications ==
Certifications for Run for Cover
Region	Certification	Certified units/sales
Sweden (GLF)	Gold	50,000^{^}
United Kingdom (BPI)	Silver	60,000^{^}
^{^} Shipments figures based on certification alone.
