= Live in Stockholm 1963 =

Live album by John Coltrane
- Released: 1963
- Recorded: October 22, 1963
- Venue: Koncerthusen, Stockholm, Sweden
- Length: 41:27
- Label: Charly

Live in Stockholm 1963 is a 1963 album by jazz musician John Coltrane.

== Reception ==
Professional ratings
Review scores
Source	Rating
AllMusic	3/5 stars

In a review for AllMusic, Stephen Cook wrote: "As with most his live dates, Coltrane turns in extended explorations on all the selections, also leaving plenty of room for pianist Tyner to stretch out on more straightforward, but equally challenging solos. Drummer Jones matches the intensity of Coltrane's solo flights with propulsive and sensitive rhythmic support, while bassist Garrison anchors the proceedings with his steady and somewhat mercurial basslines... The blend of freedom, energy, and formality in his solos make live recordings from this time a good bet for newcomers to Coltrane's work."

== Track listing ==
Original CD release Live in Stockholm 1963 (Charly).

1. "Traneing In" — 11:40
2. "Mr. P.C." — 18:26
3. "Naima" — 6:45
4. "The Promise" — 6:55
5. "Spiritual"— 11:21
6. "I Want To Talk About You" — 9:09
7. "Impressions" — 11:15

== Personnel ==
Recorded October 22, 1963.

- John Coltrane — tenor saxophone/soprano saxophone
- McCoy Tyner — piano
- Jimmy Garrison — double bass
- Elvin Jones — drums
