= Too Late to Cry (Widowmaker album) =

Studio album by Widowmaker
- Released: March 1977
- Recorded: December 1976–January 1977
- Studios: Olympic Studios, London
- Genre: Rock
- Label: Jet
- Producers: Chris Kimsey; Widowmaker

Widowmaker chronology
| Widowmaker (1976) | Too Late to Cry (1977) | Straight Faced Fighters (2002) |

Professional ratings
Review scores
| Source | Rating |
|---|---|
| AllMusic | 4/5 stars |

Too Late to Cry is the second and final album by the English hard rock band Widowmaker, released in 1977.

== Track listing ==
1. "Too Late To Cry" (Daisley)
2. "The Hustler" (Daisley, Grosvenor)
3. "What a Way to Fall" (Daisley)
4. "Here Comes the Queen" (Grosvenor)
5. "Mean What You Say" (lyrics: Butler, music: Langton)
6. "Something I Can Do Without" (lyrics: Daisley, music: Daisley, Grosvenor)
7. "Sign the Papers" (lyrics: Butler, music: Daisley)
8. "Pushin' 'n' Pullin'" (John Farnham)
9. "Sky Blues" (lyrics: Butler, music: Daisley, Nichols, Grosvenor)

== Personnel ==
- John Butler – vocals, harmonica, keyboards
- Ariel Bender – guitar
- Huw Lloyd-Langton – guitar
- Bob Daisley – bass
- Paul Nichols – drums

Additional personnel

- Danny Styles – Hammond B-3 organ
- Miguel Barradas – steel drums on "The Hustler"
- Gered Mankowitz - photography
