= Riding High (Canadian TV program) =

Canadian television program

- Genre: Music
- Starring: Ron Beckett; Eleanor Collins; The Four Bits; Don Francks; Pat Kirkpatrick
- Country of origin: Canada
- Original language: English
- No. of seasons: 1

Production
- Producer: Mario Prizek
- Production location: Vancouver
- Running time: 30 minutes

Original release
- Network: CBC Television
- Release: 18 November – 30 December 1955

Riding High is a Canadian music television program that aired on CBC Television in 1955.

== Premise ==
This Vancouver-produced program featured a different locale in each episode, such as a historic music hall or a western saloon.

== Broadcast ==
This half-hour program was broadcast on Fridays at 9:00 p.m. (Eastern time) from 18 November to 30 December 1955.
