= Neil Carter (musician) =

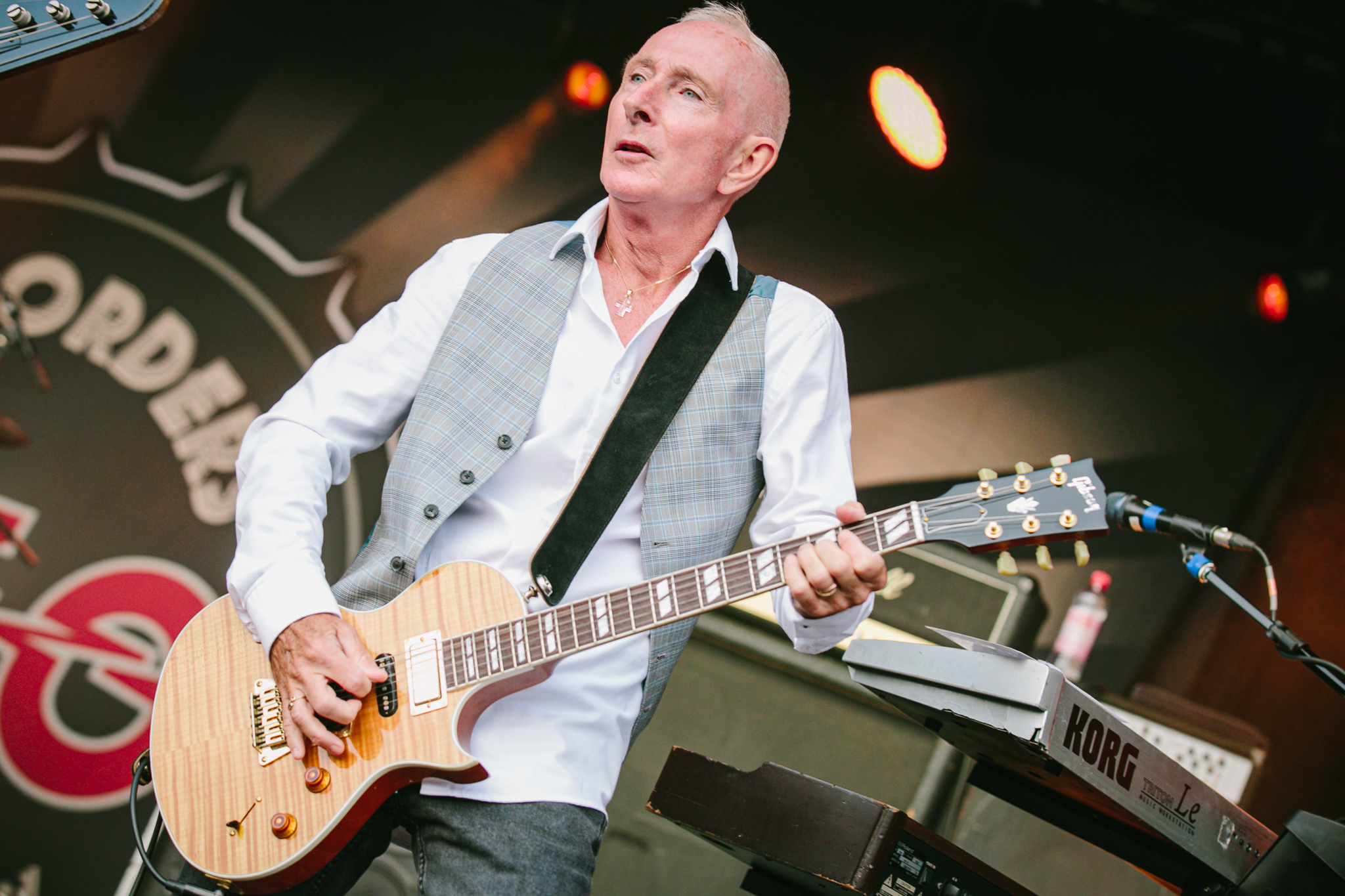
- Carter with UFO at Burg Herzberg Festival 2019

Background information
- Born: Neil Andrew Carter; 11 May 1958 (age 68); Bedfont, Middlesex, England
- Genres: Classical; jazz; hard rock; heavy metal
- Occupations: Musician; songwriter; examiner
- Instruments: Keyboards; guitar; bass guitar; saxophone; clarinet; flute; vocals
- Website: Official website

Neil Andrew Carter (born 11 May 1958) is an English musician who has worked in diverse genres throughout his career.

Classically trained on the clarinet and piano, he became a professional rock musician at 17 and had his first "mainstream" experience with singer-songwriter Gilbert O'Sullivan. He subsequently played guitar and keyboard for the hard rock band UFO (from August 1980 until their first breakup in 1983), guitarist Gary Moore, and Wild Horses. He is credited with co-writing a number of Gary Moore's songs, including the worldwide hit "Empty Rooms".

At 30, he left the rock world and developed a different career as a teacher of woodwind (saxophone and clarinet). He became an ABRSM music examiner in 2003. 2010 saw an unexpected return to rock with Gary Moore, playing festivals across Europe and a tour of Ukraine and Russia. Future tours and a Celtic rock album were to follow, but this was curtailed by the death of Gary Moore in February 2011. In 2014, he retired from Brighton College and moved permanently to his home in Lanzarote.

On 30 April 2019, it was announced that he would return to UFO for their 'Last Orders' tour, following the death of Paul Raymond, with Carter replacing Raymond. The tour began in June 2019 in Germany and continued into 2022 after being postponed from 2020 due to the COVID-19 pandemic. Following this tour, UFO called it quits once again in April 2024.

In 2024, 'Moggs Motel', an album from the musical project of the same name, in which he participated and composed, and featuring UFO's Phil Mogg, was released.

== Brighton College career ==
Carter taught at Brighton College, from January 1993 to July 2014 holding the position of "Head of Woodwind and Brass". He taught one-on-one lessons on clarinet and saxophone. Carter was the conductor of the school Concert Band, and the school Saxophone Ensemble and led the School's Swing Band.

== Discography ==
=== With UFO ===
- 1981 The Wild, the Willing and the Innocent (track 6)
- 1982 Mechanix
- 1983 Making Contact
- 1983 Headstone - live album

=== With Wild Horses ===
- 1980 Wild Horses

=== With Gary Moore ===
- 1983 Victims of the Future
- 1984 We Want Moore!
- 1985 Run for Cover (tracks 5, 7, 8, 10–13)
- 1987 Wild Frontier
- 1989 After the War (tracks 1–5, 9–11)
- 2010 Live at Montreux 2010

=== With Moggs Motel ===
- 2024 Moggs Motel

=== Other projects ===
- 2026 Dustin Tomsen - "MORE! Milk & Beer" (track 1 & 8)

== See also ==
- Brighton College
- UFO
- Gary Moore
