= Making Contact (album) =

Studio album by UFO
- Released: January 1983
- Recorded: August–December 1982
- Studios: The Manor Studio, Shipton-on-Cherwell, Oxfordshire; Townhouse Studios; White House Studios; Maison Rouge Studios, London
- Genres: Hard rock, heavy metal
- Length: 39:50
- Label: Chrysalis
- Producer: Mick Glossop

UFO chronology
Mechanix (1982)	Making Contact (1983)	Misdemeanor (1985)

Singles from Making Contact
- 1. "When It's Time to Rock" Released: 4 March 1983

Professional ratings
Review scores
Source	Rating
AllMusic	2/5 stars
Collector's Guide to Heavy Metal	8/10
The Encyclopedia of Popular Music	2/5 stars

Making Contact is the eleventh studio album by English hard rock band UFO, released in January 1983. It was their first album without founder and bassist Pete Way. UFO disbanded after an unsuccessful European tour and a few UK dates in 1983.

== Recording ==
Recording commenced with Gary Lyons, who had produced the band's previous album, Mechanix. Phil Mogg said, "We had to sack Gary after about 4 weeks when we realised we were paying him a lot of money and he wasn't doing very much." Neil Carter added, "Mick's a very hard working bloke, whereas Lyons would only be there for 10 minutes a day."

== Track listing ==
Side one
No.	Title	Writer(s)	Length
1.	"Blinded by a Lie"	Neil Carter, Phil Mogg	3:58
2.	"Diesel in the Dust"	Carter, Mogg	4:29
3.	"A Fool for Love"	Carter, Mogg	3:57
4.	"You and Me"	Carter, Mogg	3:20
5.	"When It's Time to Rock"	Paul Chapman, Mogg	5:26

Side two
No.	Title	Writer(s)	Length
6.	"The Way the Wild Wind Blows"	Carter, Chapman, Mogg	4:14
7.	"Call My Name"	Carter, Mogg	3:14
8.	"All Over You"	Carter, Mogg	4:24
9.	"No Getaway"	Carter, Chapman, Mogg	3:32
10.	"Push, It's Love"	Carter, Mogg	3:16
Total length:			39:50

2009 Remastered edition bonus tracks
No.	Title	Writer(s)	Notes	Length
11.	"Everybody Knows"	Chapman, Mogg	B-side «When It's Time to Rock»	3:36
12.	"When It's Time to Rock"		Live from Birmingham, 26 March 1983	5:48
13.	"Blinded by a Lie"		Live from Oxford, 25 March 1983	3:48
Total length:				53:02

== Personnel ==
UFO

- Phil Mogg – vocals (all tracks)
- Paul Chapman – lead guitar (all tracks), bass (2–4, 6, 7, 10, 11), fretless bass (4)
- Neil Carter – keyboards (1, 3–8, 10), rhythm guitar (2, 3, 7, 10), bass (1, 5, 8, 9), backing vocals (2, 3, 5–10), twelve-string guitar (1), Prophet-5 synthesiser (2), Hammond organ (6), Korg synthesiser (9)
- Andy Parker – drums (all tracks)
- Paul Gray – bass on bonus tracks 12 & 13

Production

- Mick Glossop – producer, engineer
- Peter Thea, Richard Mainwaring – engineers
- Gavin McKillop, Keith Nixon, Leigh Mantle – assistant engineers
- Alan Adler – illustration
- John Pasche, Andrew Ellis – art direction

== Charts ==
Chart (1983)	Peak position
Canada Top Albums/CDs (RPM)	97
Swedish Albums (Sverigetopplistan)	35
UK Albums (Official Charts)	32
US Billboard 200	153
