= Mechanix (album) =

Studio album by UFO
- Released: February 1982
- Recorded: 1981
- Studios: Mountain (Attalens, Switzerland); The Manor (Shipton-on-Cherwell, Oxfordshire); Scorpio Sound and Maison Rouge (London)
- Genres: Hard rock, heavy metal
- Length: 44:44
- Label: Chrysalis
- Producer: Gary Lyons

UFO chronology
The Wild, the Willing and the Innocent (1981)	Mechanix (1982)	Making Contact (1983)

Singles from Mechanix
- 1. "Let It Rain" Released: January 1982; 2. "Back into My Life" Released: April 1982

Professional ratings
Review scores
Source	Rating
AllMusic	2.5/5 stars
Collector's Guide to Heavy Metal	8/10
The Encyclopedia of Popular Music	2/5 stars

Mechanix is the tenth studio album by English rock band UFO, released in February 1982 by Chrysalis Records.

"When we got into pre-production, Asia were practising upstairs in the big room and we were downstairs in the little one. But we mostly just sat around looking at each other, or would go upstairs and listen to Asia, just for something to do. Or go down the pub. By then, Neil [Carter, keyboardist] was involved and he had some ideas, but a lot of them were softer, keyboard-oriented. And Pete [Way, bassist] was like, 'Hmm, I'm not too sure about this.' But that album really has its moments." – Paul Chapman

Music press adverts carried the tagline, 'Mechanix: it will tighten your nuts.'

Immediately after the accompanying tour, founding member Way left to join former Motörhead guitarist "Fast" Eddie Clarke in Fastway.

Mechanix was reissued in 1994 on Repertoire Records. It was also reissued in 2009, remastered and with an expanded booklet and bonus tracks.

== Track listing ==
Side one
No.	Title	Writer(s)	Length
1.	"The Writer"	Neil Carter, Paul Chapman, Phil Mogg	4:12
2.	"Somethin' Else"	Eddie Cochran, Sharon Sheeley	3:21
3.	"Back into My Life"	Mogg, Pete Way	4:59
4.	"You'll Get Love"	Carter, Chapman, Mogg	3:10
5.	"Doing It All for You"	Carter, Chapman, Mogg, Way	5:02

Side two
No.	Title	Writer(s)	Length
6.	"We Belong to the Night"	Carter, Mogg, Way	3:57
7.	"Let It Rain"	Carter, Mogg, Way	4:01
8.	"Terri"	Chapman, Mogg	3:53
9.	"Feel It"	Mogg, Way	4:07
10.	"Dreaming"	Carter, Mogg	3:57

Japanese release bonus track
No.	Title	Writer(s)	Length
11.	"Heel of a Stranger"	Carter, Chapman, Mogg, Way	4:05

2009 Digital Remastered edition bonus tracks
No.	Title	Length
12.	"We Belong to the Night" (live in Oxford, 25 March 1983)	4:34
13.	"Let It Rain" (live in Oxford, 25 March 1983)	3:07
14.	"Doing It All for You" (soundcheck at The Birmingham Odeon, 26 March 1983)	5:21

=== 2026 Deluxe Edition ===
Disc one
No.	Title	Length
11.	"Heel Of A Stranger (B-Side of "Let It Rain")"
12.	"Back Into My Life (Single Edit)"	3:50

Disc two - Live at the Hammersmith Odeon, London, 28 January 1982
No.	Title	Length
1.	"We Belong To The Night"
2.	"Let It Rain"
3.	"Long Gone"
4.	"The Wild, The Willing And The Innocent"
5.	"Only You Can Rock Me"
6.	"No Place To Run"
7.	"Love To Love"
8.	"Doing It All For You"
9.	"Makin' Moves"
10.	"Too Hot To Handle"
11.	"Mystery Train"

== Personnel ==
UFO

- Phil Mogg – vocals
- Paul Chapman – lead guitar
- Neil Carter – keyboards, rhythm guitar, backing vocals, sax, orchestral arrangements
- Pete Way – bass
- Andy Parker – drums

Production

- Gary Lyons – producer, engineer, orchestral arrangements
- Peter Thea – engineer
- George Marino – mastering at Sterling Sound, New York
- John Pasche – cover design

== Charts ==
Chart (1982)	Peak position
Swedish Albums (Sverigetopplistan)	38
UK Albums (Official Charts)	8
Billboard 200	82
