= Gregg Dechert =

Canadian musician

Gregg Dechert (born May 11, 1952, in Listowel, Ontario, Canada) is a Canadian keyboardist and guitarist. He was the keyboardist for Uriah Heep between July 1980 and March 1981, replacing Ken Hensley. He also performed keyboards and vocals with David Gilmour on his first solo tour, appearing on its video live album. He played with Bad Company on their comeback album Fame and Fortune in 1986 and its accompanying tour on keyboards and guitar. He also played with The Dream Academy, Feather Wheel, Trev John, Pulsar, Mike Maves, Cajun Moon and In A World. Gregg is currently working on a project called BORN WILD with Brtish Canadian musician Joe Brett aka SUPERJOE .

== Discography ==
- Fame and Fortune – Bad Company (1986)
- The Dream Academy – The Dream Academy (1985)
- Featherwheel – Featherwheel
- Standpoint – Trev John
- This Side Of Town – Mike Maves
- "Think It Over" (single) – Uriah Heep (1980)
- "Heart of A Lion (Maestro Anjael)
