= No Place to Run (album) =

Studio album by UFO
- Released: January 1980
- Recorded: 1979
- Studios: AIR (Salem, Montserrat); AIR (London, UK)
- Genres: Hard rock, heavy metal
- Length: 36:08
- Label: Chrysalis
- Producer: George Martin

UFO chronology
Strangers in the Night (1979)	No Place to Run (1980)	The Wild, the Willing and the Innocent (1981)

Singles from No Place to Run
- 1. "Young Blood" Released: January 1980

Professional ratings
Review scores
Source	Rating
AllMusic	1.5/5 stars
Collector's Guide to Heavy Metal	10/10
The Encyclopedia of Popular Music	2/5 stars

No Place to Run is the eighth studio album by English rock band UFO, released in January 1980 by Chrysalis Records. It was the band's first record to feature Paul Chapman, who replaced Michael Schenker on lead guitar.

The album was produced by George Martin, best known for his work with The Beatles. The album cover appeared in different varieties in the UK, although the only difference was the colour of the title. The album yielded one single: "Young Blood".

"At the time, I thought No Place to Run sounded a bit flat with George Martin's mix", remarked Chapman in 2009, when a remastered version was released, with an expanded booklet and bonus tracks. "And I still do, kind of, but it's nowhere near as flat as I first thought."

As of 2025, the last two surviving band members to play on the album are vocalist Phil Mogg and drummer Andy Parker.

== Track listing ==
Side one
No.	Title	Writer(s)	Length
1.	"Alpha Centauri"	Paul Chapman	2:06
2.	"Lettin' Go"	Phil Mogg, Pete Way	3:51
3.	"Mystery Train"	Herman Parker Jr., Sam Phillips	3:55
4.	"This Fire Burns Tonight"	Chapman, Mogg	4:13
5.	"Gone in the Night"	Mogg, Way	3:47

Side two
No.	Title	Writer(s)	Length
6.	"Young Blood"	Mogg, Way	3:59
7.	"No Place to Run"	Mogg, Way	3:58
8.	"Take It or Leave It"	Paul Raymond	3:01
9.	"Money, Money"	Mogg, Way	3:29
10.	"Anyday"	Mogg, Way	3:48

CD edition bonus tracks
No.	Title	Length
11.	"Gone in the Night" (alternative studio version)	4:05
12.	"Lettin' Go" (recorded live at The Marquee, London, 16/11/80)	3:47
13.	"Mystery Train" (recorded live at The Marquee, London, 16/11/80)	6:08
14.	"No Place to Run" (recorded live at The Marquee, London, 16/11/80)	3:46

== Personnel ==
UFO

- Phil Mogg – vocals
- Paul Chapman – lead guitar
- Paul Raymond – keyboards, rhythm guitar, backing vocals
- Pete Way – bass
- Andy Parker – drums

Production

- George Martin – producer, mixing
- Geoff Emerick – engineer, mixing
- Steve Churchyard – assistant engineer
- John Wall – tape operator (Montserrat)
- Nigel Walker – tape operator (London)

== Charts ==
Chart (1980)	Peak position
Canada Top Albums/CDs (RPM)	91
Norwegian Albums (VG-lista)	33
Swedish Albums (Sverigetopplistan)	44
UK Albums (Official Charts)	11
US Billboard 200	51

Chart (2009)	Peak position
UK Rock & Metal Albums (Official Charts)	38

== Certifications ==
Region	Certification	Certified units/sales
United Kingdom (BPI)	Silver	60,000^{^}
^{^} Shipments figures based on certification alone.
