= Thyrfing =

Swedish Viking metal band

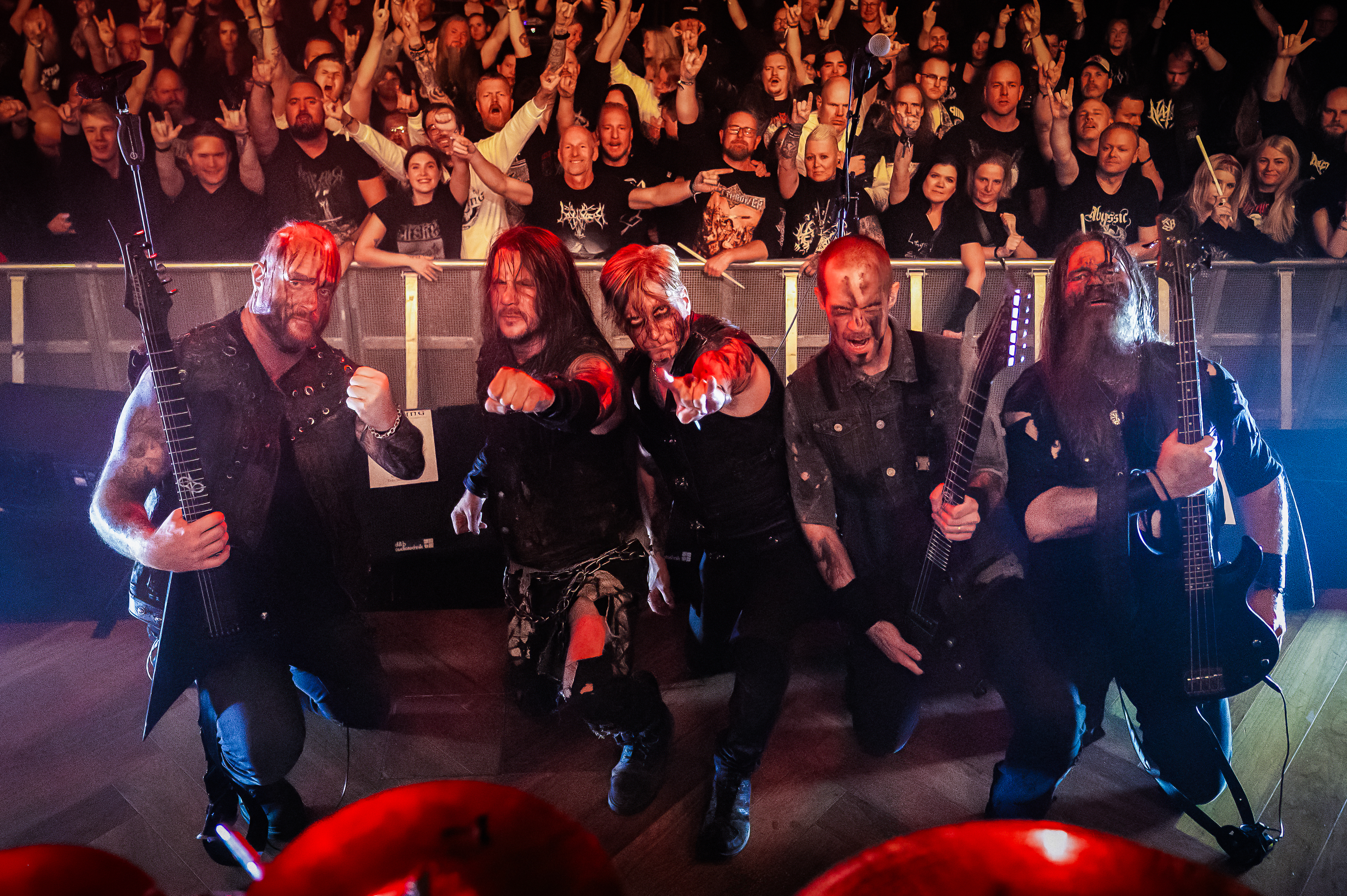
- Thyrfing at Southern Discomfort metal festival in Norway, 2025

Background information
- Origin: Stockholm, Sweden
- Genre: Viking metal
- Years active: 1995–present
- Label: Regain Records
- Members: Jens Rydén; Patrik Lindgren; Fredrik Hernborg; Dennis Ekdahl; Peter Löf; Joakim Kristensson
- Past members: Vintras; Thomas Väänänen; Henrik Svegsjö
- Website: thyrfing.com

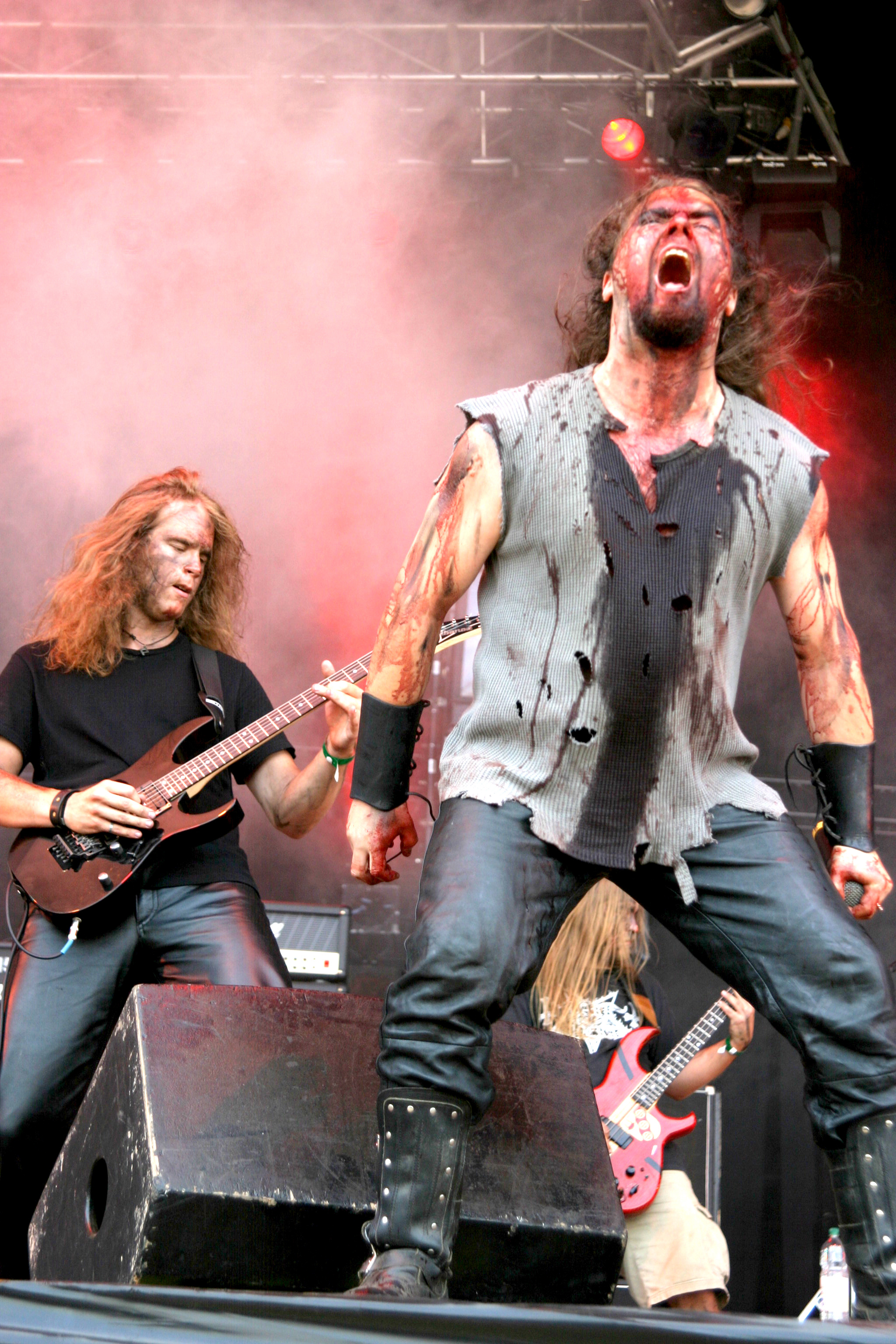
Thyrfing at Wacken Open Air 2003

Thyrfing is a viking metal band from Sweden. The band is named after the royal sword Tyrfing from Norse mythology.

== History ==
Thyrfing was formed in 1995 by Patrik Lindgren (guitar), Jocke Kristensson (drums), Peter Löf (keyboard) and Kimmy Sjölund (bass guitar). Northern mythology and the Viking age was an interest of all the members. After two demo tapes that gained a lot of positive response in the underground scene, Thyrfing signed to the Dutch record label Hammerheart Records in 1997. In Stockholm's Sunlight Studio in Stockholm, their debut album was recorded, showing a much more varied songwriting. The album was then released in March 1998. For their second album, this time recorded in the Abyss Studios, their music took on a more symphonic approach. For future live performances, Henke Svegsjö from Winds was recruited on guitar. Once again with Tommy Tägtgren, Urkraft was recorded and released in August 2000. During that same year, the band also held two mini-tours with Primordial and Shadowbreed throughout The Netherlands, Belgium and Germany.

In the autumn of 2001, the band entered Dug-Out Studio with producer Daniel Bergstrand to record Vansinnesvisor (English: Songs of Madness). The album was released in July the following year

To support the album, Thyrfing played two gigs during the winter (for Freedom Call and Dismember) in Stockholm, and did a small headliner tour in Benelux with Cruachan and Shadowbreed.

2003 followed with further live-promotion, such as the Generation Armageddon Festivals (including Ancient Rites, Septic Flesh, Primordial, Blood Red Throne and Skyfire), a 12-day European tour throughout Europe, and performances on the main festival stages of 2000 Decibel in Sweden and Wacken Open Air in Germany.

Thyrfing entered EMI studios on 18 April 2005 to record their new album, Farsotstider ("Times of Plague"), which was released on 21 November 2005.

The band played their first US show in January 2006 alongside Moonsorrow and Primordial at the Heathen Crusade metalfest in Columbia Heights, Minnesota.

On 13 March 2007, the band posted a message on the official Thyrfing site declaring that Thomas Väänänen (vocals) and Henrik Svegsjö (guitars) had decided to leave the band due to lack of motivation. Instead of Thomas, founder and ex-vocalist of Naglfar, Jens Rydén, is currently handling the vocals. The band also decided to continue with one guitarist.

In October 2008, Thyrfing released their album Hels vite. Their latest album, Vanagandr was released 27 August, 2021.

== Members ==
=== Current members ===
- Jens Rydén – vocals (2007–present)
- Patrik Lindgren – guitars (1995–present)
- Fredrik Hernborg – guitars (2008–present)
- Joakim Kristensson – bass (2012–present), keyboards (2014–present), drums (1995–2012), vocals (1995–1996)
- Dennis Ekdahl – drums (2012–present)

=== Former band members ===
- Peter Löf – keyboards (1995–2014)
- Kimmy Sjölund – bass (1995–2012)
- Thomas Väänänen – vocals (1996–2006)
- Vintras – guitars (1998)
- Henrik Svegsjö – guitars (1998–2007)

== Discography ==
=== Studio albums ===
- Thyrfing (1998)
- Valdr Galga (1999)
- Urkraft (2000)
- Vansinnesvisor (2002)
- Farsotstider (2005)
- Hels vite (2008)
- De Ödeslösa (2013)
- Vanagandr (2021)

=== Compilation albums ===
- Hednaland (CD) (1999)

=== Demos ===
- Solen svartnar (Demo) (1995)
- Hednaland (Demo) (1996)
