= Paul Chapman (musician) =

Welsh rock guitarist (1954–2020)

Background information
- Also known as: Tonka
- Born: Paul William Chapman; 9 June 1954; Cardiff, Wales
- Died: 9 June 2020 (aged 66)
- Genres: Hard rock, blues-rock, progressive rock, heavy metal
- Occupation: Musician
- Instrument: Guitar
- Years active: 1968–2020
- Formerly of: Universe, Skid Row, Lone Star, UFO, Kimla Taz, Gator Country, Killer Bee

Paul William Chapman (9 June 1954 – 9 June 2020) was a Welsh rock guitarist best known for his work in bands such as UFO and Lone Star. He was well known by his nickname "Tonka", allegedly acquired because of his indestructible qualities.

== Early career ==
Chapman's first notable band was the Welsh outfit Universe. Chapman toured Germany with his "first band" when he was 12, either in 1966 or 1967. Chapman then joined Skid Row in December 1971 replacing Gary Moore as guitarist. His tenure was brief, lasting only until July 1972. His next band was Kimla Taz, with whom he was a guitarist from December 1972 to May 1974.

Chapman first joined UFO in 1974 as a second guitarist to augment their live sound, after answering an advert in the UK music paper Melody Maker. He auditioned at the Unity Theatre in London. Although Chapman did not record an album during this period, he did join in time to tour and promote the Phenomenon album. However, he can be heard with the band on several tracks from the BBC live sessions album, which was released retrospectively. He left UFO in January 1975 due to personal differences with the band, and went on to form Lone Star, where he remained until June 1978.

In 1977, he filled in for Michael Schenker in UFO when they were on tour with Rush in the United States during one of the German guitarist's absences.

== UFO years ==
After resuming with Lone Star following the tour, Chapman later rejoined UFO in December 1978 on a full-time basis after Schenker parted company with the band. By this time, UFO was an international success and about to release their live album, Strangers in the Night, which raised their profile further. Chapman is acknowledged on the album but did not play on it. "You'd be able to hear it," Schenker observed. Producer Ron Nevison agreed, "I've never even met Paul Chapman."

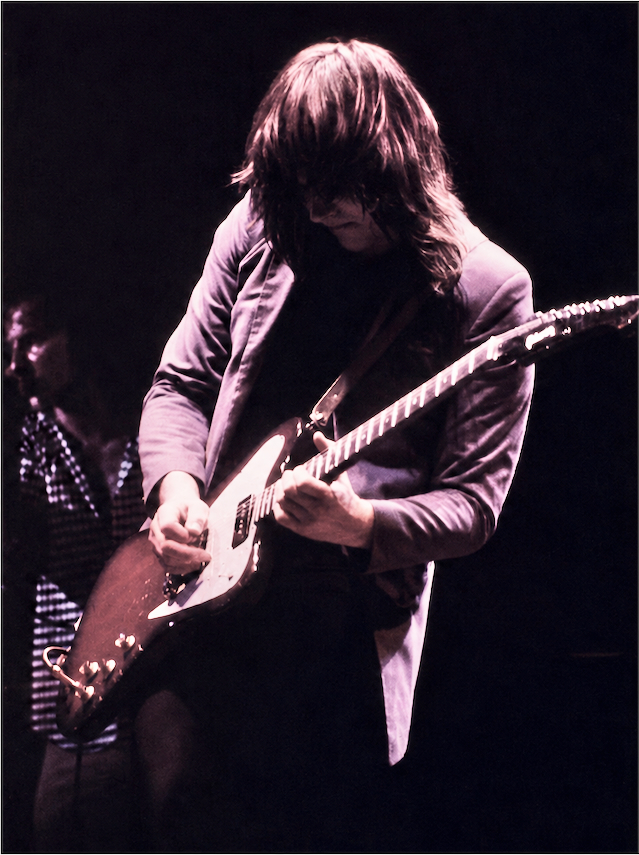
Paul Chapman performing with UFO at the International Amphitheatre, Chicago, 1980

Chapman recorded his first album with UFO – No Place to Run – with ex-Beatles producer George Martin. It was released in January 1980. UFO undertook a tour to promote it, culminating in a five-night sell-out at London's Hammersmith Odeon.

Chapman remained in UFO until 1983 and played on another three albums: The Wild, the Willing and the Innocent (1981), Mechanix (1982), and Making Contact. In 1983, after numerous line-up changes, UFO decided to call it a day and undertook a farewell tour (although they reformed in 1984). The posthumous compilation album Headstone incorporated songs by the members' other bands. Chapman was represented by a Lone Star song. The album was completed with several songs from the farewell tour.

== Post UFO ==
After the tour, Chapman went to Florida, United States, to form a new band DOA fronted by lead singers Ray Williams, Dave Edwards, Bass player Steve Chikitus, guitarists Jon Smyth, Robert Journey and Drummer Paul Baron. Paul's Florida band DOA was later renamed Madman, which toured with Ted Nugent in the United States. He later hooked up with former UFO band member Pete Way in Waysted and recorded the albums The Good the Bad the Waysted and Save Your Prayers. After this, Chapman founded Ghost in 1993, fronted by another Welshman, Carl Sentance.

In 1993, Chapman was lined up as the guitarist for a reformed UFO, but Michael Schenker was employed instead.

Chapman released an album, Anthology Volume One, on his own Paul Chapman Enterprises label, which covered his career from Lone Star through to Ghost. A solo instrumental track, "The Bells of Berlin" appeared as part of the December 2000 archive Waysted collection Your Prayers Are Saved.

He played on a Nazareth tribute album released in 2001, Another Hair of the Dog, on two tracks, "This Flight Tonight" and "Let Me Be Your Dog".

His next appearance was in late 2002, when he guested with former Virgin Steele guitarist Jack Starr's new band project, Jack Starr and the Guardians of the Flame, for the February 2003 album, Under A Savage Sky. Following this, Chapman and Pete Way reformed Waysted along with original singer Fin. After completing a new album, Chapman resigned from the band in November 2004.

Chapman also went on to form a new band, PCP (Paul Chapman Project), along with a book he has been writing titled "Tonka Tales".

Chapman gave music lessons from his own studio in Palm Bay, Florida. In May 2006, he announced he was planning to re-record classic UFO songs. He enlisted the help of Robin McAuley, who sang on versions of "No Place To Run", "Wild, Willing & Innocent" and "The Writer" cut at Garudio Studios in Palm Bay.

In July 2006, Chapman joined the American southern rock band Gator Country, a collection of Molly Hatchet veterans.

In 2015, Chapman went out for a 10-week US tour with the Swedish/Canadian band Killer Bee, and he also recorded on their album Eye in the Sky.

Prior to his death, Chapman taught music one-on-one at his studio in downtown Melbourne, Florida.

== Personal life and death ==
Chapman died of a heart attack on his 66th birthday on 9 June 2020. He left sons, a daughter, nine grandsons and two granddaughters. He was a cousin of fellow South-Wales musician Dave Edmunds.
