= List of UFO members =

UFO members

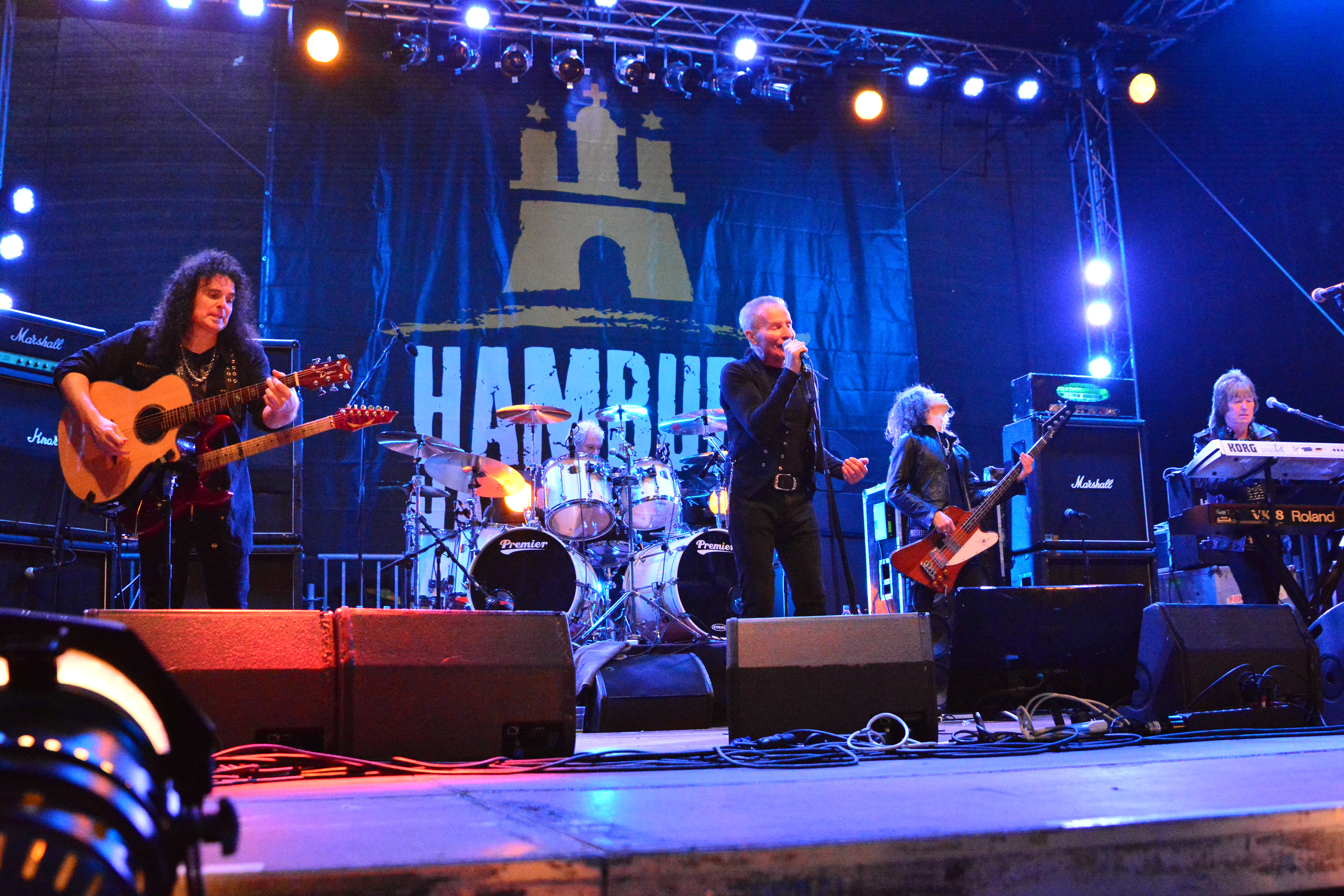
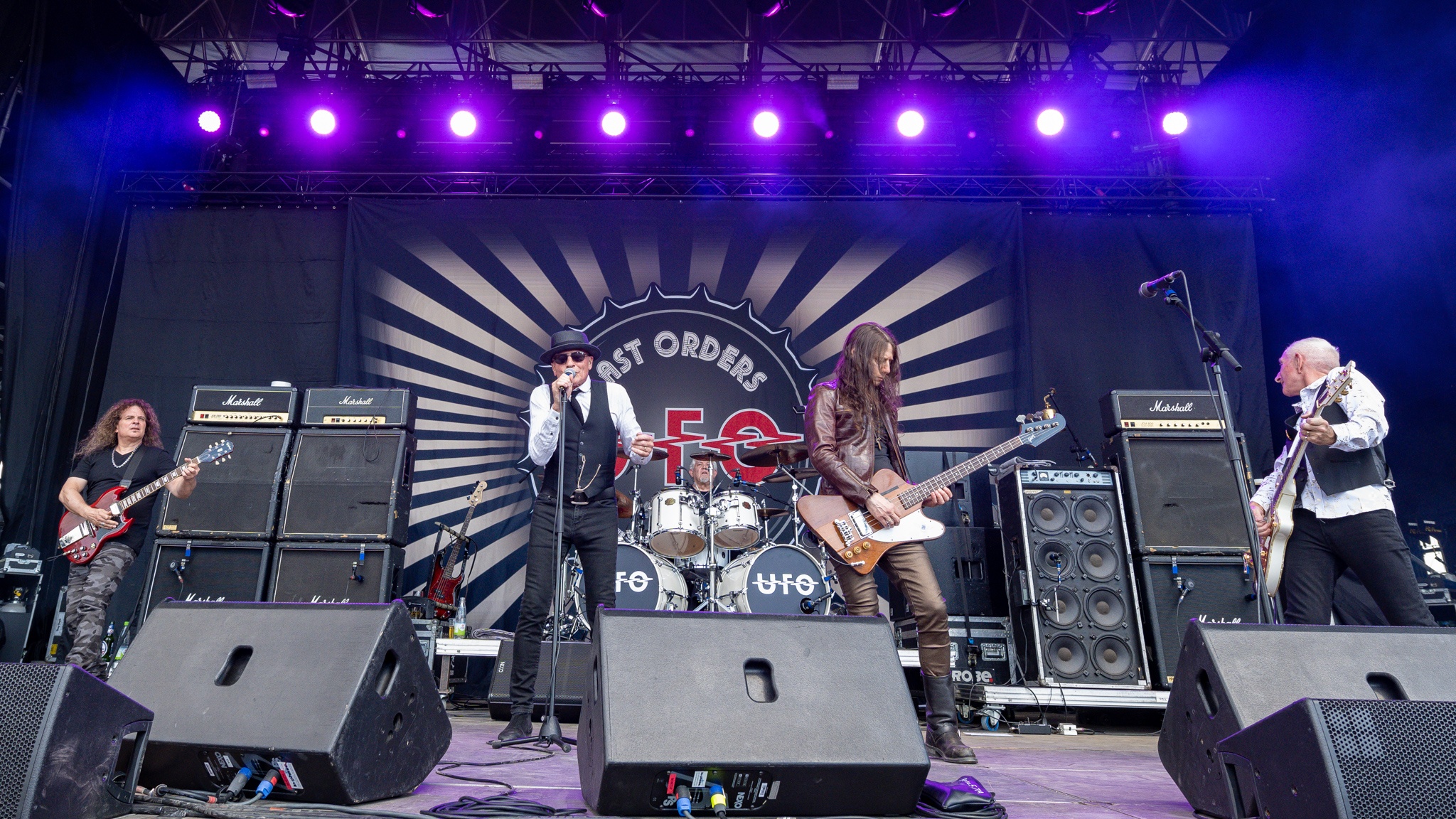
UFO performing in 2015 and 2022.

UFO were an English hard rock band from London. Formed in 1968 under the name The Boyfriends, the group originally consisted guitarist Mick Bolton, bassist Pete Way and drummer Tick Torrazo. Torrazo was replaced by Colin Turner. Lead vocalist Phil Mogg joined. Turner was then replaced by Andy Parker in August 1969 and the group became known as Hocus Pocus, until, in October of that same year, being renamed UFO .

The final lineup of the band included original members Mogg and Parker, plus lead guitarist Vinnie Moore (since 2003), bassist Rob De Luca (since 2008), and keyboardist/rhythm guitarist Neil Carter (from 1980 to 1983 and since 2019).

== History ==
=== 1968–1983 ===
The band was formed in 1968 as The Boyfriends by guitarist Mick Bolton, bassist Pete Way and drummer Tick Torrazo. The latter was replaced by Colin Turner and the group was renamed The Ugly. Lead vocalist Phil Mogg joined. In August, Turner was replaced by 17 year-old Andy Parker and the group became known as Hocus Pocus. Two months later the band was renamed UFO. Bolton left on 31 January 1972, shortly after the release of the band's first live album Live. He was briefly replaced by Larry Wallis, who was fired by Mogg and in October 1972 and replaced by Bernie Marsden in November.

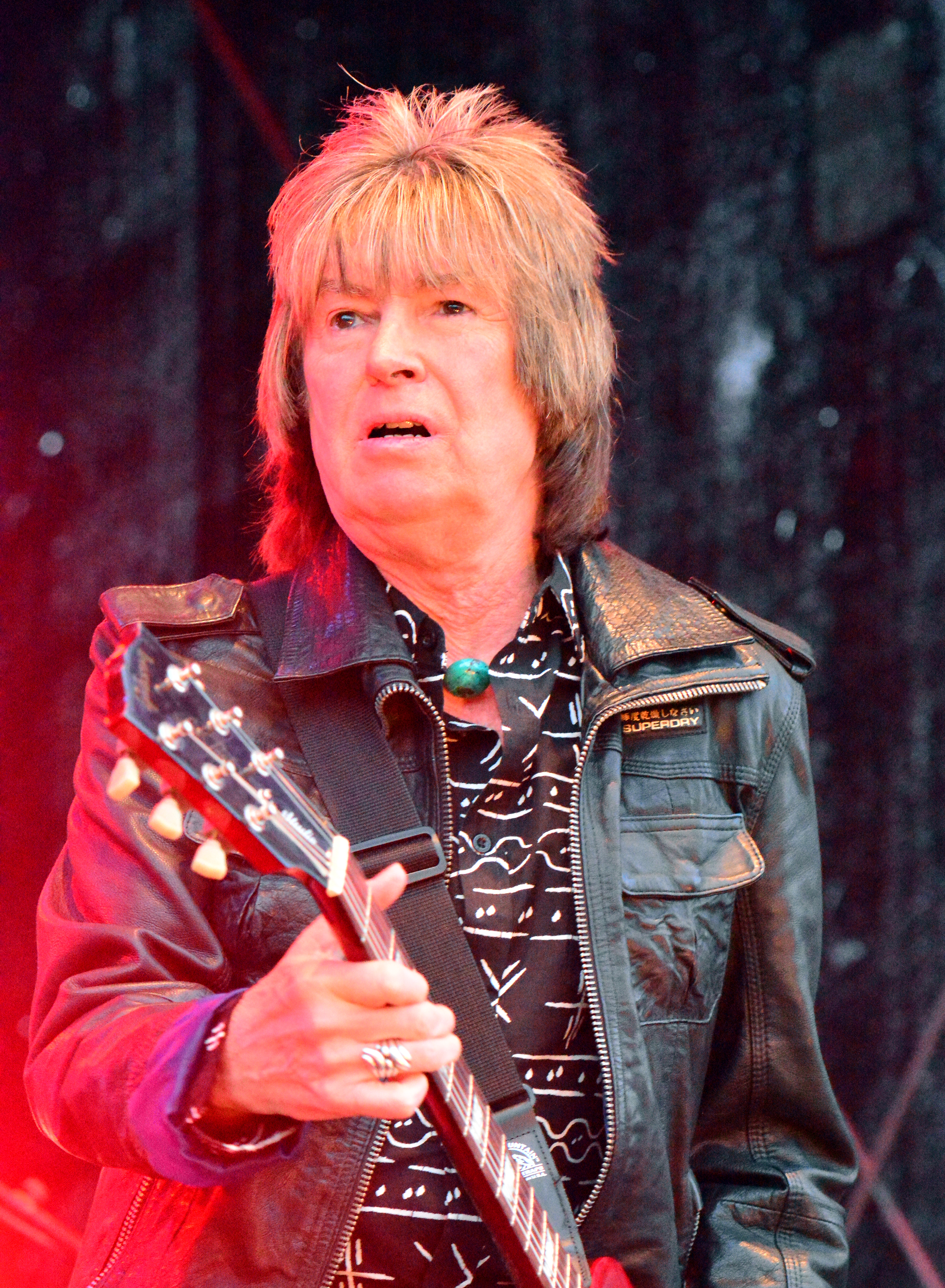
Paul Raymond was a member from 1976 until his death in 2019, over four tenures

On 13 July 1973, Scorpions guitarist Michael Schenker substituted for Marsden on a German tour, and later joined as a full member. Paul Chapman was added as a second guitarist following the release of Phenomenon on 10 May 1974, although he would leave the following 30 December after failing to turn up for a show. Danny Peyronel was added as the band's first keyboardist in August 1975, featuring on their fifth album No Heavy Petting. In August 1976, Peyronel was replaced by Savoy Brown's Paul Raymond, who also contributed rhythm guitar to the band. Due to increased problems stemming from his alcohol abuse, Schenker quit UFO after a show on 29 October 1978, with Chapman returning to take his place shortly after.

Raymond left two years later and was briefly replaced by John Sloman, before Neil Carter took his place midway through the recording of The Wild, the Willing and the Innocent. Way left UFO after the release of 1982's Mechanix, with Chapman and Carter recording bass for Making Contact. Billy Sheehan was brought in to perform on a European tour between January–February 1983, with Paul Gray taking over from late February until the end of the tour on 15 April. Upon the conclusion of the tour, UFO decided to disband.

=== 1984–1998 ===
Mogg reformed UFO in late 1984 with returning bassist Gray, new guitarist "Atomik" Tommy McClendon and new drummer Robbie France. By early 1985, France had been replaced by Jim Simpson and former keyboardist Paul Raymond had returned to the band, with the five-piece releasing Misdemeanor later in the year. Raymond left the band in July 1986 and was replaced by David Jacobson for the rest of the year's touring cycle. McClendon was replaced by Myke Gray in late 1987, and in early 1988 original members Pete Way and Andy Parker returned to the group. A new lineup of the band including guitarist Rik Sanford and drummer Fabio Del Rio began working on a new album later in the year, and after brief stints with Tony Glidewell and Erik Gamans on guitar, UFO broke up for a second time in 1989.

UFO returned for a third time in 1991, with Mogg and Way joined by guitarist Laurence Archer, drummer Clive Edwards and, later, keyboardist Jem Davis. In 1993, Schenker, Parker and Raymond returned to reunite the 'classic' lineup of the band, releasing the album Walk on Water in 1995. Simon Wright replaced Parker in 1995. Schenker left to promote his debut solo album Thank You in 1995, returning in 1997 to support the European release of Walk on Water. The guitarist quit suddenly after a show on April 24, 1998, with Wright and Raymond following soon after; due to an agreement signed by the band members, Mogg and Way were unable to use the name UFO without Schenker, and briefly considered renaming the group Lights Out. However, the pair continued collaborating under the moniker Mogg/Way.

=== 2000–2024 ===
After a two-year hiatus, UFO returned again in 2000 with Schenker returning and Aynsley Dunbar added on drums, releasing Covenant in July. For the album's promotional tour, Luis Maldonado (keyboards, rhythm guitar) and Jeff Martin (drums) were added to the band's lineup. Dunbar returned in 2002 to perform on Sharks, which was the band's last album to feature Schenker who quit in January 2003, relinquishing his part-ownership of the name in order that UFO could continue. In July, it was announced that Vinnie Moore would replace Schenker, Jason Bonham would replace Dunbar, and Paul Raymond would return to the band. Bonham remained in UFO until 2005, when Parker returned to the group, and in 2008 Rob De Luca joined in place of Way, after filling in for him on an initially temporary basis.

On 13 April 2019, Paul Raymond died of a heart attack just a few days after the end of a tour. Two weeks later, it was announced that Neil Carter had rejoined the band to take Raymond's place on tour. In September 2022, it was announced that Phil Mogg had suffered a heart attack and remaining dates of the farewell tour were cancelled, save for occasional shows afterwards. UFO's third disbandment was officially confirmed by Mogg in April 2024.

== Members ==
Image	Name	Years active	Instruments	Release contributions
	Phil Mogg	1968–1983; 1984–1989; 1991–1998; 2000; 2002–2003; 2003–2024	lead vocals	all UFO releases
	Pete Way	1968–1982; 1988–1989; 1991–1998; 2000; 2002–2003; 2003–2008 (died 2020)	bass	all UFO releases from UFO 1 (1970) to Mechanix (1982), and from High Stakes & Dangerous Men (1992) to The Monkey Puzzle (2006), except Heaven's Gate (Live) (1993)
	Mick Bolton	1968–1972	guitar	UFO 1 (1970); UFO 2: Flying (1971); Live (1971)
	Tick Torrazo	1968	drums	none
	Colin Turner	1968–1969	drums	none
	Andy Parker	1969–1983; 1988; 1993–1995; 2005–2024	drums; occasional backing vocals	all UFO releases from UFO 1 (1970) to Making Contact (1983); BBC Radio 1: Live in Concert (1992); Walk on Water (1995); On with the Action (1996); Regenerator: Live 1982 (2001); Live on Earth (2003); all UFO releases from The Monkey Puzzle (2006) onwards, except The Misdemeanor Tour: Live from Oxford (2013)
	Larry Wallis	1972 (died 2019)	guitar	none
	Bernie Marsden	1972–1973 (died 2023)	guitar	Phenomenon (1974) (two 2007 bonus tracks only)
	Michael Schenker	1973–1978; 1993–1995; 1997–1998; 2000; 2002–2003	lead guitar; rhythm guitar (1973–1976, 2000–2002, 2002–2003)	all UFO releases from Phenomenon (1974) to Strangers in the Night (1979); BBC Radio 1: Live in Concert (1992); Walk on Water (1995); On with the Action (1996); Werewolves of London (1998); Covenant (2000); Sharks (2002); Live on Earth (2003)
	Paul Chapman	1974; 1978–1983 (died 2020)	lead guitar; rhythm guitar (1974, 1980); bass (1982–1983)	No Place to Run (1980); The Wild, the Willing and the Innocent (1981); Mechanix (1982); Making Contact (1983); Regenerator: Live 1982 (2001); Headstone: Live at Hammersmith 1983 (2009)
	Danny Peyronel	1975–1976	keyboards; backing vocals	No Heavy Petting (1976)
	Paul Raymond	1976–1980; 1984–1986; 1993–1998; 2003–2019 (until his death)	keyboards; rhythm guitar; lead guitar (1995–1997); backing vocals	all UFO releases from Lights Out (1977) to No Place to Run (1980); Misdemeanor (1985); BBC Radio 1: Live in Concert (1992); Walk on Water (1995); Werewolves of London (1998); Live USA (2000); all UFO releases from Live on Earth (2003) onwards, except Headstone: Live at Hammersmith 1983 (2009)
	Neil Carter	1980–1983; 2019–2024	keyboards; rhythm guitar; saxophone (1981); bass (1982–1983); backing vocals	The Wild, the Willing and the Innocent (1981) (Note: Saxophone on track "Lonely Heart" only); Mechanix (1982); Making Contact (1983); Regenerator: Live 1982 (2001); Headstone: Live at Hammersmith 1983 (2009)
	Paul Gray	1983; 1984–1988	bass	Misdemeanor (1985); Ain't Misbehavin' (1988); Heaven's Gate (Live) (1993); Headstone: Live at Hammersmith 1983 (2009); The Misdemeanor Tour: Live from Oxford (2013)
	Atomik Tommy M	1984–1987	lead guitar; rhythm guitar (1984, 1986–1987); backing vocals	Misdemeanor (1985); Ain't Misbehavin' (1988); Heaven's Gate (Live) (1993); The Misdemeanor Tour: Live from Oxford (2013)
	Robbie France	1984–1985 (died 2012)	drums	none
	Jim Simpson	1985–1988	drums; backing vocals	Misdemeanor (1985); Ain't Misbehavin' (1988); Heaven's Gate (Live) (1993); The Misdemeanor Tour: Live from Oxford (2013)
	Myke Gray	1987–1988	guitar	none
	Fabio Del Rio	1988–1989	drums	none
	Rik Sandford	1988	guitar	none
	Tony Glidewell	1988	guitar	none
	Erik Gamans	1989	guitar	none
	Laurence Archer	1991–1993	guitar; backing vocals	High Stakes & Dangerous Men (1992); Lights Out in Tokyo: Live (1992)
	Clive Edwards	1991–1993	drums	High Stakes & Dangerous Men (1992); Lights Out in Tokyo: Live (1992)
	Jem Davis	1991–1993	keyboards	Lights Out in Tokyo: Live (1992)
	Simon Wright	1995–1996; 1997–1998	drums	Werewolves of London (1998); Live USA (2000)
	Aynsley Dunbar	2000; 2002–2003	drums	Covenant (2000); Sharks (2002)
	Vinnie Moore	2003–2024	lead guitar	all UFO releases from You Are Here (2004) onwards, except Headstone: Live at Hammersmith 1983 (2009) and The Misdemeanor Tour: Live from Oxford (2013)
	Jason Bonham	2003–2005	drums; backing vocals	You Are Here (2004); Showtime (2005)
	Rob De Luca	2008–2024	bass; backing vocals	A Conspiracy of Stars (2015); The Salentino Cuts (2017)

=== Touring ===
Image	Name	Years active	Instruments	Notes
	Billy Sheehan	1983	bass	Sheehan performed with UFO on a European tour between January–February 1983 after the departure of Pete Way.
	David Jacobson	1986	keyboards; backing vocals	Jacobson toured with UFO in 1986 after the departure of Paul Raymond earlier in the year.
	Luis Maldonado	2000	keyboards; rhythm and lead guitars; backing vocals	Maldonaldo and Martin were added to UFO's touring lineup following the release of Covenant in 2000. Luis contributed backing vocals to Covenant (2000) and Sharks (2002)
	Jeff Martin	2000	drums; backing vocals	Maldonaldo and Martin were added to UFO's touring lineup following the release of Covenant in 2000. Luis contributed backing vocals to Covenant (2000) and Sharks (2002)
	Barry Sparks	2004	bass	Sparks performed with UFO on a United States tour between September—October 2004.
	Jeff Kollman	2005	bass	Kollman substituted for regular bassist Pete Way in UFO on a United States tour in July 2005.

=== Session ===
Image	Name	Years active	Instruments	Release contributions
	Chick Churchill	1975	keyboards	Force It (1975)
	John Sloman	1980	keyboards	The Wild, the Willing and the Innocent (1981)
	Paul Buckmaster	1980 (died 2017)	orchestral arrangements; orchestra conductor	The Wild, the Willing and the Innocent (1981)
	Don Airey	1991	keyboards	High Stakes & Dangerous Men (1992)
	Terry Reid	1991 (died 2025)	backing vocals	High Stakes & Dangerous Men (1992)
	Stevie Lange	1991	backing vocals	High Stakes & Dangerous Men (1992)
	Mark Philips	1995	backing vocals	Walk on Water (1995)
	Jesse Bradman	2000; 2002	backing vocals	Covenant (2000); Sharks (2002)
	Kevin Carlson	2000; 2002	keyboards	Covenant (2000); Sharks (2002)
	Mike Varney	2002	guitar fills & outro guitar solo	Sharks (2002)
	Peter Pichl	2009	bass	The Visitor (2009)
	Martina Frank	2009	backing vocals	The Visitor (2009)
	Melanie Newton	2009	backing vocals	The Visitor (2009)
	Olaf Senkbeil	2009	backing vocals	The Visitor (2009)
	Alexa Wild	2011	backing vocals	Seven Deadly (2012)
	Marino Carlini	2011	backing vocals	Seven Deadly (2012)
	Lars Lehmann	2011	bass	Seven Deadly (2012)
	Marc Hothan	2011	harp	Seven Deadly (2012)

== Timeline ==
=== Recording Timeline ===
Role	Lead vocals	Lead guitar	Rhythm guitar	Keyboards	Bass guitar	Drums	Backing vocals
UFO 1 (1970)	Phil Mogg	Mick Bolton	Mick Bolton	none	Pete Way	Andy Parker	none
UFO 2: Flying (1971)	Phil Mogg	Mick Bolton	Mick Bolton	none	Pete Way	Andy Parker	none
Phenomenon (1974)	Phil Mogg	Michael Schenker	Michael Schenker	none	Pete Way	Andy Parker	Phil Mogg
Force It (1975)	Phil Mogg	Michael Schenker	Michael Schenker	Chick Churchill(guest)	Pete Way	Andy Parker	Phil Mogg
No Heavy Petting (1976)	Phil Mogg	Michael Schenker	Michael Schenker	Danny Peyronel	Pete Way	Andy Parker	Danny Peyronel
Lights Out (1977)	Phil Mogg	Michael Schenker	Paul Raymond	Paul Raymond	Pete Way	Andy Parker	Paul Raymond
Obsession (1978)	Phil Mogg	Michael Schenker	Paul Raymond	Paul Raymond	Pete Way	Andy Parker	Paul Raymond
No Place to Run (1980)	Phil Mogg	Paul Chapman	Paul Raymond	Paul Raymond	Pete Way	Andy Parker	Paul Raymond
The Wild, the Willing and the Innocent (1981)	Phil Mogg	Paul Chapman	Paul Chapman	John Sloman (guest)	Pete Way	Andy Parker	none
Mechanix (1982)	Phil Mogg	Paul Chapman	Neil Carter	Neil Carter	Pete Way	Andy Parker	Neil Carter
Making Contact (1983)	Phil Mogg	Paul Chapman	Neil Carter	Neil Carter	Paul Champan/ Neil Carter/Paul Gray (bonus tracks only)	Andy Parker	Neil Carter
Misdemeanor (1985)	Phil Mogg	Atomik Tommy M	Paul Raymond	Paul Raymond	Paul Gray	Jim Simpson	Atomik Tommy M, Jim Simpson
High Stakes & Dangerous Men (1992)	Phil Mogg	Laurence Archer	Laurence Archer	Don Airey (session)	Pete Way	Clive Edwards	Laurence Archer, Terry Reid, Stevie Lange
Walk on Water (1995)	Phil Mogg	Michael Schenker	Paul Raymond	Paul Raymond	Pete Way	Andy Parker	Mark Phillips
Covenant (2000)	Phil Mogg	Michael Schenker	Michael Schenker	Kevin Carlson (session)	Pete Way	Aynsley Dunbar	Jesse Bredman, Luis Maldonado
Sharks (2002)	Phil Mogg	Michael Schenker	Michael Schenker	Kevin Carlson (session)	Pete Way	Aynsley Dunbar	Jesse Bredman, Luis Maldonado
You Are Here (2004)	Phil Mogg	Vinnie Moore	Vinnie Moore	Paul Raymond	Pete Way	Jason Bonham	Paul Raymond, Jason Bonham
The Monkey Puzzle (2006)	Phil Mogg	Vinnie Moore	Vinnie Moore	Paul Raymond	Pete Way	Andy Parker	Paul Raymond
The Visitor (2009)	Phil Mogg	Vinnie Moore	Paul Raymond	Paul Raymond	Peter Pichl (session)	Andy Parker	Paul Raymond
Seven Deadly (2012)	Phil Mogg	Vinnie Moore	Paul Raymond	Paul Raymond	Lars Lehmann (session)	Andy Parker	Paul Raymond
A Conspiracy of Stars (2015)	Phil Mogg	Vinnie Moore	Vinnie Moore	Paul Raymond	Rob De Luca	Andy Parker	Paul Raymond
The Salentino Cuts (2017)	Phil Mogg	Vinnie Moore	Vinnie Moore	Paul Raymond	Rob De Luca	Andy Parker	Paul Raymond

== Lineups ==
Period	Members	Releases
1968 (as The Boyfriends)	Pete Way – bass; Mick Bolton – guitars; Tick Torrazo – drums	none
1968 – August 1969 (as Hocus Pocus)	Pete Way – bass; Mick Bolton – guitars; Phil Mogg – vocals; Colin Turner – drums	none
August 1969 – January 1972 (as The Ugly until October 1969)	Pete Way – bass; Mick Bolton – guitars; Phil Mogg – vocals; Andy Parker – drums	UFO 1 (1970); UFO 2: Flying (1971); Live (1971)
February – October 1972	Pete Way – bass; Phil Mogg – vocals; Andy Parker – drums; Larry Wallis – guitars	Live Sightings (2015); Early Flight 1972 (2024)
November 1972 – July 1973	Pete Way – bass; Phil Mogg – vocals; Andy Parker – drums; Bernie Marsden – guitars	Phenomenon (bonus tracks on 2007 reissue); Live in Germany 1973 (except tracks 9–12)
July 1973 – May 1974	Pete Way – bass; Phil Mogg – vocals; Andy Parker – drums; Michael Schenker – guitars	Phenomenon (1974)
May – December 1974	Pete Way – bass; Phil Mogg – vocals; Andy Parker – drums; Michael Schenker – lead guitar; Paul Chapman – rhythm guitar	Live at the Marquee 1974
January – July 1975	Pete Way – bass; Phil Mogg – vocals; Andy Parker – drums; Michael Schenker – guitars	Force It (1975)
August 1975 – July 1976	Pete Way – bass; Phil Mogg – lead vocals; Andy Parker – drums; Michael Schenker – guitars; Danny Peyronel – keyboards, backing vocals	No Heavy Petting (1976); On with the Action (1996)
August 1976 – October 1978	Pete Way – bass; Phil Mogg – lead vocals; Andy Parker – drums; Michael Schenker – lead guitar; Paul Raymond – keyboards, rhythm guitar, backing vocals	Lights Out (1977); Obsession (1978); Strangers in the Night (1979)
October 1978 – May 1980	Pete Way – bass; Phil Mogg – lead vocals; Andy Parker – drums; Paul Raymond – keyboards, rhythm guitar, backing vocals; Paul Chapman – lead guitar	No Place to Run (1980)
Summer 1980	Pete Way – bass; Phil Mogg – vocals; Andy Parker – drums; Paul Chapman – guitars; John Sloman – keyboards (session)	The Wild, the Willing and the Innocent (1981) (Sloman is uncredited on the album)
August 1980 – June 1982	Pete Way – bass; Phil Mogg – lead vocals; Andy Parker – drums; Paul Chapman – lead guitar; Neil Carter – keyboards, rhythm guitar, backing vocals	The Wild, the Willing and the Innocent (1981); Mechanix (1982); Regenerator – Live 1982 (2001)
August – November 1982	Phil Mogg – lead vocals; Andy Parker – drums; Paul Chapman – lead guitar, bass; Neil Carter – keyboards, rhythm guitar, bass, backing vocals	Making Contact (1983)
January – February 1983	Phil Mogg – lead vocals; Andy Parker – drums; Paul Chapman – lead guitar, bass (studio); Neil Carter – keyboards, rhythm guitar, bass (studio), backing vocals; Billy Sheehan – bass (touring)	none
February – April 1983	Phil Mogg – lead vocals; Andy Parker – drums; Paul Chapman – lead guitar, bass (studio); Neil Carter – keyboards, rhythm guitar, bass (studio), backing vocals; Paul Gray – bass (touring)	Making Contact (1983) (2009 reissue bonus tracks)
Band inactive April 1983 – October 1984
October – November 1984	Phil Mogg – lead vocals; Paul Gray – bass; Robbie France – drums; Atomik Tommy M – guitars, backing vocals; Barbara Schenker — keyboards	none
November 1984 – February 1985	Phil Mogg – lead vocals; Paul Gray – bass; Robbie France – drums; Atomik Tommy M – lead guitar, backing vocals; Paul Raymond – keyboards, rhythm guitar, backing vocals	
April 1985 – July 1986	Phil Mogg – lead vocals; Paul Gray – bass; Atomik Tommy M – lead guitar, backing vocals; Paul Raymond – keyboards, rhythm guitar, backing vocals; Jim Simpson – drums, backing vocals	Misdemeanor (1985); Misdemeanor Tour (1986); Heaven's Gate (1993)
July – August 1986	Phil Mogg – lead vocals; Paul Gray – bass; Atomik Tommy M – guitars, backing vocals; Jim Simpson – drums, backing vocals; David Jacobson – keyboards (touring)	none
September 1986 – December 1987	Phil Mogg – lead vocals; Paul Gray – bass; Atomik Tommy M – guitars, backing vocals; Jim Simpson – drums, backing vocals	Ain't Misbehavin' (1988)
December 1987 – March 1988	Phil Mogg – lead vocals; Paul Gray – bass; Jim Simpson – drums, backing vocals; Myke Gray – guitars	none
May — June 1988	Phil Mogg – vocals; Myke Gray – guitars; Pete Way – bass; Andy Parker – drums	none
July — October 1988	Phil Mogg – vocals; Pete Way – bass; Fabio Del Rio – drums; Rik Sandford – guitars	none
October — December 1988	Phil Mogg – vocals; Pete Way – bass; Fabio Del Rio – drums; Tony Glidewell – guitars	none
January — April 1989	Phil Mogg – vocals; Pete Way – bass; Fabio Del Rio – drums; Erik Gamans – guitars	none
Band inactive April 1989 – 1991
1991	Phil Mogg – lead vocals; Pete Way – bass; Laurence Archer – guitars, backing vocals; Clive Edwards – drums	High Stakes & Dangerous Men (1992)
1992 – June 1993	Phil Mogg – lead vocals; Pete Way – bass; Laurence Archer – guitars, backing vocals; Clive Edwards – drums; Jem Davis – keyboards	Lights Out in Tokyo: Live (1992)
June 1993 – October 1995	Phil Mogg – lead vocals; Pete Way – bass; Andy Parker – drums; Paul Raymond – keyboards, rhythm guitar, backing vocals; Michael Schenker – lead guitar	Walk on Water (1995)
November 1995 – June 1997	Phil Mogg – lead vocals; Pete Way – bass; Paul Raymond – guitars, keyboards, backing vocals; Simon Wright – drums	none
June 1997 – April 1998	Phil Mogg – lead vocals; Pete Way – bass; Paul Raymond – keyboards, rhythm guitar, backing vocals; Simon Wright – drums; Michael Schenker – lead guitar	Werewolves of London (1998); Live USA (2000); Live on Earth (2003)
Band inactive April 1998 – January 2000
January — September 2000	Phil Mogg – vocals; Pete Way – bass; Michael Schenker – guitars; Aynsley Dunbar – drums	Covenant (2000)
October — December 2000	Phil Mogg – lead vocals; Pete Way – bass; Michael Schenker – lead guitar; Jeff Martin – drums, backing vocals (touring); Luis Maldonado – keyboards, rhythm guitar, backing vocals (touring)	none
Band inactive December 2000 – January 2002
January 2002 – January 2003	Phil Mogg – vocals; Pete Way – bass; Michael Schenker – guitars; Aynsley Dunbar – drums	Sharks (2002)
Band inactive January – July 2003
July 2003 – September 2005	Phil Mogg – lead vocals; Pete Way – bass; Paul Raymond – keyboards, rhythm guitar, backing vocals; Vinnie Moore – lead guitar; Jason Bonham – drums, backing vocals	You Are Here (2004)
September 2005 – March 2008	Phil Mogg – lead vocals; Pete Way – bass; Paul Raymond – keyboards, rhythm guitar, backing vocals; Vinnie Moore – lead guitar; Andy Parker – drums	The Monkey Puzzle (2006)
March 2008 – April 2019	Phil Mogg – lead vocals; Paul Raymond – keyboards, rhythm guitar, backing vocals; Vinnie Moore – lead guitar; Andy Parker – drums; Rob De Luca – bass, backing vocals	The Visitor (2009) (Note: De Luca was a touring bassist in the band at this time, though he did not play on the album.); Seven Deadly (2012); A Conspiracy of Stars (2015); The Salentino Cuts (2017)
April 2019 – April 2024	Phil Mogg – lead vocals; Vinnie Moore – lead guitar; Andy Parker – drums; Rob De Luca – bass, backing vocals; Neil Carter – keyboards, rhythm guitar, backing vocals	none

== Bibliography ==
- Daniels, Neil (15 November 2013), High Stakes & Dangerous Men: The UFO Story, London, England: Soundcheck Books, ISBN 978-0957144262
