= Collection: The Shrapnel Years (Vinnie Moore album) =

Greatest hits album by Vinnie Moore
- Released: March 14, 2006
- Recorded: 1986–2001 at various locations
- Genre: Instrumental rock, neoclassical metal
- Length: 65:06
- Label: Shrapnel
- Producer: Vinnie Moore, Steve Fontano, Mike Varney

Vinnie Moore chronology
Defying Gravity (2001)	Collection: The Shrapnel Years (2006)	To the Core (2009)

Professional ratings
Review scores
Source	Rating
AllMusic	3.5/5 stars

Collection: The Shrapnel Years is a compilation album by guitarist Vinnie Moore, released on March 14, 2006, through Shrapnel Records.

== Track listing ==
All tracks are written by Vinnie Moore.

No.	Title	Original album	Length
1.	"In Control"	Mind's Eye	4:39
2.	"Daydream"	Mind's Eye	4:31
3.	"Lifeforce"	Mind's Eye	4:04
4.	"Hero Without Honor"	Mind's Eye	7:21
5.	"The Maze"	The Maze	8:43
6.	"Cryptic Dreams"	The Maze	5:33
7.	"Defying Gravity"	Defying Gravity	5:06
8.	"Last Road Home"	Defying Gravity	4:27
9.	"Alexander the Great"	Defying Gravity	5:06
10.	"Out and Beyond"	Defying Gravity	6:45
11.	"Meltdown" (live)	Live!	3:36
12.	"Check It Out!" (live)	Live!	5:15
Total length:			65:06

== Personnel ==
- Vinnie Moore – guitar, mixing, production
- Wayne Findlay – guitar (tracks 11–12), keyboard (tracks 11, 12)
- Tony MacAlpine – keyboard (tracks 1–6)
- David Rosenthal – keyboard (tracks 7–10)
- Tommy Aldridge – drums (tracks 1–4)
- Shane Gaalaas – drums (tracks 5, 6, 11, 12), percussion (tracks 5, 6, 11, 12)
- Steve Smith – drums (tracks 7–10)
- Andy West – bass (tracks 1–4)
- Dave LaRue – bass (tracks 5–10)
- Barry Sparks – bass (tracks 11, 12)
- Steve Fontano – engineering, production
- Dino Alden – engineering
- Mark Rennick – engineering
- Noah Landis – engineering
- James Murphy – engineering
- Gustavo Venegas – engineering
- Robert M. Biles – engineering
- Mat Diamond – engineering
- Phil Edwards – engineering
- Paul Orofino – mixing, mastering
- R.B. Hunter – mixing
- George Horn – mastering
- Christopher Ash – mastering
- Tim Gennert – remastering
- Mike Varney – production, executive production
