= Spread Eagle (band) =

American hard rock band

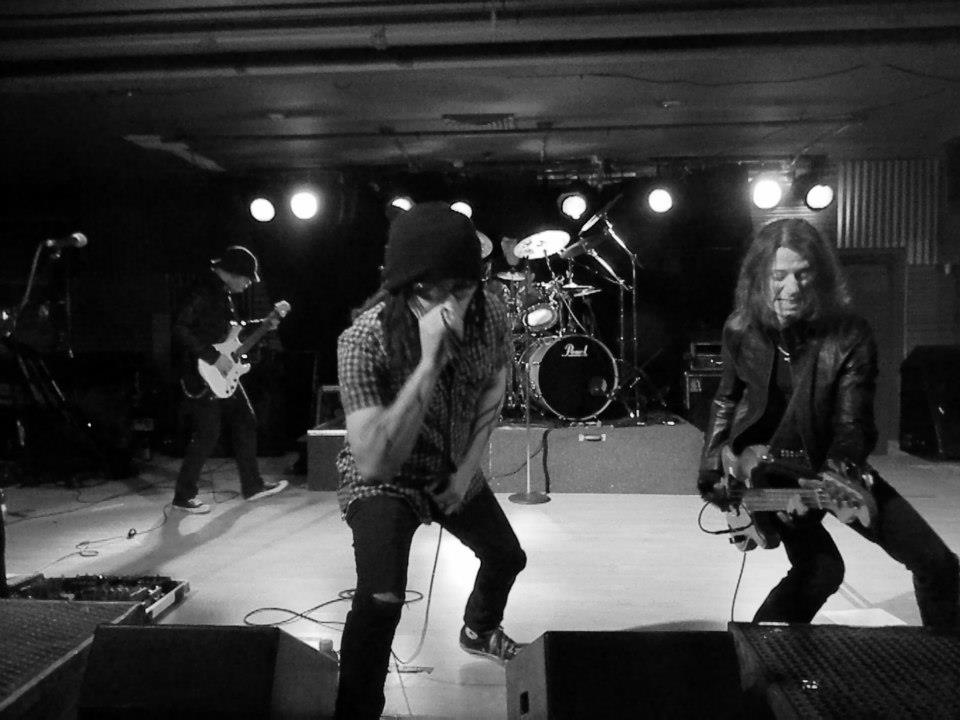
- Spread Eagle Live February 2013 at The House of Rock in Baltimore

Background information
- Origin: New York City, U.S.
- Genres: Hard rock, glam metal
- Years active: 1989–1995, 2006–present
- Labels: Frontiers, MCA/Universal, Lovember
- Members: Ray West; Rob De Luca; Rik De Luca; Jommy Puledda
- Past members: Paul DiBartolo; Tommi Gallo; Dennis Kimack; Ziv Shalev

Spread Eagle is an American hard rock band from New York City, formed in 1989. After only a few months of formation, they were signed by MCA/Universal Records. They have released four albums: Spread Eagle (1990), Open to the Public (1993) Subway to the Stars (2019) and The Brutal Divine (2026).

== History ==
=== Early years ===
In the 1980s, founding members Paul DiBartolo, Rob De Luca and Tommi Gallo were playing in the Boston-based hard rock band Bang. In September 1986, Bang won the MTV Basement Tapes competition with the video for their song "Summertime".

In 1989, guitarist Paul Di Bartolo (a.k.a. Salvadore Poe) traveled to New York City where he met singer Ray West. Paul was so impressed by his voice that he immediately convinced bassist Rob De Luca and drummer Tommi Gallo to follow him to New York and start a new band with Ray, which became Spread Eagle.

After only a few months of rehearsing, they signed with MCA/Universal Records.

=== Spread Eagle ===
As they were signed while still rehearsing for their first gig, they wrote most songs for their 1990 debut album Spread Eagle in the recording studio. Receiving little promotion from MCA, the band produced the video for "Scratch Like a Cat" using their own money and with the help of friends.

=== Open to the Public ===
The band spent a lot of time on the road before recording their follow-up album and began burning out. First to leave was drummer Tommi Gallo. He was replaced by Kirke Blankenship who did not stay for long and played drums on one track ("High Horses") of the second album Open to the Public. That album was then recorded with session drummers John Macaluso of TNT and Thommy Price of Joan Jett and the Blackhearts. Open to the Public was released in 1993. Dave Femia played the drums on the following tour. Gallo then returned but quit after a US tour. The new record did not meet the expectations of their fans and grunge took over the music scene, so Spread Eagle resigned and split up in 1995.

=== Post Spread Eagle ===
Ray West turned his back on the music business for a while. He is also singing in a band called Weapons of Anew.

Paul DiBartolo changed his name to Salvadore Poe and wrote/recorded songs for Swedish singer Lisa Ekdahl who was his wife at that time. He is fascinated by Indian culture and spends much of his time there.

Rob De Luca started new bands called Ouijipig and Of Earth. He has also worked as a studio bassist and touring bassist for many bands including UFO, Sebastian Bach, Joan Jett and the Blackhearts, Helmet, George Lynch and Vinnie Moore.

Tommi Gallo is a member of the band Iron Rage and formerly of Bang. He is an artist who designed the Spread Eagle debut album cover. He lives, plays and paints in Worcester, Massachusetts.

=== 2006 reunion ===
In 2006, Spread Eagle's debut album Spread Eagle, which had been out of print for 10 years, was remastered and re-released by the independent label Lovember Records. At the same time, Rob De Luca and Ray West reformed the band, announcing the 2006 "Back on the Bitch Tour" of the northeastern USA.

When guitarist Ziv Shalev joined in 2012, the band finally had a stable lineup, along with drummer Rik De Luca, who joined in 2010 and the two founding members Ray West (vocals) and Rob De Luca (bass, vocals).

=== Recent ===
In 2017, Spread Eagle confirmed several tour dates in Europe, including the Hull Metal Heaven and HRH Sleaze festivals. Following their UK/EU 2017 tour, they signed to Frontiers Music SRL and started writing and recording. Their latest album Subway to the Stars was released on August 9, 2019. The music video for the first single "Sound of Speed" features the band members in a go-kart race with an unexpected ending. It was filmed in the Poconos in Pennsylvania and directed by Phil Allocco (The Truth About Lies).

Australian drag racing team West Coast Pro Modifieds chose "Sound of Speed" as their official song for the 2019/2020 racing season. The Australian Spread Eagle fan club honored this by creating a "Pro Mod Edit" of the video, where the go-kart race sequences were replaced with real drag racing footages. Subway to the Stars was included in many best of 2019 polls, including the Top 5 hard rock releases on Ultimate Guitar and Top 20 albums of 2019 in both the Sleaze Roxx readers' voting and The Rock Pit Australia. In July 2020, Spread Eagle released a lyric video for the track "More Wolf Than Lamb".

== Band members ==
=== Current ===
- Ray West – lead vocals, tambourine (1989–1995, 2006–present)
- Rob De Luca – bass, vocals (1989–1995, 2006–present)
- Rik De Luca – drums (2010–present)
- Jommy Puledda – guitar (2022–present)

=== Former ===
- Paul DiBartolo (Salvadore Poe) – guitar, vocals (1989–1995)
- Tommi Gallo – drums (1989–1992, 1993–1994)
- Dennis Kimak – guitar (2008–2012)
- Ziv Shalev – guitar (2012–2022)

=== Session ===
- Kirke Blankenship – drums (1992)
- John Macaluso – drums (1992–1993)
- Thommy Price – drums (1992–1993)

=== Tour members ===
- Dave Femia – drums (1993)
- John Macaluso – drums (2006)
- Chris Caffery – guitar (2006)
- Gerry White – drums (2008)
- Gianmaria "Jommy" Puledda – guitar (2022)

== Discography ==
Year	Title	Label
1990	Spread Eagle	MCA/Universal Records
1993	Open to the Public	MCA/Universal Records
2019	Subway to the Stars	Frontiers SRL Records
2026	The Brutal Divine	Frontiers SRL Records
