= Aerial Visions =

Studio album by Vinnie Moore
- Released: October 23, 2015
- Recorded: 2013–15
- Studio: Shorefire Recording Studio in Long Branch, New Jersey; The Core in Northern California
- Genre: Instrumental rock
- Length: 47:49
- Label: Mind's Eye

Vinnie Moore chronology
To the Core (2009)	Aerial Visions (2015)	Soul Shifter (2019)

Aerial Visions is the eighth studio album by guitarist Vinnie Moore, released on October 23, 2015 independently through Mind's Eye Music.

== Track listing ==
No.	Title	Length
1.	"Mustang Shuffle"	4:14
2.	"Now's the Time"	4:11
3.	"Faith"	4:22
4.	"Slam"	4:37
5.	"La Grange" (ZZ Top cover)	4:04
6.	"Looking Back"	4:30
7.	"Aerial Vision"	4:39
8.	"The Dark Dream"	5:41
9.	"Calling Out"	4:38
10.	"A Million Miles Gone"	6:53
Total length:		47:49

== Personnel ==
- Vinnie Moore – guitar, bass
- Tim Lehner – keyboard
- Richie Monica – drums
- Dave LaRue – bass
- Rob De Luca – bass
- Dorian Heartsong – bass
- Elliott Dean Rubinson – bass
- Joey DeMaio – engineering
- Paul Northfield – mixing
- Paul Logus – mastering
