= Time Odyssey (album) =

Studio album by Vinnie Moore
- Released: 1988
- Recorded: February 1988 at Kajem and Victory Studios in Gladwyne, Pennsylvania
- Genre: Instrumental rock, neoclassical metal
- Length: 60:37
- Label: PolyGram
- Producer: Vinnie Moore

Vinnie Moore chronology
Mind's Eye (1986)	Time Odyssey (1988)	Meltdown (1991)

Professional ratings
Review scores
Source	Rating
AllMusic	3.5/5 stars

Time Odyssey is the second studio album by guitarist Vinnie Moore, released in 1988 through PolyGram. As of 2013 it is Moore's only release to enter the Billboard 200 chart, where it peaked at #147.

== Track listing ==
No.	Title	Writer(s)	Length
1.	"Morning Star"	Vinnie Moore	3:24
2.	"Prelude/Into the Future"	Moore, Jordan Rudess	4:23
3.	"Beyond the Door"	Moore	5:29
4.	"Message in a Dream"	Moore, Rudess	9:10
5.	"As Time Slips By"	Moore	6:43
6.	"Race with Destiny"	Moore	6:36
7.	"While My Guitar Gently Weeps"	George Harrison	4:40
8.	"The Tempest"	Moore	8:48
9.	"Pieces of a Picture"	Moore	6:14
10.	"April Sky"	Johann Sebastian Bach	5:10
Total length:			60:37

== Personnel ==
- Vinnie Moore – guitar, production
- Jordan Rudess – keyboard
- Joe Franco – drums
- Michael Bean – bass
- Joe Alexander – engineering
- Brooke Hendricks – engineering
- Bob Ludwig – mastering

== Chart performance ==
Year	Chart	Peak	Peak reached	Weeks on chart
1988	Billboard 200	147	June 25, 1988	7
