= Defying Gravity (Vinnie Moore album) =

Studio album by Vinnie Moore
- Released: July 10, 2001
- Recorded: VinMan Studios; Neverland Studios in Marin County, California
- Genre: Instrumental rock, neoclassical metal
- Length: 56:30
- Label: Shrapnel
- Producer: Vinnie Moore

Vinnie Moore chronology
Live! (2000)	Defying Gravity (2001)	Collection: The Shrapnel Years (2006)

Professional ratings
Review scores
Source	Rating
AllMusic	4/5 stars

Defying Gravity is the sixth studio album by guitarist Vinnie Moore, released on July 10, 2001 through Shrapnel Records.

== Track listing ==
All tracks are written by Vinnie Moore.

No.	Title	Length
1.	"Defying Gravity"	5:07
2.	"Out and Beyond"	6:47
3.	"Last Road Home"	4:28
4.	"Alexander the Great"	5:07
5.	"The Voice Within"	2:10
6.	"If I Could"	4:52
7.	"House with a Thousand Rooms"	5:26
8.	"Awaken the Madman"	6:25
9.	"In the Blink of an Eye"	5:32
10.	"Equinox"	3:52
11.	"Emotion Overload"	5:08
12.	"Between Then and Now"	1:36
Total length:		56:30

== Personnel ==
- Vinnie Moore – guitar, mixing, production
- David Rosenthal – keyboard
- Steve Smith – drums
- Dave LaRue – bass
- Robert M. Biles – engineering
- Paul Orofino – mixing
- R.B. Hunter – mixing
- Christopher Ash – mastering
