= A Conspiracy of Stars =

Studio album by UFO
- Released: 23 February 2015
- Recorded: Ecology Room Studios, Kent; The Core, USA
- Genres: Hard rock, heavy metal
- Label: SPV/Steamhammer
- Producer: Chris Tsangarides

UFO chronology
Seven Deadly (2012)	A Conspiracy of Stars (2015)	The Salentino Cuts (2017)

A Conspiracy of Stars is the 21st studio album by British hard rock band UFO, released on 23 February 2015. This would be the last full-length studio album of original material released by the band before their third breakup in 2024, as their following album, The Salentino Cuts, consisted solely of cover songs.

== Track listing ==
No.	Title	Writer(s)	Length
1.	"The Killing Kind"	Rob De Luca, Phil Mogg	3:58
2.	"Run Boy Run"	Vinnie Moore, Mogg	4:16
3.	"Ballad of the Left Hand Gun"	Moore, Mogg	4:27
4.	"Sugar Cane"	Moore, Mogg	6:08
5.	"Devil's in the Detail"	Moore, Mogg	5:09
6.	"Precious Cargo"	Moore, Mogg	5:49
7.	"The Real Deal"	Paul Raymond, Mogg	4:04
8.	"One and Only"	De Luca, Mogg	3:55
9.	"Messiah of Love"	Moore, Mogg	4:32
10.	"Rollin' Rollin'"	Moore, Mogg	5:16

Limited edition bonus track
No.	Title	Writer(s)	Length
11.	"King of the Hill"	Raymond, De Luca, Mogg	2:40

== Personnel ==
Band members

- Phil Mogg – vocals
- Vinnie Moore – all guitars
- Paul Raymond – keyboards, backing vocals
- Andy Parker – drums
- Rob De Luca – bass

Additional personnel

- Chris Tsangarides – production, recording and mixing
- Helge Engelke – mastering
- Tristan Greatrex – album artwork

== Charts ==
Chart (2015)	Peak position
German Albums (Offizielle Top 100)	28
Scottish Albums (Official Charts)	47
Swiss Albums (Schweizer Hitparade)	72
UK Albums (Official Charts)	50
UK Independent Albums (Official Charts)	8
UK Rock & Metal Albums (Official Charts)	6
