= The Salentino Cuts =

Studio album of cover songs by UFO
- Released: 29 September 2017
- Genre: Hard rock; heavy metal
- Length: 46:54
- Label: Cleopatra Records
- Producer: Mirko Hofmann

UFO chronology
| A Conspiracy of Stars (2015) | The Salentino Cuts (2017) |

The Salentino Cuts is the 22nd and final studio album (and only covers album) by British rock band UFO. The album was released on Cleopatra Records on 29 September 2017. It was the final studio release by the band prior to the 2019 death of keyboardist/guitarist Paul Raymond. In reference to the album title, bassist Rob De Luca stated "We recorded the album in Hanover, Germany. We would often end up at an Italian restaurant afterward to eat, drink, hang and plan out the next day. The restaurant is called Salentino's. So it became our de facto clubhouse."

UFO covers songs from the Yardbirds, the Doors, Mad Season, Steppenwolf, John Mellencamp, Montrose, Mountain, Bill Withers, Tom Petty, Robin Trower, ZZ Top and the Animals.

== Track listing ==
| No. | Title | Writer(s) | Original Artist | Length |
|---|---|---|---|---|
| 1. | "Heartful of Soul" | Graham Gouldman | The Yardbirds | 3:09 |
| 2. | "Break On Through" | John Densmore, Robby Krieger, Ray Manzarek, Jim Morrison | The Doors | 2:21 |
| 3. | "River of Deceit" | Barrett Martin, Mike McCready, John Saunders, Layne Staley | Mad Season | 5:06 |
| 4. | "The Pusher" | Hoyt Axton, John Kay | Steppenwolf | 4:55 |
| 5. | "Paper in Fire" | John Mellencamp | John Mellencamp | 4:02 |
| 6. | "Rock Candy" | Denny Carmassi, Bill Church, Sammy Hagar, Ronnie Montrose | Montrose | 5:14 |
| 7. | "Mississippi Queen" | Corky Laing, Felix Pappalardi, David Rea, Leslie West | Mountain | 2:42 |
| 8. | "Ain't No Sunshine" | Bill Withers | Bill Withers | 3:12 |
| 9. | "Honey-Bee" | Tom Petty | Tom Petty | 3:58 |
| 10. | "Too Rolling Stoned" | Robin Trower | Robin Trower | 5:14 |
| 11. | "Just Got Paid" | Billy Gibbons, Bill Ham | ZZ Top | 3:24 |
| 12. | "It's My Life" | Roger Atkins, Carl Derrico | The Animals | 3:32 |

== Personnel ==
Band members

- Phil Mogg – lead vocals
- Vinnie Moore – guitars
- Paul Raymond – keyboards, backing vocals
- Andy Parker – drums
- Rob De Luca – bass

== Reviews ==
- Music review: UFO – "The Salentino Cuts", Herald – Standard
- UFO – Salentino Cuts (Album Review) – Cryptic Rock

== Charts ==
| Chart (2017) | Peak position |
|---|---|
| UK Rock & Metal Albums (OCC) | 32 |
