= Covenant (UFO album) =

2000 album by UFO

Studio album / Live album by UFO
- Released: 25 July 2000
- Studio: Prairie Sun Recording Studios, Cotati, California, LCM Studios, Novato, California
- Genre: Hard rock, heavy metal
- Length: 48:45 (CD1) + 34:06 (CD2)
- Label: Shrapnel
- Producer: Mike Varney, Ralph Patlan and UFO

UFO chronology
Walk on Water (1995)	Covenant (2000)	Sharks (2002)

Professional ratings
Review scores
Source	Rating
AllMusic	2.5/5 stars
The Encyclopedia of Popular Music	2/5 stars

Covenant is the fifteenth album by the British hard rock band UFO. It was published as a limited edition 2-disc album, with disc 1, titled Covenant, containing entirely new material, and disc 2, titled Live USA, containing a collection of classics performed live. Covenant saw the return of Michael Schenker on guitar, as he had left the band in the middle of the Walk on Water tour.

== Track listing ==
All tracks are written by Michael Schenker and Phil Mogg, except where inticated.

CD 1: Covenant album
No.	Title	Writer(s)	Length
1.	"Love Is Forever"		4:22
2.	"Unraveled"	Pete Way, Mogg	4:16
3.	"Miss the Lights"		4:43
4.	"Midnight Train"		4:55
5.	"Fool's Gold"		5:36
6.	"In the Middle of Madness"		3:48
7.	"The Smell of Money"		3:44
8.	"Rise Again"	Way, Mogg	4:30
9.	"Serenade"		5:00
10.	"Cowboy Joe"		4:13
11.	"The World and His Dog"		3:35

CD 2: Live USA
No.	Title	Writer(s)	Length
1.	"Mother Mary"		3:52
2.	"This Kids"		4:07
3.	"Let It Roll"		4:41
4.	"Out in the Street"	Way, Mogg	5:07
5.	"Venus"		4:51
6.	"Pushed to the Limit"		4:07
7.	"Love to Love"		7:16

Japanese edition additional live tracks
No.	Title	Length
8.	"Shoot Shoot"
9.	"C'mon Everybody"

- On CD 2, the following incorrect order of tracks is printed on the cover and on the disc itself:

Curiosity
No.	Title	Length
1.	"Mother Mary"
2.	"Let It Roll"
3.	"This Kids"
4.	"Love to Love"
5.	"Out in the Street"
6.	"Pushed to the Limit"
7.	"Venus"

== Personnel ==
=== Band members ===
- Phil Mogg – vocals
- Michael Schenker – guitar
- Pete Way – bass
- Aynsley Dunbar – drums
- Simon Wright – drums (on Live USA)
- Paul Raymond – guitar, keyboards (on Live USA)

=== Additional musicians ===
- Jesse Bradman, Luis Maldonaldo – backing vocals
- Kevin Carlson – keyboards

=== Production ===
- Mike Varney – producer
- Ralph Patlan – associate producer, engineer, mixing, mastering
- Joe Marquez – engineer, mixing
- Luis Maldonado – engineer, backing vocals
- Gene Cornelius – assistant engineer
- Tim Gennert – mastering
- Steve Jennings – photography

== Charts ==
Chart (2000)	Peak position
German Albums (Offizielle Top 100)	53
UK Rock & Metal Albums (OCC)	20
