= Out of Nowhere (Vinnie Moore album) =

Studio album by Vinnie Moore
- Released: April 16, 1996
- Recorded: Kajem and Victory Studios in Gladwyne, Pennsylvania; VinMan Studios
- Genre: Instrumental rock
- Length: 45:15
- Label: Mayhem
- Producer: Vinnie Moore, Paul Hammingson

Vinnie Moore chronology
Meltdown (1991)	Out of Nowhere (1996)	The Maze (1999)

Professional ratings
Review scores
Source	Rating
Allmusic	3/5 stars

Out of Nowhere is the fourth studio album by guitarist Vinnie Moore, released on April 16, 1996, through Mayhem Records.

== Track listing ==
All tracks are written by Vinnie Moore, except where noted.

No.	Title	Length
1.	"With the Flow"	3:45
2.	"Losing Faith"	4:09
3.	"Echoes"	4:09
4.	"Thunderball"	3:29
5.	"From Now On"	3:47
6.	"Time Traveler"	4:13
7.	"VinMan's Brew"	4:20
8.	"She's Only Sleeping"	3:47
9.	"Am I Only Dreaming?" (Moore, Brian Tichy)	4:01
10.	"770 Days"	3:44
11.	"Move That Thang!"	3:56
12.	"Winter Sun"	1:55
Total length:		45:15

== Personnel ==
- Vinnie Moore – guitar, production
- Brian Tichy – drums
- Dorian Heartsong – bass
- Paul Hammingson – engineering, mixing, production
- Brian Stover – engineering
- Brad Catiett – engineering
- Thom Cadley – mixing
- Greg Calbi – mastering
