= Meltdown (Vinnie Moore album) =

Studio album by Vinnie Moore
- Released: 1991
- Recorded: November 1990
- Studios: Millbrook Sound, Millbrook, New York
- Genre: Instrumental rock
- Length: 50:13
- Label: Relativity
- Producer: Vinnie Moore

Vinnie Moore chronology
Time Odyssey (1988)	Meltdown (1991)	Out of Nowhere (1996)

Meltdown is the third studio album by the American guitarist Vinnie Moore, released in 1991 through Relativity Records. Moore wanted to use a singer on the album but could not find a suitable one. He supported the album with a North American tour.

== Critical reception ==
Professional ratings
Review scores
Source	Rating
AllMusic	2/5 stars
Chicago Tribune	3/4 stars
The San Diego Union-Tribune	2.5/4 stars

The Washington Post wrote that "this is fast and furious, finger-flying stuff for the most part, a power trio album devoted to torrid instrumental flights and designed to compete with the likes of Steve Vai." The Chicago Tribune concluded that "Moore's production is intense—much better than that of labelmate Steve Vai—with crisp snares, wicked-yet-smooth guitar squeals and steady low end."

== Track listing ==
All tracks are written by Vinnie Moore.

No.	Title	Length
1.	"Meltdown"	3:34
2.	"Let's Go"	4:35
3.	"Ridin' High"	4:42
4.	"Earthshaker"	4:58
5.	"Deep Sea"	6:34
6.	"Cinema"	5:02
7.	"Midnight Rain"	4:50
8.	"Where Angels Sing"	1:47
9.	"Check It Out!"	5:02
10.	"Last Chance"	3:51
11.	"Coming Home"	5:18
Total length:		50:13

== Personnel ==
- Vinnie Moore – guitar, production
- Joe Franco – drums
- Greg Smith – bass
- Paul Orofino – engineering
- Bob Ludwig – mastering
