= Seven Deadly =

Studio album by UFO
- Released: 27 February 2012
- Recorded: Area 51 Studio, Celle, Germany
- Genre: Hard rock, heavy metal
- Length: 48:04
- Label: SPV/Steamhammer
- Producer: Tommy Newton

UFO chronology
The Visitor (2009)	Seven Deadly (2012)	A Conspiracy of Stars (2015)

Professional ratings
Review scores
Source	Rating
Classic Rock	8/10 stars

Seven Deadly is the twentieth studio album by British hard rock band UFO, released on 27 February 2012.

== Reception ==
Since its release, this album has been met with mostly positive reviews. Geoff Barton of Classic Rock found the album "bursting with creativity and athleticism" and praised Phil Mogg for the "vim and vigour" of his singing and for his "evocative and erudite" lyrics. He adds that the album has a "darker edge this time around" and may be the best possible swansong for UFO. Rebecca Miller of Metal Temple wrote, "Not contented to sit back on their laurels, the band continues to produce high quality rock albums and Seven Deadly is certainly no exception".

== Track listing ==
All tracks are written by Vinnie Moore and Phil Mogg except where noted.

No.	Title	Writer(s)	Length
1.	"Fight Night"	Paul Raymond, Mogg	4:43
2.	"Wonderland"		5:17
3.	"Mojo Town"		4:03
4.	"Angel Station"		6:35
5.	"Year of the Gun"	Raymond, Mogg	4:15
6.	"The Last Stone Rider"		4:15
7.	"Steal Yourself"		4:55
8.	"Burn Your House Down"		5:07
9.	"The Fear"	Raymond, Mogg	3:50
10.	"Waving Good Bye"		5:20

Limited edition bonus tracks
No.	Title	Writer(s)	Length
11.	"Other Men's Wives"		3:53
12.	"Bag o' Blues"	Raymond, Mogg	3:03

== Personnel ==
Band members

- Phil Mogg – vocals
- Vinnie Moore – lead guitar
- Paul Raymond – keyboards, rhythm guitar
- Andy Parker – drums

Additional musicians

- Lars Lehmann – bass
- Alexa Wild, Marino Carlini – backing vocals
- Marc Hothan – harp on "The Fear"

== Charts ==
Chart (2012)	Peak position
German Albums (Offizielle Top 100)	55
Scottish Albums (OCC)	50
Swedish Albums (Sverigetopplistan)	59
UK Albums (OCC)	63
UK Independent Albums (OCC)	9
UK Rock & Metal Albums (OCC)	1

== Credits ==
- Tommy Newton – recorded and mixed
- Andy Le Vien – additional recordings at RMS Studio
- Steve Ward – additional recordings at SW Sounds
- Tristan Greatrex – album artwork
- Pat Johnson – band photo
- Peter Knorn – management
