= The Monkey Puzzle (UFO album) =

Studio album by UFO
- Released: 25 September 2006
- Recorded: Area 51 Studios, Celle, Germany, 2006
- Genre: Hard rock, heavy metal
- Length: 46:10
- Label: SPV/Steamhammer
- Producer: Tommy Newton

UFO chronology
You Are Here (2004)	The Monkey Puzzle (2006)	The Visitor (2009)

Professional ratings
Review scores
Source	Rating
Allmusic	3.5/5 stars

The Monkey Puzzle is the eighteenth studio album by the British hard rock band UFO. It was released on 25 September 2006 in Europe and a day later on 26 September in the United States. It also marks the return of founding drummer Andy Parker to the band and the last to feature founding bassist Pete Way.

== Track listing ==
All tracks are written by Vinnie Moore and Phil Mogg except as noted.

No.	Title	Writer(s)	Length
1.	"Hard Being Me"	Pete Way, Moore, Mogg	3:35
2.	"Heavenly Body"		3:52
3.	"Some Other Guy"		4:38
4.	"Who's Fooling Who?"	Way, Moore, Mogg	3:57
5.	"Black and Blue"	Paul Raymond, Mogg	5:29
6.	"Drink Too Much"		4:40
7.	"World Cruise"		3:29
8.	"Down by the River"		3:18
9.	"Good Bye You"		4:40
10.	"Rolling Man"		4:24
11.	"Kingston Town"	Raymond, Mogg	4:08

== Personnel ==
Band members

- Phil Mogg – vocals
- Vinnie Moore – guitars
- Pete Way – bass
- Paul Raymond – keyboards, backing vocals
- Andy Parker – drums

Production

- Tommy Newton – producer, engineer, mixing
- Tristan Greatrex – album artwork
- Kai Swillus – photography

== Charts ==
Chart (2006)	Peak position
UK Rock & Metal Albums (OCC)	20
