= Walk on Water (UFO album) =

Studio album by UFO
- Released: 14 April 1995 (Japan)
- Studio: Rumbo Recorders (Los Angeles)
- Genre: Hard rock, heavy metal
- Length: 52:02
- Label: Zero Corporation
- Producer: Ron Nevison

UFO chronology
High Stakes & Dangerous Men (1992)	Walk on Water (1995)	Covenant (2000)

Original Cover (Japan)

Professional ratings
Review scores
Source	Rating
AllMusic	3.5/5 stars
Collector's Guide to Heavy Metal	8/10
The Encyclopedia of Popular Music	3/5 stars

Walk on Water is the fourteenth album from the British hard rock band UFO, marking the return of German guitarist Michael Schenker to the band, as well as the returns of keyboardist Paul Raymond and founding drummer Andy Parker. The album did not chart. It was recorded at Rumbo Recorders in Canoga Park, California. It was released first and only in Japan on 14 April 1995 with 11 tracks and in 1997 in other countries with only 10 tracks. It has since been re-released on numerous occasions, with a variety of covers.

== Track listing ==
No.	Title	Writer(s)	Length
1.	"A Self-Made Man"	Phil Mogg, Michael Schenker	6:24
2.	"Venus"	Mogg, Schenker	5:20
3.	"Pushed to the Limit"	Mogg, Schenker	3:50
4.	"Stopped by a Bullet (of Love)"	Mogg, Schenker	4:35
5.	"Darker Days"	Mogg, Schenker	5:37
6.	"Running on Empty"	Mogg, Schenker	5:11
7.	"Knock, Knock"	Mogg, Pete Way	4:21
8.	"Dreaming of Summer"	Mogg, Schenker	7:03
9.	"Doctor Doctor '95" (Re-recorded version)	Mogg, Schenker	4:27
10.	"Lights Out '95" (Re-recorded version)	Mogg, Andy Parker, Schenker, Way	5:13
11.	"Message for Japan" (Japanese edition bonus track)		6:10
Total length:			52:02

Bonus tracks

No.	Title	Writer(s)	Length
11.	"Fortune Town" (by Mogg/Way)	Mogg, Way	4:20
12.	"I Will Be There" (by Michael Schenker Group)	Schenker, Leif Sundin	5:03
13.	"Public Enemy #1" (by Paul Raymond Project)	Paul Raymond	3:17

== Personnel ==
UFO

- Phil Mogg – vocals
- Michael Schenker – lead guitar
- Pete Way – bass
- Paul Raymond – keyboards, rhythm guitar
- Andy Parker – drums

Additional musician

- Mark Philips – backing vocals

Production

- Ron Nevison – production, engineering, mixing

== Charts ==
Chart (1997)	Peak position
UK Rock & Metal Albums (OCC)	16
