= You Are Here (UFO album) =

Studio album by UFO
- Released: 16 March 2004
- Recorded: Area 51 Studios, Celle, Germany
- Genre: Hard rock, heavy metal
- Length: 52:52
- Label: SPV/Steamhammer
- Producer: Tommy Newton

UFO chronology
Sharks (2002)	You Are Here (2004)	The Monkey Puzzle (2006)

Professional ratings
Review scores
Source	Rating
AllMusic	2.5/5 stars

You Are Here is the seventeenth studio album by the British hard rock band UFO, released in 2004 by the German record label SPV/Steamhammer. This is the first album with the new band members, Vinnie Moore and Jason Bonham, who replaced the long-time guitarist Michael Schenker and drummer Aynsley Dunbar.

== Track listing ==
No.	Title	Writer(s)	Length
1.	"When Daylight Goes to Town"	Phil Mogg, Vinnie Moore	4:33
2.	"Black Cold Coffee"	Mogg, Moore	3:20
3.	"The Wild One"	Mogg, Moore	5:39
4.	"Give It Up"	Mogg, Pete Way, Moore	4:25
5.	"Call Me"	Mogg, Moore	4:03
6.	"Slipping Away"	Mogg, Moore	4:56
7.	"The Spark That Is Us"	Mogg, Jason Bonham, Moore, Paul Raymond	4:11
8.	"Sympathy"	Raymond	3:48
9.	"Mr. Freeze"	Mogg, Moore	4:43
10.	"Jello Man"	Mogg, Moore	4:13
11.	"Baby Blue"	Mogg, Moore	4:31
12.	"Swallow"	Mogg, Bonham, Moore	4:30

Japanese edition bonus tracks
No.	Title	Length
13.	"Messing Up The Bed"	4:46

== Personnel ==
Band members

- Phil Mogg – vocals
- Vinnie Moore – guitars
- Pete Way – bass
- Paul Raymond – keyboards
- Jason Bonham – drums, backing vocals

Production

- Tommy Newton – producer, engineer, mixing
