= To the Core =

Studio album by Vinnie Moore
- Released: May 26, 2009
- Recorded: The Core in Northern California
- Genre: Instrumental rock
- Length: 59:03
- Label: Mascot
- Producer: Vinnie Moore

Vinnie Moore chronology
Collection: The Shrapnel Years (2006)	To the Core (2009)	Aerial Visions (2015)

Professional ratings
Review scores
Source	Rating
AllMusic	3.5/5 stars

To the Core is the seventh studio album by guitarist Vinnie Moore, released on May 26, 2009 through Mascot Records.

== Track listing ==
All tracks are written by Vinnie Moore.

No.	Title	Length
1.	"Fly"	4:51
2.	"Panic Attack"	6:19
3.	"Off the Hook"	5:15
4.	"Transcendence"	3:55
5.	"Soul Caravan"	5:57
6.	"Jigsaw"	3:43
7.	"Remorse"	7:02
8.	"Tailspin"	5:33
9.	"Over My Head"	3:58
10.	"Into the Open Highway"	6:49
11.	"Into the Sunset"	5:41
Total length:		59:03

== Personnel ==
- Vinnie Moore – guitar, production
- Tim Lehner – keyboard
- Van Romaine – drums
- John DeServio – bass
- Tim Conklin – engineering
- Paul Northfield – mixing
- Ryan J-W Smith – mastering
