= The Visitor (UFO album) =

Studio album by UFO
- Released: 2 June 2009
- Recorded: February – March 2009
- Genre: Hard rock, heavy metal
- Length: 42:21
- Label: SPV/Steamhammer
- Producer: Tommy Newton

UFO chronology
The Monkey Puzzle (2006)	The Visitor (2009)	Seven Deadly (2012)

Professional ratings
Review scores
Source	Rating
AllMusic	3.5/5 stars
Dangerdog Music Reviews	4.5/5 stars

The Visitor is the nineteenth studio album by the British hard rock band UFO, which was released on 2 June 2009. Bass parts were recorded by Peter Pichl. Since there are no writing credits on the album booklet, they were posted on UFO's official website (June 2009).

The digipak edition bonus track, "Dancing with St. Peter", had previously been recorded by Phil Mogg with his side project, $ign Of 4, featuring Mogg/Way guitarist Jeff Kollman, one-time Michael Schenker Group drummer Shane Gaalaas, and bassist Jimmy Curtain. The album was originally released in 2002 through Track Records and re-issued in 2008 by Kollman's label Marmaduke Records under the name Mogg & The Sign Of 4.

== Track listing ==
All lyrics are written by Phil Mogg; all music is composed by Vinnie Moore, except where noted.

No.	Title	Writer(s)	Length
1.	"Saving Me"		5:08
2.	"On the Waterfront"	Paul Raymond	3:50
3.	"Hell Driver"		4:26
4.	"Stop Breaking Down"		4:55
5.	"Rock Ready"		3:06
6.	"Living Proof"		4:32
7.	"Can't Buy a Thrill"		5:14
8.	"Forsaken"	Raymond	3:57
9.	"Villains & Thieves"	Raymond	3:34
10.	"Stranger in Town"	Robert Barth, Andy Parker	3:39

Digipak edition bonus track
No.	Title	Writer(s)	Length
11.	"Dancing with St. Peter (2009 Edition)"	Mogg, Jeff Kollman, Shane Gaalaas	6:30

== Personnel ==
Band members

- Phil Mogg – vocals
- Vinnie Moore – guitars
- Paul Raymond – keyboards, engineer
- Andy Parker – drums

Additional musicians

- Peter Pichl – bass
- Martina Frank – backing vocals on "Living Proof" and "Forsaken"
- Melanie Newton – backing vocals on "On the Waterfront" and "Forsaken"
- Olaf Senkbeil – backing vocals on "Stop Breaking Down", "Saving Me", "Hell Driver" and "On the Waterfront"

== Credits ==
- Tommy Newton – producer, engineer, mixing
- Andy Le Vein – engineer
- Tristan Greatrex – album artwork
- Kai Swillus – photography
- Peter Knorn – management

== Charts ==
Chart (2009)	Peak position
German Albums (Offizielle Top 100)	86
Greek Albums (IFPI)	31
Scottish Albums (OCC)	67
UK Albums (OCC)	99
UK Rock & Metal Albums (OCC)	4
