= The Maze (album) =

Studio album by Vinnie Moore
- Released: March 23, 1999
- Studio: Prairie Sun Recording; Cotati; Sound Temple Studio; Oakland; VinMan Studios
- Genre: Instrumental rock; neoclassical metal
- Length: 59:04
- Label: Shrapnel
- Producer: Vinnie Moore; Mike Varney

Vinnie Moore chronology
Out of Nowhere (1996)	The Maze (1999)	Live! (2000)

Professional ratings
Review scores
Source	Rating
AllMusic	4.5/5 stars

The Maze is the fifth studio album by guitarist Vinnie Moore, released on March 23, 1999 through Shrapnel Records.

== Track listing ==
All tracks are written by Vinnie Moore.

No.	Title	Length
1.	"The Maze"	8:42
2.	"King of Kings"	5:48
3.	"Cryptic Dreams"	5:33
4.	"Never Been to Barcelona"	4:21
5.	"Watching from the Light"	4:45
6.	"The Thinking Machine"	4:42
7.	"Eye of the Beholder"	6:00
8.	"Rain"	4:26
9.	"In the Healing Garden (Note: On some import versions, "In the Healing Garden" and "Fear and Trepidation" are printed in reverse order on the back cover.)"	6:35
10.	"Fear and Trepidation"	8:12
Total length:		59:04

== Personnel ==
- Vinnie Moore – guitar, mixing, production
- Tony MacAlpine – keyboard
- Shane Gaalaas – drums
- Dave LaRue – bass
- Mark Rennick – engineering
- Noah Landis – engineering
- James Murphy – engineering
- Gustavo Venegas – engineering
- Paul Orofino – mixing
- Christopher Ash – mastering
- Mike Varney – executive production
