= Live! (Vinnie Moore album) =

Live album by Vinnie Moore
- Released: January 25, 2000
- Recorded: May 5–6, 1999 at The Edge in Palo Alto, California
- Genre: Instrumental rock, neoclassical metal
- Length: 55:00
- Label: Shrapnel
- Producer: Vinnie Moore

Vinnie Moore chronology
The Maze (1999)	Live! (2000)	Defying Gravity (2001)

Professional ratings
Review scores
Source	Rating
AllMusic	3/5 stars

Live! is a live album by guitarist Vinnie Moore, released on January 25, 2000 through Shrapnel Records.

== Track listing ==
All tracks are written by Vinnie Moore.

No.	Title	Length
1.	"The Thinking Machine"	3:58
2.	"The Maze"	6:37
3.	"Cryptic Dreams"	4:47
4.	"Meltdown"	3:37
5.	"Never Been to Barcelona"	4:32
6.	"She's Only Sleeping"	3:31
7.	"VinMan's Brew"	6:34
8.	"Check It Out!"	5:14
9.	"Rain"	4:24
10.	"Daydream"	2:52
11.	"Watching from the Light"	4:32
12.	"With the Flow"	4:22
Total length:		55:00

== Personnel ==
- Vinnie Moore – guitar, mixing, production
- Wayne Findlay – guitar, keyboard
- Shane Gaalaas – drums, percussion
- Barry Sparks – bass
- Mat Diamond – engineering
- Paul Orofino – mixing, mastering
