= UFO (band) =

English rock band

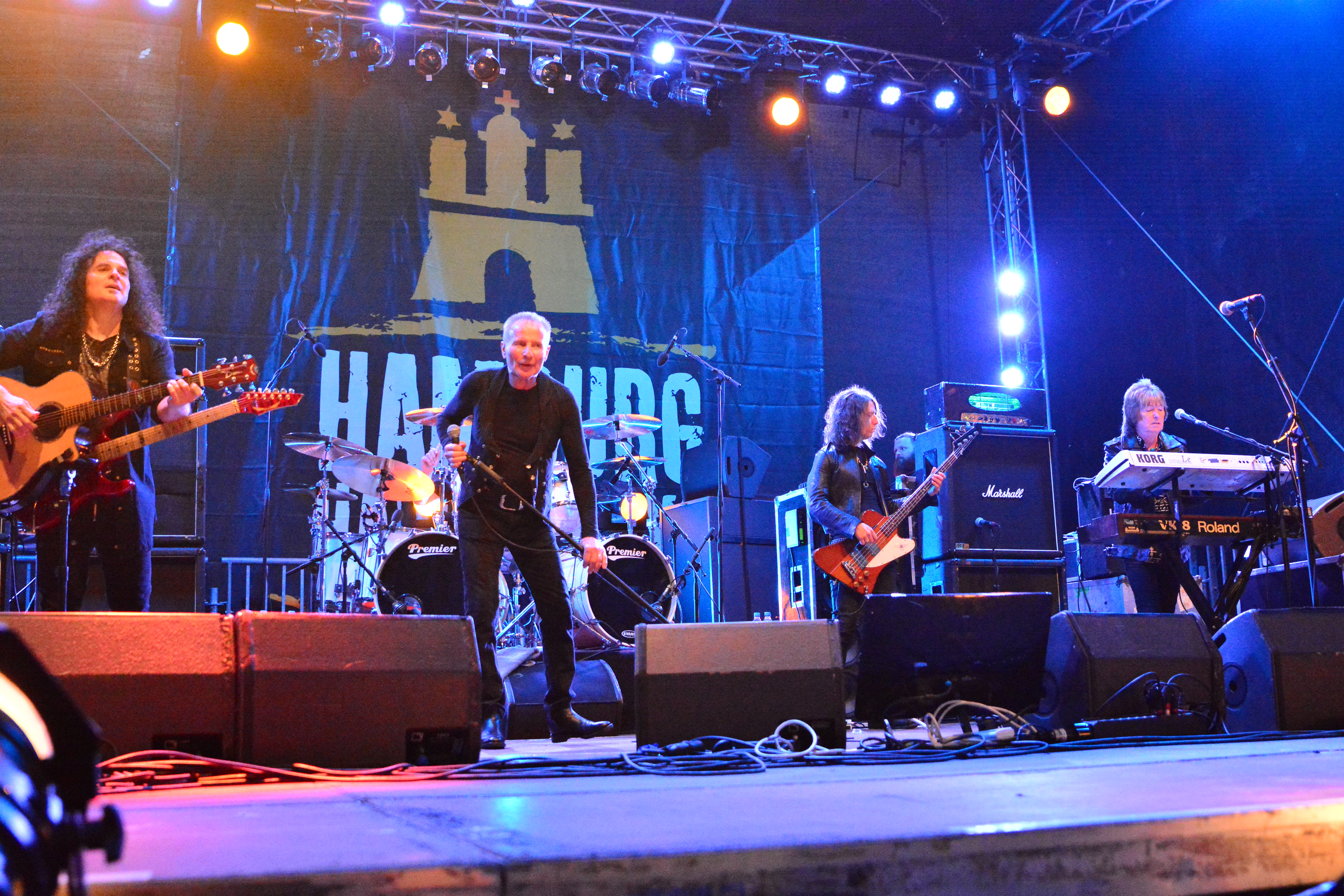
- UFO performing in 2015

Background information
- Origin: London, England
- Genres: Hard rock, heavy metal, space rock (early)
- Works: Discography
- Years active: 1968–1983; 1984–1989; 1991–2024
- Labels: Beacon; Chrysalis; Cleopatra; Metal Blade; Steamhammer
- Spinoffs: The Michael Schenker Group; Fastway; Waysted
- Past members: Phil Mogg; Andy Parker; Pete Way; Mick Bolton; Larry Wallis; Bernie Marsden; Michael Schenker; Paul Chapman; Danny Peyronel; Paul Raymond; Neil Carter; Paul Gray; Tommy McClendon; Jim Simpson; Myke Gray; Fabio Del Rio; Rik Sandford; Tony Glidewell; Erik Gamans; Laurence Archer; Clive Edwards; Jem Davis; Simon Wright; Aynsley Dunbar; Vinnie Moore; Jason Bonham; Rob De Luca
- Website: ufo.tmstor.es
- Logo
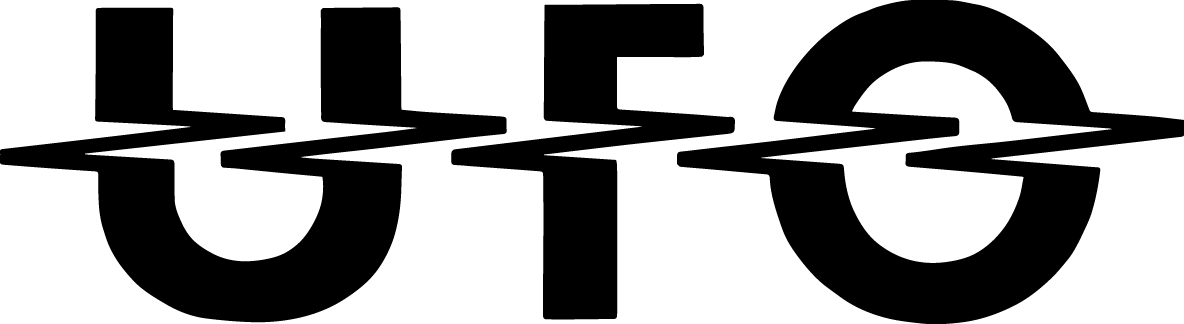

UFO were an English rock band formed in London in 1968. They became a transitional group between early hard rock and heavy metal and the new wave of British heavy metal (NWOBHM). The band's final line-up consisted of vocalist Phil Mogg, lead guitarist Vinnie Moore, rhythm guitarist and keyboardist Neil Carter, bass guitarist Rob De Luca, and drummer Andy Parker. They had gone through several line-up changes, leaving Mogg as the only constant member, and had disbanded three times (first between April 1983 and October 1984, second from 1989 to 1991, and third in 2024). The band's "classic" line-up comprised Mogg, Parker, bassist Pete Way, and former Scorpions guitarist Michael Schenker, with keyboardist Paul Raymond joining later. In May 2018, Mogg announced that he would retire from UFO after one last tour as a member of the band in 2019; however, their farewell tour was set to conclude in 2022 before it was cancelled, due to Mogg's health issues. Mogg confirmed UFO's third disbandment in April 2024.

Over a career spanning five decades, UFO released 23 studio albums (including one cover album), 14 live albums, and 16 compilation albums. They achieved moderate success in the late 1970s and early 1980s with several albums and singles (including their 1979 live album Strangers in the Night) in the UK and US Top 40 charts, and have sold over 20 million records worldwide. Some of their most-recognised songs include "Doctor Doctor", "Rock Bottom", "Natural Thing", "Lights Out", "Too Hot to Handle" and "Only You Can Rock Me". UFO are considered one of the greatest classic hard rock acts, and often cited as one of the key influences on the 1980s and 1990s hard rock and heavy metal scenes. The band were ranked number 84 on VH1's "100 Greatest Artists of Hard Rock".

== History ==
=== Beginning (1968–1972) ===
Lead singer Phil Mogg, guitarist Mick Bolton, bassist Pete Way, and drummer Andy Parker formed the band in 1968. Originally calling themselves Hocus Pocus, the group changed their name to UFO. They signed to the Beacon Records label, headed by Antiguan-born Milton Samuel. Their first album, UFO 1, released in 1970, is a typical example of early hard rock; it includes a heavy version of the Eddie Cochran classic "C'mon Everybody". Neither their first nor their second album, UFO 2: Flying, reached the charts, but the song "Boogie For George" from the first album reached No. 30 on the German singles chart, and "Prince Kajuku" from Flying reached No. 26. At this time UFO attracted little interest in Britain and America. Some of their early work was strongly influenced by space rock (their second album, featuring a 26-minute title track and a 19-minute-long track "Star Storm", was subtitled One Hour Space Rock) that was modestly popular at the time, but the band soon realised the style was somewhat limited. They released the Live album, recorded at a concert in Tokyo, at the end of 1971. Mick Bolton left the group in January 1972 after arguments with Mogg and Parker, and UFO set out to find a guitarist who could provide the band with a more standard rock sound.

=== International success (1973–1978) ===
After brief trial runs with guitarists Larry Wallis (February–October 1972) and Bernie Marsden (who toured with UFO in Europe and recorded a pair of demos, "Oh My" and "Sixteen"), the band recruited Michael Schenker from the Scorpions in June 1973. Schenker was only 18 but already a well-respected guitarist. On a new label, Chrysalis Records, the revamped UFO recorded a non-LP single in 1973, "Give Her the Gun" and "Sweet Little Thing", with producer Derek Lawrence. In 1974, under producer Leo Lyons (formerly of Ten Years After), UFO recorded Phenomenon, which highlighted the band's harder-edged guitar sound. Phenomenon contains many fan favourites such as "Doctor Doctor" (later a minor hit single as a live track) and "Rock Bottom" (which was extended live to provide a showcase for Schenker). By the time of the Phenomenon tour, ex-Skid Row guitarist Paul "Tonka" Chapman joined the group, but he left in January 1975 to form Lone Star.

Two subsequent albums, Force It (July 1975) and No Heavy Petting (May 1976; recorded with ex-Heavy Metal Kids' Danny Peyronel, who served as a regular keyboardist as well as harmony vocalist and songwriter), and extensive touring brought UFO increased visibility with American audiences and increased their following in the UK. The song "Belladonna" from No Heavy Petting was popular in the USSR, owing to a cover version by Alexander Barykin.

In July 1976, the band recruited keyboardist and rhythm guitarist Paul Raymond from Savoy Brown to make 1977's Lights Out. The album's highlights include the songs "Too Hot to Handle", "Lights Out", and the seven-minute opus "Love to Love" among others. With Lights Out, the band received substantial critical acclaim, and the album saw them playing at arenas and theaters across the United States and Europe, opening for bands like Rush and AC/DC. With their new-found success, the band went back into the studio to record their next album Obsession (1978). While Obsession was not as successful as Lights Out, the band still maintained their arena status while touring for the album, playing with AC/DC and Rush again, and other bands like Blue Öyster Cult, Styx, Foghat, Jethro Tull, REO Speedwagon and Molly Hatchet; as part of the Obsession tour, UFO recorded the live album, Strangers in the Night, which was released in January 1979. Strangers was a critical and commercial success, reaching Number 7 in the UK Albums Chart in February 1979, and it was named fourth-best live rock album of all time by Classic Rock magazine. A tour to support the live album followed, playing with bands like AC/DC, Kiss, Cheap Trick, Journey, Thin Lizzy, Nazareth and Judas Priest, and appearing at the California World Music Festival with Aerosmith, Van Halen, Toto and April Wine.

=== Post-Schenker era and breaks (1978–1990) ===
Tensions grew between Mogg and Schenker in the late 1970s, possibly owing to Schenker often leaving before or during shows. Soon after UFO's show at the Keystone Palo Alto, on 29 October 1978, Schenker left the band. "Obviously we were disappointed," recalled Pete Way. "It's not easy to promote an album without a guitarist. We were starting to draw a lot of people and the album was selling. But he'd also disappeared on the Lights Out tour, so nothing surprised us."

Schenker briefly returned to the Scorpions before forming his own Michael Schenker Group.

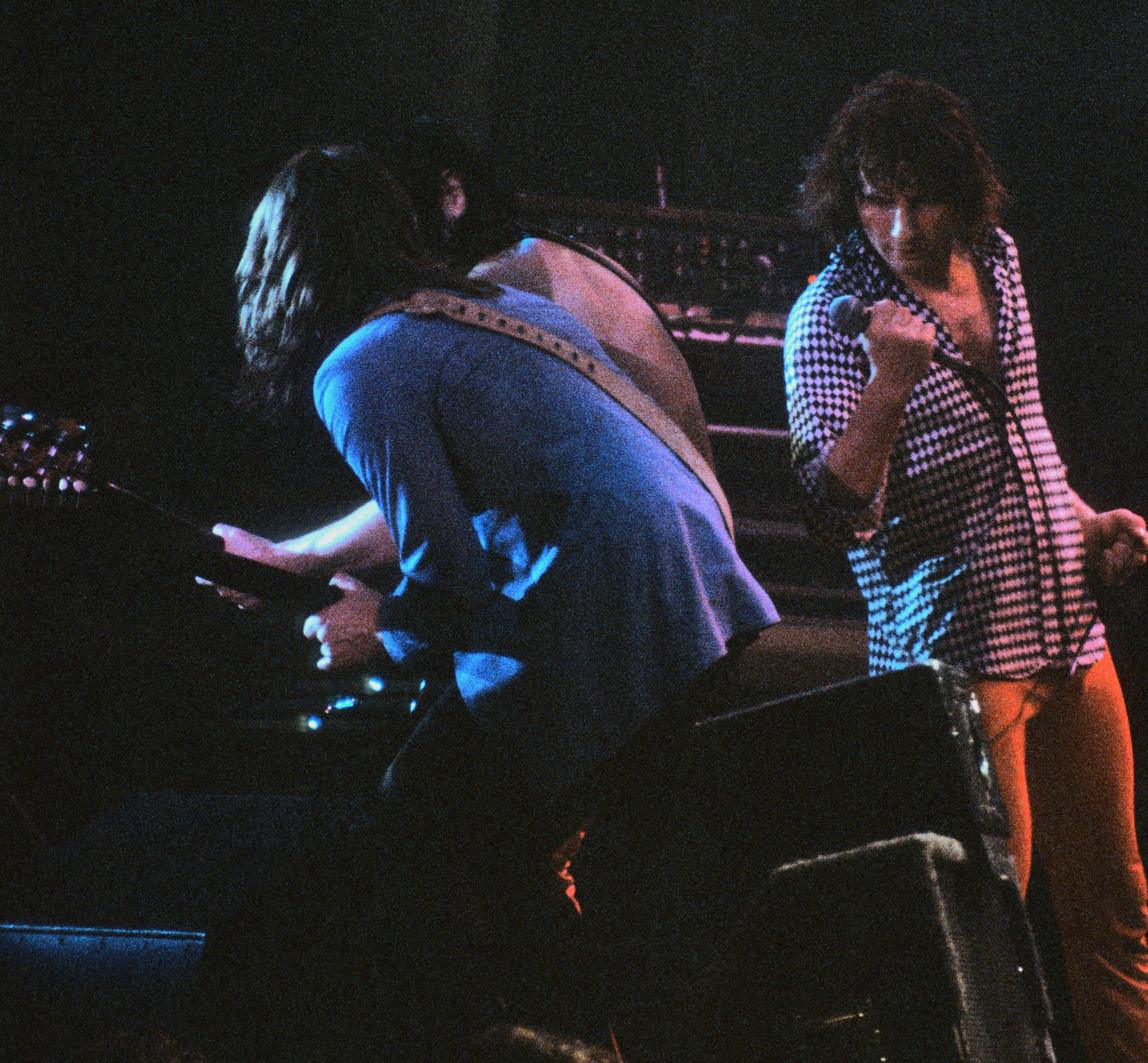
Paul Chapman, Pete Way and Phil Mogg of UFO performing at the International Amphitheatre in Chicago on March 16, 1980.

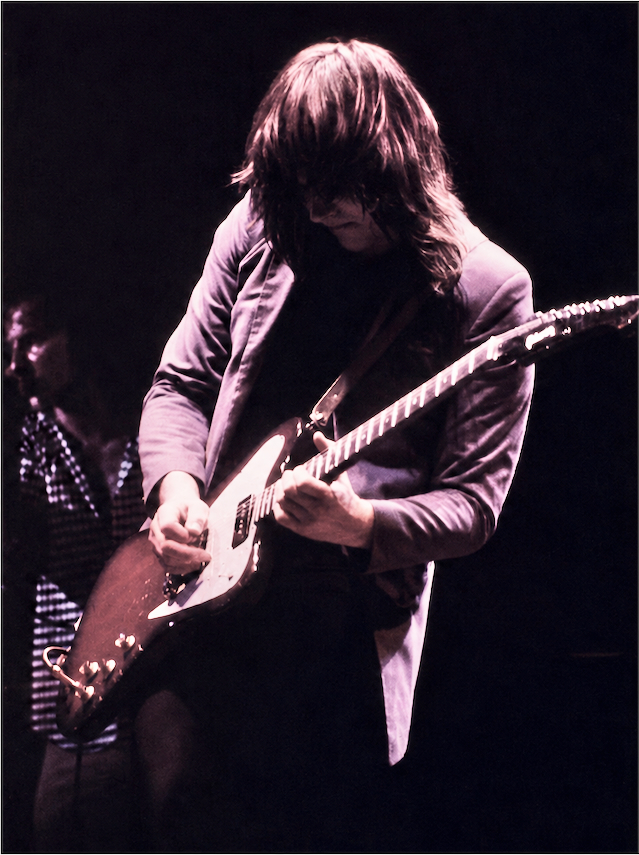
Paul Chapman with Phil Mogg at the International Amphitheatre in Chicago on March 16, 1980.

After Schenker's exit, UFO rehired guitarist Paul Chapman, who brought unused track ideas from Lone Star's drummer Dixie Lee. The band's next LP – No Place to Run, released in January 1980 – was produced by former Beatles producer George Martin. It failed to match the success of its predecessors, though it fractionally missed the UK Top 10.

Paul Raymond left at the end of the No Place To Run tour. He was replaced by John Sloman from Lone Star on keyboards for a couple of months, then by former Wild Horses guitarist and keyboardist Neil Carter, who helped fill the void in the songwriting left by Schenker's departure. Carter debuted with UFO on stage at the three-day Reading Festival on 23 August 1980, when the band played as the Saturday night headliner.

At the beginning of the following year, UFO released the self-produced The Wild, the Willing and the Innocent, which had a lighter, contemporary pop rock sound. The album achieved mild success in the UK, reaching the UK Top 20, and the single "Lonely Heart" was released.

In February 1982, the band released Mechanix. It was successful in the UK, where it reached No. 8, the band's highest ever placing. Later that year, founding member Pete Way left the band to form Fastway with Motörhead guitarist "Fast" Eddie Clarke and then his own band, Waysted. He was replaced by Talas bassist Billy Sheehan. UFO released Making Contact in 1983, but the album was a critical and commercial failure. Thus, that March, UFO decided to disband. The band played a UK farewell tour with Paul Gray (former bassist with Eddie and the Hot Rods and the Damned). However, there was a hint that this might not be permanent when UFO released a compilation album featuring songs by UFO (as well as other groups featuring ex-members of UFO) entitled Headstone, the sleeve of which showed a headstone, denoting UFO with their formation date but an incomplete end date.

This proved to be a short break; just short of two years later, in late 1984, Mogg assembled a new UFO line-up, featuring Paul Gray on bass again, ex-Diamond Head drummer Robbie France (replaced in 1985 by former Magnum drummer Jim Simpson), and Atomik Tommy M (Tommy McClendon), a former roadie who also wrote lyrics for Loudness, on guitar, with Paul Raymond rejoining shortly afterward, and released Misdemeanor. Raymond left again in 1986 and was replaced by David Jacobson, who, along with Gray, would leave in 1987, and Pete Way rejoined on bass. Before Gray's departure, the band recorded the EP Ain't Misbehavin which was released in 1988. Despite the renewed activity of the band, neither release was financially successful, and they officially disbanded again in 1989 after a string of guitarists replacing McClendon: Myke Gray of Jagged Edge in late 1987, former Starfighters guitarist Rik Sandford and Tony Glidewell in 1988, and finally in 1989 future Cold Sweat guitarist Erik Gamans.

=== Reunion(s) (1991–2003) ===
In 1991, Mogg and Way decided to put a new UFO line-up together with former Wild Horses members Clive Edwards on drums, Laurence Archer on guitar, and keyboardist Jem Davis joining the band and they released High Stakes & Dangerous Men. While only released on a small independent label, High Stakes was enough to generate serious interest in a full-blown reunion. The following year, the classic late-1970s UFO line-up – Mogg, Schenker, Way, Raymond and Parker – reunited, and the resulting album was Walk on Water (1995). This line-up (barring Parker's replacement by AC/DC's Simon Wright on drums) went on a world tour. However, tensions arose again, and Schenker left the band only four shows into the tour, walking off stage mid-set in the very venue, the Keystone Palo Alto, where their October 1978 tour died. Thereafter, the other members again went their separate ways. However, Schenker returned to the fold in 1998, and the band embarked on another tour, with Parker again replaced by a new drummer. They played at the Astoria, Charing Cross Road, London in 1998.

Mogg and Way continued working together throughout this fluctuating band membership, releasing two albums under the Mogg/Way name in the late 1990s, Edge of the World and Chocolate Box.

In 2000, Schenker rejoined UFO again and the band released the double CD Covenant (with Aynsley Dunbar on drums), which contained a disc of new material and a disc of live classics. In 2002, the band recorded Sharks; shortly after Sharks was released, Schenker left the band yet again and was replaced with Vinnie Moore. and the official announcement was made in July 2003. In 2003, Michael Schenker and Pete Way released The Plot with drummer Jeff Martin.

=== Vinnie Moore-era and return to chart success (2004–2017) ===
In 2004, UFO released their 17th studio album You Are Here with their new permanent guitarist Vinnie Moore and Jason Bonham on drums (intermittently). The band was forced to cancel summer 2004 tour dates due to United States work permit issues. UFO recorded their live set and released a double-DVD recording titled Showtime (2005) along with a double live CD on SPV in November 2005, mixing a number of re-recorded studio songs. In November 2005, Andy Parker returned to the band to play in the Piorno Rock Festival in Granada, Spain. UFO's eighteenth studio album, titled The Monkey Puzzle, was released in 2006.

Andy Parker returned in early 2007, after recovering from leg surgery. On the 2008 tour, Pete Way was unable to get a work visa to enter the United States, Rob De Luca (Sebastian Bach's band, Of Earth, Spread Eagle) filling in.

UFO released their 19th studio album, The Visitor, in June 2009, and followed with a tour of the UK, but without Pete Way, who was suffering from a medical condition. Bass tracks on The Visitor were played by Peter Pichl, and Pete Way was not credited as a band member on The Visitor cover, nor was any other bassist. However, the album saw UFO's return to the UK Albums Chart for the first time in almost 15 years.

In July 2009, UFO released a six-CD live concert box set, containing recordings of six concerts between 1975 and 1982, as well as previously unreleased live songs.

On their 2011 tour, they were accompanied by Barry Sparks playing bass.

By December 2010, UFO had been working on a twentieth studio album, which was supposed to be released in June 2011. Titled Seven Deadly, was released on 27 February 2012, with Lars Lehmann on bass, to almost universally good reviews and a higher chart position than The Visitor also charting in Germany, Sweden, and the Billboard indie charts.

In 2011, former band members Danny Peyronel, Laurence Archer, and Clive Edwards teamed up with bassist Rocky Newton (ex-McAuley Schenker Group) to form a band entitled X-UFO. In live performances, X-UFO played sets of vintage UFO songs, later renamed House Of X to perform their own material. Their eponymous album was released on 24 October 2014.

In 2013, Paul Raymond revealed that a new UFO album was in the works, but there was "no detailed talk of that yet." The album, titled A Conspiracy of Stars, was released on 23 February 2015.

On 10 September 2016, guitarist Vinnie Moore announced on Facebook that UFO were in the studio recording a covers album. The album, titled The Salentino Cuts, was released on 29 September 2017.

=== 50th anniversary tour and retirement (2018–present) ===
In May 2018, vocalist Mogg announced that UFO's 50th anniversary tour in 2019 would be his last one as the frontman of the band, who may also either split up or move on with a replacement for him. Mogg explained, "This decision has been a long time coming. I've considered stepping down at the end of UFO's previous two tours. I don't want to call this a farewell tour as I hate that word, but next year's gigs will represent my final tap-dancing appearances with the band." He added that "the timing feels right" for him to quit, and that "there will be a final tour of the U.K. and we will also play some shows in selected other cities that the band has a strong connection with. But outside of the U.K. this won't be a long tour." Despite earlier reports that Mogg had intended to leave the band in 2019, the band planned to resume their touring activities in 2022, which had been pushed back from a year earlier due to the COVID-19 pandemic. UFO's last-ever show was intended to take place on 29 October 2022 in Athens, Greece, where the band performed its first show with current guitarist Vinnie Moore 18 years earlier. However, the show was cancelled.

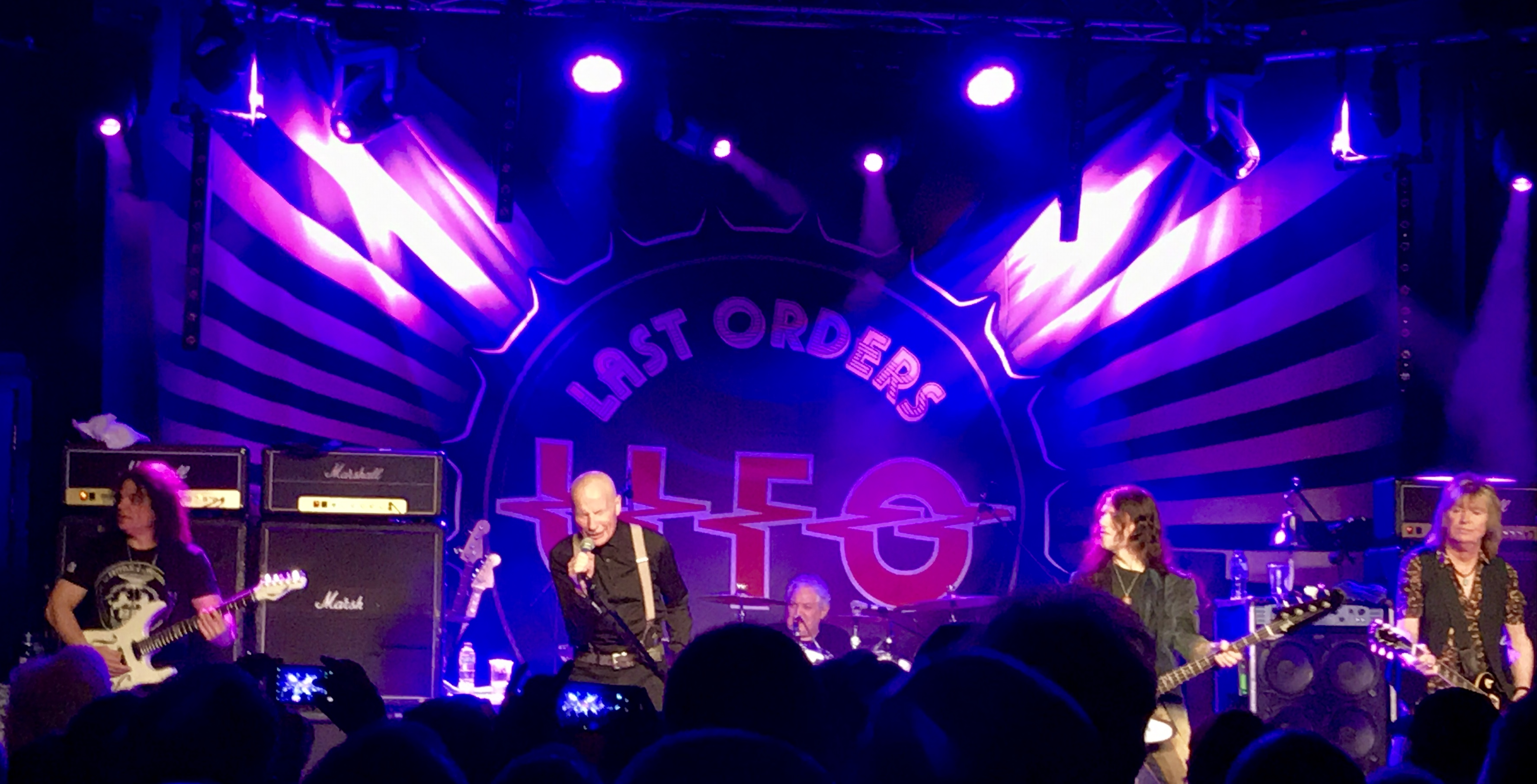
UFO at Cambridge, 22 March 2019. Last Orders Tour.

Longtime keyboardist and guitarist Paul Raymond died from a heart attack on 13 April 2019 at the age of 73. Two weeks later, it was announced that Raymond's initial replacement Neil Carter would be rejoining UFO for the remainder of the band's final tour. Former guitarist Paul Chapman died on his 66th birthday on 9 June 2020. Chapman was followed two months later by original bassist Pete Way, who died from accident injuries at the age of 69.

In late August 2022, Mogg suffered a heart attack. On 1 September 2022 doctors pronounced a strict performance ban for Mogg, after having performed several detailed examinations in the previous days. This resulted in the farewell tour, which was set to occur across Europe in October 2022, being cancelled.

When asked in April 2024 by Ultimate Classic Rock about the future of UFO, Mogg said, "I think it's come to a conclusion. We did that last U.K. tour in 2019, just before COVID. So that was kind of the end of it and the time was right."

== Members ==
Final lineup

- Phil Mogg – lead vocals (1968–1983, 1984–1989, 1991–1998, 2000, 2002–2003, 2003–2024)
- Andy Parker – drums (1969–1983, 1988, 1993–1995, 2005–2024)
- Neil Carter – keyboards, rhythm guitar, backing vocals (1980–1983, 2019–2024); saxophone (1981)
- Vinnie Moore – lead guitar (2003–2024)
- Rob De Luca – bass guitar, backing vocals (2008–2024)

== Discography ==
- UFO 1 (1970)
- UFO 2: Flying (1971)
- Phenomenon (1974)
- Force It (1975)
- No Heavy Petting (1976)
- Lights Out (1977)
- Obsession (1978)
- No Place to Run (1980)
- The Wild, the Willing and the Innocent (1981)
- Mechanix (1982)
- Making Contact (1983)
- Misdemeanor (1985)
- Ain't Misbehavin' (1988)
- High Stakes & Dangerous Men (1992)
- Walk on Water (1995)
- Covenant (2000)
- Sharks (2002)
- You Are Here (2004)
- The Monkey Puzzle (2006)
- The Visitor (2009)
- Seven Deadly (2012)
- A Conspiracy of Stars (2015)
- The Salentino Cuts (2017)
