= Mind's Eye (album) =

- Cover art by Guy Aitchison

Studio album by Vinnie Moore
- Released: 1986
- Recorded: August 1986
- Studios: Prairie Sun, Cotati, California
- Genres: Instrumental rock, neoclassical metal
- Length: 43:00
- Label: Shrapnel
- Producers: Mike Varney, Steve Fontano

Vinnie Moore chronology
Mind's Eye (1986)	Time Odyssey (1988)

Mind's Eye is the debut studio album by guitarist Vinnie Moore, released in 1986 through Shrapnel Records. Recorded in eleven days when Moore was 21 years old, the album was ranked third on the all-time top ten list of shred albums in a 2009 article by Guitar World magazine.

== Critical reception ==
Professional ratings
Review scores
Source	Rating
AllMusic	4/5 stars
Collector's Guide to Heavy Metal	6/10

Robert Taylor at AllMusic gave Mind's Eye four stars out of five, calling it "a classic in the shredder community", albeit "just a display of technical ability to the casual listener." Praise was given to Moore for being "one of the more interesting of the shredders", but Taylor also labeled him as an Yngwie Malmsteen clone. "In Control" and "Saved by a Miracle" were listed as highlights. Canadian journalist Martin Popoff called the album "a mature, triumphant, very professional record" and lauded the musicians and Mike Varney's production.

== Track listing ==
All music is composed by Vinnie Moore.

Side one
No.	Title	Length
1.	"In Control"	4:38
2.	"Daydream"	4:31
3.	"Saved by a Miracle"	5:19
4.	"Hero Without Honor"	7:19

Side two
No.	Title	Length
5.	"Lifeforce"	4:02
6.	"N.N.Y."	3:43
7.	"Mind's Eye"	3:28
8.	"Shadows of Yesterday"	4:34
9.	"The Journey"	5:26
Total length:		43:00

== Personnel ==
Musicians

- Vinnie Moore – guitar
- Tony MacAlpine – keyboards
- Andy West – bass
- Tommy Aldridge – drums

Production

- Mike Varney – producer
- Steve Fontano – engineer, producer
- Dino Alden – assistant engineer
- George Horn – mastering
