= Sharks (album) =

Studio album by UFO
- Released: 3 September 2002
- Recorded: 2002
- Studios: Prairie Sun Recording Studios, Cotati, California
- Genres: Hard rock, heavy metal
- Length: 49:36
- Label: Shrapnel
- Producers: Mike Varney, Steve Fontano

UFO chronology
Covenant (2000)	Sharks (2002)	You Are Here (2004)

Professional ratings
Review scores
Source	Rating
AllMusic	3/5 stars
The Encyclopedia of Popular Music	2/5 stars

Sharks is the sixteenth album by the British hard rock band UFO, released in September 2002. It is the last album to feature longtime German lead guitarist Michael Schenker.

== Track listing ==
No.	Title	Writer(s)	Length
1.	"Outlaw Man"	Mogg, Way	4:03
2.	"Quicksilver Rider"	Schenker, Mogg	4:09
3.	"Serenity"	Schenker, Mogg	6:24
4.	"Deadman Walking"	Schenker, Mogg	4:33
5.	"Shadow Dancer"	Schenker, Mogg, Fontano	4:48
6.	"Someone's Gonna Have to Pay"	Mogg, Way	5:31
7.	"Sea of Faith"	Schenker, Mogg, Fontano	5:51
8.	"Fighting Man"	Mogg, Way	4:32
9.	"Perfect View"	Schenker, Mogg, Fontano	4:08
10.	"Crossing Over"	Schenker, Mogg	4:49
11.	"Hawaii"	Schenker	0:43
Total length:			49:36

There are reports of an unofficial Russian 18 track version of this CD, with tracks from previous UFO albums but not listed in the cover.

=== Japan edition bonus tracks ===
1. "Only You Can Rock Me" (Live)
2. "Too Hot to Handle" (Live)
3. "Rock Bottom" (Live)

== Personnel ==
Band members

- Phil Mogg – vocals
- Michael Schenker – guitar
- Pete Way – bass guitar
- Aynsley Dunbar – drums

Additional musicians

- Mike Varney – guitar fills & outro guitar solo on "Fighting Man", producer
- Kevin Carlson – keyboards
- Jesse Bradman – background vocals
- Luis Maldonado – background vocals

Production

- Steve Fontano – producer, engineer, mixing, mastering
- Jason D'Ottavio, John Anaya – assistant engineers
- Tim Gennert – mastering

== Charts ==
Chart (2002)	Peak position
German Albums (Offizielle Top 100)	75
