= Rob De Luca =

American musician

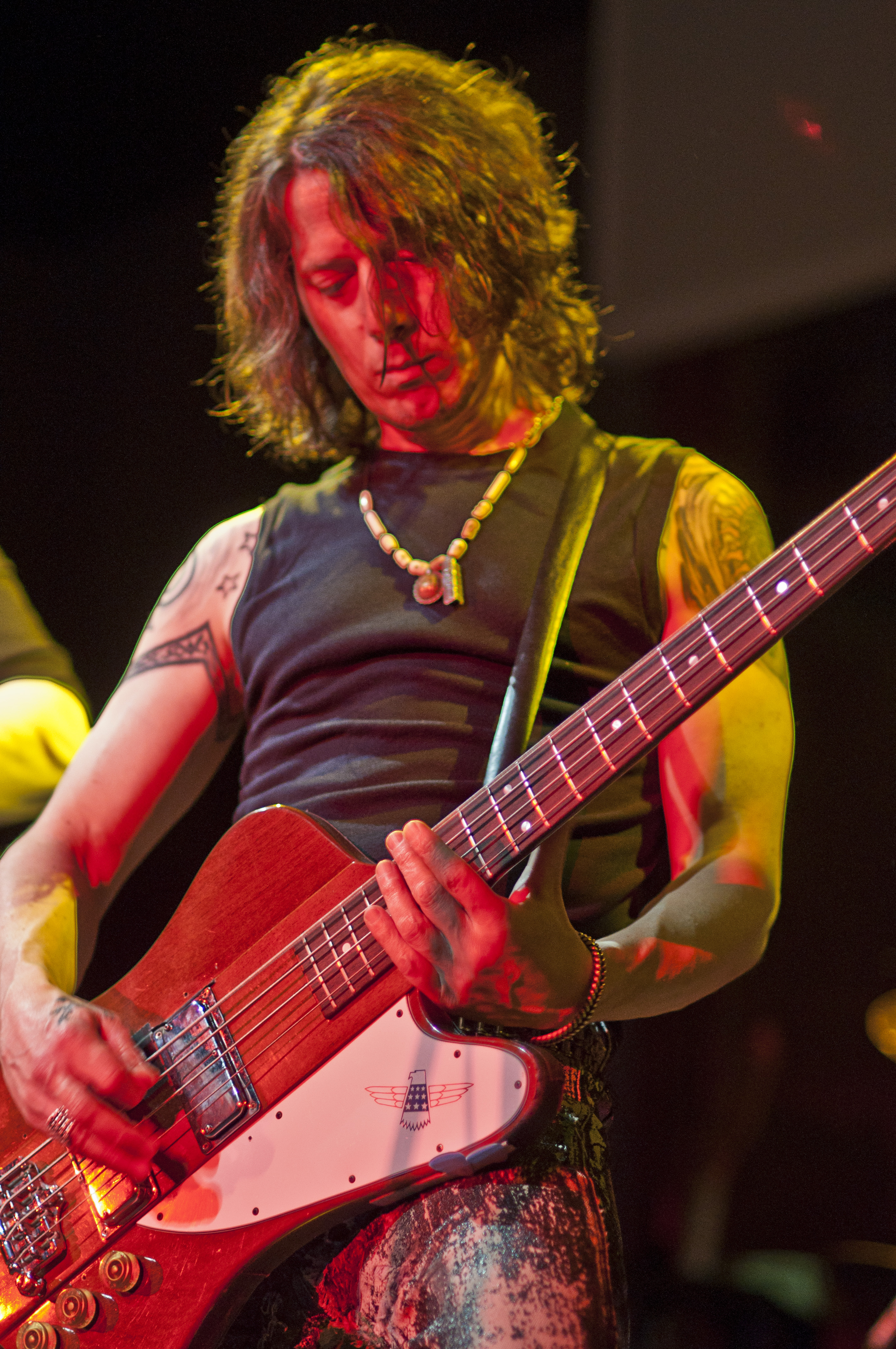
- De Luca in 2011

Background information
- Genres: Hard rock, glam metal, heavy metal
- Occupations: Musician, songwriter, producer
- Instruments: Bass, vocals
- Years active: 1989–present
- Member of: Spread Eagle, Sebastian Bach, Of Earth
- Formerly of: UFO

Rob De Luca is an American bassist and vocalist, best known for playing in UFO and as a founding member of Spread Eagle. He has also toured with Sebastian Bach, Joan Jett and the Blackhearts, Of Earth and Helmet.

== Early years ==
De Luca started playing guitar at the age of 15. He first played bass in a band called Bang. When the members of Bang met vocalist Ray West, Spread Eagle was born.

== Spread Eagle ==
Spread Eagle formed in 1989 and after just a few months of rehearsals, they signed a record deal with MCA/Universal Records. They have released four albums: their debut, Spread Eagle (1990), Open to the Public (1993), Subway to the Stars (2019) and The Brutal Divine (2026). The debut album was recently voted as one of the top 20 glam albums of all time (along with Guns N' Roses, Mötley Crüe, Hanoi Rocks, and Skid Row). In 2006, a remastered version of the album was released via Lovember Records.

Despite being quite popular among their fans, they never achieved major commercial success and disbanded around 1995. Spread Eagle reunited in 2006 and are currently together and touring. In January 2018, the band signed with Frontiers SRL Records for a 2019 studio album release, produced by De Luca.

== Of Earth ==
Of Earth is a four-piece psychedelic/progressive band from NYC fronted by Rob De Luca on vocals and bass. Their self-titled debut album was mastered by Howie Weinberg and released on February 14, 2010. The album was reviewed by New York Music Daily and referred to as an "Art-Rock Masterpiece". In a 2012 interview with Music Legends, De Luca confirmed that he is working on the follow-up album. On February 21, 2013, Of Earth released the lead off single "Prototype" from their sophomore album The Monarch.

In March 2013, Classic Rock magazine nominated "Prototype" for Track of the Week in a poll that also included David Bowie's song "The Stars (Are Out Tonight)" from his album The Next Day. Of Earth won the competition collecting more than two times as many votes as Bowie, who ranked No. 2. In June 2013 Classic Rock magazine again nominated Of Earth for Track of the Week, this time for the song "Heart of the Hard Drive". Of Earth won for the second straight time, gaining almost one third of all votes and beating Nine Inch Nails, Shinedown, Megadeth and Queensrÿche. In February 2015, Of Earth's song "Sweep the Fire" was chosen as Classic Rock magazine's Track of the Week. The song, from the album The Monarch, marks their third consecutive single being picked as Classic Rock magazine Track of the Week.

== Sebastian Bach, Helmet ==
De Luca joined the Sebastian Bach band in 2005. They have toured worldwide as direct support for Guns N' Roses and as a headliner. In 2006, De Luca did the entire leg of the Guns N' Roses Canadian tour playing bass in both support acts (Sebastian Bach and Helmet). Helmet's previous bassist was refused entry at the Canadian border, so De Luca had four hours to learn their ten-song set before going onstage at Winnipeg's MTS Centre. By the next day at Calgary Saddledome, he already knew their full twelve-song set.

== UFO ==
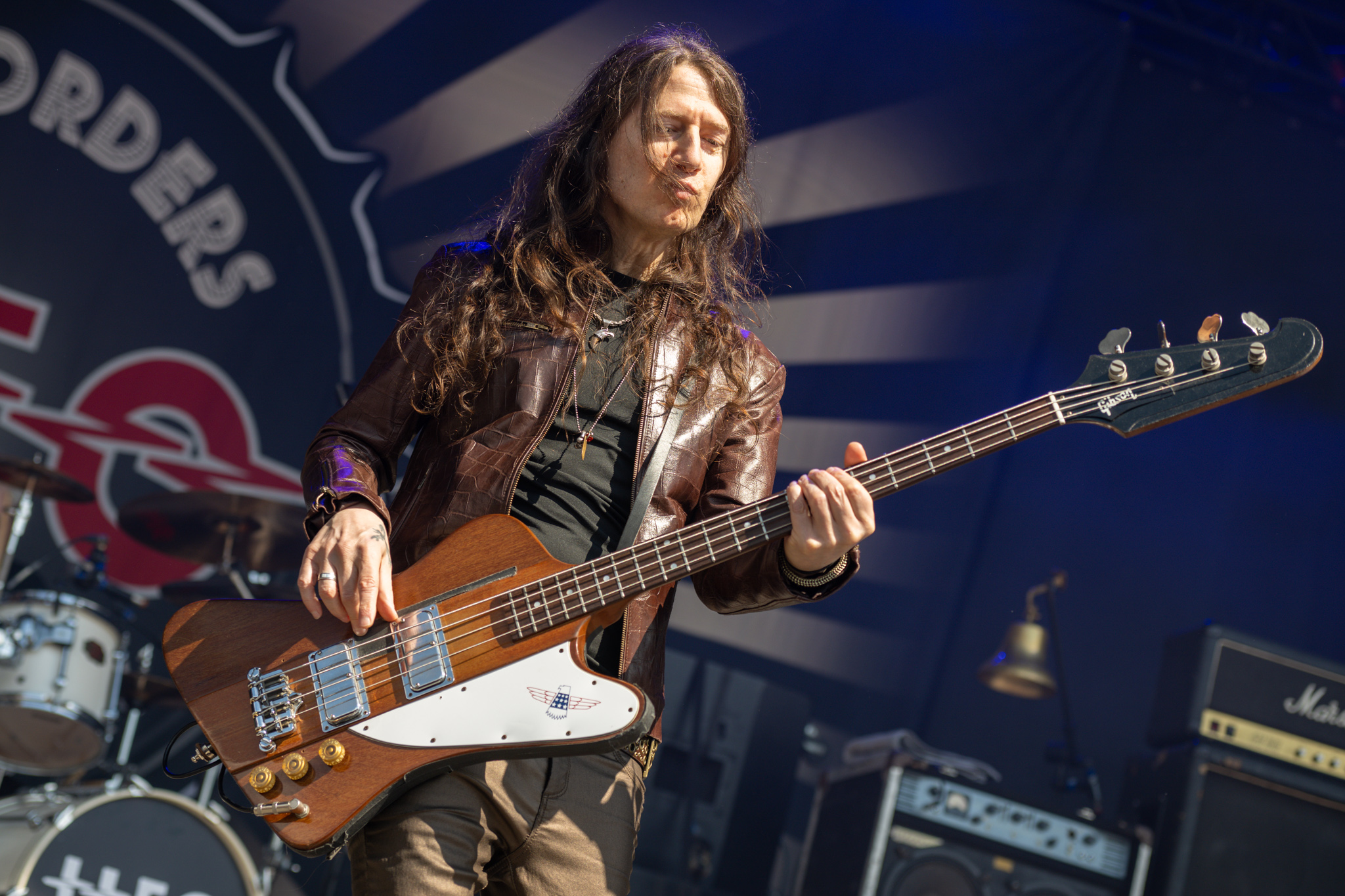
De Luca with UFO in 2022

De Luca was recruited by the British hard rock band UFO in 2008 when former bassist Pete Way was unable to get his U.S. work visa. They've since toured worldwide. De Luca joined UFO in the studio recording their acclaimed 2015 album A Conspiracy Of Stars, also contributing songwriting. On September 29, 2017, UFO released their 22nd studio album, the self produced The Salentino Cuts, including De Luca on bass. De Luca remained in UFO until the band called it quits in April 2024.

== Studio work and additional touring ==
De Luca has recorded for producer Steve Lillywhite and for engineer Tom Camuso. He has also toured and/or recorded with Joan Jett and the Blackhearts, George Lynch (Dokken/Lynch Mob), Vinnie Moore and Mike Chlasciak (Halford).
