= Vinnie Moore =

American guitarist (born 1964)

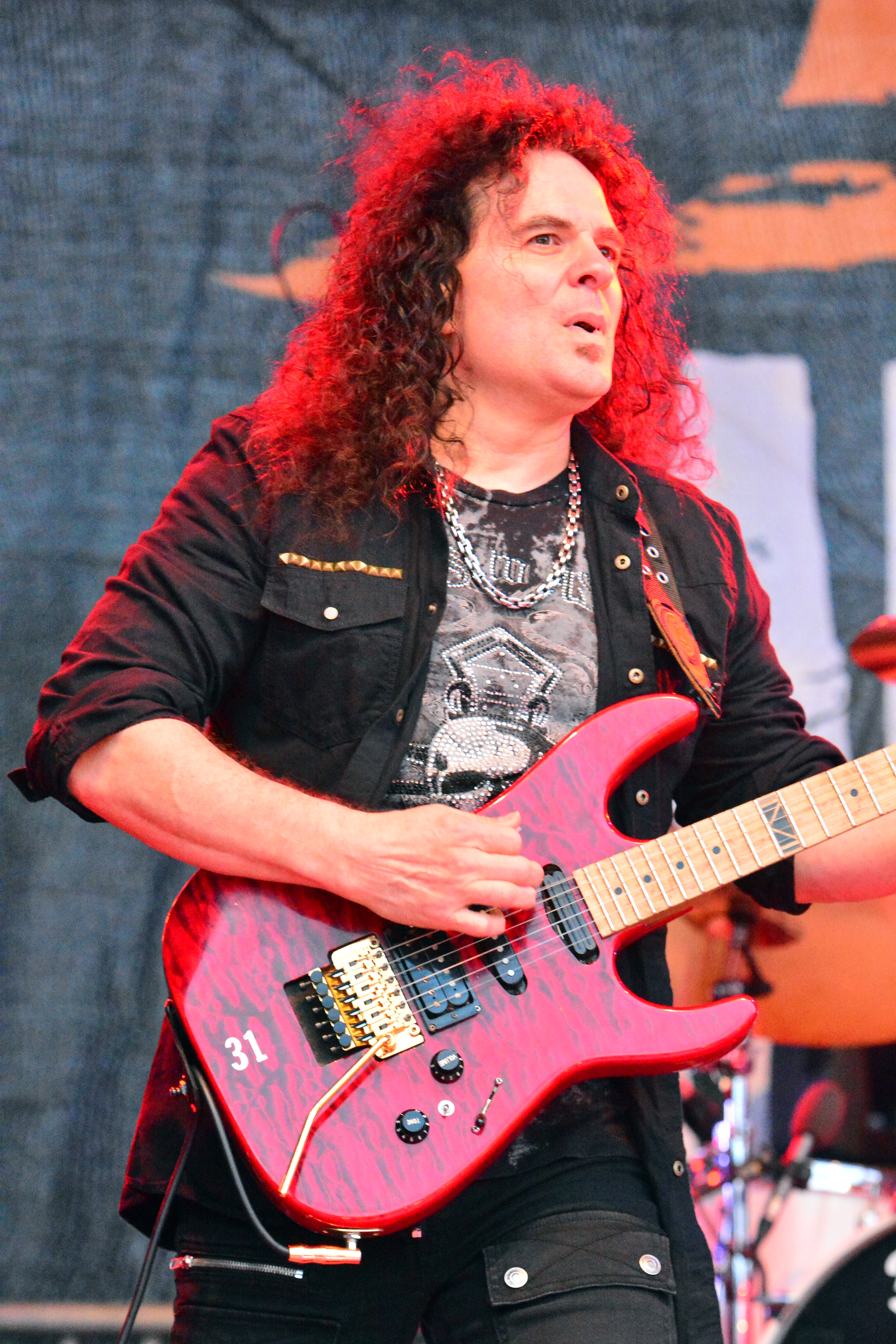
- Moore in 2015

Background information
- Born: Vincent Moore; April 14, 1964 (age 62); New Castle, Delaware, U.S.
- Genres: Neoclassical metal, heavy metal, progressive metal, hard rock, instrumental rock
- Occupation: Guitarist
- Years active: 1984–present
- Label: Shrapnel
- Website: vinniemoore.com

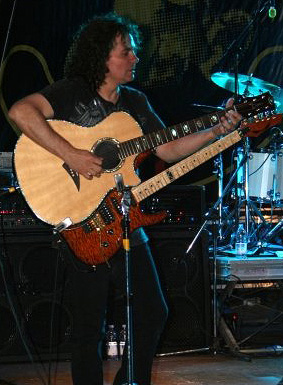
Moore in a concert with UFO in Cercemaggiore

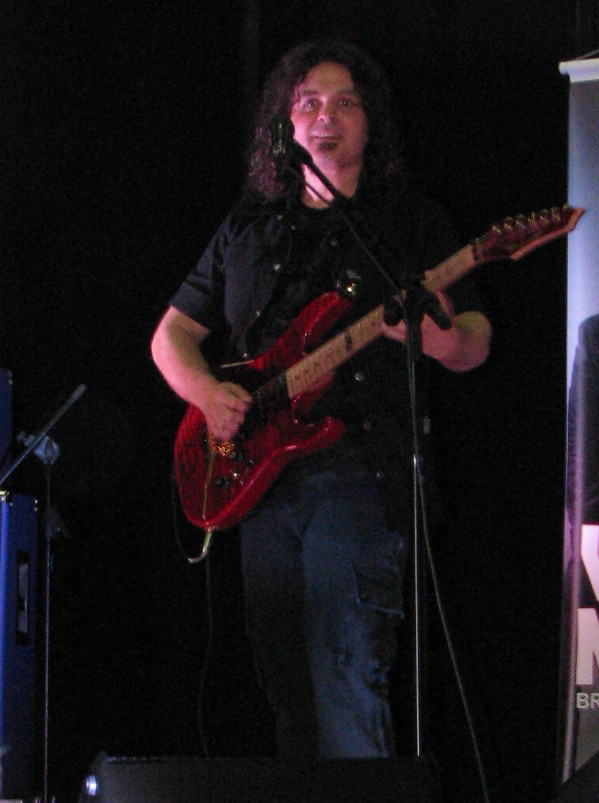
Moore playing in Brusque, Santa Catarina, Brazil, in 2010

Vincent Moore (born April 14, 1964) is an American guitarist and a former member of the British hard rock band UFO.

== Biography ==
Moore was born in New Castle, Delaware. He began his professional career at age 12 after receiving a guitar as a Christmas present. During a 2018 interview, Moore stated, "I got my first guitar for Christmas when I was like 12, basically just because I saw a picture of a guitar in a catalog, a JCPenney's catalog. I thought, 'Hey that looks pretty cool. I want that.' That was my motivation at the time, and I got it for Christmas, and really didn't bother with it a whole lot. Then, I started taking lessons for the next year. Then I really started to get obsessed with it." During that same interview, Moore was asked who his earliest teachers were, and he stated, "The first teacher was Mary Biddle, and I studied for a year with her, just some basic lessons at the local music shop. After about a year, I had advanced, and she referred me to another guy named Nick Bucci, a great player in my area. He was studying jazz guitar with Pat Martino, and was also a rock guy, and he just taught me a lot of stuff; theory, and exercises, and all different kinds of stuff to make me become a better player and musician." Moore played clubs and bars until Shrapnel executive Mike Varney discovered him via a demo and biography that Moore submitted to the Spotlight column, which Varney headed for Guitar Player. His connection to Varney led to an opportunity to appear in a Pepsi commercial in 1985 (only Vinnie's hands appeared in the commercial as his guitar playing is heard). Following this, Moore recorded his first solo album, Mind's Eye (1986), released on Shrapnel Records and featuring Tony MacAlpine on keyboards. The album received several awards from guitar magazines and sold over 100,000 copies.

Moore played lead guitar with the heavy metal band Vicious Rumors on their debut album, Soldiers of the Night (1985). The album featured Moore's solo-song "Invader", which was in the style of Van Halen's "Eruption". The shred guitar craze of the late 1980s led to more releases for Shrapnel. Moore also began performing with other hard rock and heavy metal bands.

Moore joined Alice Cooper's band for a tour and then appeared on the Hey Stoopid (1991) album. Moore released two instructional videos on guitar playing, in 1987 and 1989.

Moore had been the lead guitarist of UFO for 21 years, joining in June 2003 and remaining until their breakup in April 2024. He performed on six studio albums with the band: You Are Here (2004), The Monkey Puzzle (2006), The Visitor (2009), Seven Deadly (2012), A Conspiracy of Stars (2015) and the covers album The Salentino Cuts (2017).

On August 5, 2013, Moore came on stage to perform live with Peter Frampton on Frampton's Guitar Circus concert at Musikfest in Bethlehem, Pennsylvania.

Moore played guitar on Red Zone Rider's debut album Red Zone Rider released on September 16, 2014.

== Equipment ==
Moore currently endorses Kramer guitars. He was previously sponsored by Dean guitars, who produced several Vinnie Moore signature models for their instrument lineup. Prior to his endorsement of Dean, he played various other guitar brands over the years, including Ibanez and Fender, most notably the Talon model, manufactured by Heartfield, a Fender subsidiary. Moore also currently uses ENGL amplifiers and DiMarzio pickups.

== Discography ==
=== Discography ===
Title	Album details	Peak chart positions	Sales
Title	Album details	US	Sales
Mind's Eye	Released: 1986; Label: Shrapnel Records; Formats: CD, CS, LP, DL	–	US: 6,719+
Time Odyssey	Released: 1988; Label: PolyGram; Formats: CD, LP	147	US: 12,101+
Meltdown	Released: 1991; Label: Relativity; Formats: CD, CS, LP	–	US: 49,661+
Out of Nowhere	Released: April 16, 1996; Label: Mayhem; Formats: CD	–	US: 6,777+
The Maze	Released: March 23, 1999; Label: Shrapnel Records; Formats: CD, DL	–	US: 5,852+
Defying Gravity	Released: July 10, 2001; Label: Shrapnel Records; Formats: CD, DL	–	
To the Core	Released: May 26, 2009; Label: Mascot; Formats: CD, DL	–	
Aerial Visions	Released: October 23, 2015; Label: Mind's Eye Music; Formats: Digital, CD	–	
Soul Shifter	Released: October 4, 2019; Label: Mind's Eye Music; Formats: Digital, CD	–	
Double exposure	Released: November 8, 2022; Label: Mind's Eye Music; Formats:	–	
"—" denotes a recording that did not chart or was not released in that territory.

=== Compilation albums ===
Title	Album details
Collection: The Shrapnel Years	Released: March 14, 2006; Label: Shrapnel Records; Formats: CD, DL

=== Live albums ===
Title	Album details
Live!	Released: January 25, 2000; Label: Shrapnel Records; Formats: CD, DL

=== Instructional videos ===
Title	Album details
Advanced Lead Guitar Techniques	Released: 1987; Label: Hot Licks; Formats: VHS
Speed, Accuracy, & Articulation	Released: 1989; Label: Hot Licks; Formats: VHS

=== Other appearances ===
Title	Year	Notes
Vicious Rumors – Soldiers of the Night	1985	band member
Alice Cooper – Hey Stoopid	1991	band member
UFO – You Are Here	2004	band member
Jordan Rudess – Rhythm of Time	2004	guest
UFO – Showtime	2005	band member
UFO – The Monkey Puzzle	2006	band member
Destruction – D.E.V.O.L.U.T.I.O.N.	2008	guest
Michael Angelo Batio – Hands Without Shadows 2 – Voices	2009	guest
UFO – The Visitor	2009	band member
Glen Drover – Metalusion	2011	guest
UFO – Seven Deadly	2012	band member
Red Zone Rider – Red Zone Rider	2014	band member
UFO – A Conspiracy of Stars	2015	band member
UFO – The Salentino Cuts	2017	band member
