= Paul Raymond (musician) =

British rock musician (1945–2019)

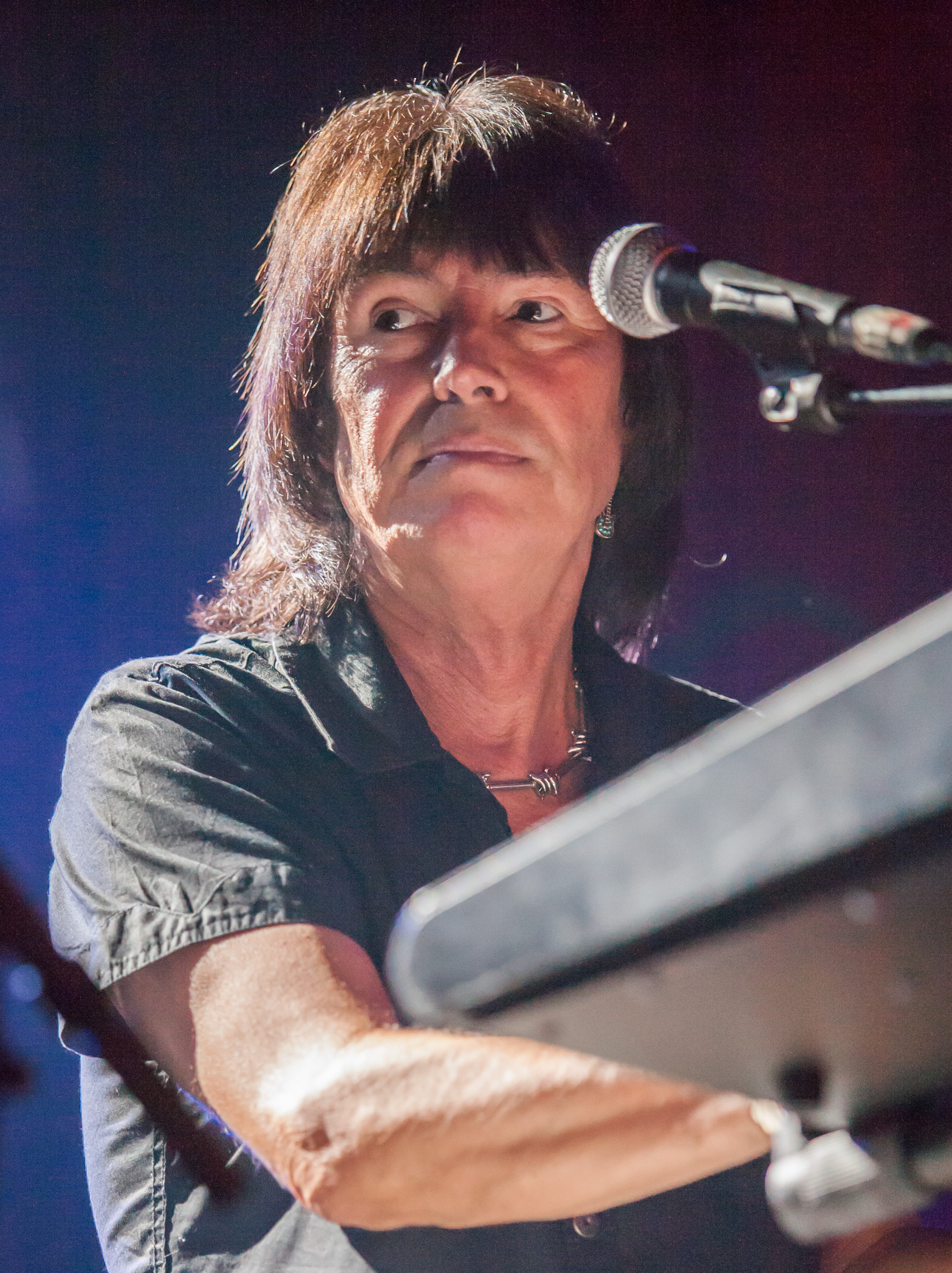
- Raymond in 2007

Background information
- Born: Paul Martin Raymond; 16 November 1945; St Albans, Hertfordshire, England
- Died: 13 April 2019 (aged 73)
- Genres: Rock; hard rock; blues rock
- Occupation: Musician
- Instruments: Keyboards; guitar
- Years active: 1964–2019
- Formerly of: Plastic Penny; Chicken Shack; Savoy Brown; UFO; Michael Schenker Group; Waysted; Paul Raymond Project; Tony Jackson and The Vibrations
- Website: paulraymondmusic.com

Paul Martin Raymond (16 November 1945 – 13 April 2019) was an English keyboardist and guitarist, best known for playing in the rock bands Savoy Brown, UFO and Michael Schenker Group. He also replaced Christine McVie when she left Chicken Shack to join Fleetwood Mac in 1969.

== Career ==
=== Early career ===
Raymond began his musical career in January 1964 as a jazz musician. His first professional group was also in 1964, as a member of Tony Jackson and The Vibrations, a group formed by Tony Jackson of The Searchers when he left in mid 1964.

He later joined Plastic Penny as their keyboardist/vocalist, and replaced Christine McVie (née Perfect) in the British blues band Chicken Shack when she left for a solo career, before she joined Fleetwood Mac. Raymond then joined Savoy Brown as their keyboardist/guitarist.

=== UFO ===
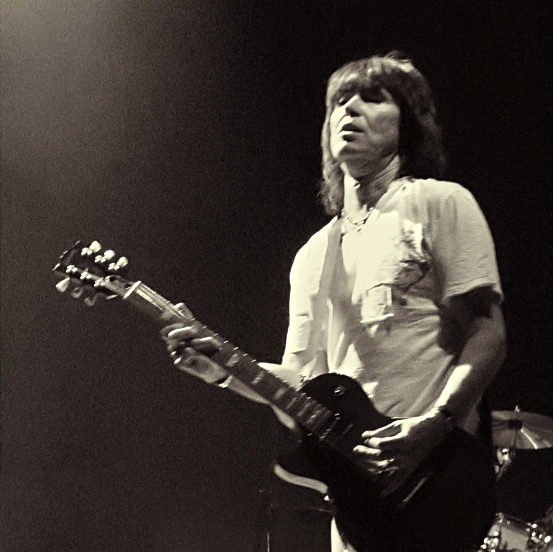
Raymond performing with UFO, unknown date

Raymond was recruited by UFO in 1976 to replace their first keyboardist, Danny Peyronel. He wrote songs for UFO, but because of a previous publishing deal, was not credited for these songs until recent years. When Michael Schenker left UFO, Raymond joined Schenker's new band, MSG, in 1981 and later joined UFO bassist Pete Way's band, Waysted, in 1983.

Raymond worked with Phil Mogg, Andy Parker, along with Schenker and Way, in UFO from 1976–1980, 1984–1986, 1993–1998, and 2003–2019.

At the time of his death in 2019, UFO had just completed the first leg of what they referred to as their final world tour, dubbed "Last Orders: 50th Anniversary". For the remainder of the tour, Raymond was replaced by Neil Carter, who was also his replacement from 1980 to 1983.

=== Other works ===
He subsequently recorded with the former Fleetwood Mac guitarist Danny Kirwan, appearing on his first album, Second Chapter, released in 1975.

Raymond frequently toured with his own group, Paul Raymond Project.

== Death ==
Raymond died from a heart attack on 13 April 2019, aged 73.

== Career timeline ==
- Tony Jackson and The Vibrations – 1964–1967
- Plastic Penny – 1967–1969
- Chicken Shack – 1969–1971
- Savoy Brown – 1970–1973, 1974–1976
- UFO – 1976–1980, 1984–1986, 1993–1998, 2003–2019
- Michael Schenker Group – 1980–1982
- Waysted – 1982–1984
