= UFO discography =

- Studio albums: 22
- Extended plays: 1
- Live albums: 17
- Compilation albums: 16
- Singles: 12
- Video albums: 2

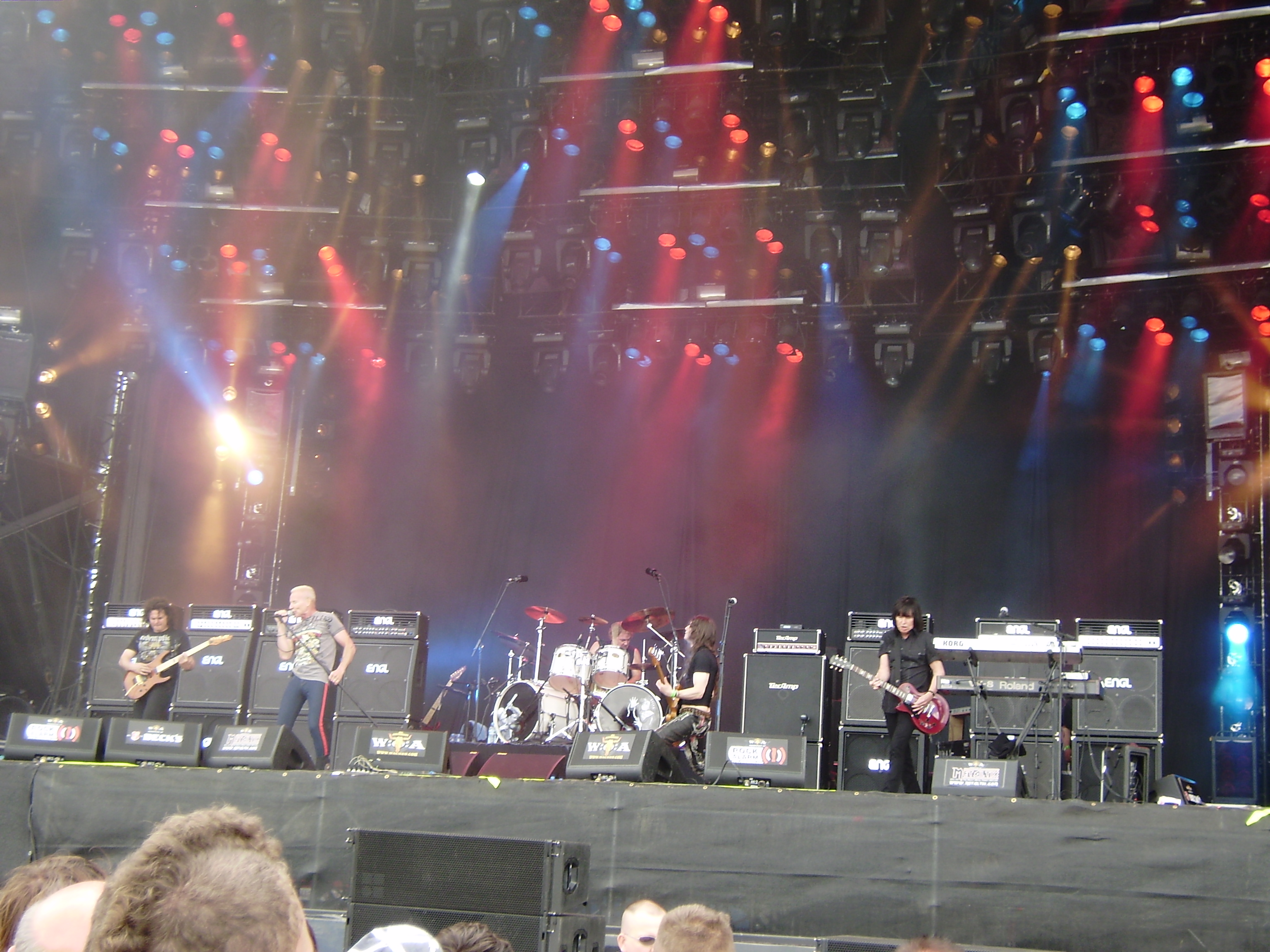
UFO, live at the Wacken Open Air festival in 2009

The following is a comprehensive discography of UFO, an English hard rock band formed in 1968. The band became a transitional band between early hard rock and heavy metal and the new wave of British heavy metal. UFO's influence was strongly felt in the 1980s heavy metal scene and they have been cited as a primary influence of Steve Harris of Iron Maiden, Kirk Hammett of Metallica, Dave Mustaine of Megadeth, Joey Tempest of Europe, Frank Hannon of Tesla, and Mike McCready of Pearl Jam, among others.

== Albums ==
=== Studio albums ===
Title	Album details	Peak chart positions								Certifications
Title	Album details	CAN	US	GER	SWE	SWI	UK	UK Rock	AUS	Certifications
UFO 1	Released: October 1970; Label: Beacon	—	—	—	—	—	—	—	—	
UFO 2: Flying	Released: October 1971; Label: Beacon	—	—	—	—	—	—	—	—	
Phenomenon	Released: May 1974; Label: Chrysalis	—	202	—	—	—	—	—	76	
Force It	Released: July 1975; Label: Chrysalis	—	71	35	—	—	—	—	—	
No Heavy Petting	Released: May 1976; Label: Chrysalis	—	169	—	38	—	—	—	—	
Lights Out	Released: May 1977; Label: Chrysalis	—	23	—	31	—	54	—	—	
Obsession	Released: June 1978; Label: Chrysalis	68	41	—	31	—	26	—	89	
No Place to Run	Released: January 1980; Label: Chrysalis	91	51	—	44	—	11	—	—	UK: Silver
The Wild, the Willing and the Innocent	Released: January 16, 1981; Label: Chrysalis	—	77	—	27	—	19	—	—	
Mechanix	Released: February 1982; Label: Chrysalis	—	82	—	38	—	8	—	—	
Making Contact	Released: January 1983; Label: Chrysalis	97	153	—	35	—	32	—	—	
Misdemeanor	Released: November 4, 1985; Label: Chrysalis	—	106	—	—	—	74	—	—	
High Stakes & Dangerous Men	Released: February 1992; Label: Castle	—	—	—	—	—	—	—	—	
Walk on Water	Released: April 14, 1995; Label: Zero Corporation	—	—	—	—	—	—	16	—	
Covenant	Released: July 25, 2000; Label: Shrapnel	—	—	53	—	—	—	20	—	
Sharks	Released: September 3, 2002; Label: Shrapnel	—	—	75	—	—	—	—	—	
You Are Here	Released: March 16, 2004; Label: SPV/Steamhammer	—	—	—	—	—	—	—	—	
The Monkey Puzzle	Released: September 25, 2006; Label: SPV/Steamhammer	—	—	—	—	—	—	20	—	
The Visitor	Released: June 2, 2009; Label: SPV/Steamhammer	—	—	86	—	—	99	4	—	
Seven Deadly	Released: February 27, 2012; Label: SPV/Steamhammer	—	—	55	59	—	63	1	—	
A Conspiracy of Stars	Released: February 25, 2015; Label: SPV/Steamhammer	—	—	28	—	72	50	6	—	
The Salentino Cuts	Released: September 29, 2017; Label: Cleopatra	—	—	—	—	—	—	32	—	
"—" denotes releases that did not chart or were not released in that territory.

=== Live albums ===
Year	Title	Details	Peak chart positions				Certifications
Year	Title	Details	US	UK	GER	CAN	Certifications
1971	Live	September 25, 1971 in Tokyo, Japan	—	—	23	—	
1979	Strangers in the Night	Amphitheatre, Chicago and The Gardens, Louisville	42	7	69	48	UK: Silver
1986	Misdemeanor Tour	Oxford, September 1985	—	—	—	—	
1992	Lights Out in Tokyo	Club Citta Kawasaki Japan June 20, 1992	—	—	—	—	
1992	BBC Radio 1 - Live in Concert	Recorded in 1974 and 1980	—	—	—	—	
1993	Heaven's Gate	Oxford, September 1985	—	—	—	—	
1994	T.N.T.	Contains Live in Texas and Lights Out in Tokyo releases	—	—	—	—	
1996	On With the Action	London Roundhouse Sunday 25 April 1976	—	—	—	—	
1998	Werewolves of London	Wolverhampton Civic Hall 10 February 1998	—	—	—	—	
1998	Live on Earth	Vienna, Austria on 28 January 1998. (Released in 2003)	—	—	—	—	
1999	In Session and Live in Concert (BBC Music - The Archive Series)	BBC recordings from 28/10/74, 27/6/77, 6/6/74 and 11/12/75	—	—	—	—	
2000	Live in Texas	Midland TX 21 March 1979	—	—	—	—	
2001	Regenerator – Live 1982	Hammersmith Odeon, London, January 1982	—	—	—	—	
2005	Showtime	Pumpwerk, Wilhelshaven Germany 13 May 2005	—	—	—	—	
2005	Classic Airwaves - The Best of UFO Broadcasting Live	Reissue of Record Plant Los Angeles 1975	—	—	—	—	
2008	Impact Live	3-CD box set containing Werewolves of London and Live at the Record Plant NYC 1975	—	—	—	—	
2009	Official Bootleg Box Set 1975-1982	6-CD box set of various concerts from 1975 to 1982	—	—	—	—	
2009	Headstone Live at Hammersmith 1983	Hammersmith Odeon 15 April 1983	—	—	—	—	
2010	Hardrock Legends Vol. 1	Westfalenhalle Dortmund Germany 29 November 1980	—	—	—	—	
2013	UFO at the BBC ON AIR 1974-1985	CD + DVD box set of various BBC broadcasts from 1974 to 1985	—	—	—	—	
2013	Hot 'N' Live - The Chrysalis Live Anthology 1974-1983	2-CD compilation of live recordings from 1974 to 1983	—	—	—	—	
2015	Live at Rockpalast	CD + DVD combo Westfalenhalle Dortmund Germany 29 November 1980	—	—	—	—	
2016	Live Sightings	Deluxe 4-CD box set of early 1980s performances	—	—	—	—	
2020	Strangers in the Night (Deluxe Edition) Box Set	Deluxe 8-CD box set includes all 6 complete original concerts of that Tour	—	—	—	—	
2020	Live In Youngstown 1978	2 x Vinyl LP Album, Record Store Day, Limited Edition. Tomorrow Club, Youngstown, Ohio, October 15, 1978	—	—	—	—	
2022	Werewolves of London	2-CD set recorded at Wolverhampton Civic Hall February 10, 1998	—	—	—	—	
2022	Cleveland 1982	Recorded at The Agoura Ballroom Cleveland June 9, 1982	—	—	—	—	
2023	Hollywood '76	Recorded at the Starwood, Los Angeles, California May 3, 1976	—	—	—	—	
2023	Lights Out In Babenhausen 93	CD release + 2 x Colored Vinyl LP Album, recorded at the Stadhalle, Babenhausen, Hesse December 12, 1993	—	—	—	—	
2023	Live At The Oxford Apollo 1985	CD release + 1 x Green Vinyl LP Album, recorded at the Apollo, Oxford, England, on November 28, 1985	—	—	—	—	

=== Compilation albums ===
Year	Title
1976	Space Metal
1981	C'mon Everybody (Telefunken/Teldec)
1983	Headstone: The Best of UFO
1985	The Collection
1986	Anthology
1988	The Best of the Rest
1992	Essential UFO
1993	The Decca Years
1996	The Best of UFO: Gold Collection
1997	X-Factor: Out There & Back
1998	Time To Rock: Best of Singles A's & B's
2002	The Best of UFO: Ten Best Series
2003	Then and Now
2004	Flying: The Early Years 1970–1973
2006	An Introduction to UFO
2006	One of Those Nights: The Collection
2007	Live Throughout the Years
2007	Classic Studio Recordings and Essential Live Hits
2008	The Best of UFO (1974–1983)
2010	The Best of a Decade
2011	All the Hits & More: The Early Days
2011	The Chrysalis Years: 1973–1979
2012	Too Hot to Handle: The Very Best of UFO
2012	The Chrysalis Years: 1980–1986
2012	The Decca Years: Best of 1970-1973
2014	The Complete Studio Albums 1974-1986
2019	Will the Last Man Standing (Turn Out the Light): The Best Of UFO

== Extended plays ==
Year	Album details
1988	Ain't Misbehavin': Released: 28 March 1988; Label: FM/Revolver

== Singles ==
Year	Title	UK	AUS	GER	US Rock	Album
1970	"Shake It About" (Note: Released in the UK only)	—	—	—	x	UFO 1
1970	"Come Away Melinda"	—	—	—	x	UFO 1
1970	"Boogie For George"	—	—	30	x	UFO 1
1970	"C'mon Everybody"	—	—	—	x	UFO 1
1971	"Prince Kajuku"	—	—	26	x	UFO 2
1972	"Galactic Love" (Note: Released in Germany)	—	—	—	x	non-LP singles
1973	"Give Her the Gun"	—	—	—	x	non-LP singles
1974	"Doctor Doctor"	—	97	—	x	Phenomenon
1975	"Shoot, Shoot" (Note: Released in EU)	—	—	—	x	Force It
1976	"Can You Roll Her" (Note: Released in Japan)	—	—	—	x	No Heavy Petting
1976	"Highway Lady"	—	—	—	x	No Heavy Petting
1977	"Alone Again Or"	—	—	—	x	Lights Out
1977	"Too Hot to Handle"	—	—	—	x	Lights Out
1977	"Try Me" (Note: Released in the US/Canada)	—	—	—	x	Lights Out
1978	"Cherry"	—	—	—	x	Obsession
1978	"Only You Can Rock Me"	50	—	—	x	Obsession
1978	"Born to Lose" (Note: Released in the Netherlands)	—	—	—	x	Obsession
1979	"Doctor Doctor" (Live)	35	—	—	x	Strangers in the Night
1979	"Shoot Shoot" (Live)	48	—	—	x	Strangers in the Night
1980	"Young Blood"	36	—	—	x	No Place to Run
1980	"Couldn't Get It Right"	—	—	—	x	The Wild, the Willing and the Innocent
1981	"Lonely Heart"	41	—	—	—	The Wild, the Willing and the Innocent
1982	"Let It Rain"	62	—	—	—	Mechanix
1982	"The Writer" [airplay]	—	—	—	23	Mechanix
1982	"Back Into My Life"	—	—	—	—	Mechanix
1983	"When It's Time to Rock"	70	—	—	—	Making Contact
1985	"This Time"	—	—	—	47	Misdemeanor
1986	"Night Run" (US Remix)	94	—	—	—	Misdemeanor
1991	"One of Those Nights"	—	—	—	—	High Stakes & Dangerous Men
2013	Live 'N' Ready EP	—	—	—	—	
2013	"Wonderland"	—	—	—	—	Seven Deadly
2024	"Ain't Misbehavin"	—	—	—	—	
"—" denotes releases that failed to chart | "x" denotes that the chart did not exist at the time.

== Videos ==
1985	The Misdemeanour Tour - Live: Format: VHS
1992	Too Hot to Handle - The Story of UFO: Format: VHS
2005	Showtime: Format: DVD
2010	Live at Rockpalast: Format: DVD
