= The Essential UFO =

Greatest hits album by UFO
- Released: 19 October 1992
- Genre: Hard rock, heavy metal
- Length: 72:32
- Label: Chrysalis / EMI

UFO chronology
High Stakes & Dangerous Men (1992)	The Essential UFO (1992)	Lights Out in Tokyo (1992)

Professional ratings
Review scores
Source	Rating
AllMusic	4/5 stars
The Encyclopedia of Popular Music	4/5 stars

The Essential UFO is a greatest hits album by UFO, released in 1992. This compilation covers the classic Michael Schenker era from 1974–79, with tracks from Phenomenon, Force It, No Heavy Petting, Lights Out, Obsession, and the live Strangers in the Night. The tracks are arranged almost completely chronologically, except the Obsession ('78) tracks are programmed before the Lights Out ('77) tracks. Every track of Strangers In The Night is included on this compilation, either in studio or live form (everything except tracks 8–10).

== Track listing ==
All tracks are the original studio recordings unless stated otherwise.

1. "Doctor Doctor" (Michael Schenker, Phil Mogg) – 4:07 (from the album Phenomenon)
2. "Rock Bottom" (Schenker, Mogg) – 6:30 (from the album Phenomenon)
3. "Out in the Street" (Pete Way, Mogg) – 5:10 (from the album Force It)
4. "Mother Mary" (Schenker, Mogg, Way, Parker) – 3:45 (from the album Force It)
5. "Natural Thing" (Schenker, Mogg, Way) – 4:00 (from the album No Heavy Petting)
6. "I'm a Loser" (Schenker, Mogg) – 3:48 (from the album No Heavy Petting)
7. "Only You Can Rock Me" (Mogg, Schenker, Way) – 4:05 (from the album Obsession)
8. "Lookin' Out for No. 1" (Mogg, Way) – 4:32 (from the album Obsession)
9. "Cherry" (Mogg, Way) – 3:32 (from the album Obsession)
10. "Born to Lose" (Mogg, Schenker, Way) – 3:33 (from the album Obsession)
11. "Too Hot to Handle" (Mogg, Way) – 3:37 (from the album Lights Out)
12. "Lights Out" (Mogg, Andy Parker, Schenker, Way) – 4:31 (from the album Lights Out)
13. "Love to Love" (Mogg, Schenker) – 7:36 (from the album Lights Out)
14. "This Kid's" (Schenker, Mogg) – 4:50 (from the live album Strangers in the Night)
15. "Let It Roll" (Schenker, Mogg) – 4:51 (from the live album Strangers in the Night)
16. "Shoot Shoot" (Schenker, Way, Parker, Mogg) – 4:05 (from the live album Strangers in the Night)
