= Anthology (UFO album) =

Compilation album by UFO
- Released: 11 November 1986
- Recorded: 1973–1983
- Genre: Hard rock, heavy metal
- Length: 57:54
- Label: Castle Communications

UFO chronology
Misdemeanor (1985)	Anthology (1986)	Ain't Misbehavin' (1988)

Professional ratings
Review scores
Source	Rating
AllMusic	4/5 stars
The Encyclopedia of Popular Music	3/5 stars

Anthology is a greatest hits collection by the British hard rock band UFO, released in 1986. It was published by Castle Communications, under licence from Chrysalis Records, the band's original label.

== Track listing ==
1. "Rock Bottom" – 6:27 (from the album Phenomenon)
2. "Built for Comfort" – 3:00 (from the album Phenomenon)
3. "Highway Lady" – 3:46 (from the album No Heavy Petting)
4. "Can You Roll Her" – 2:56 (from the album No Heavy Petting)
5. "A Fool for Love" – 3:52 (from the album Making Contact)
6. "Shoot Shoot" – 3:57 (from the album Force It)
7. "Too Hot to Handle" – 3:35 (from the album Lights Out)
8. "Gettin' Ready" – 3:43 (from the album Lights Out)
9. "Only You Can Rock Me" – 4:08 (from the album Obsession)
10. "Looking Out for No. 1" – 4:32 (from the album Obsession)
11. "Something Else" – 3:18 (from the album Mechanix)
12. "Doing It All for You" – 4:55 (from the album Mechanix)
13. "When It's Time to Rock" – 5:20 (from the album Making Contact)
14. "Diesel in the Dust" – 4:25 (from the album Making Contact)
