= The Best Of (UFO album) =

The Best of UFO

Compilation album by UFO
- Released: 2002
- Genre: Hard rock, heavy metal
- Length: 44:39
- Label: EMI Music

Professional ratings
Review scores
Source	Rating
Allmusic	3.5/5 stars

The Best of UFO is a compilation album of the British hard rock band UFO. The album was produced by EMI Music and distributed by CEMA Special Markets as part of the compilation series 'Ten Best Series' in 2002. This 'Ten Best' CD is a compilation of hits originally released on Chrysalis Records, from 1976 through 1980.

== Track listing ==
1. "Lights Out" (live) - 5:06 (from the live album Strangers in the Night)
2. "Only You Can Rock Me" (live) - 4:06 (from the live album Strangers in the Night)
3. "Too Hot to Handle" - 3:37 (from the album Lights Out)
4. "Love to Love" - 7:39 (from the album Lights Out)
5. "Doctor Doctor" - 4:09 (from the album Phenomenon)
6. "Rock Bottom" - 6:29 (from the album Phenomenon)
7. "Lettin' Go" - 3:53 (from the album No Place to Run)
8. "Cherry" - 3:34 (from the album Obsession)
9. "Out in the Street" - 5:12 (from the album Force It)
10. "Mystery Train" - 3:54 (from the album No Place to Run)
