= Pete Way =

British bassist (1950–2020)

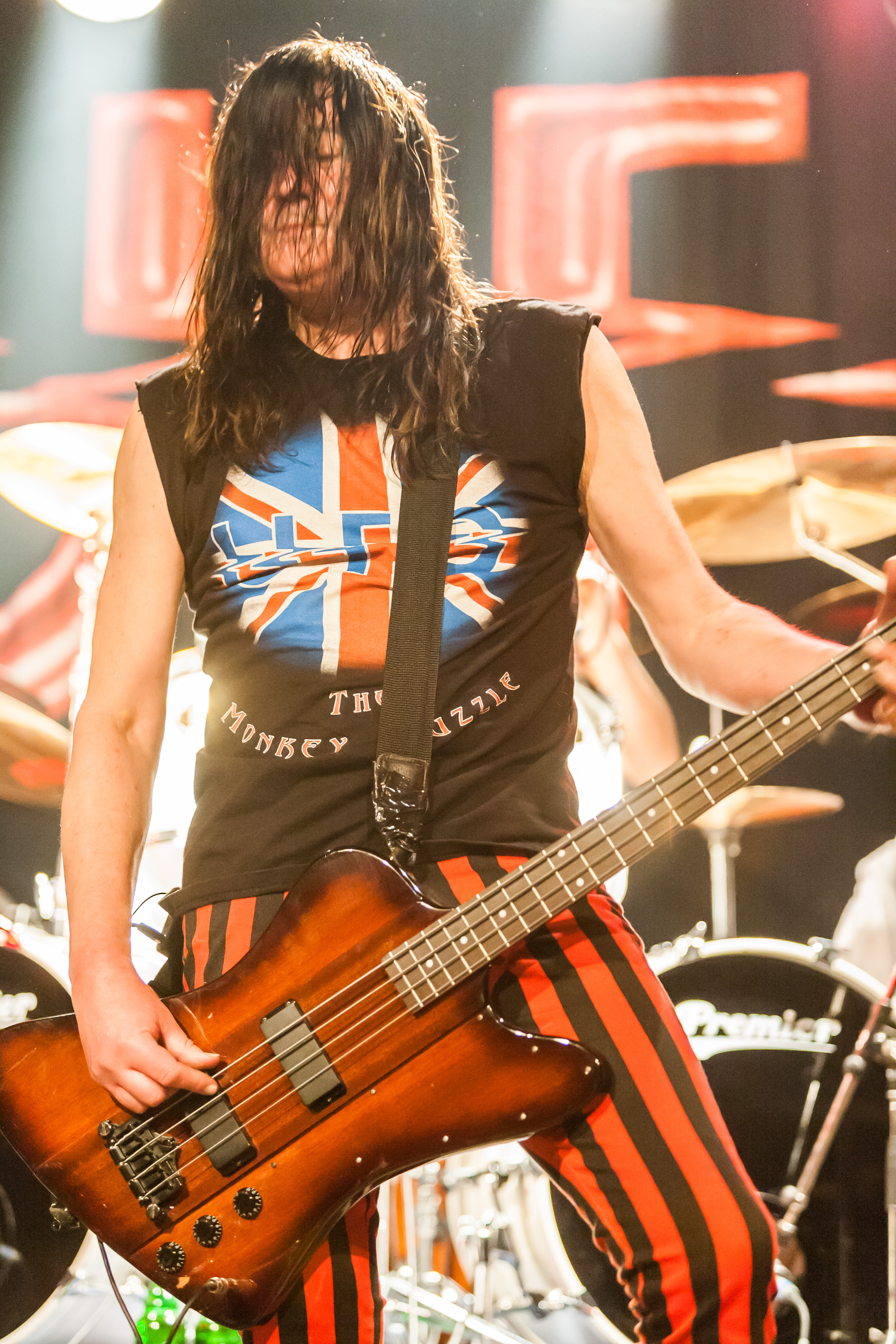
- Way in 2007

Background information
- Born: Peter Frederick Way; 7 August 1950; Enfield, Middlesex, England
- Died: 14 August 2020 (aged 70)
- Genres: Hard rock, heavy metal
- Occupation: Bassist
- Years active: 1969–2020
- Formerly of: UFO; Fastway; Waysted; The Plot

Peter Frederick Way (7 August 1950 – 14 August 2020) was an English bass guitarist. He was a co-founder and the original bassist of the rock band UFO from 1968 to 1982; he rejoined the band briefly in 1988–1989 and full-time from 1991 to 2008. He was a founder member of Waysted and Fastway, and notably played with Michael Schenker Group and Ozzy Osbourne.

== Career ==
Pete Way grew up in Enfield, London. He started playing bass guitar in bands with friends from high school. He and guitarist Mick Bolton became friends and, along with a drummer, formed their first serious band, the Boyfriends. After high school, Way left home at 17 and worked at a maritime insurance company and as a civil servant in the Ministry of Defence.

The band eventually added singer Phil Mogg to the lineup and changed its name to Hocus Pocus. After the drummer had a nervous breakdown resulting from drug abuse, he was replaced by Andy Parker. They subsequently changed the band's name again, becoming UFO. After two studio albums with original guitarist Bolton, the band recruited the guitar wunderkind Michael Schenker from Scorpions. Later, the band signed on guitarist/keyboardist and long-time friend Paul Raymond. Paul 'Tonka' Chapman replaced Schenker in the early 1980s. The group released many albums and singles and had two UK top 40 hits.

Disliking the more commercially accessible direction UFO were taking in the early 1980s, Way jumped ship to form Fastway with former Motörhead guitarist "Fast" Eddie Clarke. Way was unable to extricate himself from a contract he signed with Chrysalis and stepped down to play bass for Ozzy Osbourne during the Diary of a Madman tour.

In 1982, Way formed the punningly titled Waysted with Fin Muir, Paul Raymond, Frank Noon, and Ronnie Kayfield. Their debut album Vices was released in 1982 and reached number 78 in the UK Albums Chart. The band's third album, Save your Prayers, where Muir was replaced by Tyketto vocalist Danny Vaughn (Daniel T. Himler), was their most successful in America, where it reached number 185 in the Billboard 200.

After briefly rejoining UFO in 1988–1989, Way joined Phil Mogg in the reformed band in 1991 and recorded six more albums with them in the next 17 years: High Stakes & Dangerous Men (1992), Walk on Water (1995), Covenant (2000), Sharks (2002), You Are Here (2004) and The Monkey Puzzle (2006). Health issues forced him to leave the band in 2008.

=== Later ===
Way released two albums under the Damage Control banner. The first album, Damage Control, was recorded with Robin George, Spike, and Chris Slade; the second was recorded as a trio with George and Way sharing lead vocals.

In 2018, Way formed the Pete Way Band, along with guitarist Kamil Woj (replaced in 2019 by Tym Scopes), Jason Poole (Waysted), and Clive Edwards (UFO), with Laurence Archer (UFO) guesting on some live shows during their UK tour.

Way also recorded a guest bass on a Warfare song along with Evo and Fast Eddie Clarke titled "Misanthropy", which was released in 2021 on Cherry Red Records.

== Guitars ==
During UFO's 1970s heyday, he used a Fender Precision bass, which along with his trademark striped trousers largely influenced the stage appearance of Steve Harris.

Way switched to Gibson Thunderbird basses, which are renowned for the hard-edged rock tone; however, he later commented that he had been using an Epiphone Thunderbird as he found it seemed to have a fatter tone. He also used basses by Ibanez, most notably a pink Ibanez Iceman bass, and the Washburn B-20 for which he was pictured in an advertising campaign. His image was used in an ad campaign by Artex basses.

== Publications ==
In 2017, he released his autobiography, with the aid of professional writer Paul Rees, called A Fast Ride Out of Here: Confessions of Rock's Most Dangerous Man. In 2020, rock photographer Ross Halfin released a book of his work with Way, called Pete Way: by Ross Halfin.

== Death ==
Way died on 14 August 2020, one week after his 70th birthday, following injuries sustained in an accident two months earlier, in which he fell down stairs at his home. Way had been undergoing treatment for prostate cancer in 2013 and had a heart attack in 2016. He was survived by his two daughters. Way had been married five times, with four ending in divorce. Way died ten weeks after his former UFO bandmate and guitarist Paul Chapman, and one year after keyboardist Paul Raymond, leaving vocalist Phil Mogg and drummer Andy Parker as the only surviving members of the No Place to Run lineup.

== Discography ==
=== With UFO ===
==== Studio ====
- UFO 1 (1970)
- UFO 2: Flying (1971)
- Phenomenon (1974)
- Force It (1975)
- No Heavy Petting (1976)
- Lights Out (1977)
- Obsession (1978)
- No Place to Run (1980)
- The Wild, the Willing and the Innocent (1981)
- Mechanix (1982)
- High Stakes & Dangerous Men (1992)
- Walk on Water (1995)
- Covenant (2000)
- Sharks (2002)
- You Are Here (2004)
- The Monkey Puzzle (2006)

==== Live ====
- Live (1971)
- Live in Atlanta (1974)
- Strangers in the Night (1979)
- Lights Out in Tokyo (1992)
- Live in Japan (1992)
- T.N.T. (1993)
- Heaven's Gate (1995)
- On With The Action (1998)
- Live In Texas (2000)
- Regenerator – Live 1982 (2001)
- Showtime (2005)

==== Other ====
- Space Metal (1976)
- Anthology (1986)
- The Best of the Rest (1988)
- The Essential UFO (1992)
- The Best of UFO: Gold Collection (1996)
- X-Factor: Out There & Back (1997)
- Flying: The Early Years 1970–1973 (2004)
- An Introduction to UFO (2006)
- Warfare Misanthropy (2020)

=== With Waysted ===
- Vices (1983)
- Waysted – (EP) (1984)
- The Good the Bad the Waysted (1985)
- Save Your Prayers (1986)
- Wilderness of Mirrors (2000)
- You Won't Get Out Alive (2000)
- Back from the Dead (2004)
- Organised Chaos (2007)
- The Harsh Reality (2007)

=== With Mogg/Way ===
- Edge of the World (1997)
- Chocolate Box (1999)

=== Solo ===
- Amphetamine (2000)
- Pete Way Alive In Cleveland (2002)
- Acoustic Animal (2007)

=== With The Plot ===
- The Plot (2003) (featuring Michael Schenker on guitar)

=== With Michael Schenker ===
- Tales of Rock'n'Roll (2006)
- Temple of Rock (2011)
