= Tommy McClendon =

Japanese-American guitarist

- Also known as: Atomik Tommy M
- Born: Yokohama, Japan
- Origin: Stockton, California, U.S.
- Genres: Hard rock, heavy metal
- Occupation: Guitarist
- Years active: 1981–present
- Formerly of: UFO, Soulmotor

Tommy McClendon, also known by his stage name, Atomik Tommy M, is a Japanese-born American guitarist, best known for his work with rock band UFO from 1984 to 1988.

== Early life ==
McClendon was born in Yokohama, Japan, and moved to Stockton, California when he was 10. He began learning the violin at age 5, the piano at 10, and the guitar at 13. McClendon formed his first band with his brother, Dan, when he was 15. He graduated from Stockton's Lincoln High School in 1972. McClendon performed in multiple bands before becoming a member of UFO. The members of the group were Deep Water, Thunderwing, and Boy Wonder, the latter of which inspired his "Atomik Tommy M" stage name. His early musical influences include The Beatles, The Lovin' Spoonful, Mance Lipscomb, and Paul Butterfield.

== Career ==
=== With UFO ===
Before McClendon joined UFO, the band disbanded after its unsuccessful tour supporting Making Contact. Phil Mogg spent time in Los Angeles, where he contacted McClendon through Mike Varney, asking him to join a new band. This new band later ended up staying as UFO, and they released Misdemeanor in 1985. They also released Ain't Misbehavin' in 1988 with McClendon.

=== After UFO ===
McClendon was the guitarist for ex-Tesla bassist Brian Wheat's band Soulmotor, appearing on their first three releases. More recently, he was in the group When We Become Kings, which broke up in 2017. McClendon gives guitar lessons at The Music Box in Lodi, California.

=== Bands ===
- SoulMotor (1999) – guitars
- Revolution Wheel (2002) – guitars, keyboards
- UFO – As Atomik Tommy M (1984–1988) – guitars
