= Best Of (disambiguation) =

A best-of album is a type of compilation album that collects popular and commercially successful songs by a particular artist or band.

Best Of may also refer to:

== Albums ==
- Best Of (Animal X album), 2007
- Best Of (Between the Buried and Me album), 2011
- Best Of (Calogero album), 2019
- Best Of (The Cardigans album), 2008
- Best Of (Creedence Clearwater Revival album), 2008
- Best Of (The Czars album), 2014
- Best Of (Die Amigos album), 2023
- Best Of (Doro album), 1998
- Best Of (Epica album), 2013
- Best Of (Inna album), 2015
- Best Of (Kent album), 2016
- Best Of (LaFee album), 2009
- Best Of (Little Dragon album), 2014
- Best Of (Mental As Anything album), 1999
- Best Of (Christina Milian album), 2006
- Best Of (RBD album), 2008
- Best Of (Reverend and The Makers album), 2019
- Best Of (Stratovarius album), 2016
- Best Of (Tokio Hotel album), 2010
- Best Of (Vanilla Ninja album), 2005
- Best Of (Voice of the Beehive album), 1997
- Best Of (Roch Voisine album), 2007
- Best Of... (Sia album), 2012
- The Best Of (Big Star album), 1999
- The Best Of (Delerium album), 2004
- The Best Of (Gamma Ray album), 2015
- The Best Of (James album), 1998
- The Best Of (Michael Johnson album), 1990
- The Best Of (Motörhead album), 2000
- The Best Of (Myslovitz album), 2003
- The Best Of (CeCe Peniston album), 1998
- The Best Of (Poco album), 1980
- The Best Of (Psychopomps album), 2000
- The Best Of (Sash! album), 2008
- The Best Of (UFO album), 2002

== See also ==
- Greatest Hits (disambiguation)
- The Very Best Of (disambiguation)
- List of greatest hits albums
- Best Of (Chapter One 1997–2004), a 2005 album by Sevendust
- The Best Of (1988–1993), a 1997 album by Ziggy Marley and the Melody Makers
