= Space Metal (UFO album) =

Compilation album by UFO
- Released: 1976
- Genre: Space rock
- Length: 90:05
- Label: Nova Records

UFO chronology
No Heavy Petting (1976)	Space Metal (1976)	Lights Out (1977)

Professional ratings
Review scores
Source	Rating
AllMusic	2/5 stars
Collector's Guide to Heavy Metal	4/10
Hi-Fi News & Record Review	B:2

Space Metal is a double compilation album by UFO released on Nova Records in 1976. The double LP set combines tracks taken from their first three albums: UFO 1, Flying and their Japanese only release UFO Lands in Tokyo (The last title is given on the sleeve as UFO Live).

== Track listing ==
=== Side 1 ===
1. "Loving Cup" (Butterfield) – 5:10
2. "Shake It About" (Way/Mogg/Parker/Bolton) – 3:46
3. "Silver Bird" (Way/Mogg/Parker/Bolton) – 6:45
4. "(Come Away) Melinda" (Hellerman/Minkoff) – 4:49
5. "Evil" (Way) – 3:27

=== Side 2 ===
1. "Flying" (Way/Mogg/Parker/Bolton) – 26:30

=== Side 3 ===
1. "A Boogie for George" (Way/Mogg/Parker/Bolton) – 4:15
2. "Star Storm" (Way/Mogg/Parker/Bolton) – 18:50

=== Side 4 ===
1. "Timothy" (Way/Mogg/Parker/Bolton) – 3:28
2. "C'mon Everybody" (Cochran/Capehart) – 3:10
3. "Follow You Home" (Way) – 6:00
4. "Prince Kajuku" (Way/Mogg/Parker/Bolton) – 3:55
