= Space Metal =

Space Metal may refer to:

- Space metal, a subgenre of space rock
- Space Metal (Star One album), a 2002 album by the band Star One
- Space Metal (UFO album), a 1976 album by the band UFO
