= Phil Mogg =

British rock singer (born 1948)

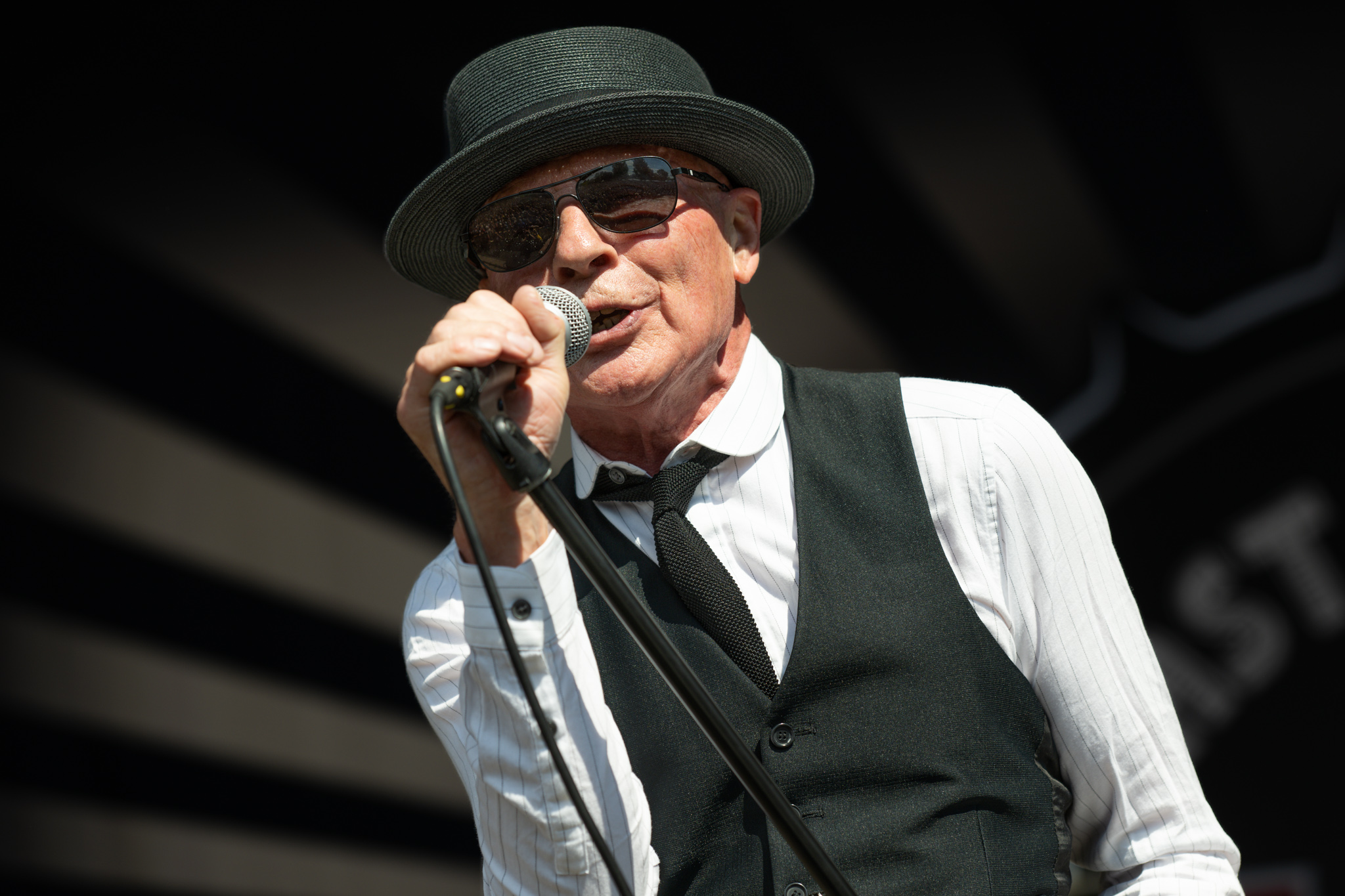
- Mogg performing with UFO in 2022

Background information
- Born: Phillip John Mogg; 15 April 1948 (age 78); Wood Green, London, England
- Genre: Hard rock
- Occupations: Singer; songwriter
- Years active: 1963–present
- Member of: Moggs Motel
- Formerly of: Mogg/Way; $ign of 4; UFO

Phillip John Mogg (born 15 April 1948) is an English singer. He was the lead singer and frontman of the hard rock band UFO, which he co-founded with longtime friends Pete Way, Andy Parker, and Mick Bolton in 1968.

== Career ==
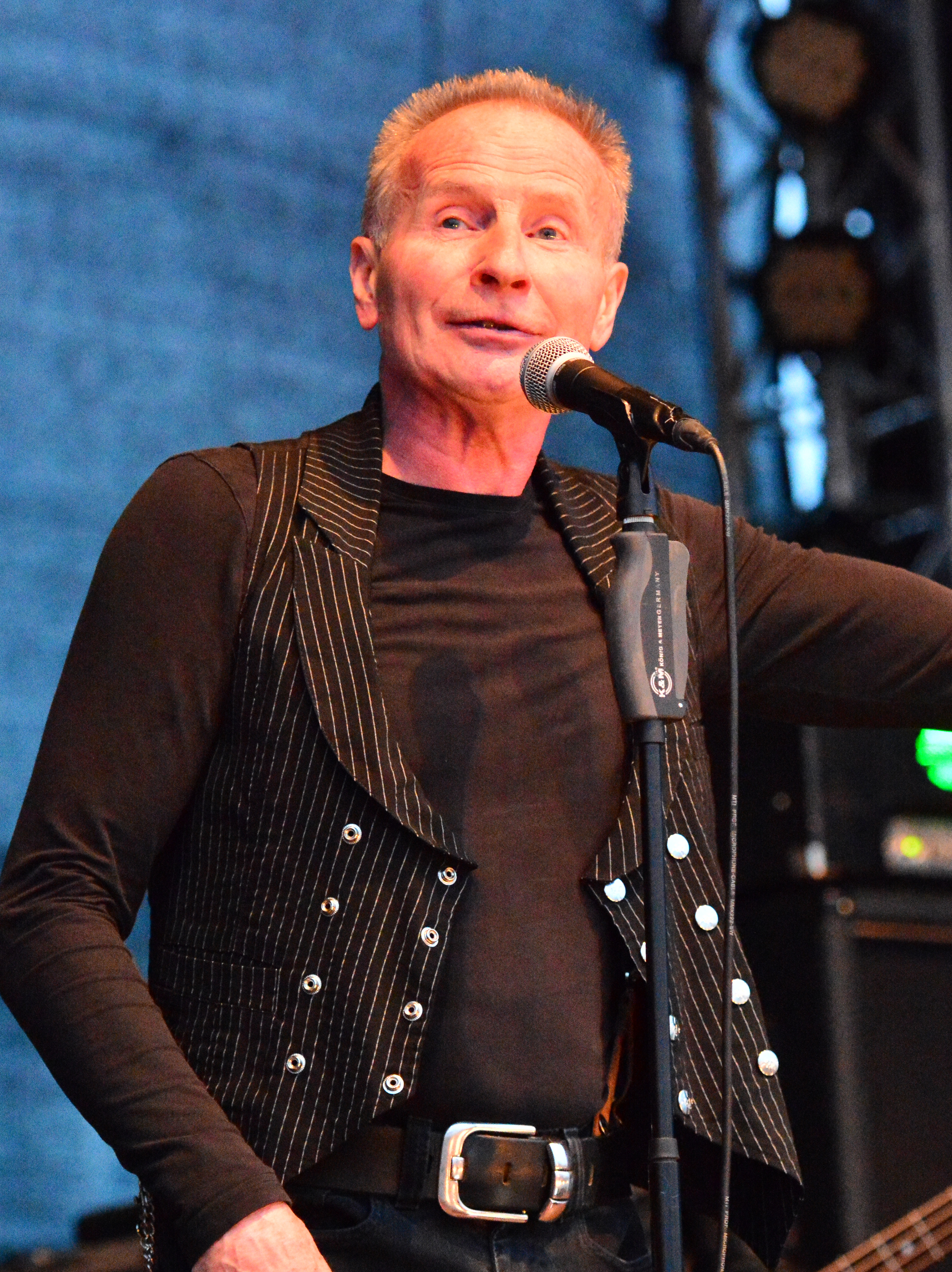
Mogg in 2015

Formed in 1968, UFO first gained notice as a space rock group with a series of recordings on Beacon/Decca Records. After guitarist Michael Schenker joined in 1973, they signed to Chrysalis Records, and changed their musical style from space rock to hard rock and heavy metal, but found only modest commercial success. However, UFO are often cited as one of the key influences on the hard rock and heavy metal scenes of the 1980s and 1990s, including bands such as Metallica, Judas Priest, Iron Maiden, Guns N' Roses, Def Leppard, Slayer, Megadeth, Testament, Overkill, Anthrax, Alice in Chains, Tesla and Dio. Mogg wrote the majority of UFO's lyrics, with the music being written by Way, Schenker, and later, Paul Raymond, although Schenker left the band in 1978 to launch his solo band. Mogg is the only member of UFO to appear on all of the band's albums and remained their only permanent member.

In 1997, during UFO's hiatus, Mogg and Way, under the moniker Mogg/Way, released a couple of albums, Edge of the World and Chocolate Box. In 2002, he was in a side project, $ign of 4, featuring Cosmosquad members Shane Gaalaas on drums and Jeff Kollman on guitar. Kollman had earlier been the guitarist and co-writer on Mogg/Way's Chocolate Box.

In late 2003, having regained the rights to the UFO name from Schenker, Mogg spoke with Pete Way and Paul Raymond, and ended up having a reunion tour which later brought the band back for good, with newly hired American guitarist Vinnie Moore. UFO have since released six more albums, the latest being the 2017 covers album The Salentino Cuts.

UFO announced their "Last Orders: 50th Anniversary" farewell tour in 2019. The band was to tour the United Kingdom from March to April, Europe from June to August, and finally the United States from October to November. The final gig was to be the Rock Legends Cruise, a five-day event in early 2020. Mogg confirmed he would retire from UFO after the tour, but did not rule out other musical ventures. The final tour was rescheduled to 2022, but cancelled due to Mogg's health status. Mogg confirmed in an April 2024 interview with Ultimate Classic Rock that UFO were no more. That same year, Mogg formed the group Moggs Motel, including former UFO keyboardist/guitarist Neil Carter as well as bassist Tony Newton, drummer Joe Lazarus and guitarist Tommy Gentry.

== Personal life ==
Phil Mogg was a junior boxing champion in North London before his music career. He has been married to Emma Mogg, a former page three girl, since 2006 and currently resides in Brighton, East Sussex. He is the uncle of Nigel Mogg, bassist of The Quireboys.

In August 2022, Mogg suffered a heart attack.

== Discography ==
=== UFO ===
==== Studio albums ====
- UFO 1 (1970) Uncharted
- Flying (1971) Uncharted
- Phenomenon (1974) Uncharted
- Force It (1975) Chart Position 71 (US)
- No Heavy Petting (1976) Chart Position 167 (US)
- Lights Out (1977) Chart Position 51 (UK), 23 (US)
- Obsession (1978) Chart Position 26 (UK), 41 (US)
- No Place to Run (1980) Chart Position 11 (UK), 51 (US)
- The Wild, the Willing and the Innocent (1981) Chart Position 19 (UK), 77 (US)
- Mechanix (1982) Chart Position 8 (UK), 82 (US)
- Making Contact (1983) Chart Position 32 (UK), 153 (US)
- Misdemeanor (1985) Chart Position 74 (UK), 106 (US)
- Ain't Misbehavin' (EP) (1988) Uncharted
- High Stakes & Dangerous Men (1992) Uncharted
- Walk on Water (1995) Uncharted
- Covenant (2000) Uncharted
- Sharks (2002) Uncharted
- You Are Here (2004) Uncharted
- The Monkey Puzzle (2006)
- The Visitor (2009)
- Seven Deadly (2012)
- A Conspiracy of Stars (2015)
- The Salentino Cuts (2017)

==== Live albums ====
- Live (1972) Uncharted
- Live in Concert (1974)
- Strangers in the Night (1979) Chart Position 42 (US), 8 (UK)
- Lights Out in Tokyo (1992)
- Live in Japan (1992)
- T.N.T. (1993)
- Heaven's Gate (1995)
- Showtime (2005)

==== Others ====
- On with the Action (1998)
- Live in Texas (2000)
- Regenerator - Live 1982 (2001)
- Space Metal (1976)
- Anthology (1986)
- The Essential UFO (1992)
- Best of UFO: Gold Collection (1996)
- X-Factor: Out There & Back (1997)
- Flying : The Early Years 1970-1973 (2004)
- An Introduction To UFO CD (2006)
- The Best of the Rest (1988)

=== Mogg/Way ===
- Edge of the World (1997)
- Chocolate Box (1999)

=== $ign of 4 ===
- Dancing With St. Peter (2002)

=== Moggs Motel ===
- Moggs Motel (2024)
