= The Good the Bad the Waysted =

Studio album by Waysted
- Released: 1985
- Recorded: Rockfield Studios, Monmouth, UK
- Genre: Hard rock
- Length: 40:28
- Label: Music for Nations
- Producer: Liam Sternberg

Waysted chronology
Waysted (1984)	The Good the Bad the Waysted (1985)	Save Your Prayers (1986)

Singles from The Good the Bad the Waysted
- 1. "Heaven Tonight" Released: 1985

Professional ratings
Review scores
Source	Rating
AllMusic	4/5 stars
Collector's Guide to Heavy Metal	8/10

The Good the Bad the Waysted is British band Waysted's third studio album, released in 1985. This album gained relative recognition with its song "Hang 'em High". It was re-issued on CD in 1995 with the songs of the EP Waysted as bonus tracks.

== Track listing ==
All songs by Muir, Chapman and Way, except "Around and Around" by Chuck Berry

Side one

1. "Hang 'em High" - 5:23
2. "Hi Ho My Baby" - 3:33
3. "Heaven Tonight" - 4:33
4. "Manuel" - 5:18

Side two

5. "Dead on Your Legs" - 4:42
6. "Rolling Out the Dice" - 3:39
7. "Land That's Lost the Love" - 4:40
8. "Crazy 'Bout the Stuff" - 5:27
9. "Around and Around" - 3:13

== Personnel ==
Band members

- Fin Muir - vocals
- Paul Chapman - guitar
- Pete Way - bass guitar

Additional musicians

- Jimmy DiLella - guitar, keyboards
- Jerry Shirley - drums

Production

- Liam Sternberg - producer
- Ted Sharp - engineer
