= The Very Best Of =

The Very Best Of may refer to:

- The Very Best Of (Alannah Myles album), 1998
- The Very Best Of (Eagles album), 2003
- The Very Best Of (Jethro Tull album), 2001
- The Very Best Of (Kiri Te Kanawa album), 2003
- The Very Best Of (Mark Williams album), 1999
- The Very Best Of: The Dubliners, an album, 2009
- The Very Best Of: 25 Years 1987–2012, an album by the Proclaimers, 2013

== See also ==
- Very Best (disambiguation)
- Greatest hits album
- Best Of (disambiguation)
