= Waysted =

British hard rock band

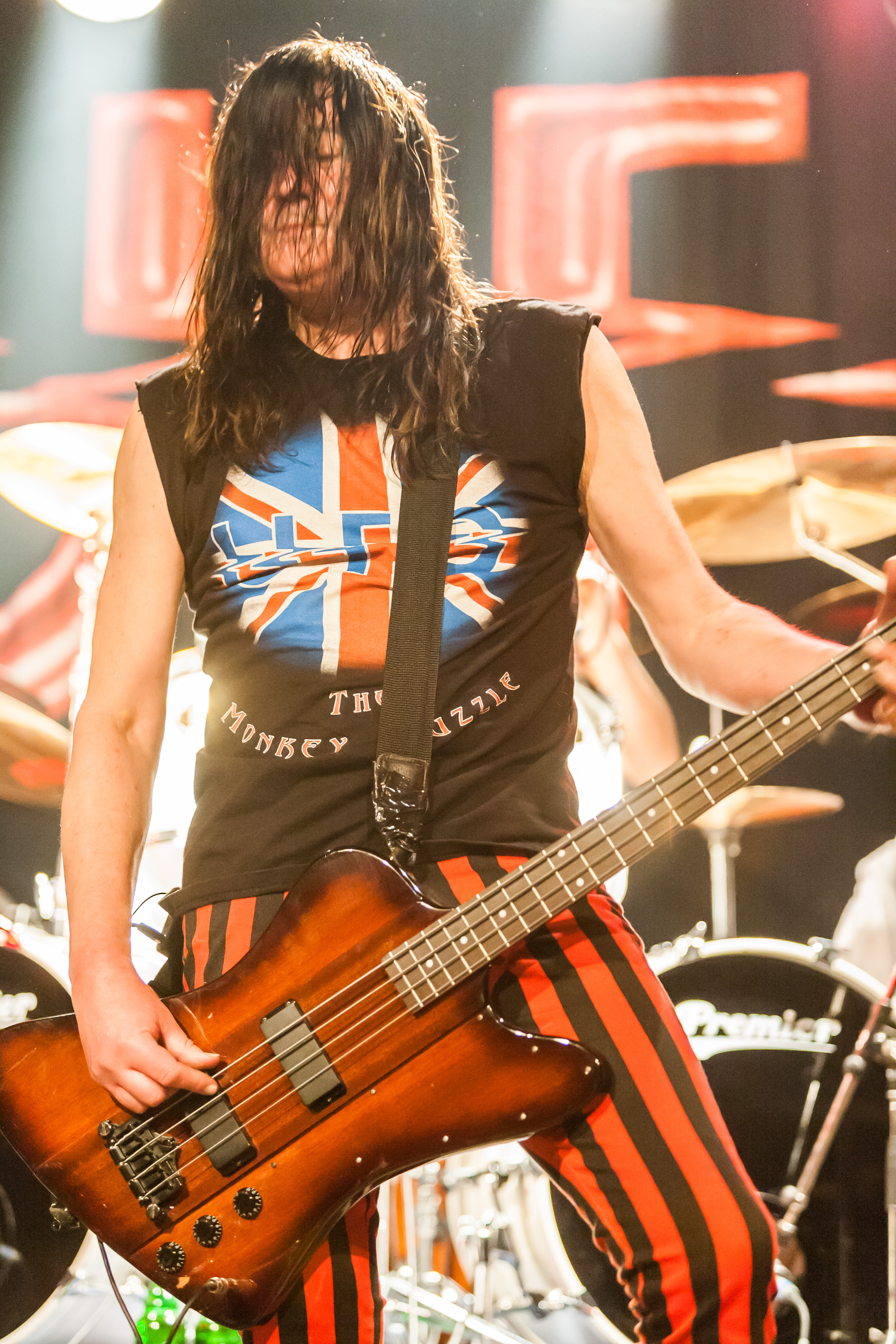
- Pete Way performing in 2007

Background information
- Origin: United Kingdom
- Genres: Hard rock, heavy metal
- Years active: 1982–1987, 2003–2020
- Labels: Chrysalis, Cargo Studios, Majestic Rock, Music for Nations, Bernett, Zoom Club
- Past members: Pete Way; Fin Muir; Chris George; Paul "RD" Haslin; Jason Poole
- Website: waysted.co.uk

Waysted were a British hard rock band, formed by former UFO bassist Pete Way and Scottish rocker Fin Muir (Ian Muir) in 1982. Recruiting Frank Noon (formerly with Def Leppard), Ronnie Kayfield and Paul Raymond, Waysted signed to Chrysalis Records and released Vices in 1983.

The band went through multiple line-up changes over the years, with members leaving, rejoining, and leaving again, as well as periods of complete dormancy while Way pursued other projects. The band split up in 1987, but then reformed in 2003.

In 2008, Waysted toured the UK in support of their then-new album The Harsh Reality. However, they did not release any further new material after that time.

Way died on 14 August 2020 from injuries sustained in an accident.

== Band members ==
=== Final lineup ===
- Pete Way – bass guitar (1982–1987; 2003–2020; died 2020)
- Fin Muir – vocals (1982–1985; 2003–2020)
- Paul "RD" Haslin – drums (2003–2020)
- Chris George – guitar (2004–2020)
- Jason Poole – guitar (2007–2020)

=== Former ===
- Paul Raymond – keyboards, guitar (1982–1984; died 2019)
- Frank Noon – drums (1982–1984)
- Ron E. Kayfield – guitar (1982–1983)
- Paul Chapman – guitar (1984–1987; 2003–2004)
- Andy Parker – drums (1984–1985)
- Barry Bennedetta – guitar (1984)
- Decca Wade – drums (1984)
- Neil Shepard – guitar (1984)
- Jimmy DiLella – keyboards, guitar (1985–1987)
- Danny Vaughn – vocals, tambourine, triangle (1985–1987)
- Johnny Dee – drums (1985–1987)
- Phil "Philthy Animal" Taylor – drums (1985)
- Jerry Shirley – drums (1985)
- Martin Chaisson – guitar (1987)
- Eric Gamens – guitar (1987)
- Jon Deverill – vocals (1987)
- Steve Harris – bass (1987 live guest member only)
- Joey Belladonna – vocals (1987 live guest member only)
- Neil Wilkinson – guitar (2007)

== Discography ==
=== Studio albums ===
- Vices (1983) No. 78 UK
- The Good the Bad the Waysted (1985)
- Save Your Prayers (1986) No. 185 UK
- Wilderness of Mirrors (2000) – Includes the Original Recordings from the 'Save Your Prayers' Sessions remixed by Paul Chapman with one bonus track.
- Back from the Dead (2004)
- The Harsh Reality (2007)

=== Live albums ===
- You Won't Get Out Alive (2000) – Live, St David's Hall, Cardiff, 1984

=== Compilation albums ===
- Totally Waysted (2008)

=== Extended plays ===
- Waysted (1984) No. 73 UK
