= Danny Peyronel =

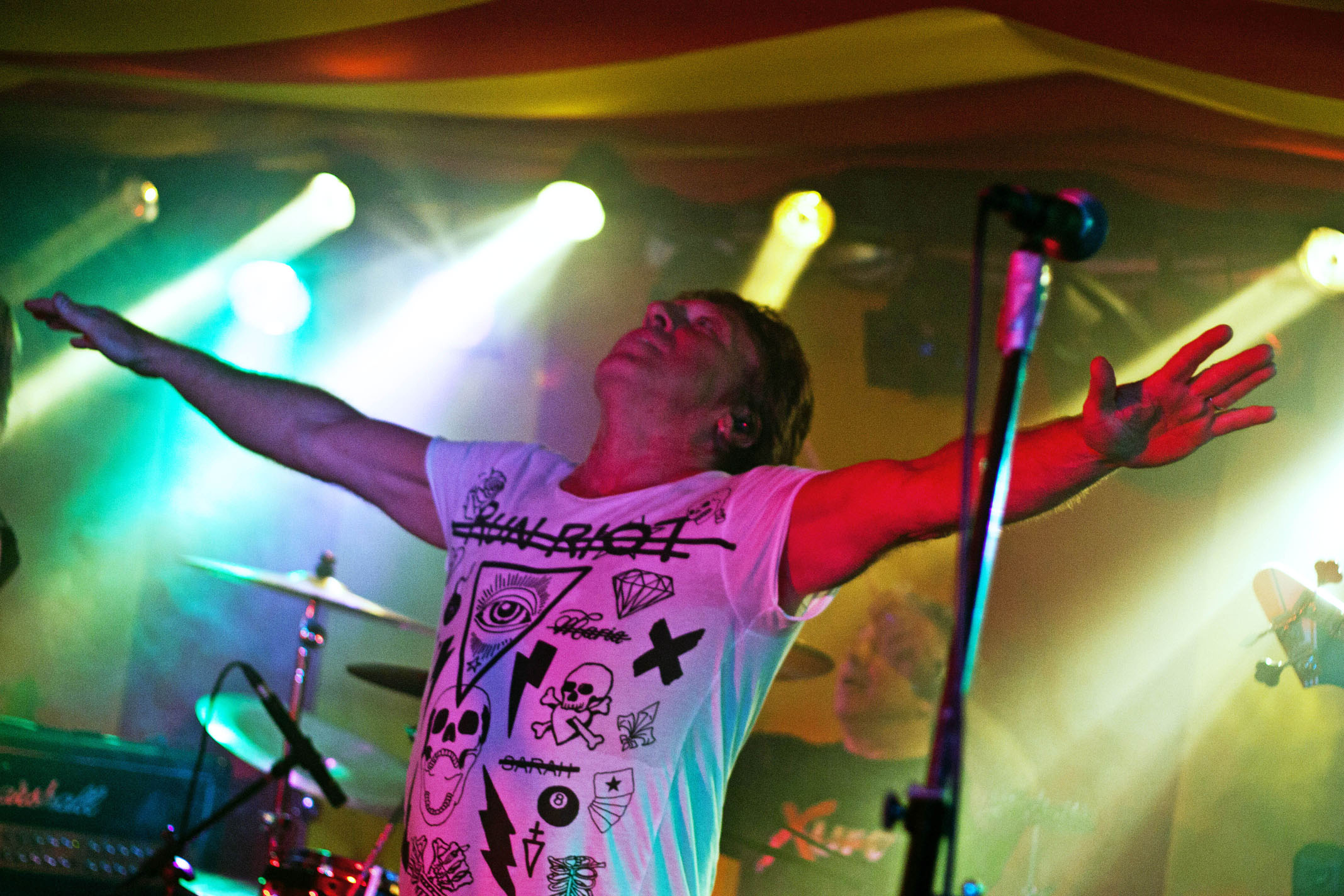
- Peyronel performing in 2013

Background information
- Born: Daniel Augusto Peyronel; 15 November 1953 (age 72); Buenos Aires, Argentina
- Genres: Hard rock; heavy metal; AOR
- Occupations: Singer; musician; songwriter; producer
- Instruments: Vocals; keyboards; piano
- Years active: 1973–present

Danny Peyronel (born Daniel Augusto Peyronel, 15 November 1953) is an English, Italian and Argentine rock singer, songwriter, keyboard player and producer born in Buenos Aires, and best known for his work in rock groups such as the Heavy Metal Kids and UFO. The second son of Ambassador the Vice-Admiral Aldo Alberto Peyronel and Biochemist Lía Elba Inés Dourron, he hails from a northern Italian, southern French, and Normand family, and had an English public school education in Buenos Aires, as well as attending public school in the USA in 1962 and 1963. After studying piano since the age of five, as well as theory and composition, he pursued further advanced musical studies at the Juilliard School in New York. Although Peyronel grew up all over the World, including the United States, he considers London his home.

== Early years ==
Danny Peyronel made his debut with the Heavy Metal Kids at London's Marquee Club in 1973. After recording two albums and subsequent tours, Peyronel left the Kids in 1975 to join UFO as their first keyboard player, where he also sang harmony vocals. Peyronel contributed to the songwriting as well, e.g., "Highway Lady" from the No Heavy Petting album. UFO later released a live album from the period when Danny Peyronel was in the band, called On with the Action, recorded live at London's The Roundhouse. His songs from that period have been included in several UFO compilations and an EMI re-issue of No Heavy Petting, credited him as the initiator of a change in the band's direction, which continued after his departure.

After leaving UFO in July 1976 following several tours on the US, Europe and the UK, Peyronel formed his own band, The Blue Max, and recorded their self titled album for Charisma Records alongside Murray Ward and Ross Elder though his main partner was Robin Millar on guitar and vocals. After a major tour of the UK, Peyronel left England and went off on a whirlwind of writing, producing and guest starring all over the world before returning to the UK. During this time he wrote the title track of Meat Loaf's "Midnight at the Lost and Found". He also guest starred on and co-produced "En acción", a live album by Riff, South America's leading hard rock band, where he teamed up with guitarist Pappo and his older brother, drummer Michel Peyronel.

== The 1980s and 1990s ==
Back in the UK, Peyronel wrote words to "Fear", which was included in Sade's second, multi-platinum album, Promise. He participated on an album by Nick Mason from Pink Floyd and Rick Fenn from 10 CC – the Mason-Fenn album Profiles; he co-wrote the only two songs with vocals and sang the lead vocal on one of them, "Israel", while David Gilmour from Pink Floyd sang "Lie for a Lie", a hit in many territories. In 1982, Meat Loaf gave Danny two song titles and asked him to write the songs for his new, third album. Peyronel wrote Midnight at the Lost and Found, which became the title track and only hit single from the album. It would later be included in the multi-platinum Hits out of Hell and innumerable compilations since. It would take Danny 40+ years to finish writing the other song, Heaven's in a Chevy Tonight, by which time, Meat Loaf had passed.

Peyronel settled in Madrid, Spain, in 1984, where he guest-starred on an album by Banzai, a metal group led by Salvador Domínguez. Dominguez, Danny Peyronel and his brother Michel, started jamming together and out of this came Tarzen, a power-house hard rock band. They signed for ATCO Records and toured the US with Twisted Sister, and Europe and South America on their own. After two albums and nearly five years together, the group split up and Peyronel moved to Los Angeles where he dabbled at songwriting and collaborating with Desmond Child, writer of multi-million selling hits by Bon Jovi, Aerosmith and Cher. He also produced a demo for a young local band called Razzle, who later became well known worldwide as Lit.

== Later years ==
In 1999, Peyronel relocated to Milan, Italy, and assembled a band to cut his debut solo album, Make the Monkey Dance, recorded and produced by Marco Barusso, and released in 2005. Musicians involved included Sinergia guitarist Luca Verde, bass player Max Zaccaro and drummer Mario Zapparoli. The album included re-workings of UFO's "Highway Lady" and Meat Loaf's "Midnight at the Lost and Found".

Peyronel then put together a new line-up of the Heavy Metal Kids, singing lead vocals and writing. In 2003, they released Hit the Right Button again with the production of Marco Barusso who also joined the band .

== X-UFO ==
June 2011 was the launch date for X-UFO, a super-group formed entirely of UFO and UFO spin-off MSG members Laurence Archer on guitar and vocals, Danny Peyronel, Clive Edwards on drums and Rocky Newton on bass and vocals.

Peyronel has taken the role of frontman/lead-singer, whilst still handling short keyboard parts. They played their debut concert as headliners at the 'Hard Rock Hell Road Trip Festival' in Ibiza, and are now embarking on several high-profile appearances, such as the 'Aero Rock Starz Festival' in Bulgaria on 9 July 2011. They perform their own versions of the classic UFO catalogue, with a large percentage of the material consisting of UFO classics written or co-written by the band-members.

X-UFO released Vol.1: The Live Files!, a live album recorded at festival appearances throughout Europe and mixed in Hannover by producer Steve Mann.

== House of X ==
Three years of touring and recording as X-UFO led to the band finding their own identity and prompting a 're-branding' as House of X. They completed a new, self-titled album, consisting of entirely new songs, with the exception of a markedly heavier version of Danny Peyronel's classic UFO ballad "Martian Landscape". House of X had its Worldwide release on Escape Music on 24 October 2014.

== Opera ==
Danny sang opera in the 1990's for almost 5 years as a 'spinto' tenor, studying with Franco Corelli in NYC. During that period he also collaborated with Richie Ranno, lead guitarist from the band Starz. Danny recorded 2 songs for a Cheap Trick Tribute CD with Richie, Eddie Ojeda and Frank Dimino.

== Present Day ==
After moving to Barcelona in 2021, Danny teamed up with guitarist David Pereira-Oleart, from Spanish band Lipstick, resulting in a new solo album, It Happens When you Look the Other Way, produced by Pereira-Oleart, who also co-wrote songs and created and directed stunning videos of many of the singles. The album features Heaven's in a Chevy Tonight, the second song title Meat Loaf had given Danny in 1982, which was recorded as a memorial to his fallen friend. The critically acclaimed It Happens when you Look the Other Way had its world-wide release in 2025 on DPX2 Records International. Danny will be touring in 2026 to promote the album.

== Personal life ==
In 1976, Danny married Alexandra Louise Rubens, an artist and fashion designer (B.A. Hons. Saint Martin's School of Arts), daughter of Colonel Ralph Alexander Rubens, Sherwood Foresters, and Lady Rosemary Alexandra Eliot. She is the niece of Henry Somerset, 10th Duke of Beaufort, granddaughter of John Eliot, 6th Earl of St Germans and heiress to the Baronies of Botetourt (1305) and Mordaunt (1529). She is a direct descendent of William the Conqueror and of Guifré el Pilós, know in English as Wilfred the Hairy, Count of Barcelona, Urgell, Cerdanya, Girona, Besalú and Ausona. He was the founder of the House of Barcelona and is widely regarded as the founder of Catalonia. In 1977, they had a son, Jesse Alexander Peyronel, today a film and TV director, screenwriter and producer.^{[9] [10]}

== Bibliography ==
1. York, W, (1982). Who's Who in Rock, Arthur Barker, Ltd.
2. Jasper, T & Oliver, D, (1983). The International Encyclopedia of Hard Rock and Heavy Metal, Sidgwick and Jackson, Ltd.
3. Van den Heuvel, J A, (1990). Hard Rock and Heavy Metal Encyclopedia, Arcana Editrice, Srl.
4. Fitch, V (1999). The Pink Floyd Encyclopedia, Collector's Guide Publishing, Inc.
5. Sharpe-Young, G & Reynolds, D, (2003). A-Z of '80s Rock, Cherry Red Books Ltd.
6. Popoff, M, (2005). UFO Shoot Out The Lights, Metal Blade, Inc.
7. Daniels, Neil, (2013). High Stakes & Dangerous Men THE UFO STORY, Soundcheck Books, LLP. ISBN 978-0-9571442-6-2
8. Blake, Mark (2007). Pigs Might Fly THE INSIDE STORY OF PINK FLOYD, Aurum Press Limited. ISBN 978-1-84513-261-3
9. Ellis, Patricia (1990). Debrett's Distinguished People of Today 1990, Debrett's Peerage Limited. ISBN 1-870520-03-3
10. Kidd, Charles, Debrett's Peerage & Baronetage 2015 Edition, London, 2015.ISBN 9780992934828
