= Vices (Waysted album) =

Studio album by Waysted
- Released: 10 November 1983
- Recorded: August 1983
- Studio: Moor Hall, Sutton Coldfield, Birmingham, England with the Manor Mobile; Parkgate Studios, Battle, Sussex, UK
- Genre: Heavy metal
- Length: 38:03
- Label: Chrysalis
- Producer: Mick Glossop

Waysted chronology
Vices (1983)	Waysted (1984)

Singles from Vices
- 1. "Women in Chains" / "Can't Take That Love Away" Released: November 1983

Professional ratings
Review scores
Source	Rating
AllMusic	2.5/5 stars
Collector's Guide to Heavy Metal	10/10
Metal Forces	6/10

Vices is the debut studio album by English heavy metal band Waysted, released on 10 November 1983, through Chrysalis.

== Track listing ==
Side one
No.	Title	Writer(s)	Length
1.	"Love Loaded"	Pete Way; Ronnie Kayfield; Fin Muir	3:54
2.	"Women in Chains"	Kayfield; Muir	4:20
3.	"Sleazy"	Paul Raymond; Kayfield; Muir	4:13
4.	"Night of the Wolf"	Way	5:01

Side two
No.	Title	Writer(s)	Length
5.	"Toy with the Passion"	Way; Kayfield; Muir	4:03
6.	"Right from the Start"	Way; Muir	5:34
7.	"Hot Love"	Way; Muir	4:22
8.	"All Belongs to You"	Raymond	3:33
9.	"Somebody to Love" (Jefferson Airplane cover)	Darby Slick	3:03
Total length:			38:03

== Personnel ==
Waysted

- Fin Muir - lead vocals
- Ronnie Kayfield - lead guitar, backing vocals
- Paul Raymond - rhythm guitar, keyboards, backing vocals, mixing
- Pete Way - bass guitar, mixing
- Frank Noon - drums

Production

- Mick Glossop - producer, engineer, mixing at Maison Rouge and The Townhouse, London
- Dave Chapman - assistant engineer
- John Pasche - cover design

== Charts ==
Chart (1983)	Peak position
UK Albums (OCC)	78
