= Very Best =

Very Best or The Very Best may refer to

- The Very Best (band), a London-based Afro-Western music trio
- The Very Best (Earth, Wind & Fire album), 1994
- The Very Best (INXS album), 2011
- Very Best, an album by V6, 2001
- "Very Best", a song by Rick Ross from Black Market, 2015

== See also ==
- The Very Best Of (disambiguation)
