= Waysted (album) =

EP by Waysted
- Released: September 1984
- Genre: Hard rock
- Length: 24:51
- Label: Music for Nations
- Producer: Leo Lyons

Waysted chronology
Vices (1983)	Waysted (1984)	The Good the Bad the Waysted (1985)

Professional ratings
Review scores
Source	Rating
AllMusic	4.5/5 stars
Collector's Guide to Heavy Metal	8/10

Waysted is the first extended play and second overall release by British band Waysted. It was released in 1984 and reached No. 73 on the UK Albums Chart. The EP was re-issued on CD as Waysted Plus in 2008, with six songs recorded live at the Kerrang! Weekend Festival, Caister, Great Yarmouth, UK on 14 October 1984.

== Track listing ==
All songs written by Fin Muir and Pete Way.

Side one

1. "Won't Get Out Alive" - 2:46
2. "Price You Pay" - 5:49
3. "Rock Steady" - 3:39

Side two

4. "Hurt So Good" - 4:20
5. "Cinderella Boys" - 8:17

=== Waysted Plus bonus tracks ===
6. "Ball and Chain" (live) - 4:30
7. "Won't Get Out Alive" (live) - 4:30
8. "Rock Steady" (live) - 3:47
9. "Love Loaded" (live) - 4:43
10. "The Price You Pay" (live) - 6:31
11. "Too Hot to Handle" (live) - 5:26

== Personnel ==
Waysted

- Fin Muir - vocals
- Paul Chapman - guitar
- Neil Shepard - guitar
- Pete Way - bass guitar
- Andy Parker - drums

Production

- Leo Lyons - producer, engineer

== Charts ==
Chart (1984)	Peak position
UK Albums (OCC)	73
