= The Best of UFO (1974–1983) =

Greatest hits album by UFO
- Released: 15 April 2008
- Genre: Hard rock, heavy metal
- Length: 82:02
- Label: Chrysalis / EMI

UFO chronology
The Monkey Puzzle (2006)	The Best of UFO (1974–1983) (2008)	The Visitor (2009)

Professional ratings
Review scores
Source	Rating
AllMusic	4/5 stars

The Best of UFO (1974–1983) is a greatest hits collection by the British hard rock band UFO, released in 2008. All songs were digitally remastered in 2007 and 2008.

== Track listing ==
1. "Rock Bottom" - 6:30
2. "Oh My" - 2:24
3. "Let It Roll" - 3:56
4. "Shoot Shoot" - 3:38
5. "Can You Roll Her" - 2:56
6. "I'm a Loser" - 3:53
7. "Natural Thing" - 4:00
8. "Lights Out" - 4:30
9. "Love to Love" - 7:04
10. "Too Hot to Handle" - 3:37
11. "Only You Can Rock Me" (7" version) - 3:31
12. "Doctor Doctor" (live 7" edit) - 3:41
13. "Lettin' Go" - 4:02
14. "Young Blood" (7" edit) - 3:06
15. "Lonely Heart" (7" edit) - 4:13
16. "Chains Chains" - 3:25
17. "Let It Rain" - 4:01
18. "We Belong to the Night" - 3:59
19. "When It's Time to Rock" - 3:46
