= UFO 1 =

Studio album by UFO
- Released: October 1970
- Recorded: July 1970
- Studio: Jackson Studios, Rickmansworth, Herts, England
- Genre: Space rock; psychedelic rock garage rock; hard rock
- Length: 39:06
- Label: Beacon (UK); Decca (Germany); Rare Earth (United States); Stateside (Japan)
- Producer: Guy Fletcher, Doug Flett

UFO chronology
UFO 1 (1970)	UFO 2: Flying (1971)

Singles from UFO1
- 1. "Shake It About" Released: 19 June 1970; 2. "(Come Away) Melinda" Released: August 1970; 3. "Boogie for George" Released: October 1970; 4. "C'mon Everybody" Released: December 1970 (Europe)

Professional ratings
Review scores
Source	Rating
AllMusic	3/5 stars
Collector's Guide to Heavy Metal	3/10
The Encyclopedia of Popular Music	2/5 stars

UFO 1 is the debut studio album by British rock band UFO. It was first released in the UK by Beacon Records in October 1970. The first US release was on Rare Earth Records in April 1971. Neither of these releases charted, but the album succeeded in Germany and Japan.

The album was reissued under the title Unidentified Flying Object, featuring four of the five tracks from the band's second album. This reissue shows a photo of the band from the 1980s on the cover.

The album was also reissued on the Flying: The Early Years 1970–1973 compilation album of 2004, along with all the other recordings made by the band with their original guitarist, Mick Bolton. It was also given a straight reissue under the name All The Hits & More - The Early Days (XXX Media, Germany, 2011), with no additional tracks.

== Track listing ==
All tracks are written by Pete Way, Phil Mogg, Andy Parker, and Mick Bolton, except where noted.

Side one
No.	Title	Writer(s)	Length
1.	"Unidentified Flying Object" (instrumental)		2:19
2.	"Boogie for George"		4:16
3.	"C'mon Everybody"	Eddie Cochran, Jerry Capehart	3:12
4.	"Shake It About"		3:47
5.	"(Come Away) Melinda"	Fred Hellerman, Fran Minkoff	5:04

Side two
No.	Title	Writer(s)	Length
6.	"Timothy"		3:29
7.	"Follow You Home"	Way	2:13
8.	"Treacle People"	Bolton	3:23
9.	"Who Do You Love?"	Ellas McDaniel (Bo Diddley)	7:49
10.	"Evil"	Way	3:27

- The title "Boogie for George" was shortened to "Boogie" on the CD reissue (1994, Repertoire Records).

== Personnel ==
UFO

- Phil Mogg – vocals
- Mick Bolton – guitar
- Pete Way – bass
- Andy Parker – drums

Production

- Guy Fletcher, Doug Flett – producers
- Milton Samuel – executive producer
- Derek Abrahams – liner notes
