= Ain't Misbehavin' (UFO album) =

EP by UFO
- Released: 28 March 1988
- Recorded: 1987
- Studio: Abattoir Studio, Birmingham and S.S.E., UK
- Genre: Hard rock, heavy metal
- Length: 26:55
- Label: FM/Revolver
- Producer: Neil Levine

UFO chronology
Misdemeanor (1985)	Ain't Misbehavin' (1988)	High Stakes & Dangerous Men (1992)

Professional ratings
Review scores
Source	Rating
AllMusic	2/5 stars
Collector's Guide to Heavy Metal	4/10
The Encyclopedia of Popular Music	3/5 stars

Ain't Misbehavin' is an EP by English rock band UFO, recorded in 1987 after the band's USA tour, and released early in 1988. It is the band's only release to feature only one member from the band's classic Strangers in the Night lineup, specifically vocalist Phil Mogg.

== Track listing ==
Side one
No.	Title	Writer(s)	Length
1.	"Between a Rock and a Hard Place"	Tommy McClendon, Phil Mogg	3:37
2.	"Another Saturday Night"	Paul Gray, Mogg	4:39
3.	"At War with the World"	McClendon, Mogg	3:03

Side two
No.	Title	Writer(s)	Length
4.	"Hunger in the Night"	McClendon, Mogg, Gray	4:10
5.	"Easy Money"	McClendon, Mogg	3:37
6.	"Rock Boyz, Rock"	McClendon, Mogg, Gray, Jim Simpson	3:19

CD edition bonus track
No.	Title	Writer(s)	Length
7.	"Lonely Cities (Of the Heart)"	McClendon, Mogg	4:16

== Personnel ==
UFO

- Phil Mogg – vocals
- Paul Gray – bass guitar
- Tommy McClendon (a.k.a. Atomik Tommy M) – guitar, backing vocals
- Jim Simpson – drums, backing vocals
- ? – keyboards

Production

- Neil Levine – executive producer, engineer, mixing
- Alan Cave, John Shaw – engineers, mixing
- Brian Downey – album art artist
