= Live Throughout the Years =

UFO Live Throughout the Years

Live album by UFO
- Released: 2007
- Genre: Hard rock, heavy metal
- Producer: UFO

Live Throughout the Years is a 4-CD set of live material by British hard rock band UFO issued in 2007.

AllMusic noted about the album, "While Live Throughout the Years will probably be too much to chew on for newcomers, it will be a meaty three-course meal for old-timers."

== Track listing ==
CD1 - LIVE AT THE ROUNDHOUSE, LONDON 1976

1. Can You Roll Her
2. Doctor Doctor
3. Oh My
4. Out On The Street
5. Highway Lady
6. I'm A Loser
7. Let It Roll
8. This Kids
9. Shoot Shoot
10. Rock Bottom
11. C’mon Everybody
12. Boogie For George
13. All Or Nothing

CD2 - HAMMERSMITH ODEON, LONDON 1982

1. We Belong To The Night
2. Let It Rain
3. Long Gone
4. Wild, Willing, Innocent
5. Only You Can Rock Me
6. No Place To Run
7. Love To Love
8. Doing It All For You
9. Makin’ Moves
10. Too Hot To Handle
11. Mystery Train

CD3 - VIENNA, AUSTRIA 1998

1. Natural Thing
2. Mother Mary
3. A Self Made Man
4. Electric Phase
5. This Kids
6. Out In The Street
7. One More For The Rodeo
8. Venus
9. Pushed To The Limit

CD4 - VIENNA, AUSTRIA 1998

1. Love To Love
2. Too Hot To Handle
3. Only You Can Rock Me
4. Lights Out
5. Doctor Doctor
6. Rock Bottom
7. Shoot Shoot
