= UFO 2: Flying =

Studio album by UFO
- Released: October 1971
- Recorded: 1971
- Studio: Nova Sound (London)
- Genre: Space rock; hard rock; psychedelia
- Length: 60:00
- Label: Beacon
- Producer: UFO

UFO chronology
| UFO 1 (1970) | UFO 2: Flying (1971) | Live (1971) |

Singles from UFO 2: Flying
- 1. "Prince Kajuku" Released: 1971

Professional ratings
Review scores
| Source | Rating |
|---|---|
| AllMusic | 3/5 stars |
| Collector's Guide to Heavy Metal | 1/10 |
| The Encyclopedia of Popular Music | 2/5 stars |

UFO 2: Flying (sometimes called simply UFO 2 or Flying; also subtitled Space Rock) is the second studio album by English rock band UFO. It was released in October 1971 by the Beacon label. It was issued on CD in 1999 by Repertoire Records.

The album is distinctive for its title track, which was one of the longest tracks recorded in rock music up to that point and the longest track the band ever recorded. The track finishes with a backmasked reading from Rudyard Kipling's Gunga Din, "Tho' I've belted you an' flayed you, By the livin' God that made you, You're a better man than I am, Gunga Din!", and a slowed phrase, "Yes we know, it's all been done before before before".

The album was reissued on the Flying: The Early Years 1970–1973 compilation album of 2004, along with all the other recordings made by the band with their original guitarist, Mick Bolton.

== Track listing ==
All tracks are written by UFO.

Side one
| No. | Title | Length |
|---|---|---|
| 1. | "Silver Bird" | 6:54 |
| 2. | "Star Storm" | 18:54 |
| 3. | "Prince Kajuku" | 3:56 |

Side two
| No. | Title | Length |
|---|---|---|
| 4. | "The Coming of Prince Kajuku" | 3:43 |
| 5. | "Flying" | 26:30 |

2008 CD reissue bonus track
| No. | Title | Length |
|---|---|---|
| 6. | "Galactic Love" (A-side single) | 2:57 |

== Personnel ==
UFO

- Phil Mogg – vocals
- Mick Bolton – guitar
- Pete Way – bass guitar
- Andy Parker – drums

Production

- UFO – producers
- Milton Samuel – executive producer
- Ian Latimer – design
- Günter Blum – front cover illustration
- Peter Reeves – back cover illustration
