= Live (UFO album) =

- Cover art of the 1972 Decca edition

Live album by UFO
- Released: 20 December 1971 (Japan); September 1972 (Germany); 1982 (UK)
- Recorded: 25 September 1971
- Venues: Hibiya Park, Tokyo, Japan
- Genres: Blues rock; hard rock; psychedelic rock
- Length: 45:24
- Labels: Stateside (Japan); Decca (Germany)
- Producers: UFO; Milton Samuel

UFO chronology
UFO 2: Flying (1971)	Live (1971)	Phenomenon (1974)

Singles from Live
- 1. "Galactic Love" / "Loving Cup" Released: 28 September 1972 (Ger.)

Professional ratings
Review scores
Source	Rating
AllMusic	3/5 stars
Collector's Guide to Heavy Metal	5/10
The Encyclopedia of Popular Music	3/5 stars

Live is the first live album by the British rock band UFO, recorded in Tokyo, Japan, on 25 September 1971. It was initially released exclusively in Japan in December 1971 entitled U.F.O. Landed Japan. It was later released abroad from 1972 onwards with different titles, such as UFO Live in Japan and UFO Lands in Tokyo.

The album features the original lineup of the band, with Mick Bolton on guitar, and consists of songs from their first two blues space-rock albums and cover versions of blues songs. All of the tracks are in a jam-oriented style that is very different from the aggressive, song-oriented style they would be later known for. It was the last album to feature Bolton.

The album was reissued on the Flying: The Early Years 1970–1973 compilation album of 2004, along with all the other recordings made with Bolton as the guitarist.

== Track listing ==
Side one

1. "C'mon Everybody" (Jerry Capehart, Eddie Cochran) – 4:10
2. "Who Do You Love?" (Ellas McDaniel) – 9:00
3. "Loving Cup" (Paul Butterfield) – 5:10

Side two

4. "Prince Kajuku"/"The Coming of Prince Kajuku" (Mick Bolton, Phil Mogg, Andy Parker, Pete Way) – 8:20
5. "Boogie for George" (Bolton, Mogg, Parker, Way) – 11:30
6. "Follow You Home" (Way) – 6:00

Bonus track on Repertoire CD release

7. "Loving Cup" (Single edit) – 3:59

== Chart ==
Chart (1972)	Peak position
German Albums (Offizielle Top 100)	23

== Personnel ==
- Phil Mogg – vocals
- Mick Bolton – guitar
- Pete Way – bass
- Andy Parker – drums
