= An Introduction to UFO =

Compilation album by UFO
- Released: 8 August 2006
- Genre: Hard rock, space rock
- Length: 67:28
- Label: Varèse Sarabande

UFO chronology
Showtime (2005)	An Introduction to UFO (2006)	The Monkey Puzzle (2006)

Professional ratings
Review scores
Source	Rating
AllMusic	2.5/5 stars

An Introduction to UFO is a 2006 CD compilation of songs, by the British hard rock band UFO. It was extracted mainly from the band's first two albums.

== Track listing ==
1. "Boogie" - 4:17
2. "Prince Kajuku" - 3:56
3. "Timothy" - 3:29
4. "C'mon Everybody" - 3:12
5. "Follow You Home" - 2:14
6. "Shake It About" - 3:47
7. "Galactic Love" - 2:56
8. "(Come Away) Melinda" - 5:06
9. "Unidentified Flying Object" - 2:19
10. "Loving Cup" - 3:52
11. "Give Her the Gun" - 4:00
12. "Sweet Little Thing" - 3:51
13. "Evil" - 3:27
14. "Who Do You Love?" - 7:50
15. "C'mon Everybody" (live) - 4:20
16. "Rock Bottom" (live) - 8:52
