= Misdemeanor (UFO album) =

Studio album by UFO
- Released: 4 November 1985
- Studios: The Manor Studio, Shipton-on-Cherwell, Oxfordshire, Wisseloord Studios, Hilversum, Netherlands
- Genres: Hard rock, heavy metal
- Length: 46:31
- Label: Chrysalis
- Producer: Nick Tauber

UFO chronology
Making Contact (1983)	Misdemeanor (1985)	Ain't Misbehavin' (1988)

Singles from Misdemeanor
- 1. "This Time" Released: 21 October 1985; 2. "Night Run (US remix)" Released: 24 February 1986

Professional ratings
Review scores
Source	Rating
AllMusic	2/5 stars
Collector's Guide to Heavy Metal	3/10
The Encyclopedia of Popular Music	3/5 stars
Kerrang!	4.5/5 stars

Misdemeanor is the twelfth studio album by the English rock band UFO, released in 1985. After the disastrous tour supporting Making Contact, UFO disbanded, with lead singer and founding band member Phil Mogg spending time in Los Angeles, where he contacted (through Mike Varney) guitarist Atomik Tommy M. Mogg decided to start a new band, involving the new American guitarist and Paul Gray, who had played bass guitar in the last UFO tour. The three of them recruited former UFO keyboard player Paul Raymond and drummer Robbie France and started writing new material. Chrysalis Records signed the new band as UFO and assigned experienced producer Nick Tauber for the recording process of a new album. France resigned before the recording started and was replaced by former Magnum drummer Jim Simpson. Paul Raymond quit the band during their US tour in August 1986 and was replaced for the rest of the tour by David Jacobson.

== Track listing ==
Side one
No.	Title	Writer(s)	Length
1.	"This Time"	Paul Gray, Phil Mogg	4:36
2.	"One Heart"	Gray, Mogg, Tommy McClendon	4:09
3.	"Night Run"	Gray, Mogg, McClendon	4:32
4.	"The Only Ones"	Gray, Mogg	5:16
5.	"Meanstreets"	McClendon, Mogg	4:17

Side two
No.	Title	Writer(s)	Length
6.	"Name of Love"	McClendon, Mogg	4:37
7.	"Blue"	Gray, Mogg	5:18
8.	"Dream the Dream"	Paul Raymond, Mogg	4:32
9.	"Heaven's Gate"	McClendon, Mogg	4:15
10.	"Wreckless"	McClendon, Mogg	4:59

Japanese CD edition bonus tracks
No.	Title	Length
11.	"Night Run" (U.S. Remix)	4:24
12.	"This Time" (U.S. Remix)	4:39
13.	"Heaven's Gate" (U.S. Remix)	4:15

== Personnel ==
UFO

- Phil Mogg – vocals
- Paul Gray – bass
- Paul Raymond – keyboards, guitar
- Tommy McClendon (Atomik Tommy M) – guitar
- Jim Simpson – drums

Production

- Nick Tauber – producer
- Jon Jacobs – engineer, mixing
- Steve Lyon – assistant engineer
- Dave Wittman – remixing on tracks 1–3, 6, 7

== Charts ==
Chart (1985–1986)	Peak position
UK Albums (Official Charts)	74
Billboard 200	106
