= Doctor Doctor (UFO song) =

Single by UFO

from the album Phenomenon and Strangers in the Night
- B-side: "Lipstick Traces"
- Released: 22 March 1974; January 1979 (live single)
- Genre: Hard rock, heavy metal
- Length: 4:10 (studio)
- Label: Chrysalis
- Songwriters: Michael Schenker, Phil Mogg
- Producer: Leo Lyons

UFO singles chronology
"Galactic Love" (1972)	"Doctor Doctor" (1974)	"Shoot Shoot" (1979)

"Doctor Doctor" is a song by English rock band UFO, composed by guitarist Michael Schenker at the age of 18, with lyrics by singer Phil Mogg. It was released as a single from their third album, Phenomenon (1974).

The song did not enter the UK Singles Chart on release, but peaked in Australia at number 97, becoming the group's only charting single in that territory. A live recording from the 1979 album Strangers in the Night was released as a single and became the first top 40 hit for the band. In 2010, a live version with Vinnie Moore was released in the Best of a Decade album.

UFO and Schenker's subsequent band, the Michael Schenker Group, play "Doctor Doctor" live at almost all their concerts. It has been covered by several bands, most notably Iron Maiden, who have famously played the song over their PA as the intro to almost all their concerts since 2000.

== Personnel ==
- Phil Mogg – vocals
- Andy Parker – drums
- Pete Way – bass
- Michael Schenker – guitar
- Paul Raymond - keyboards (live version only)

== Chart ==
Chart (1979)	Peak Position
UK Singles (Official Charts)	35
