= Phenomenon (UFO album) =

Studio album by UFO
- Released: May 1974
- Recorded: 1973–1974
- Studio: Morgan (London)
- Genres: Rock, hard rock
- Length: 39:28
- Label: Chrysalis
- Producer: Leo Lyons

UFO chronology
Live (1971)	Phenomenon (1974)	Force It (1975)

Singles from Phenomenon
- 1. "Give Her the Gun" Released: 1973 (Ger.); 2. "Doctor Doctor" Released: 22 March 1974

Professional ratings
Review scores
Source	Rating
AllMusic	3/5 stars
Collector's Guide to Heavy Metal	7/10
The Encyclopedia of Popular Music	4/5 stars
Tom Hull	B

Phenomenon is the third studio album by English rock band UFO, released in May 1974. It was the band's first album after German guitarist Michael Schenker joined them, replacing Mick Bolton.

== Production ==
Their third studio album, Phenomenon was UFO's debut with major label Chrysalis Records and their second to be released in the United States. With the arrival of former Scorpions guitarist Michael Schenker, Phenomenon saw UFO leave their blues-based space rock sound behind and transition to a more straightforward hard rock sound.

"With the Scorpions, I had recorded [the title track of] Lonesome Crow, but 'Rock Bottom' was the continuation of that. I needed to have a song in which I could improvise and go on an adventure. The version that we recorded for Phenomenon had begun in rehearsals as a riff, and we kept adding more riffs to it. And then Phil [Mogg, singer] leapt up and said, 'This is how we'll make it into a song'... I still think of 'Rock Bottom' as a work in progress. When I play it live now, I use the most memorable parts of the solo, and keep a space to represent my latest frame of mind." – Michael Schenker

The album was produced by Leo Lyons, bassist of English rock group Ten Years After. All tracks were recorded at Morgan Studios in London. The original cover design and photos were by Hipgnosis.

On some early pressings, the song title "Too Young to Know" was misspelt "Too Young to No".

== Influence ==
British heavy metal band Iron Maiden released a cover version of "Doctor Doctor" as the b-side of the "Lord of the Flies" single in 1995. They also included it in their Eddie's Archive boxed set collection of 2002.

== Track listing ==
All tracks are written by Michael Schenker and Phil Mogg, except where noted.

Side one
No.	Title	Writer(s)	Length
1.	"Too Young to Know"	Pete Way, Mogg	3:10
2.	"Crystal Light"		3:47
3.	"Doctor Doctor"		4:10
4.	"Space Child"		4:01
5.	"Rock Bottom"		6:32

Side two
No.	Title	Writer(s)	Length
6.	"Oh My"	Schenker, Mogg, Way, Andy Parker	2:28
7.	"Time on My Hands"		4:10
8.	"Built for Comfort"	Willie Dixon	3:01
9.	"Lipstick Traces" (instrumental)	Schenker	2:20
10.	"Queen of the Deep"		5:49

2007 CD reissue bonus tracks
No.	Title	Writer(s)	Length
11.	"Sixteen" (demo)	Schenker, Mogg, Way, Parker	3:48
12.	"Oh My" (demo)	Schenker, Mogg, Way, Parker	4:12
13.	"Give Her the Gun" (unreleased single A-side)		3:58
14.	"Sweet Little Thing" (B-side of "Give Her the Gun")	Mogg, Way	3:51
15.	"Sixteen" (previously unreleased)	Schenker, Mogg, Way, Parker	3:55
16.	"Doctor Doctor" (live 6 June 1974)		4:24

=== 2019 3-CD Deluxe Edition ===
Disc one
No.	Title	Length

Disc two
No.	Title	Writer(s)	Length
1.	"Sixteen" (demo)	Schenker, Mogg, Way, Parker	3:48
2.	"Oh My" (demo)	Schenker, Mogg, Way, Parker	4:12
3.	"Give Her the Gun" (unreleased single A-side)		3:58
4.	"Sweet Little Thing" (B-side of "Give Her the Gun")	Mogg, Way	3:51
5.	"Sixteen"	Schenker, Mogg, Way, Parker	3:55
6.	"Doctor Doctor" (single edit)		2:48
7.	"Rock Bottom" (single edit)		3:38
8.	"Doctor Doctor" (Mono single edit)		2:48
9.	"Oh My" (instrumental run-through)		2:38
10.	"Sixteen" (Instrumental)		4:00
11.	"Doctor Doctor" (Take 2 Instrumental)		4:27
12.	"Rock Bottom" (Double-Tracked Vocal Take)		6:42
13.	"Time On My Hands" (work in progress version; alternate lyrics, no guitar solo)		4:20
14.	"Built For Comfort" (Master W / Full Vocal)		3:12
15.	"Lipstick Application" (Lipstick Traces Backing Track)		2:19
16.	"D Minor G Minor" (Queen of the Deep master w/ full vocal & full ending)		6:11

Disc three – Phenomenon Live, recorded live at The Electric Ballroom, Atlanta, GA, USA, 5 November 1974
No.	Title	Length
1.	"Oh My"	3:39
2.	"Doctor Doctor"	4:18
3.	"Built for Comfort"	4:17
4.	"Give Her the Gun"	5:19
5.	"Cold Turkey"	8:33
6.	"Space Child"	4:36
7.	"Rock Bottom"	8:00
8.	"Prince Kajuku"	7:08

== Personnel ==
UFO

- Phil Mogg – vocals
- Andy Parker – drums
- Pete Way – bass
- Michael Schenker – guitar

Additional personnel

- Bernie Marsden – guitar on tracks 11 and 12

Production

- Leo Lyons – producer
- Mike Bobak – engineer
- Hipgnosis – cover design, photos

== Charts ==
Chart (1974)	Peak position
Australian Albums (Kent Music Report)	76
US Bubbling Under the Top LP's (Billboard)	202

Chart (2019)	Peak position
UK Rock & Metal Albums (Official Charts)	36
