= Obsession (UFO album) =

Studio album by UFO
- Released: 23 June 1978
- Studios: C.P. McGregors, Western Avenue, Los Angeles and West 3rd Carrier Station, Beverly Hills, California with The Record Plant Mobile
- Genres: Hard rock; heavy metal
- Length: 35:59
- Label: Chrysalis
- Producer: Ron Nevison

UFO chronology
Lights Out (1977)	Obsession (1978)	Strangers in the Night (1979)

Singles from Obsession
- 1. "Cherry" Released: June 1978 (US); 2. "Only You Can Rock Me" Released: July 1978 (UK); 3. "Born to Lose" Released: 1978 (NL)

Obsession is the seventh studio album by English rock band UFO, released in 1978. This was the final studio album to feature Michael Schenker on lead guitar, until he returned to the band in 1993. A single from the album, "Only You Can Rock Me" / "Cherry", was also released in 1978. So too was the band's first three-track EP "Only You Can Rock Me", "Cherry" / "Rock Bottom", reaching No. 50 in the UK singles chart. The album was recorded at an abandoned post office in Los Angeles.

EMI's 2008 remastered edition includes three bonus live tracks, and also some writing credits are corrected. In 2024, Chrysalis released a deluxe edition on 2 CD's and 3 LP's. It features new remaster as well as an entire live show from Cleveland, remixed in 2024 for this release.

== Critical reception ==
Professional ratings
Review scores
Source	Rating
AllMusic	3/5 stars
Christgau's Record Guide	C−
Collector's Guide to Heavy Metal	8/10
The Encyclopedia of Popular Music	2/5 stars

Reviewing the LP in Christgau's Record Guide: Rock Albums of the Seventies (1981), Robert Christgau wrote: "I've admired their forward motion and facile riffs, so it's my duty to report that they've degenerated into the usual exhibitionism. Theme song: 'Lookin' Out for No. 1,' a turn of phrase that's becoming as much of a watchword in late '70s rock as 'get together' was in the late '60s." Greg Prato in his AllMusic review remarked how Obsession "indeed contain lots of prime metal cuts, but some of the material ultimately fell flat." Canadian journalist Martin Popoff described the album as "an aseptically professional, melancholy, yet finely crafted and memorable display of keyboard-powered metal", but criticized Ron Nevison's "brash, boomy live-feel production" and "the almost total lack of the band's connecting, warm hard rock".

== Track listing ==
Side one
No.	Title	Writer(s)	Length
1.	"Only You Can Rock Me"	Pete Way, Michael Schenker, Phil Mogg	4:08
2.	"Pack It Up (And Go)"	Way, Schenker, Mogg	3:14
3.	"Arbory Hill"	Schenker	1:11
4.	"Ain't No Baby"	Mogg, Paul Raymond	3:58
5.	"Lookin' Out for No. 1"	Mogg, Raymond	4:34

Side two
No.	Title	Writer(s)	Length
6.	"Hot 'n' Ready"	Schenker, Mogg	3:16
7.	"Cherry"	Way, Mogg	3:34
8.	"You Don't Fool Me"	Raymond, Andy Parker, Mogg	3:23
9.	"Lookin' Out for No. 1 (Reprise)"	Schenker, Raymond	1:14
10.	"One More for the Rodeo"	Way, Mogg	3:45
11.	"Born to Lose"	Schenker, Mogg, Raymond	3:31
Total length:			35:59

2008 EMI remastered CD reissue bonus tracks
No.	Title	Length
12.	"Hot 'n' Ready" (live In Columbus, Ohio, 17/10/78)	3:34
13.	"Pack It Up (And Go)" (live In Columbus, Ohio, 17/10/78)	3:38
14.	"Ain't No Baby" (live In Kenosha, Wisconsin, 14/10/78)	4:40
Total length:		46:57

== Personnel ==
UFO

- Phil Mogg – vocals
- Michael Schenker – guitar
- Paul Raymond – keyboards, guitar
- Pete Way – bass
- Andy Parker – drums

Production

- Ron Nevison – producer
- Mike Clink – assistant engineer
- Alan McMillan – conductor, string arrangements, string conductor
- Hipgnosis – cover art

== Charts ==
Chart (1978)	Peak position
Australian Albums (Kent Music Report)	89
Canada Top Albums/CDs (RPM)	68
Swedish Albums (Sverigetopplistan)	31
UK Albums (Official Charts)	26
US Billboard 200	41
