= Lights Out (UFO album) =

Studio album by UFO
- Released: May 1977
- Studio: AIR (London)
- Genres: Hard rock, heavy metal
- Length: 36:41
- Label: Chrysalis
- Producer: Ron Nevison

UFO chronology
No Heavy Petting (1976)	Lights Out (1977)	Obsession (1978)

Singles from Lights Out
- 1. "Alone Again Or" Released: 13 May 1977; 2. "Too Hot to Handle" Released: June 1977 (US); 3. "Try Me" Released: 1977 (US)

Professional ratings
Review scores
Source	Rating
AllMusic	4/5 stars
Collector's Guide to Heavy Metal	9/10
The Encyclopedia of Popular Music	4/5 stars

Lights Out is the sixth studio album by English rock band UFO, released in 1977. All songs are band originals except "Alone Again Or", a cover of a song by the band Love. Reaching number 23 on the Billboard 200, it is the band's highest-charting album in the United States. In the UK, it hit number 54 and stayed on the chart for two weeks.

The album was UFO's first to feature lush string arrangements, alongside more complex song structures than on previous albums. Producer Ron Nevison brought in Alan McMillan to handle the string and horn arrangements. The most notable song to feature orchestral colouring was "Love to Love". Lights Out is also the first UFO album to feature Paul Raymond on keyboards and rhythm guitar.

In 1994, a CD comprising this album and No Heavy Petting was released by BGO Records. 2008 EMI's remastered edition includes four live tracks recorded at The Roundhouse, London. The album cover erroneously states that these tracks were recorded in 1976: the correct year is 1977. EMI did, however, correct the writing credits, with Paul Raymond finally being acknowledged for his contributions.

== Music ==
According to Classic Rock Magazine: "There was an almost telepathic link here between melody and brawn."

== Legacy ==
The title track and "Love to Love" were featured in the 1999 movie Detroit Rock City. "Love to Love" was covered by Djali Zwan for the 2002 movie Spun and by Europe for their 2008 live album Almost Unplugged. An instrumental version of "Too Hot to Handle" is used at the beginning of Mark Madden's radio show on WXDX-FM in Pittsburgh, Madden being a longtime fan of UFO.

Kerrang! magazine listed the album at No.28 among the "100 Greatest Heavy Metal Albums of All Time".

Steve Harris of Iron Maiden called "Love to Love" his favourite song. "'Love to Love' is brilliantly written and constructed," observed Quireboys guitarist Guy Griffin. "It has a majesty that makes it world-class. The Quireboys covered it… and when you do that, you get to understand how good the song is."

Classic Rock Magazine said in 2021: "This is the record that set up a blueprint which was to influence many bands during the following decade."

== Track listing ==
Side one
No.	Title	Writer(s)	Length
1.	"Too Hot to Handle"	Pete Way, Phil Mogg	3:37
2.	"Just Another Suicide"	Paul Raymond, Mogg	4:58
3.	"Try Me"	Michael Schenker, Raymond, Mogg	4:49
4.	"Lights Out"	Schenker, Mogg, Andy Parker, Way	4:33

Side two
No.	Title	Writer(s)	Length
5.	"Gettin' Ready"	Schenker, Mogg	3:46
6.	"Alone Again Or" (Love cover)	Bryan MacLean	3:00
7.	"Electric Phase"	Way, Mogg, Schenker	4:20
8.	"Love to Love"	Schenker, Raymond, Mogg	7:38
Total length:			36:41

2008 CD reissue bonus tracks - Live at The Roundhouse, London 1976*
No.	Title	Length
9.	"Lights Out"	5:14
10.	"Gettin' Ready"	4:03
11.	"Love to Love"	7:15
12.	"Try Me"	4:03
Total length:		56:16

- The date of the live show stated on the album cover and booklet is incorrect. The show was on 2 April 1977, not in 1976.

=== 2024 Deluxe Edition ===
Disc one
No.	Title	Length
9.	"Too Hot to Handle (Edit)"	3:12
10.	"Alone Again Or (Acoustic Rough Studio Version)"	2:18
11.	"Try Me (7" Version)"	3:27

Disc two - Live at The Roundhouse, London, 2nd April 1977 (2024 Mix)
No.	Title	Length
1.	"Lights Out"	5:19
2.	"Gettin' Ready"	3:51
3.	"Love to Love"	7:38
4.	"On with the Action"	4:59
5.	"Doctor Doctor"	3:52
6.	"Try Me"	5:24
7.	"Too Hot to Handle"	4:48
8.	"Out in the Street"	5:24
9.	"This Kid's"	4:38
10.	"Shoot Shoot"	3:33
11.	"Rock Bottom"	9:48
12.	"Let it Roll"	5:07
13.	"C'mon Everybody"	8:34

== Personnel ==
The band

- Phil Mogg – vocals
- Michael Schenker – lead guitar
- Paul Raymond – keyboards, rhythm guitar, backing vocals
- Pete Way – bass guitar
- Andy Parker – drums

Production and cover art

- Ron Nevison – producer
- Alan McMillan – horn and string arrangements
- Hipgnosis – cover design and photographs

== Charts ==
Chart (1977)	Peak position
Swedish Albums (Sverigetopplistan)	31
UK Albums (Official Charts)	54
US Billboard 200	23

Chart (2024)	Peak position
Swiss Albums (Schweizer Hitparade)	63
