= No Heavy Petting =

Studio album by UFO
- Released: May 1976
- Recorded: 1976
- Studio: Morgan (London)
- Genre: Hard rock; heavy metal
- Length: 35:16
- Label: Chrysalis
- Producer: Leo Lyons

UFO chronology
| Force It (1975) | No Heavy Petting (1976) | Lights Out (1977) |

Singles from No Heavy Petting
- 1. "Can You Roll Her" Released: 1 July 1976 (Japan only); 2. "Highway Lady" Released: 1976 (Japan only)

Professional ratings
Review scores
| Source | Rating |
|---|---|
| AllMusic | 2.5/5 stars |
| Collector's Guide to Heavy Metal | 9/10 |
| The Encyclopedia of Popular Music | 4/5 stars |

No Heavy Petting is the fifth studio album by English rock band UFO, released in 1976. It featured a new band member, keyboard player Danny Peyronel. It was UFO's first record with a full-time keyboardist, and their first as a five-piece band. Peyronel co-wrote several of the tracks, and was only in the band for this one album. This was the last in a trilogy of UFO albums produced by Leo Lyons, the bassist for Ten Years After. "No Heavy Petting" was a rule posted in many public baths in England in the 1970s and 1980s.

In 1994, a CD including this album and Lights Out was released by BGO Records. Like many UFO CDs, it was remastered and reissued with bonus tracks in 2007.

== Track listing ==
Side one
| No. | Title | Writer(s) | Length |
|---|---|---|---|
| 1. | "Natural Thing" | Michael Schenker, Phil Mogg, Pete Way | 4:01 |
| 2. | "I'm a Loser" | Schenker, Mogg | 3:55 |
| 3. | "Can You Roll Her" | Danny Peyronel, Mogg, Andy Parker | 2:58 |
| 4. | "Belladonna" | Schenker, Mogg | 4:32 |
| 5. | "Reasons Love" | Schenker, Mogg | 3:17 |

Side two
| No. | Title | Writer(s) | Length |
|---|---|---|---|
| 6. | "Highway Lady" | Peyronel | 3:49 |
| 7. | "On with the Action" | Schenker, Mogg | 5:03 |
| 8. | "A Fool in Love" | Frankie Miller, Andy Fraser | 2:50 |
| 9. | "Martian Landscape" | Peyronel, Mogg, Parker | 5:11 |

2007 EMI remastered CD bonus tracks
| No. | Title | Writer(s) | Length |
|---|---|---|---|
| 10. | "All or Nothing" (Small Faces cover) | Ronnie Lane, Steve Marriott | 3:30 |
| 11. | "French Kisses" | UFO | 3:07 |
| 12. | "Have You Seen Me Lately Joan" | Frankie Miller | 4:00 |
| 13. | "Tonight, Tonight" | UFO | 3:17 |
| 14. | "All the Strings" | Peyronel | 5:58 |

All previously unreleased studio tracks were recorded at Morgan Studios in January 1976 except "All or Nothing" on 15 September 1975 and mixed at Abbey Road Studios in June 2007.

== Personnel ==
UFO

- Phil Mogg – vocals
- Andy Parker – drums
- Pete Way – bass
- Michael Schenker – guitar
- Danny Peyronel – keyboards, backing vocals

Production

- Leo Lyons – producer
- Mike Bobak – engineer
- Hipgnosis – cover art

== Charts ==
| Chart (1976) | Peak position |
|---|---|
| Swedish Albums (Sverigetopplistan) | 38 |
| US Billboard 200 | 169 |

| Chart (2023) | Peak position |
|---|---|
| German Albums (Offizielle Top 100) | 59 |
| Scottish Albums (OCC) | 25 |
| UK Independent Albums (OCC) | 14 |
| UK Rock & Metal Albums (OCC) | 6 |
