= Force It =

Studio album by UFO
- Released: July 1975
- Studios: Morgan and Wessex Sound, London
- Genres: Hard rock, heavy metal
- Length: 38:11
- Label: Chrysalis
- Producer: Leo Lyons

UFO chronology
Phenomenon (1974)	Force It (1975)	No Heavy Petting (1976)

Singles from Force It
- 1. "Shoot Shoot" Released: 1975 (Europe)

Force It is the fourth studio album by English rock band UFO, released in 1975. It was their first album to chart in the United States.

The album was produced by Ten Years After bass player Leo Lyons. Another Ten Years After member, Chick Churchill, played Fender Rhodes electric piano keyboard, the first use of that instrument on a UFO record.

The CD reissue was remastered at Sound Recording Technology in Cambridge in 1994.

== Album cover ==
The somewhat controversial original album cover was designed by Hipgnosis, as were almost all other UFO album covers of the 1970s. The nudity on the cover verged on breaching decency standards and the sexes of the couple in the bathtub were not known for several years. The models were later revealed to be Genesis P-Orridge and Cosey Fanni Tutti, both later of the influential industrial band Throbbing Gristle. The artwork was softened for the initial US release, making the couple in the bathtub transparent. The cover is a pun – there are multiple taps (British English) or "faucets" (US English) in the picture, which is a play on the album's title.

== Critical reception ==
Professional ratings
Review scores
Source	Rating
AllMusic	4/5 stars
Christgau's Record Guide	B−
Collector's Guide to Heavy Metal	8/10
The Encyclopedia of Popular Music	3/5 stars

Reviewing the LP in Christgau's Record Guide: Rock Albums of the Seventies (1981), Robert Christgau wrote: "Heavy metal that's not hard to take? What? Well, the whole first side moves to [sic] smartly you could almost mistake it for rock and roll." Eduardo Rivadavia, reviewer for AllMusic, wrote: "One of the band's best albums, Force It will not disappoint lovers of '70s English hard rock." Canadian journalist Martin Popoff indicated this album as the first of "the band's classic era", spinning "arresting tales of the street, all the while wrestling with and taming the monster that was heavy metal, infusing the beast with wit, subtlety, restraint and British aristocratic class."

== Track listing ==
All tracks are written by Michael Schenker and Phil Mogg, except where noted.

Side one
No.	Title	Writer(s)	Length
1.	"Let It Roll"		3:57
2.	"Shoot Shoot"	Schenker, Mogg, Pete Way, Andy Parker	3:40
3.	"High Flyer"		4:08
4.	"Love Lost Love"		3:21
5.	"Out in the Street"	Way, Mogg	5:18

Side two
No.	Title	Writer(s)	Length
6.	"Mother Mary"	Schenker, Mogg, Way, Parker	3:49
7.	"Too Much of Nothing"	Way	4:02
8.	"Dance Your Life Away"		3:35
9.	"This Kid's" (including "Between the Walls", written by Schenker)		6:13

2007 CD reissue bonus tracks
No.	Title	Length
10.	"A Million Miles" (previously unreleased)	4:49
11.	"Mother Mary" (live at the Paris Theatre, London, England on 11 December 1975 for BBC Radio 1)	4:04
12.	"Out in the Street" (live at the Paris Theatre, London, England on 11 December 1975 for BBC Radio 1)	5:12
13.	"Shoot Shoot" (live at the Paris Theatre, London, England on 11 December 1975 for BBC Radio 1)	3:48
14.	"Let It Roll" (live at The Roundhouse, Chalk Farm, London, England on 25 April 1976)	4:59
15.	"This Kid's" (live at The Roundhouse, Chalk Farm, London, England on 25 April 1976)	4:19

=== 2021 2-CD Deluxe Edition ===
Disc one bonus track
No.	Title	Length
10.	"A Million Miles"	4:49

Disc two
No.	Title	Length
1.	"Intro" (Live at The Record Plant, Los Angeles, CA, 1975)	1:12
2.	"Let It Roll" (Live at The Record Plant, Los Angeles, CA, 1975)	5:01
3.	"Doctor Doctor" (Live at The Record Plant, Los Angeles, CA, 1975)	5:15
4.	"Oh My" (Live at The Record Plant, Los Angeles, CA, 1975)	4:16
5.	"Built for Comfort" (Live at The Record Plant, Los Angeles, CA, 1975)	4:41
6.	"Out in the Street" (Live at The Record Plant, Los Angeles, CA, 1975)	5:28
7.	"Space Child" (Live at The Record Plant, Los Angeles, CA, 1975)	4:43
8.	"Mother Mary" (Live at The Record Plant, Los Angeles, CA, 1975)	4:42
9.	"All or Nothing" (Live at The Record Plant, Los Angeles, CA, 1975)	4:39
10.	"This Kid's" (Live at The Record Plant, Los Angeles, CA, 1975)	4:38
11.	"Shoot Shoot" (Live at The Record Plant, Los Angeles, CA, 1975)	3:50
12.	"Rock Bottom" (Live at The Record Plant, Los Angeles, CA, 1975)	9:08

The vinyl release of the 2021 remaster includes the live Record Plant concert, but lacks the studio bonus track "A Million Miles."

== Personnel ==
UFO

- Phil Mogg – vocals
- Andy Parker – drums
- Pete Way – bass
- Michael Schenker – guitar

Additional musicians

- Chick Churchill – keyboards
- James Dewar – backing vocals

Production

- Leo Lyons – producer
- Mike Bobak, Mike Thompson – engineers
- Hipgnosis – cover art

== Charts ==
Chart (1975)	Peak position
German Albums (Offizielle Top 100)	35
US Billboard 200	71

Chart (2021)	Peak position
Scottish Albums (Official Charts)	33
Swiss Albums (Schweizer Hitparade)	59
UK Independent Albums (Official Charts)	19
UK Rock & Metal Albums (Official Charts)	9
