= Strangers in the Night (UFO album) =

Live album by UFO
- Released: January 1979
- Recorded: 13–18 October 1978
- Venues: International Amphitheatre, Chicago; Louisville Gardens, Louisville; Record Plant Mobile Studio
- Genres: Hard rock; heavy metal
- Length: 69:13
- Label: Chrysalis
- Producer: Ron Nevison

UFO chronology
Obsession (1978)	Strangers in the Night (1979)	No Place to Run (1980)

Singles from Strangers in the Night
- 1. "Doctor Doctor" Released: January 1979; 2. "Shoot Shoot" Released: March 1979

Professional ratings
Review scores
Source	Rating
AllMusic	4.5/5 stars
Collector's Guide to Heavy Metal	8/10
The Encyclopedia of Popular Music	4/5 stars
The Rolling Stone Album Guide	2/5 stars

Strangers in the Night is a live album by British hard rock band UFO, released in January 1979, through Chrysalis.

The original double LP was recorded at shows in Chicago, Illinois, and Louisville, Kentucky in October 1978. Chicago, recalled bassist Pete Way, "was the first city that we could play arenas in. We'd opened there for Kiss and their audience took to us. Every time we went to Chicago, it became an event." (UFO actually opened for Kiss in Nashville, on the Destroyer Tour. UFO and Kiss were both support acts for Marc Bolan's T. Rex at the Aragon Ballroom in Chicago in 1974.)

Some of the songs were recorded at a show on UFO's tour with Blue Öyster Cult.

Guitarist Michael Schenker left the band during the tour and was replaced, for a second time, by Lone Star's Paul Chapman. It has been rumoured that Schenker refused to record overdubs for the album, which would make this an accurate account of his live guitar work. Schenker has spoken of disappointment with the tracks chosen, saying, "There were better takes they could've used."

Strangers in the Night peaked at No.7 in the UK and No.42 in the US.

Critics and fans cite it as one of the greatest live rock albums. Kerrang! ranked it No.47 among the "100 Greatest Heavy Metal Albums of All Time". Slash, guitarist for Guns N' Roses, hailed it is his favorite live album. Founding UFO bassist Pete Way and drummer Andy Parker say it is their favorite UFO record.

The faces on the album's artwork were, said Pete Way, "people from [design company] Hipgnosis, I think. Because it was a live album, they tried to make it look like a crowd of people."

Two live EPs in 1979 also proved successful. In February, "Doctor Doctor" (taken from the album), backed with "On with the Action" (recorded on the same 1978 US tour) and the studio cut "Try Me", reached No.35 in the UK Singles Chart; this was the first time the band had made the UK Top 40. "Shoot Shoot", backed with "Only You Can Rock Me" and "I'm a Loser", hit No.48 in the UK in April.

== Reissue ==
In 1999, EMI reissued Strangers in the Night as an expanded edition featuring two bonus songs, "Hot 'n' Ready" and "Cherry". The announcement at the beginning of this version indicates the first track was recorded in Chicago, but this was not so according to the booklet of the 2008 remaster (the songs are pointed as recorded in Youngstown, Ohio, 15 October 1978 and Cleveland, Ohio, 16 October 1978 accordingly). The audience noise is from Chicago and the introduction for the CD was from the Chicago show. At 2:40 into the track "Lights Out", Phil Mogg sings, "Lights out, lights out Chicago," followed by an audience roar. "Mother Mary" and "This Kid's" are studio tracks with crowd noise added, as outlined in the 2008 remaster booklet. The track listing was reordered to more accurately reflect UFO's set at the time. The track list of the 2008 version is identical to the 1999 version, with no additional tracks or setlist modifications.

Outtakes from the 1978 tour have also been released. A live version of "On with the Action" from the "Doctor Doctor" single was reissued on UFO: The Chrysalis Years (1973-79) in 2011. "Ain't No Baby", recorded in Kenosha, WI, and "Pack It Up (And Go)", recorded in Columbus, OH, appeared on Hot 'n' Live: The Chrysalis Live Anthology 1974-1983 in 2013. The Japanese version of this release includes a further version of "Pack It Up (And Go)", recorded in Youngstown, OH.

On Record Store Day 2020, Chrysalis was to release Live in Youngstown 1978, one of the six concerts recorded for Strangers in the Night.

== Track listing ==
=== Original LP ===
Side one
No.	Title	Length
1.	"Natural Thing" (Michael Schenker, Phil Mogg, Pete Way)	3:57
2.	"Out in the Street" (Way, Mogg)	5:07
3.	"Only You Can Rock Me" (Way, Schenker, Mogg)	4:08
4.	"Doctor Doctor" (Schenker, Mogg)	4:42

Side two
No.	Title	Length
5.	"Mother Mary" (Schenker, Mogg, Way, Andy Parker)	3:25
6.	"This Kid's" (Schenker, Mogg)	4:37
7.	"Love to Love" (Schenker, Mogg)	7:58

Side three
No.	Title	Length
8.	"Lights Out" (Schenker, Mogg, Parker, Way)	5:23
9.	"Rock Bottom" (Schenker, Mogg)	11:08

Side four
No.	Title	Length
10.	"Too Hot to Handle" (Way, Mogg)	4:26
11.	"I'm a Loser" (Schenker, Mogg)	4:13
12.	"Let It Roll" (Schenker, Mogg)	4:48
13.	"Shoot Shoot" (Schenker, Mogg, Way, Parker)	4:07

1999 reissue
No.	Title	Length
1.	"Hot 'n' Ready" (Schenker, Mogg)	3:26
2.	"Cherry" (Way, Mogg)	3:44
3.	"Let It Roll"	4:48
4.	"Love to Love"	7:58
5.	"Natural Thing"	3:57
6.	"Out in the Street"	5:07
7.	"Only You Can Rock Me"	4:08
8.	"Mother Mary"	3:25
9.	"This Kid's"	4:37
10.	"Doctor Doctor"	4:42
11.	"I'm a Loser"	4:13
12.	"Lights Out"	5:23
13.	"Rock Bottom"	11:08
14.	"Too Hot to Handle"	4:26
15.	"Shoot Shoot"	4:07

=== 2020 Deluxe Edition ===
Disc one
No.	Title	Length
1.	"Natural Thing"	3:57
2.	"Out in the Street"	5:07
3.	"Only You Can Rock Me"	4:08
4.	"Doctor Doctor"	4:42
5.	"Mother Mary"	3:25
6.	"This Kid's"	4:37
7.	"Love to Love"	7:58

Disc two
No.	Title	Length
1.	"Lights Out"	5:23
2.	"Rock Bottom"	11:08
3.	"Too Hot to Handle"	4:26
4.	"I'm a Loser"	4:13
5.	"Let It Roll"	4:48
6.	"Shoot Shoot"	4:07

Disc three - (Live at the International Amphitheater, Chicago, Illinois, USA, 13 October 1978)

1. "Hot 'n' Ready" (Schenker, Mogg) - 3:54
2. "Pack It Up (And Go)" (Way, Schenker, Mogg) - 3:15
3. "Cherry" (Way, Mogg) - 3:32
4. "Let It Roll" (Schenker, Mogg) - 4:29
5. "Love to Love" (Schenker, Mogg) - 8:01
6. "Only You Can Rock Me" (Way, Schenker, Mogg) - 4:15
7. "Ain't No Baby" (Mogg, Paul Raymond) - 4:07
8. "Out in the Street" (Way, Mogg) - 5:04
9. "Doctor Doctor" (Schenker, Mogg) - 4:52
10. "Lights Out" (Schenker, Mogg, Parker, Way) - 5:12
11. "Rock Bottom" (Schenker, Mogg) - 10:13
12. "Too Hot to Handle" (Way, Mogg) - 4:24
13. "Shoot Shoot" (Schenker, Mogg, Way, Parker) - 3:59

Disc four - (Live at the Kenosha Ice Arena, Wisconsin, USA, 14 October 1978)

1. "Hot 'n' Ready" (Schenker, Mogg) - 3:35
2. "Pack It Up (And Go)" (Way, Schenker, Mogg) - 3:15
3. "Cherry" (Way, Mogg) - 3:47
4. "Let It Roll" (Schenker, Mogg) - 4:40
5. "Love to Love" (Schenker, Mogg) - 7:46
6. "Only You Can Rock Me" (Way, Schenker, Mogg) - 4:03
7. "Ain't No Baby" (Mogg, Raymond) - 4:13
8. "Out in the Street" (Way, Mogg) - 5:00
9. "Doctor Doctor" (Schenker, Mogg) - 4:52
10. "Lights Out" (Schenker, Mogg, Parker, Way) - 5:03
11. "Rock Bottom" (Schenker, Mogg) - 10:58
12. "Too Hot to Handle" (Way, Mogg) - 4:30

Disc five - (Live at the Tomorrow Club, Youngstown, Ohio, USA, 15 October 1978)

1. "Intro / Hot 'n' Ready" (Schenker, Mogg) - 3:49
2. "Pack It Up (And Go)" (Way, Schenker, Mogg) - 3:38
3. "Cherry" (Way, Mogg) - 3:41
4. "Let It Roll" (Schenker, Mogg) - 4:41
5. "Love to Love" (Schenker, Mogg) - 7:55
6. "Natural Thing" (Schenker, Mogg, Way) - 3:27
7. "Out in the Street" (Way, Mogg) - 5:08
8. "Only You Can Rock Me" (Way, Schenker, Mogg) - 4:06
9. "On with the Action" (Schenker, Mogg) - 4:47
10. "Doctor Doctor" (Schenker, Mogg) - 4:51
11. "Lights Out" (Schenker, Mogg, Parker, Way) - 5:08
12. "Rock Bottom" (Schenker, Mogg) - 10:24
13. "Too Hot to Handle" (Way, Mogg) - 4:35
14. "Shoot Shoot" (Schenker, Mogg, Way, Parker) - 3:46

Disc six - (Live at the Agora Theater, Cleveland, Ohio, USA, 16 October 1978)

1. "Hot 'n' Ready" (Schenker, Mogg) - 3:57
2. "Pack It Up (And Go)" (Way, Schenker, Mogg) - 3:22
3. "Cherry" (Way, Mogg) - 4:00
4. "Let It Roll" (Schenker, Mogg) - 4:47
5. "Love to Love" (Schenker, Mogg) - 8:24
6. "Natural Thing" (Schenker, Mogg, Way) - 3:32
7. "Out in the Street" (Way, Mogg) - 5:16
8. "Only You Can Rock Me" (Way, Schenker, Mogg) - 4:16
9. "On with the Action" (Schenker, Mogg) - 4:56
10. "Doctor Doctor" (Schenker, Mogg) - 4:51
11. "I'm a Loser" (Schenker, Mogg) - 4:12
12. "Lights Out" (Schenker, Mogg, Parker, Way) - 5:25
13. "Rock Bottom" (Schenker, Mogg) - 11:25
14. "Too Hot to Handle" (Way, Mogg) - 5:41
15. "Shoot Shoot" (Schenker, Mogg, Way, Parker) - 4:07

Disc seven - (Live at the Agora Ballroom, Columbus, Ohio, USA, 17 October 1978)

1. "Hot 'n' Ready" (Schenker, Mogg) - 3:50
2. "Pack It Up (And Go)" (Way, Schenker, Mogg) - 3:36
3. "Cherry" (Way, Mogg) - 3:59
4. "Let It Roll" (Schenker, Mogg) - 5:07
5. "Love to Love" (Schenker, Mogg) - 8:42
6. "Natural Thing" (Schenker, Mogg, Way) - 3:56
7. "Out in the Street" (Way, Mogg) - 5:44
8. "Too Hot to Handle" (Way, Mogg) - 5:38
9. "I'm a Loser" (Schenker, Mogg) - 4:44
10. "On with the Action" (Schenker, Mogg) - 5:04
11. "Doctor Doctor" (Schenker, Mogg) - 5:30
12. "Lights Out" (Schenker, Mogg, Parker, Way) - 5:48
13. "Rock Bottom" (Schenker, Mogg) - 13:58
14. "Shoot Shoot" (Schenker, Mogg, Way, Parker) - 4:11

Disc eight - (Live at the Louisville Gardens, Louisville, Kentucky, USA, 18 October 1978)

1. "Hot 'n' Ready" (Schenker, Mogg) - 3:46
2. "Pack It Up (And Go)" (Way, Schenker, Mogg) - 3:29
3. "Cherry" (Way, Mogg) - 4:07
4. "Let It Roll" (Schenker, Mogg) - 4:46
5. "Love to Love" (Schenker, Mogg) - 8:08
6. "Natural Thing" (Schenker, Mogg, Way) - 3:39
7. "Out in the Street" (Way, Mogg) - 5:32
8. "Only You Can Rock Me" (Way, Schenker, Mogg) - 4:32
9. "On with the Action" (Schenker, Mogg) - 5:19
10. "Doctor Doctor" (Schenker, Mogg) - 5:05
11. "I'm a Loser" (Schenker, Mogg) - 4:26
12. "Lights Out" (Schenker, Mogg, Parker, Way) - 5:50
13. "Rock Bottom" (Schenker, Mogg) - 11:18
14. "Too Hot to Handle" (Way, Mogg) - 4:32
15. "Shoot Shoot" (Schenker, Mogg, Way, Parker) - 4:09

Note: the first five tracks of each of these consecutive shows was consistent, after which the band played somewhere between seven and ten more additional songs. A mapping of each of the show differences:

Chicago	Kenosha	Youngstown	Cleveland	Columbus	Louisville
Only You Can Rock Me	Only You Can Rock Me	Natural Thing	Natural Thing	Natural Thing	Natural Thing
Ain’t No Baby	Ain’t No Baby	Out In the Street	Out In the Street	Out In the Street	Out In the Street
Out In the Street	Out In the Street	Only You Can Rock Me	Only You Can Rock Me	Too Hot To Handle	Only You Can Rock Me
Doctor Doctor	Doctor Doctor	On With The Action	On With The Action	I'm A Loser	On With The Action
Lights Out	Lights Out	Doctor Doctor	Doctor Doctor	On With The Action	Doctor Doctor
Rock Bottom	Rock Bottom	Lights Out	I'm A Loser	Doctor Doctor	I'm A Loser
Too Hot To Handle	Too Hot To Handle	Rock Bottom	Lights Out	Lights Out	Lights Out
Shoot Shoot		Too Hot To Handle	Rock Bottom	Rock Bottom	Rock Bottom
		Shoot Shoot	Too Hot To Handle	Shoot Shoot	Too Hot To Handle
			Shoot Shoot		Shoot Shoot

== Personnel ==
UFO

- Phil Mogg – vocals
- Michael Schenker – lead guitar
- Paul Raymond – keyboards, rhythm guitar, backing vocals
- Pete Way – bass guitar
- Andy Parker – drums

Production

- Ron Nevison – producer, engineer
- Mike Clink – assistant engineer
- Brian Chubb – live sound engineer
- Alan McMillan – horn arrangements, string arrangements
- Hipgnosis – artwork

== Charts ==
Chart (1979)	Peak position
Canada Top Albums/CDs (RPM)	48
UK Albums (Official Charts)	7
US Billboard 200	42

Chart (2020–2021)	Peak position
Belgian Albums (Ultratop Wallonia)	87
German Albums (Offizielle Top 100)	69
Scottish Albums (Official Charts)	32
Swiss Albums (Schweizer Hitparade)	98
UK Independent Albums (Official Charts)	14

== Certification ==
Region	Certification	Certified units/sales
United Kingdom (BPI)	Silver	60,000^{^}
^{^} Shipments figures based on certification alone.
