= Andy Parker (drummer) =

British drummer (born 1952)

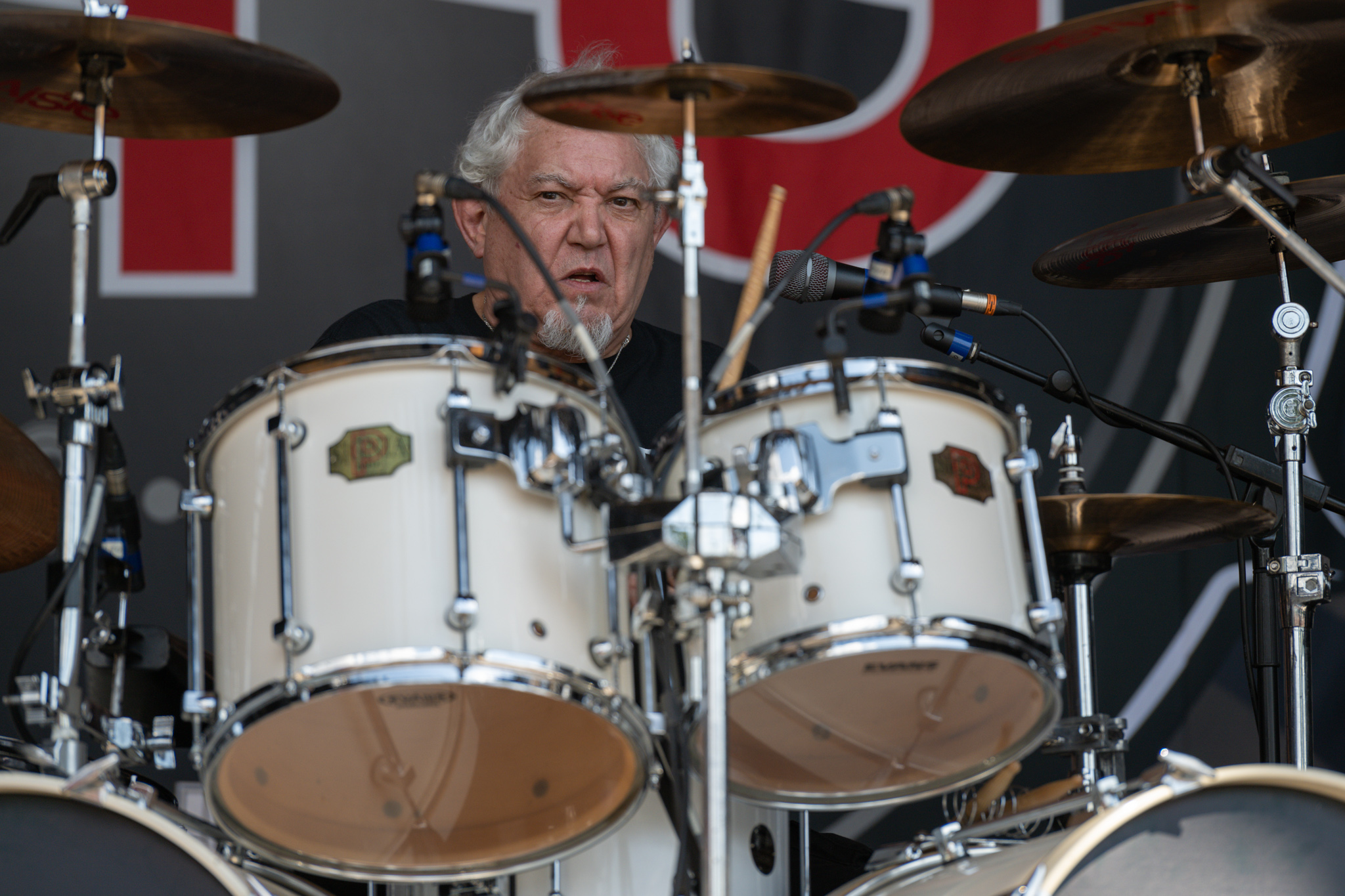
- Parker performing with UFO in 2022

Background information
- Born: Andrew Maynard Parker; 21 March 1952 (age 74); Cheshunt, Hertfordshire, England
- Genres: Hard rock, heavy metal
- Occupation: Musician
- Instrument: Drums
- Years active: 1969–present
- Formerly of: UFO, Waysted

Andrew Maynard Parker (born 21 March 1952) is a British drummer best known as a founding member and drummer of the hard rock band UFO.

== Career ==
In mid-1969, he met Phil Mogg, Pete Way, and Mick Bolton, who had a band called Hocus Pocus and were looking for a new drummer. Parker auditioned and got the job. Soon after, the band renamed to UFO and signed with the Beacon Records label. Parker was unable to sign the contract at the time, as he was only 17. His parents refused to sign for him, and he had to wait until his 18th birthday to sign. Later, as UFO was gaining momentum, Parker and Mogg started having "run-ins" with Bolton and fired him shortly after. Parker, Mogg, and Way then needed a guitarist and recruited German future virtuoso Michael Schenker.

The group disbanded in 1983, and for two years afterward (1984–1985), Parker played in Way's group Waysted, and appeared on their first and only extended play Waysted (1984). UFO then re-formed two years later without Parker. He rejoined UFO in 1993, left again in 1995, and rejoined in 2005, remaining until the band's fourth breakup in April 2024.

== Personal life ==
Parker was born in Cheshunt, Hertfordshire. He began drumming at seven and purchased his first drum kit in 1965. By 1969, he and friend Steve Casey had formed Aurora Borealis, a blues band. He had medical problems between late 2005 and early 2007, and his spot in UFO was briefly filled by Jason Bonham, until his medical issues were taken care of. He lives, together with his wife, Jo McDonnell, in Granbury, Texas. Parker's daughter from his first marriage, Lindsay Parker, is a former American child actress, and current children's book author.
