= Sammy Drain =

American guitarist (1945–2016)

- Born: Samuel Lee Drain; March 13, 1945; United States
- Died: July 22, 2016 (aged 71)
- Genres: Blues, rock, R&B
- Occupations: Musician, actor
- Instrument: Guitar
- Years active: 1960s–2016
- Formerly of: Jimi Hendrix, Septimus

Sammy Drain (March 13, 1945 – July 22, 2016) was an American guitarist based in Seattle. He also was a friend of the rock guitarist Jimi Hendrix and jammed with him before Hendrix found fame. During his lifetime, Drain was a living link to Hendrix's youth. During his career, Drain played with musicians such as Albert Collins, Buddy Miles, Bobby Womack and Stevie Wonder. Drain was also a photographer, actor, and the co-founder of the Seattle Blues Society.

== Early years and background ==
Samuel Lee Drain was born to parents Andrew and Carrie Drain on March 13, 1945.

He started playing guitar around the age of thirteen. Drain also played keyboards and drums.

He was a local neighborhood and school friend of Jimi Hendrix who hung out with him and knew the family well. When they were young, both Drain and Hendrix got up to some mischief. Hendrix was proud of his Cherokee ancestry and liking the Native American footwear, both Drain and Hendrix each lifted a pair of moccasins. They also played instruments and jammed together. Drain and Hendrix experimented by trading licks and writing songs etc. Drain had played at some of the same clubs that Hendrix played in. Drain's influences were B. B. King, Ray Charles, Muddy Waters, Albert King and Freddie King.

== Later years ==
=== 1990s ===
Drain was instrumental in having a Jimi Hendrix Day recognized. He approached the mayor of Seattle Norm Rice and talked to him about it. The mayor, knowing the contribution to music Hendrix had made, readily agreed and on November 27, 1992, which would have been the 50th birthday for the guitarist, Mayor Rice issued a proclamation making it Jimi Hendrix Day. Some years later, Drain was recognized for his musical contributions as well, and a Sammy Drain Day was proclaimed in Seattle.

=== 2000s ===
Drain was a regular player and the main blues artist at Thompson's Point of View at 23rd and Union. The restaurant had a problem with criminal activity taking place outside the premises which resulted in customers being frightened away. One day, a scuffle broke out in the club and Drain was nearly shot. Consequently, he left the venue. He was interviewed for the 2004 documentary about Hendrix, Jimi Hendrix: By Those Who Knew Him Best, which also featured his brother Leon Hendrix and Octavia inventor Roger Mayer.

In December 2003, Sammy Drain & Company were playing at Wazobia.

In 2004, it was decreed by King County Council member Larry Gossett that March 13 was "Sammy Drain Day". In November 2010, it was announced that along with the Leon Hendrix band, Joe Doria of McTuff, Jabril, Shawn Smith of Brad, Brandon Storms, Barrett Martin of Screaming Trees, and Drain were to play the Goodfoot Lounge on November 20 for Jimi Hendrix's 68th Birthday Bash.

In 2012, he was booked to play at Jimi Hendrix's 70th birthday party. The event featured Septimus, Robb Lawrence, Stacey Stanford, Ten Twenty, Ashley Holscher and Isaiah Bush.

== Death and legacy ==
During his time, he played with the following : Albert Collins, Con Funk Shun, Buddy Miles, Bobby Womack, and Stevie Wonder. He also did some acting for a while, and appeared in television shows such as L.A. Law. He also served as a mentor and teacher to young people of both Caucasian and African American backgrounds, teaching them about the guitar, his passion in music and the blues. Sammy Drain died on July 22, 2016, at age 71.

== Filmography ==
=== Television shows ===
- L.A. Law
- Miami Vice
- Hill Street Blues
- Growing Pains
- My Sister Sam

=== Documentary ===
- Jimi Hendrix, the Uncut Story
- Jimi Hendrix: By Those Who Knew Him Best - 2004
- Jimi Hendrix, The Complete Story - 2007

== Discography ==
- Sammy Drain
- Once Bitten
