= Leon Hendrix =

Brother of Jimi Hendrix (born 1948)

- Born: Leon Morris Hendrix; January 13, 1948 (age 78); Seattle, Washington, U.S.
- Genres: Hard rock, blues rock
- Occupations: Musician, painter, songwriter
- Instruments: Guitar, vocals
- Years active: 2006–present

Leon Morris Hendrix (born January 13, 1948) is an American painter, songwriter, and musician. Although better known for his artwork, he began playing the guitar in 2002 and has since released multiple albums. He is the younger brother of blues rock guitarist Jimi Hendrix.

== Personal life ==
He suffered from drug addiction and he spent time in prison for minor offenses.

He is married and is the father of six and grandfather of four.

Hendrix was employed for many years as an expert draftsman by Boeing. In recent years Hendrix has been attempting to make a living from music and art. The Leon Hendrix Band released two albums, Keeper of the Flame in 2006, as well as the earlier Seattle Rain. In 2012, Hendrix published a biography of his brother titled Jimi Hendrix: A Brother's Story. It was co-written by Adam Mitchell and published by St. Martin's Press.

== Estate dispute ==
When Leon's father, Al, died in 2002, his will left control of the company Experience Hendrix, which controls the rights to Jimi Hendrix's estate, to Al's adopted daughter, Janie Hendrix, and his nephew, Robert Hendrix. Leon sued to have his father's will overturned but in 2004 the court ruled that Leon "was not entitled to anything from his father's will, other than a single gold record left to him when his father died in 2002."

== Documentary ==
Leon appeared in the 2004 documentary about his brother, Jimi Hendrix: By Those Who Knew Him Best, that also featured musician Sammy Drain and Octavia inventor Roger Mayer.

== Later years ==
In 2019, Leon and cousin Riki Hendrix, with members of the Steve Miller Band (Greg Douglass) were booked to play at the Full Circle Saloon on 8528 Magnolia Avenue in Santee.

In 2021, Hendrix released his album If You Need a Friend. The title song was co-written by Brin Addison. The album is a mixture of genres from psychedelic rock to funk and blues. Seattle artist Annie O’Neill also sings on the album. It also features the song, "Crying from them Blues.

== Discography ==
Album
Release	Catalogue	Year	Notes
Seattle Rain		2002	
Keeper Of the Flame	LHMKEEPER 1377	2006	
If You Need a Friend		2021	

Guest
Act	Release	Catalogue	Year	Notes
Veronica Vitale	"Under the Sky of Another Dream"		2014	guitar player for the music single
