= The Electric Lady Studio Guitar =

Sculpture in Seattle, Washington, U.S.

- The sculpture in 2022
- Year: 1997
- Type: Sculpture
- Medium: Bronze
- Subject: Jimi Hendrix
- Location: Seattle, Washington, United States; 47°36′55.8″N 122°19′14.5″W

The Electric Lady Studio Guitar is a life-size bronze sculpture of Jimi Hendrix by Daryl Smith installed at the intersection of Broadway and Pine Street in the Capitol Hill neighborhood of Seattle, Washington, in the United States.

== Description and history ==
The statue depicts Hendrix playing a Stratocaster. Visit Seattle, a private nonprofit marketing organization, includes the sculpture in its list of African American Heritage Sites.

The sculpture is part of a collection of statues on Capitol Hill including Chuck Berry, Buddy Holly, and Elvis Presley. The guitars featured with the statues were part of an "alternative corporate art collection" formed by Michael J. Malone, founder of AEI Music Corporation (now known as DMX) and Hunters Capital. The statues are currently all owned and maintained by Hunters Capital.

The work was vandalized with graffiti on September 18, 2013, the 43rd anniversary of Hendrix's death.
