= Roger Mayer (engineer) =

Electrical engineer most known for designing the Octavia effect pedal

Roger Mayer is an electrical engineer who developed several electric guitar effects, including the Octavia, a fuzz effects pedal which also doubled signal frequency, with a sound that was not attainable by simply connecting an octave pedal and a fuzz pedal together. The effect was popularized by Jimi Hendrix, and can be heard during the solos on the song "Purple Haze".

The Octavia, as well as several other effects, are still being produced under Roger Mayer's name, plus a range of innovative studio recording equipment.

== Background ==
Mayer was originally an acoustic engineer working for the British Admiralty on underwater research projects. At a time when guitar effects were virtually unknown, he designed and built fuzz boxes for leading English guitarists such as Big Jim Sullivan, Jimmy Page, and Jeff Beck. His effects can be heard on P.J. Proby singles such as "Hold Me" (1964) and on numerous Yardbirds tracks.

Mayer was awarded 'Innovator of the Year Award 2018' by Vintage Guitar magazine not for a particular product, for his work and design across the board.

=== Jimi Hendrix ===
Just having turned 21, Mayer saw Hendrix playing live and in his words was "blown away by his live show". It was after one of Hendrix's shows at the Bag O’Nails club which was in Soho, London. After introducing himself backstage and talking in-depth about tone and a desire to create a totally different sound, he was invited by the guitarist to a gig the following week. Via a small amp back stage, Hendrix listened to the Octavia and was really impressed and excited by what he heard. Mayer was invited by Hendrix to overdub the solos on the songs "Purple Haze" and "Fire" which took place at the Olympic Studio, and working on tones and designing custom effects to realize the sounds Hendrix 'heard' in his head. His designs can be heard on the albums Axis: Bold as Love and Electric Ladyland.

=== Other artists ===
Mayer worked with many other artists from The Isley Brothers to Bob Marley. He also co-built a pioneering early synth for Stevie Wonder.

Since the 1990s, Tom Principato has enjoyed ongoing endorsement deals with Roger Mayer effects pedals.

== Documentary ==
Mayer appeared in the 2004 documentary about Jimi Hendrix, Jimi Hendrix: By Those Who Knew Him Best that also featured Leon Hendrix and Seattle guitarist Sammy Drain.
