= Octave effect =

Type of audio effects unit

C Major scale with octave-down effect

Fuzz, distortion and octaver (electric guitar)

Octave effect boxes are a type of special effects unit which mix the input signal with a synthesized signal whose musical tone is an octave lower or higher than the original.

== Use of octave effects ==
Octave pedals can be used in conjunction with fuzz (see octafuzz) and/or distortion. It can be used on guitar to make it sound more aggressive (such as the lead-in solo by Prince on "When Doves Cry") or sound like a bass. CKY are well known for using octave effects in their music, most notably the song "96 Quite Bitter Beings". The song "Seven Nation Army" by The White Stripes features an octave pedal on electric guitar, simulating the sound of a bass.
