= Octavia (effects pedal) =

Designed for Jimi Hendrix

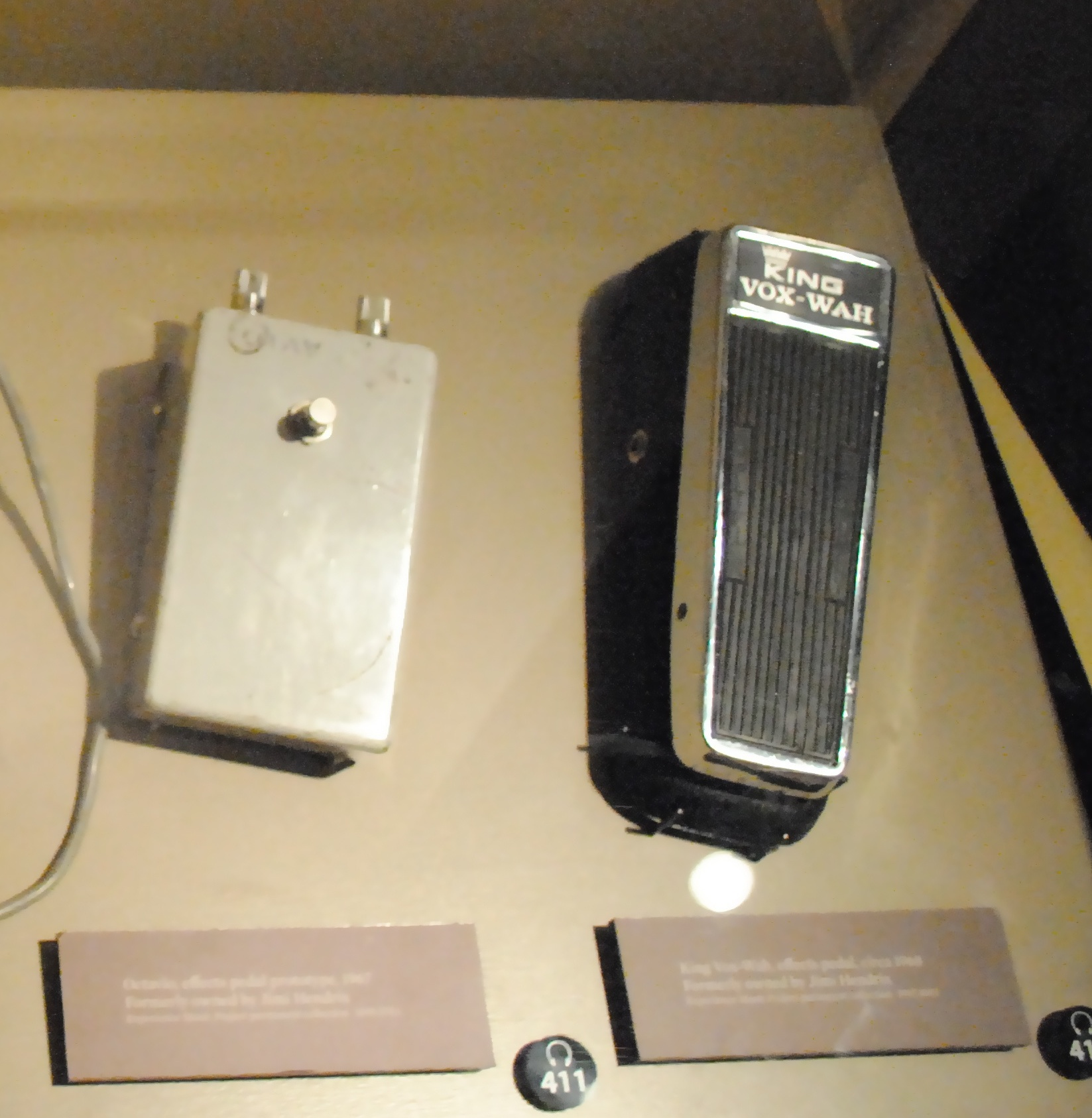
Octavia and Vox Wah

The Octavia is an effects pedal made by Roger Mayer. First produced in 1967, early versions of the unit doubled the input signal from an electric guitar one octave higher in pitch. Jimi Hendrix popularized the Octavia, combining it with fuzz distortion pedals on songs like "Purple Haze", with later versions incorporating octave and fuzz effects into a single enclosure. As Mayer did not initially release the Octavia commercially, several companies began producing similar pedals in the 1970s, and octave-fuzz went on to become a common style of effect.

== Effect ==
A song played with an octavia and a tube distortion pedal.

The Octavia consisted of an analog electronic circuit, which included a frequency doubler, envelope generator, and amplitude modulator, together with additional frequency-shaping filter circuitry. The effect generated varied depending on use. For example, a clean tone from an electric guitar produced ring modulated overtones (as heard on the guitar solo in "Who Knows" by Jimi Hendrix.)

== History ==
Mayer first produced the Octavia in early 1967, having previously made treble boosters and fuzz pedals for friends on the local London music scene like Jeff Beck and Jimmy Page. Page was uninterested in Mayer's new pedal, so Mayer showed it to Jimi Hendrix, a newcomer to the scene who was impressed. Three weeks after meeting Mayer, Hendrix used the Octavia on the guitar solo of "Purple Haze", with Hendrix's manager Chas Chandler forbidding further experimentation with the effect, deeming it "too far out for public consumption". Mayer subsequently became a studio and touring technician for Hendrix and during this time produced only a handful of Octavias for Hendrix and others upon request. Mayer consulted with Hendrix on numerous revisions to the pedal's design over the course of 1967, with some versions only lasting a week before the pair moved on. As Mayer revised the Octavia circuit, he also produced and revised fuzz pedals meant to be used in tandem with it. For Axis: Bold as Love, Hendrix extensively used updated versions of the Octavia—or "Octavio", as Hendrix called them, as the pedals were not labeled.

Mayer toured with Hendrix in 1968 before embarking on a new career designing studio equipment in the United States. He kept in touch with Hendrix, however, and continued revising the Octavia design. In 1969, Mayer produced a limited run of five Octavias that incorporated fuzz circuits into a single enclosure, and these were given to guitarists like Syd Barrett and Peter Frampton, as well as Hendrix. The earliest clones of the Octavia made by other companies used these versions as their basis. In the mid 1970s, Mayer became more open to commercially producing the Octavia. He redesigned the pedal's case into what became known as the "rocket" enclosure and manufactured them in the U.S. for sale before returning to England in 1980. Mayer later changed the Octavia's enclosure to a more conventional rectangle format and added a tone control as part of his Vision series.
