= Vesparax =

Vesparax may refer to:

- A brand name for the drug combination secobarbital/brallobarbital/hydroxyzine, formerly used as a sedative
- In Argentina, Vesparax is a brand name for quetiapine, an atypical antipsychotic
