= Electric Lady Studios =

Recording studio in New York City

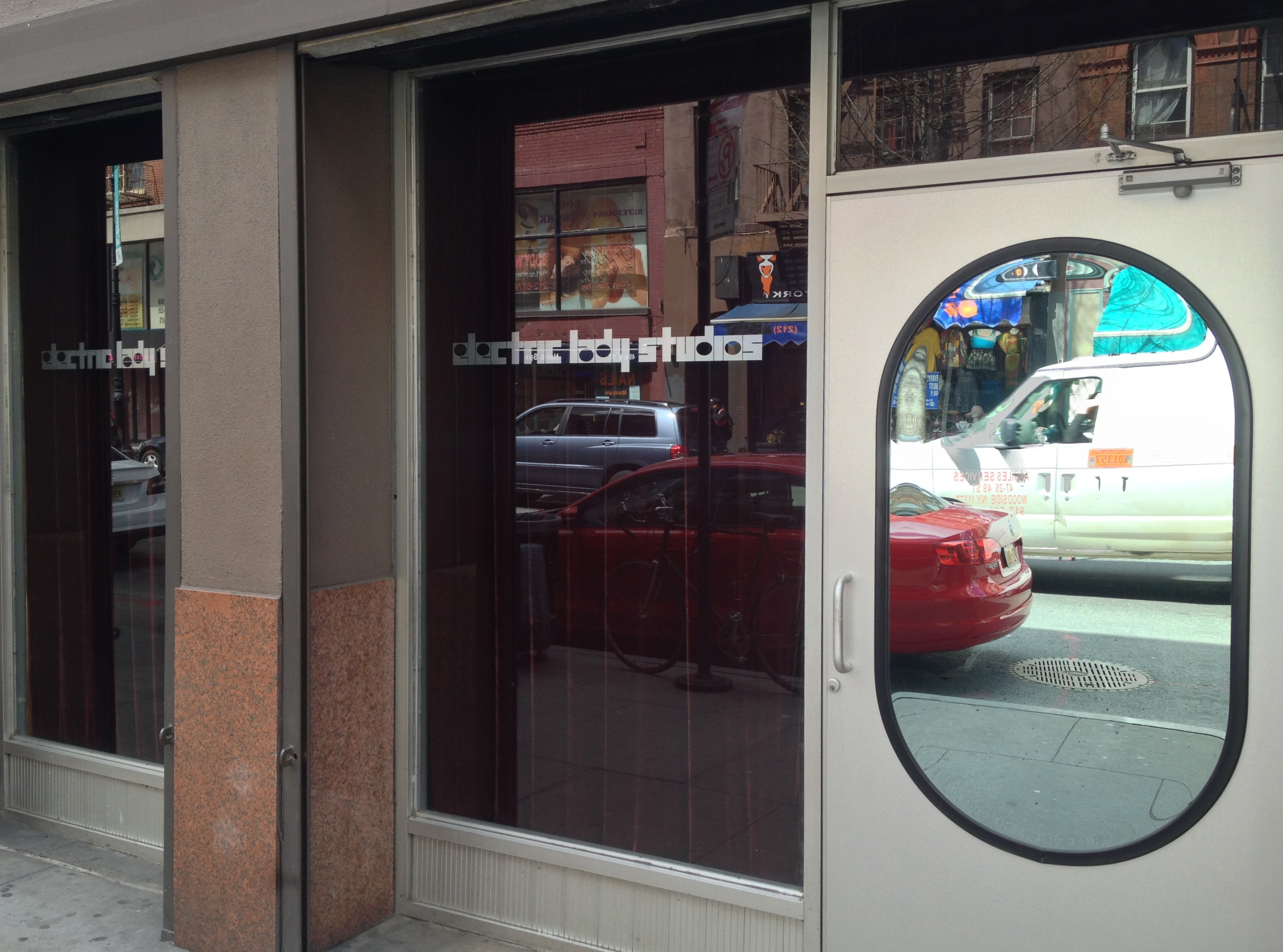
- Electric Lady Studios, front entrance, April 2013
- Interactive map of Electric Lady Studios
- Address: 52 West Eighth Street, Greenwich Village, New York City 10011
- Location: New York City
- Coordinates: 40°43′59″N 73°59′56″W
- Type: Recording studio

Construction
- Opened: August 26, 1970

Website
- https://electricladystudios.com/

Electric Lady Studios is a recording studio in Greenwich Village, New York City. It was commissioned by rock musician Jimi Hendrix in 1968 and designed by architect John Storyk and audio engineer Eddie Kramer. It was completed by 1970. Hendrix spent only ten weeks recording in Electric Lady before his death that year, but it quickly became a famed studio used by many top-selling recording artists from the 1970s onwards, including Led Zeppelin, Stevie Wonder, David Bowie and Billy Idol.

At the turn of the 21st century, Electric Lady served as a home for the innovative Soulquarians collective, but fell into financial hardship and disarray in the 2000s. Taken over and renovated by investor Keith Stoltz and studio manager Lee Foster, the studio returned to form as a popular location for mainstream artists of the 2010s, such as John Mayer, U2, Taylor Swift, Lady Gaga and Zach Bryan.

== Site ==
Before it became Electric Lady Studios, the building housed The Village Barn nightclub from 1930 to 1967. Abstract expressionist artist Hans Hofmann began lecturing there in 1938, two decades before he turned to painting full-time.

== History ==
=== 1968–1970: Jimi Hendrix and construction ===
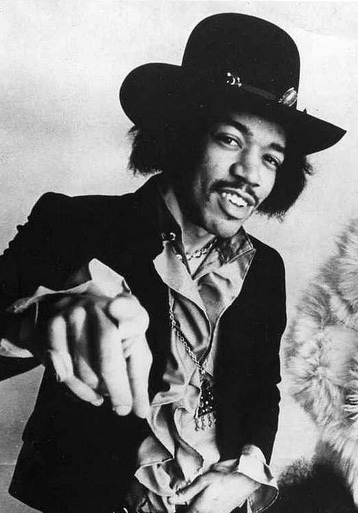
Jimi Hendrix in 1968

In 1968, Jimi Hendrix and his manager, Michael Jeffery, bought the Generation, a newly defunct nightclub in New York's Greenwich Village. Hendrix had frequently joined jam sessions at the venue, which had hosted acts as diverse and legendary as Big Brother & the Holding Company, B.B. King, Chuck Berry, Dave Van Ronk, Sly & the Family Stone, and John Fahey. Hendrix had planned to resuscitate the nightclub, but was persuaded by advisors Eddie Kramer and Jim Marron to convert the space into a professional recording studio. Studio fees for the lengthy Electric Ladyland sessions had been astronomical, and Hendrix was constantly in search of a recording environment that suited him.

Architect and acoustician John Storyk oversaw the conversion. Construction of the studio took nearly double the time and money planned. Permits were delayed numerous times, the site flooded due to heavy rains during demolition, and sump pumps had to be installed (then soundproofed) after the building was found to be atop a tributary of an underground river, Minetta Creek.

The studio was constructed specifically for Hendrix, with round windows and a machine to generate ambient lighting in myriad colors. It was designed to have a relaxing feel to encourage Hendrix's creativity, but also provide a professional recording atmosphere. According to engineer Eddie Kramer, original control room equipment featured a Datamix console, possibly 48-input, and an Ampex MM1000 16-/24-track recorder. Hendrix spent only 10 weeks recording in Electric Lady, most of which during the final phases of construction were still occurring. His last studio recording, a new solo demo for "Belly Button Window," was recorded on August 22. The last mix session with Eddie Kramer took place on August 24 on "Freedom," "Night Bird Flying," "Dolly Dagger," and "Belly Button Window." An opening party was held on August 26, 1970. Hendrix then boarded an Air India flight for London to perform at the Isle of Wight Festival; he died less than three weeks later.

=== 1970s–1990s: Height of fame ===
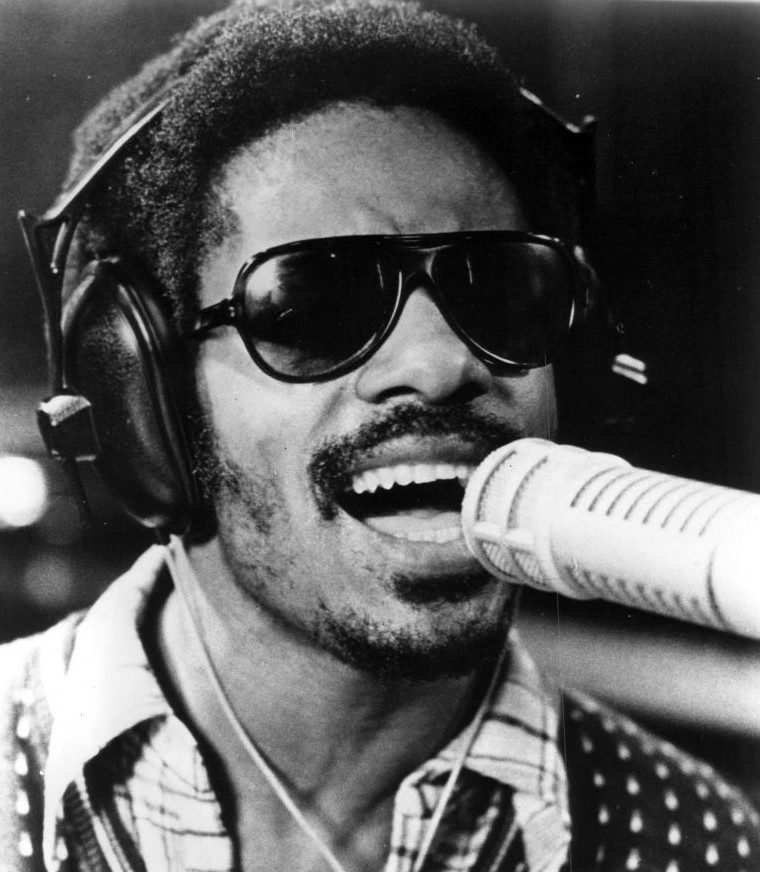
Stevie Wonder in 1973

In the following three decades, many popular artists recorded albums at Electric Lady. "From its inception, [Hendrix']s mother ship served as a rock, funk, disco and soul Olympus where gold and platinum hits were forged", Liesl Schillinger wrote in The Wall Street Journal.

Stevie Wonder used the studio extensively in the 1970s, when it became what he described as "the self-contained universe" for his work, wanting to depart from the "baby love" sound of his 1960s Motown recordings and "get as weird as possible." Among his recordings there were the 1972 albums Music of My Mind and Talking Book.

Others users included Led Zeppelin, NRBQ, Lou Reed, Hall & Oates, the Rolling Stones, and Blondie. In 1971, Gene Simmons and Paul Stanley, then with the New York rock band Wicked Lester, recorded demos at the studio. They returned a few years later to record Kiss's 1975 album Dressed to Kill.

In 1975, John Lennon and David Bowie held an improvisatory session at the studio that produced Bowie's hit single "Fame" for his Young Americans album. That same year, Patti Smith used the studio to record her debut album, Horses. In 1978, Nile Rodgers took his band Chic to Electric Lady and recorded the hit single "Le Freak." In 1981, The Waitresses recorded their holiday hit "Christmas Wrapping" there.

"The enchantment held through the '80s and '90s, as AC/DC and the Clash showed up, then Billy Idol, the Cars, Weezer and Santana", Schillinger wrote. "The house that Jimi built welcomed them all."

=== Turn of the century: Soulquarians era ===
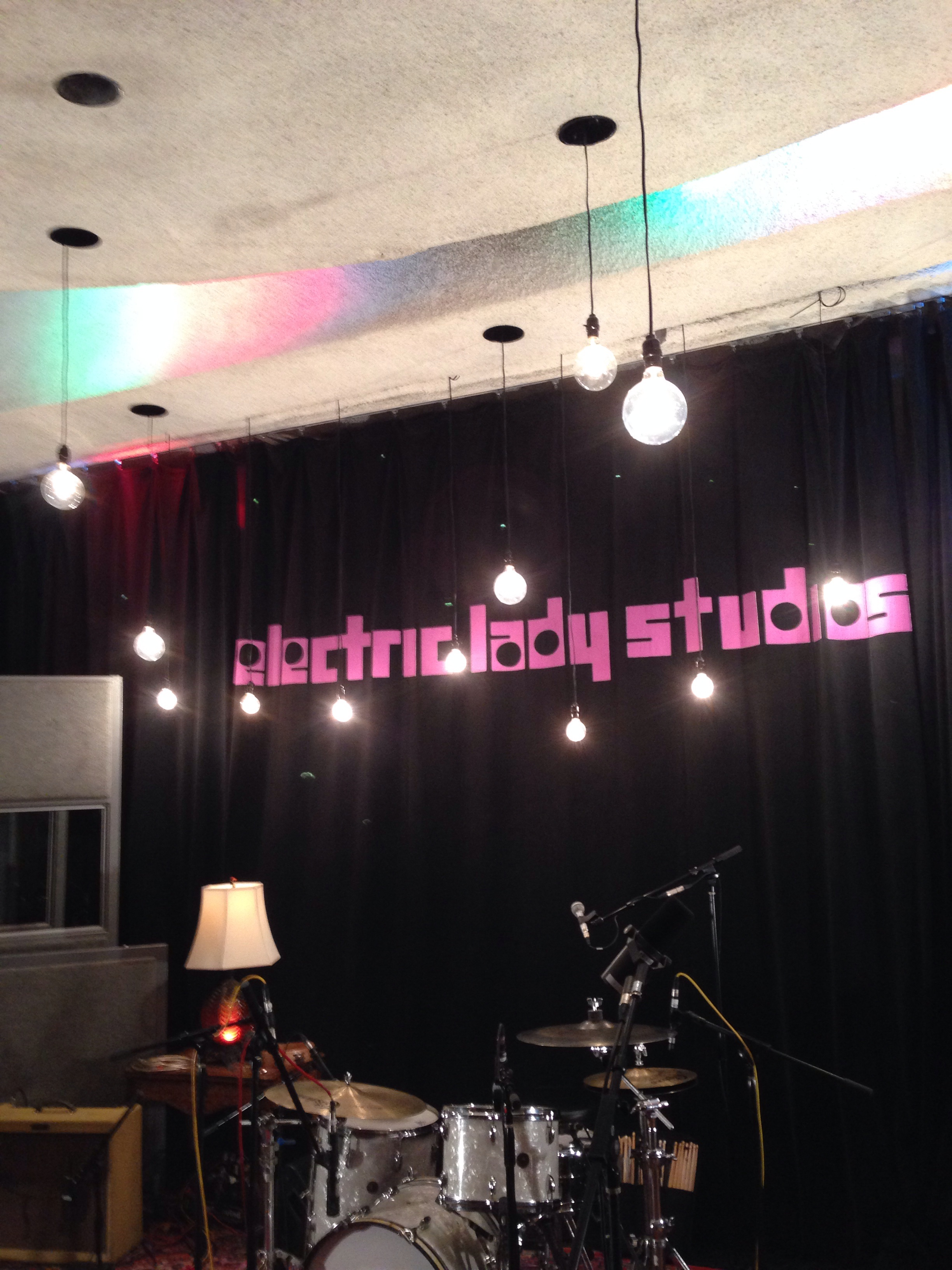
Studio A in 2014

From 1997 to the early 2000s, the Soulquarians, an experimental black music collective, held jam sessions and recorded albums at the studio, often drawing on the influence of Hendrix and Wonder's recordings. This period at the turn of the 21st century is known in the studio's history as the Soulquarians era.

In 1997, the singer D'Angelo and drummer-producer Questlove (of the Roots) prepared to record the former's second album Voodoo (2000). This led to adjacent sessions at the studio over the next five years that produced the Roots' albums Things Fall Apart (1999) and Phrenology (2002), singer Erykah Badu's second album Mama's Gun (2000), rapper Common's Like Water for Chocolate (2000) and Electric Circus (2002), and singer Bilal's debut album 1st Born Second (2001). Questlove often acted as the director behind the sessions. "I tried to do all in my power that I could to bring people together – to bring Common to Electric Lady, have him record here whenever so that he could record with some of these other artists," he said in 2002. "You'd just come into [the studio's] A Room, you don't even know who has a session, but you call me: 'Who's down there?' 'Common's in there today.' So you come down, you order some food, sit down and bullshit, watch a movie, and then it's, 'Let's play something.' And I say, 'Who wants this [track]?' And it would be, 'I want it!' 'No, I want it!'"

Eventually, the Soulquarians' period at the studio ended, in part because labels declined to release the experimental music it was producing. Bilal held improvisatory jam sessions at the studio for his second album, Love for Sale, which the label hesitated to release, and then shelved after it leaked. Common's similarly experimental Electric Circus sold disappointingly, which discouraged his and the Roots' shared label, MCA Records, from letting the artistically free environment at the studio continue. Producer Mark Ronson, who often visited Electric Lady during the Soulquarians period, said in 2015 that the studio's "glory-days era had sort of ended." According to Schillinger "after the Soulquarians had departed, the place had gone further downhill."

=== 2010s–present: Renovation and continued use ===
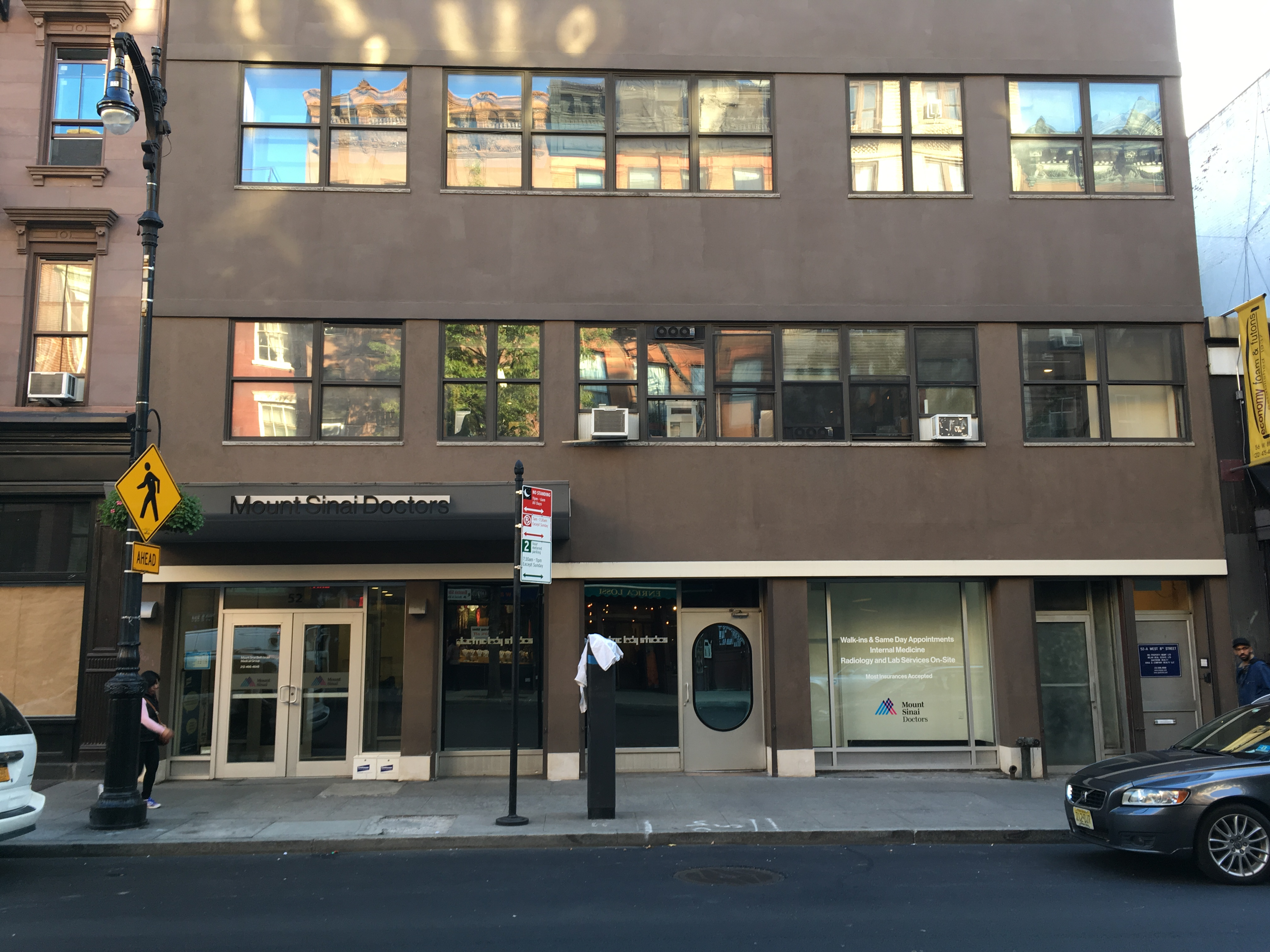
Front street view in 2016

After years of financial hardship, the studio was taken over by investor Keith Stoltz and studio manager Lee Foster in 2010. They renovated and expanded the studio, adding a new mixing studio on the second floor and turning the third into a self-contained unit including Studio C, a private lounge, and another mixing suite.

The studio has since been used by popular recording artists, such as Adele, A$AP Rocky, Jay-Z, Keith Richards (for the 2011 expanded reissue of the Stones' Some Girls LP), Daft Punk (for their 2013 album Random Access Memories), and U2 (for their 2014 album Songs of Innocence). John Mayer used the studio to record his 2012 album Born and Raised. Taylor Swift has frequently recorded at the studio, notably for the albums Lover (2019), Folklore (2020), Midnights (2022), and the re-recordings of Fearless (2021), Red (2021), Speak Now (2023), and 1989 (2023). Mixing engineer Tom Elmhirst held a residency in Studio C, where in 2014 he mixed the Beck album Morning Phase. He has commented on the pace of work by saying "this place is a beating heart." Liesl Schillinger wrote in 2015 that "one day last winter, seven sessions proceeded simultaneously, including: Interpol in Studio A; Jon Batiste (the bandleader for The Late Show with Stephen Colbert) in Studio B's live room; and Lana Del Rey, Rod Stewart and producer and singer-guitarist Dan Auerbach of the Black Keys all working on the third floor."

On December 7, 2020, the band Bleachers, who had recorded the song "Chinatown" at the studio, released a performance video filmed on the roof of the building with Bruce Springsteen. In late 2022, the Rolling Stones performed live in the studio before their future producer Andrew Watt in preparation for the production of their new studio album Hackney Diamonds.

== See also ==
- Category: Albums recorded at Electric Lady Studios
