= Monika Dannemann =

German figure skater and painter

Personal information
- Born: 24 June 1945 Düsseldorf, Germany
- Died: 5 April 1996 (aged 50) Seaford, East Sussex, England
- Occupations: Figure skater, painter
- Spouse: Uli Jon Roth

Monika Charlotte Dannemann (24 June 1945 – 5 April 1996) was a German figure skater and painter. She was the last girlfriend of guitarist Jimi Hendrix, and later (reportedly) the wife of German guitarist Uli Jon Roth of the Scorpions.

== Figure skating ==
In 1965, Dannemann participated in the German Figure Skating Championships representing the club Düsseldorfer EG.

== Involvement with Jimi Hendrix ==
Dannemann was first introduced to Jimi Hendrix on 12 January 1969, in Düsseldorf, after being invited to a Jimi Hendrix concert there. She spent that night with him and part of the next day too, when she accompanied him to his next concert in Cologne; after that, she returned to Düsseldorf. He spent the last night of the tour with model Uschi Obermaier, with whom he was filmed kissing and petting outside the Kempinski Hotel the next morning. He wrote to Dannemann on 25 March 1969, inviting her to visit him in New York City. Dannemann claims she next saw Hendrix when she travelled to London on 25 April 1969 in the hope of meeting him again, where she bumped into him at the Speakeasy Club. She says they spent some time together over the next nine days, but she only spent one night with him.

After his September 1970 European tour, Hendrix began a relationship with the Danish model Kirsten Nefer. (It was reported in the Danish press at the time that they were engaged.) After Nefer left London due to work, he again took up with Dannemann on 15 September and spent the next four nights at her flat at the Samarkand Hotel, Notting Hill Gate, where he died.

On the evening of 17 September Hendrix took at least one amphetamine pill (known as a "black bomber") at a party, where he stayed for a short while. Later, at Dannemann's flat, Hendrix took nine of her Vesparax sleeping tablets; Hendrix was officially declared to have died at St. Mary Abotts hospital at 12:45 PM. The cause of death was asphyxiation through aspiration of vomit due to a barbiturate overdose.

== Later years ==
After Hendrix's death, Dannemann became romantically involved with German rock guitarist Uli Jon Roth of rock band Scorpions, with whom she collaborated on several songs (one with Scorpions titled "We'll Burn the Sky" ), album cover designs (of Roth's post Scorpions band Electric Sun), and artwork. Roth also wrote the foreword to Dannemann's book about her experience living and working with Hendrix, entitled The Inner World of Jimi Hendrix (1995).

Dannemann died of suicide, found sitting in her Mercedes-Benz, dead of carbon monoxide poisoning at age 50 in Seaford, East Sussex. She had been found guilty of contempt of court in an ongoing court battle with another of Hendrix's girlfriends, Kathy Etchingham, two days earlier.

== Book ==
- Dannemann, Monika (1995). The Inner World of Jimi Hendrix. St. Martin's Press. ISBN 0-312-13738-9.
