= Death of Jimi Hendrix =

Death of American musician Jimi Hendrix

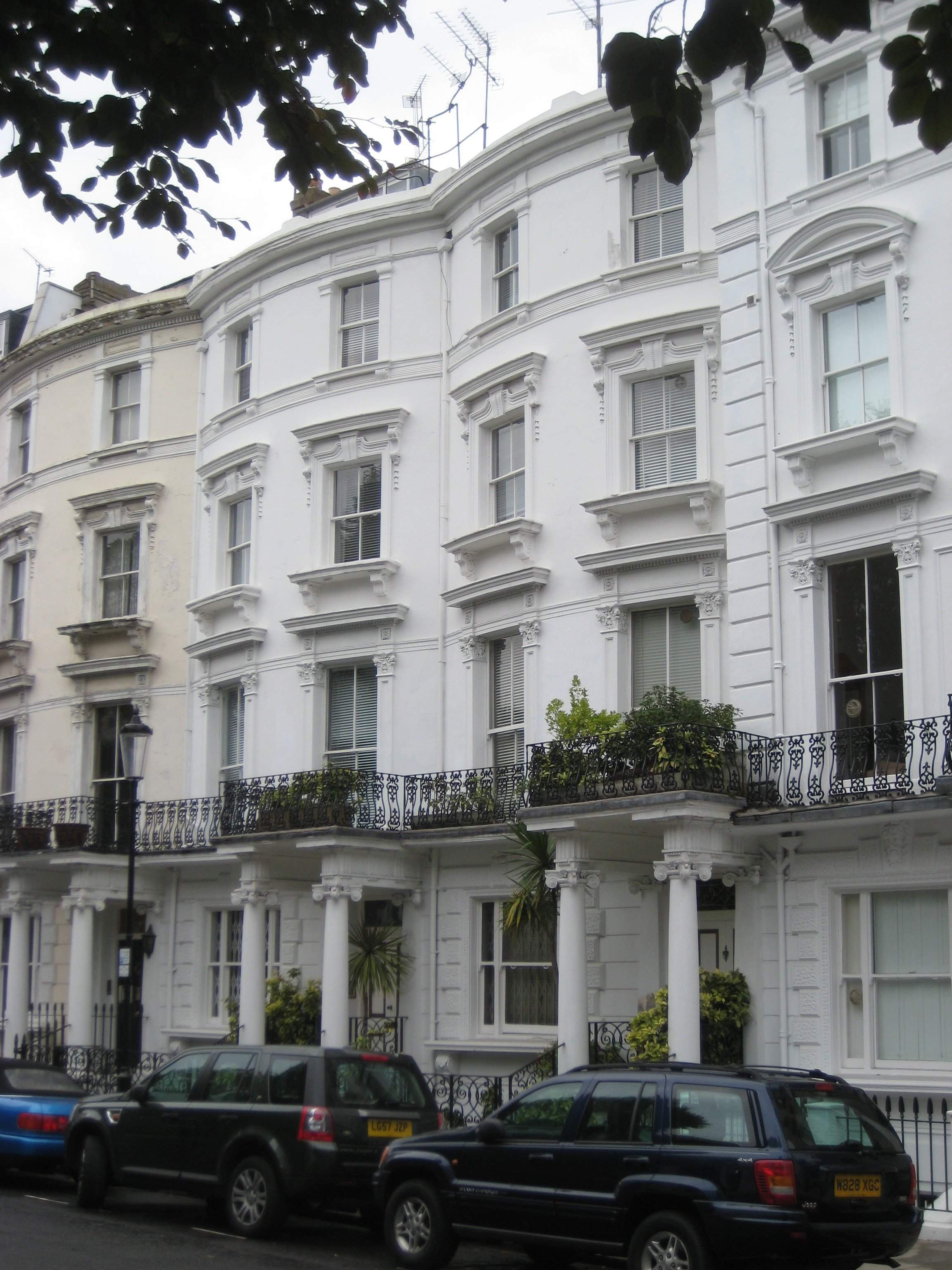
- Samarkand Hotel in September 2008
- Date: September 18, 1970; 56 years ago
- Location: Samarkand Hotel, 22 Lansdowne Crescent, Notting Hill, London, UK; 51°30′45″N 0°12′25″W
- Cause: Asphyxia due to aspiration of vomit; contributed to by barbiturate toxicity
- Burial: October 1, 1970, at Greenwood Cemetery, Renton, Washington, US
- Inquest: September 18, 1970, in London
- Coroner: Gavin Thurston
- Charges: None
- Verdict: Open

On September 18, 1970, American musician Jimi Hendrix died in London at the age of 27. Considered the most influential guitarist of the 1960s, he was described by the Rock and Roll Hall of Fame as "arguably the greatest instrumentalist in the history of rock music."

In the days before his death, Hendrix had been in poor health, in part from fatigue caused by overwork, a chronic lack of sleep, and an assumed influenza-related illness. Insecurities about his personal relationships, as well as disillusionment with the music industry, had also contributed to his frustration. Although the details of his final hours and death are disputed, Hendrix spent much of his last day alive with Monika Dannemann. In the morning hours of September 18, Dannemann found Hendrix unresponsive in her apartment at the Samarkand Hotel, 22 Lansdowne Crescent, Notting Hill. She called for an ambulance at 11:18 a.m., and Hendrix was taken to St Mary Abbots Hospital, where an attempt was made to resuscitate him. He was pronounced dead at 12:45 p.m.

The post-mortem examination concluded that Hendrix aspirated his own vomit and died of asphyxia while intoxicated with barbiturates. At the inquest, the coroner, finding no evidence of suicide, and lacking sufficient evidence of the circumstances, recorded an open verdict. Dannemann stated that Hendrix had taken nine of her prescribed Vesparax sleeping tablets, 18 times the recommended dosage.

On October 1, 1970, Hendrix was interred at Greenwood Cemetery in Renton, Washington. In 1992, his former girlfriend, Kathy Etchingham, asked British authorities to reopen the investigation into Hendrix's death. A subsequent inquiry by Scotland Yard proved inconclusive, and in 1993 they decided against proceeding with an investigation.

== Background ==
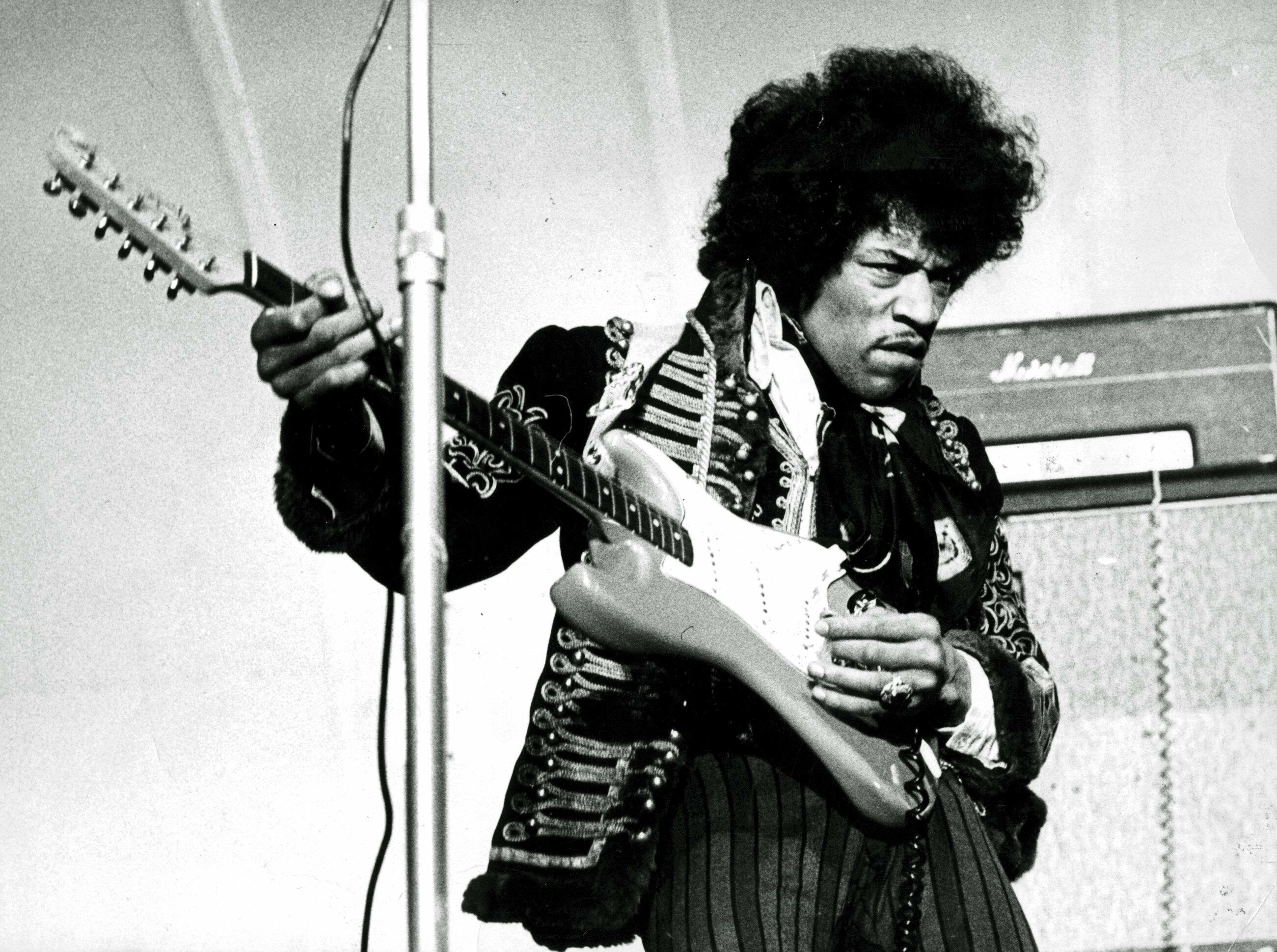
Hendrix on stage in Stockholm, Sweden, 1967

During the week before his death, Jimi Hendrix was dealing with two pending lawsuits: one a paternity case, and the other a recording contract dispute that was due to be heard in the High Court of Justice the following week. (Note: The contract dispute stemmed from a three-year deal Hendrix had signed with producer Ed Chalpin in October 1965, less than one year before Hendrix went to England, signed with Track Records, and formed the Experience. The paternity suit was brought against Hendrix by Diane Carpenter after the birth of her child, Tamika James Lawrence Carpenter.) He was also troubled with wanting to leave his manager, Michael Jeffery. Hendrix was fatigued and suffering from poor health, owing in part to severe exhaustion caused by overworking, a chronic lack of sleep, and a persistent illness assumed to be influenza-related. Lacking trusting personal relationships, his insecurities about the future and disillusionment with the music industry contributed to his frustration.

On September 11, 1970, Hendrix gave his final interview in his suite at the Cumberland Hotel in London, where he talked with Keith Altham, a journalist for Record Mirror. During the interview, Hendrix confirmed reports that Billy Cox, the bass player in his band, the Jimi Hendrix Experience, was leaving. Cox, who had been suffering from severe exhaustion and was exhibiting symptoms of paranoia, mutually agreed with Hendrix that they should suspend their plans to collaborate musically. When Altham asked Hendrix: "Do you feel any kind of compulsion to prove yourself as King Guitar", Hendrix replied: "No, I don't even let that bother me. Because they say a lot of things about people that, if they let it bother them, they wouldn't even be around today ... King Guitar now? Wow, that's a bit heavy." Altham also suggested that Hendrix invented psychedelic music, to which he laughed and replied: "A mad scientist approach ... I don't consider [my music] the invention of psychedelic, it's just asking a lot of questions."

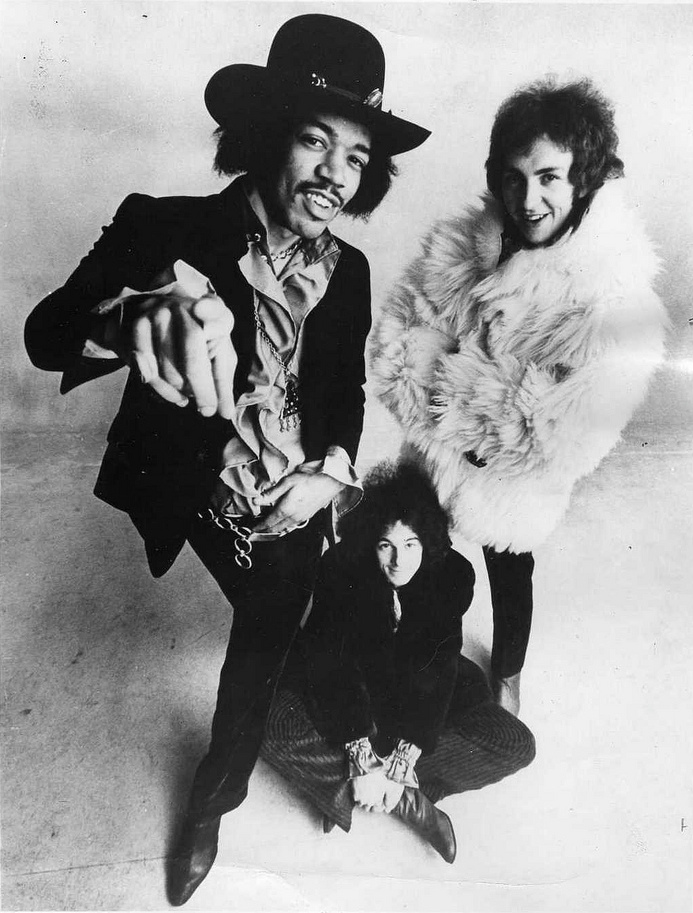
The Experience in 1968

The following day, Hendrix received a phone call from one of his girlfriends, Devon Wilson, who had become jealous after hearing rumors that he was dating another woman, Kirsten Nefer. Nefer recalled: "I heard Jimi talk to Devon ... she was mad ... she went into fits ... Jimi said 'Devon, get off my back'". Hendrix was scheduled to perform in Rotterdam on September 13, but the show, along with three others, was cancelled because of Cox's incapacitation. During the evening of September 13, Nefer visited Hendrix at the Cumberland. After informing him that she would have to go back to work that evening, he convinced her to phone her boss, actor George Lazenby, and ask for the night off. Lazenby became angry and shouted over the phone to Nefer: "You're nothing but a fucking groupie", which Hendrix overheard. The exchange upset him, and he told Nefer: "Don't you ever go out to that guy again". Nefer explained to him that she had spent six months working on a film with Lazenby and that she did not want to quit her job; Hendrix eventually agreed. Nefer spent the night with him and left in the morning.

Hendrix spent most of the early afternoon and evening of September 14 discussing his career plans with the record producer Alan Douglas. In the early morning hours of September 15, he went to London's Heathrow Airport with Douglas, who was returning to New York. Hendrix's confidante Sharon Lawrence was in London, and spoke with him that day. Lawrence commented: "Jimi tracked me down, detailing his pressures and discussing the 'so-called friends'. He was jittery and angry." According to Lawrence, Hendrix told her: "I can't sleep. I can't focus to write any songs." Later that afternoon, his girlfriend Monika Dannemann arrived at the Cumberland. She and Hendrix then drove to her apartment in the Samarkand Hotel, 22 Lansdowne Crescent, Notting Hill. (Note: Dannemann later said that she and Hendrix had become engaged to be married in early 1969, and completed their wedding plans during his final days. She said they kept their plans a secret so as to avoid offending her father, who did not approve of interracial marriage. Dannemann told author Tony Brown that she had letters from Hendrix proving their one-year engagement, but refused to allow him to view them as "far too personal". Dannemann friend, Judy Wong said that Hendrix told her about the engagement while attending her birthday party, during the afternoon of September 16, 1970.)

During the afternoon of September 15, Hendrix was asked by his friend Eric Burdon, formerly of the Animals, if he wanted to participate in a jam session at Ronnie Scott's Jazz Club with Burdon's newly formed band, War. Hendrix accepted, but when he arrived at the club that evening, he was not allowed to play owing to his apparently drug-related disorientation. Burdon commented: "Jimi came down and was well out of it. He ... was wobbling too much to play, so I told him to come back the following night." Hendrix returned the next night and presented a healthier appearance. The crowd was enthusiastic and impressed by his performance despite his uncharacteristically subdued guitar playing when he sat in with War on "Tobacco Road" and "Mother Earth". This was the last time Hendrix played guitar in public. (Note: On September 16, Hendrix refused to meet with his lawyer, Henry Steingarten, who wanted to discuss the pending court cases. Chas Chandler said he met with Hendrix on September 16, but this is disputed. Chandler is unsure which day of the week this occurred, and later told the press that it took place in March of that year.)

== Final hours ==
=== Late morning and early afternoon ===
One of the last photographs of Hendrix, at the Samarkand Hotel, September 17, 1970; he died less than 24 hours later.

Although the details of Hendrix's last day and death are unclear and widely disputed, he had spent much of September 17 in London with Monika Dannemann. He awoke late that morning at Dannemann's apartment in the Samarkand Hotel. By around 2:00 p.m., he was sitting in a garden area outside the apartment enjoying some tea while she took photographs of him holding his favorite Fender Stratocaster guitar that he called "Black Beauty". In the opinion of author Tony Brown, "Jimi doesn't look particularly healthy in these photographs: his face seems a little puffy and on only a few of the pictures does he attempt to smile." (Note: After Hendrix's death, Dannemann took possession of the guitar. It is now owned by former Scorpions guitarist Uli Jon Roth.)

According to Dannemann, by 3:00 p.m. they had left the apartment where they first went to a local bank to withdraw some money from Hendrix's bank account. They continued on to Kensington Market, where Hendrix signed an autograph for a young boy, purchased a leather jacket, and ordered some shoes. He also briefly spoke with his ex-girlfriend Kathy Etchingham whom they ran into at a store where Hendrix invited her to visit him at his hotel that evening at 8:00 p.m.; she declined the invitation because of prior engagements, and later admitted that she had "regretted it ever since". Hendrix and Dannemann then went to a Chelsea antiques market, where Hendrix purchased more clothing. After another stop to buy writing paper, which he used to compose his final lyrics, Dannemann and Hendrix drove to his suite at the Cumberland Hotel, meeting Devon Wilson as she walked down King's Road. Hendrix asked Dannemann to stop the car so that he could get out and talk with Wilson, who invited Hendrix to a party that evening. Dannemann became jealous, giving Wilson a cold stare during the brief meeting. Later, Phillip Harvey invited Dannemann and Hendrix to tea; they accepted. Prior to their arrival at Harvey's, they briefly stopped by the Cumberland. (Note: Cumberland staff reported seeing Hendrix that afternoon. He ordered room service and arranged for his shoes to be cleaned.)

While at the hotel, Hendrix made several telephone calls. Dannemann said he phoned his lawyer Henry Steingarten, asking him to find a way out of his contract with his manager Mike Jeffery, and producer Eddie Kramer, for whom Hendrix left a voice message. (Note: According to Jeffery's assistant Trixie Sullivan, Hendrix called and left a message for Jeffery that afternoon.) Mitch Mitchell said that he called Hendrix at the Cumberland on September 17, after having been asked to do so by tour manager Gerry Stickells, who had spoken to Hendrix just minutes earlier. (Note: According to Mitchell, this occurred sometime around 6:45 p.m.) Mitchell said that during the phone conversation Hendrix agreed to join him around midnight at the Speakeasy Club for a previously arranged jam session, which included Sly Stone. (Note: Dannemann claimed that Mitchell telephoned Hendrix at the Samarkand around 8:30 p.m. on the evening of September 17; however, Mitchell denied knowing the telephone number of the Samarkand or that Hendrix was with Dannemann in London and said that he called Hendrix at the Cumberland. In light of Mitchell and Harvey's statements and Dannemann's account of Hendrix making telephone calls from the Cumberland earlier that day, it is more likely that Hendrix spoke with Mitchell and Stickells from his suite there at around 4:30 p.m.)

=== Late afternoon and evening ===
After stopping at the Cumberland, Hendrix and Dannemann accompanied Harvey to his apartment, arriving around 5:30 p.m. Hendrix and Dannemann smoked hashish and drank tea and wine with Harvey and two of his female companions while discussing their individual careers. Sometime around 10:00 p.m., Dannemann, apparently feeling left out of the conversation and jealous of the attention Hendrix was giving Harvey's female friends, became visibly upset and stormed out of the flat. Hendrix followed her, and an argument ensued between them during which Dannemann reportedly shouted: "you fucking pig". Harvey, concerned that their yelling would draw unwanted attention from the police, asked them to quiet down.

Harvey, who had remained silent about the incident out of respect for his father Lord Harvey, gave an affidavit after his father's death in 1994. In his statement, he claims to have been mildly concerned for Hendrix's safety, worried that Dannemann might "resort to serious physical violence". According to Harvey, Dannemann "verbally assaulted [Hendrix] in the most offensive possible way". Approximately 30 minutes later, Hendrix re-entered the flat and apologized for the outburst before leaving with Dannemann at 10:40 p.m. Dannemann said she then prepared a meal for them at her apartment around 11:00 p.m. and shared a bottle of wine with Hendrix. Sometime after returning to the apartment, Hendrix took a bath, then wrote a poem titled "The Story of Life". He also called former producer/co-manager Chas Chandler and left a message on the answering machine, "I need help bad, man." (Note: According to an article published shortly after Hendrix's death in Jet magazine, Chandler returned Hendrix's call: "The next morning at 10, Chandler heard these words gasped on his answering machine: 'I need help bad, man.' He called immediately, but Hendrix, already near death, groaned, it was reported, 'Call me a bit later man.'")

=== Early morning ===
At approximately 1:45 a.m. on Friday, September 18, Dannemann drove Hendrix to the party Wilson had invited him to earlier that day, which was hosted by Hendrix's acquaintance and business associate, Pete Kameron. At the party, Hendrix complained to Kameron about business problems, ate some food, and took at least one amphetamine tablet. (Note: The amphetamine tablet Hendrix ingested was a Durophet 20 mg, also known as a "Black Bomber".) Approximately 30 minutes later, Dannemann rang the flat's intercom asking for Hendrix. Another guest, Stella Douglas, asked her to return later. According to guest Angie Burdon, the estranged wife of Eric Burdon of the Animals, when Dannemann came back around 15 minutes later, Douglas used an assertive approach with her to the point of being impolite. Undeterred, Dannemann demanded to speak with Hendrix. Burdon recalled: "[Hendrix] got angry because [Dannemann] wouldn't leave him alone." (Note: Burdon said Hendrix "seemed jumpy" at the party.) According to Burdon, other guests at the party shouted out the windows at Dannemann, asking her to leave. Hendrix eventually yielded and spoke with Dannemann before unexpectedly leaving the party around 3:00 a.m.

Dannemann, the only eyewitness to Hendrix's final hours, said that sometime after 3:00 a.m., she prepared two tuna fish sandwiches for them after arriving back at her basement apartment. Around 4:00 a.m., Hendrix, struggling with insomnia after having consumed amphetamines hours earlier, asked her for sleeping tablets. She later said she refused his request hoping he would fall asleep naturally. Dannemann said she surreptitiously took a sleeping tablet sometime around 6:00 a.m., with Hendrix still awake. She awoke sometime between 10:00–10:20 a.m. to find him sleeping normally in bed next to her. She said she then left to purchase cigarettes, and when she returned around 11:00 a.m., found him in bed breathing, although unconscious and unresponsive. She telephoned for an ambulance at 11:18 a.m. and one arrived at 11:27 a.m.

When ambulance crew members Reg Jones and John Saua arrived at the Samarkand, the door to the flat was wide open, the gas fire was on, the curtains were drawn, and the apartment was dark. The crew called out several times, but after receiving no response, they entered and found Hendrix alone in bed. Dannemann was nowhere to be found. According to Jones: "Well, we had to get the police, we only had [Hendrix] and an empty flat, so John ran up and radioed, and got the aspirator ... It was horrific. He was covered in vomit. There was tons of it all over the pillow—black and brown it was. His airway was completely blocked all the way down ... We felt his pulse ... [shone] a light in his eyes. But there was no response at all." At 11:30 a.m., police officers Ian Smith and Tom Keene responded to a call for police assistance from the ambulance control centre. Jones commented: "Once the police arrived, which seemed like no time at all, we got [Hendrix] off to hospital as quick as we could."

The ambulance crew left the hotel at approximately 11:35 a.m. to take Hendrix to St Mary Abbots Hospital and they arrived at 11:45 a.m. Medical registrar Martin Seifert stated: "Jimi was rushed into the [resuscitation] room. He was put on a monitor, but it [ECG trace] was flat. I pounded his heart [CPR] a couple of times, but there was no point, he was dead". According to Seifert, the attempt to resuscitate Hendrix lasted "just a few minutes".

The surgical registrar, John Bannister, commented: "He was cold and he was blue. He had all the parameters of someone who had been dead for some time. We worked on him for about half an hour without any response at all." Bannister pronounced Hendrix dead at 12:45 p.m., on Friday, September 18, 1970; he was 27 years old. He later stated: "On admission he was obviously dead. He had no pulse, no heartbeat, and the attempt to resuscitate him was merely a formality." (Note: Hendrix tour manager Gerry Stickells identified the body sometime around 12:00 p.m. Until Sticklles' identification, neither the police, doctors, nor ambulance crew knew that the patient was Hendrix.)

Dr John Bannister has stated that the Jimi Hendrix murder theory is plausible due to the volume of wine both on Hendrix's corpse and in its stomach and lungs. "The amount of wine that was over him was just extraordinary. Not only was it saturated right through his hair and shirt but his lungs and stomach were absolutely full of wine. I have never seen so much wine. We had a sucker that you put down into his trachea, the entrance to his lungs and to the whole of the back of his throat. We kept sucking him out and it kept surging and surging."

== Media response ==
The story of life is quicker than the wink of an eye. The story of love is hello and goodbye. Until we meet again.

— The last stanza from Hendrix's final poem, "The Story of Life"

During the morning of September 18, Eric Burdon arrived at the Samarkand sometime before the ambulance crew and found that Hendrix was already dead. Burdon immediately became concerned that police would find drugs at the apartment, and as he was collecting incriminating evidence, he found the poem that Hendrix had written hours earlier, "The Story of Life". Burdon, who said he had previously discussed suicide and death with Hendrix, assumed the poem was a suicide note. Under this assumption, he made comments to the press regarding his belief that Hendrix had committed suicide that he has since recanted: "I made false statements ... I simply didn't understand what the situation was. I misread the note ... I thought it was a goodbye". (Note: Dannemann stated that tour managers Gerry Stickells and Eric Barrett had been present before the ambulance was called, and had removed some of Hendrix's possessions, including some of his most recent messages.) Dannemann said Hendrix told her: "I want you to keep this [poem] forever [and] I don't want you to forget anything that is written. It's a story about you and me". (Note: In 1996, after being found guilty of libel against Etchingham and contempt of a UK court, Dannemann committed suicide.)

Soon after Bannister pronounced Hendrix dead, a hospital spokesperson told the press: "We don't know where, how, or why he died, but he died of an overdose." By that evening, many newspapers in London and New York had printed sensationalized headlines that exploited the death-from-overdose account. Hendrix's public relations manager, Les Perrin, granted an interview on Dutch radio soon after the hospital announcement. He commented: "Well, all I know is that Mr. Hendrix's body was taken to St. Mary Abbots Hospital in Kensington, London, at 11:45 this morning, and he was certified to be dead on arrival." At 2:00 p.m., BBC Radio 1 reported: "Jimi Hendrix, regarded by millions as one of the most talented and original performers in modern rock music, is dead." That evening, The New York Times described him as "a genius black musician, a guitarist, singer and composer of brilliantly dramatic power. He spoke in gestures as big as he could imagine and create."

On September 19, Dannemann spoke with a journalist for the German tabloid Bild. During the interview, published on September 24, Dannemann stated: "I loved him, and Jimi loved me ... We were already engaged ... I would then have designed the sleeves for his records ... He could not sleep. So I gave him the tablets." (Note: Although Dannemann later claimed the interview never took place, she acknowledged an encounter with a journalist from Bild. Along with the interview, Bild printed a picture of Dannemann and Hendrix taken during their first meeting in January 1969. According to author Tony Brown, this image could have only been supplied to the tabloid by Dannemann.) On September 20, a reporter from The Daily Telegraph interviewed Dannemann's brother, Klaus-Peter Dannemann, who stated: "[Monika] telephoned me on [September 19] and told me that [Hendrix] took nine sleeping tablets. She said that Jimi had told her that he wanted to sleep for a day and a half before he went to America. She told me that he did not intend to kill himself."

== Post-mortem ==
To determine the cause of death, the coroner, Gavin Thurston, ordered a post-mortem examination on Hendrix's body, which was performed on September 21, by Professor Robert Donald Teare, a forensic pathologist. Teare reported that Hendrix was "well nourished and muscular", and he identified a quarter-inch scar on Hendrix's left wrist. (Note: Etchingham said the scar was there when Hendrix arrived in England in 1966.) He said that there were "no stigmata of [intravenous] drug addiction. Once these marks are there [in the skin], they never go away. In this case, there were no marks at all." Although Teare observed that the right side of Hendrix's heart was widely dilated, he found no evidence of valvular heart disease. He discovered a partially collapsed left lung and 400 ml of fluid in Hendrix's chest. Both lungs were congested, and vomit was found in the smaller bronchi. According to Teare, Hendrix's stomach "contained a medium-sized partially digested meal in which rice could be distinguished." Teare concluded that Hendrix's kidneys were healthy, and his liver was congested. His "bladder was half full of clear urine." He stated that Hendrix's blood alcohol content was 100 mg per 100 ml, "enough to fail a breathalyzer test ... the equivalent of about four pints of beer." Teare reported that analysis of Hendrix's blood "revealed a mixture of barbiturates consistent with those from Vesparax", and he estimated that drug concentrations translated to ingestion of 1.8 grams of barbiturate, 20 mg of amphetamine, and 20 mg of cannabis. (Note: In the mid-1990s, Rufus Crompton, a former student of Teare's and his successor at the Department of Forensic Medicine in St. George's Hospital Medical School, re-examined Teare's post-mortem report. He concluded that the barbiturate level in Hendrix's blood, 0.7 mg/100 ml, was above the toxic level of 0.5 mg/100 ml. He stated that this level of barbiturate intoxication would have significantly inhibited Hendrix's cough reflex, making it difficult for him to breathe after he began to vomit.) Teare gave the cause of death as: "Inhalation of vomit due to barbiturate intoxication." He did not attempt to determine Hendrix's time of death. (Note: According to Crompton, food usually remains in the stomach for less than four hours. Based on the post-mortem identification of whole rice grains in Hendrix's stomach and reports that Hendrix ate rice sometime between 11 p.m. and 12 a.m., Crompton concluded that Hendrix died no later than 4 a.m.)

Thurston began an inquest on September 23, and on September 28 he concluded that Hendrix had aspirated his own vomit and died of asphyxia while intoxicated with barbiturates. Citing "insufficient evidence of [the] circumstances", he recorded an open verdict. He commented: "The cause of death was clearly inhalation of vomit due to barbiturate intoxication, but there is no evidence as to intention to commit suicide ... If the question of intention cannot be answered, then it is proper to find the cause of death and leave it an open verdict." Dannemann later stated that Hendrix had taken nine of her prescribed Vesparax sleeping tablets. Intended to be taken in half-tablet doses, nine tablets of the powerful sedative amounted to 18 times the recommended amount. (Note: The recommended dose of half a tablet of Vesparax would typically induce eight hours of sleep if ingested by a 160 lb person.)

After Hendrix's body had been embalmed by Desmond Henley, it was flown to Seattle, Washington, on September 29. After a service at Dunlap Baptist Church on October 1, he was interred at Greenwood Cemetery in Renton, Washington, the location of his mother's gravesite. Hendrix's family and friends traveled in 24 limousines. More than two hundred people attended the funeral, including several notable musicians such as the original Experience members Mitch Mitchell and Noel Redding, as well as Miles Davis, John Hammond and Johnny Winter.

== Inconsistencies and the Scotland Yard inquiry ==
Tony Brown, author of Jimi Hendrix: The Final Days (1997), had been in regular contact with Dannemann from 1980 until her death in 1996. He visited her on multiple occasions and spoke with her numerous times over the phone. Soon after contacting her, Brown came to the conclusion that her account of the events of Hendrix's final days "would change from one call to the next." In the days following Hendrix's death, she gave two significantly different accounts of the morning of September 18.

At approximately 4:00 p.m. on September 18, Dannemann told Police Sergeant John Shaw: "We went to sleep about 7:00 a.m. When I woke up at eleven his face was covered in vomit, and he was breathing noisily. I sent for an ambulance, and he was taken to hospital. I also noticed that ten of my sleeping tablets were missing." (Note: Dannemann said that her Vesparax tablets came in packets of ten, and that she found an empty packet that morning and assumed Hendrix had taken them all. She later found a tablet that had fallen under the bed, and surmised he had taken nine.) In a statement given to P. Weyell of the coroner's office on September 24, she said:

I made a sandwich and we talked until about 7:00 a.m. He then said that he wanted to go to sleep. He took some tablets, and we went to bed. I woke up about 11:00 a.m., and saw that Jimi's face was covered in vomit. I tried to wake him but could not. I called an ambulance and he was taken to the hospital in Kensington ... Prior to going with him to the hospital, I checked my supply of Vesparax sleeping tablets and found that nine of them were missing. (Note: Dannemann told Weyell that she and Hendrix stayed in the previous night and that she prepared a meal of tuna fish for them at her apartment. Etchingham later refuted Dannemann's account, insisting that Hendrix strongly disliked tuna and would never have asked for it. Dannemann commented: "He did take one tiny bite, then put down the sandwich and didn't touch it anymore.")

In Dannemann's initial statements, she said she awoke at 11 a.m. on September 18. During the inquest she stated that she awoke at 10:20 a.m., and left to purchase cigarettes, something she had previously failed to mention. In 1971, she wrote a manuscript in which she said she awoke at 10 a.m. In 1975, during an interview with author Caesar Glebbeek, Dannemann stated that she awoke at 9 a.m. According to Burdon, Dannemann phoned him as "the first light of dawn was coming through the window." (Note: During an interview published by Earth magazine in December 1970, Burdon stated: "When Monika phoned, I said he would be okay, but later told her to get an ambulance. I thought he would be alright by then, but that was that." In 1991, while conducting an investigation of her own, Etchingham recorded a phone conversation during which Burdon stated: "I was fucking out of my mind. I'd just finished a gig at Ronnie Scott's. I was in bed ... and I got this telephone call from [Dannemann] ... I said he's just stoned, I said just wake him up. I said just pour some coffee down his face and slap him around and wake him up. And then I went back to bed. It was early morning when I got the call, in fact I thought it was earlier than early morning ... in the early hours. Then I got this alarm bell ringing in my head, and I woke up and sat up and went, 'Wait a minute, something's wrong here'. I called her back, and I had to yell and scream in order for her to get an ambulance.") (Note: Sunrise in London on 18 September 1970 was at 6:46 am) Stickells said he received a phone call regarding a problem with Hendrix "between 8 a.m. and 9 a.m." Mitchell said he waited for Hendrix at the Speakeasy Club until they closed at 4 a.m., and a couple of hours after his hour- and-a-half drive home, he received a phone call from Stickells, who told him Hendrix had died. In her statements to the police and coroner's office, Dannemann never mentioned telephoning Burdon. (Note: Dannemann also telephoned friends Judy Wong and Alvinia Bridges prior to telephoning for an ambulance at 11:18 a.m. She did not mention these phone calls during any of her statements to the police or coroner's office.)

Although Dannemann claimed that Hendrix was alive when placed in the ambulance at approximately 11:30 a.m. and that she rode with him on the way to the hospital, the ambulance crew later denied she was there. Statements from the paramedics who responded to the call support that they found Hendrix alone in the flat when they arrived at 11:27 a.m., fully clothed and apparently already dead. Jones later commented: "[When] we arrived at the flat, the door was flung wide open, nobody about, just the body on the bed." Saua stated: "There was just me and the casualty and Reg the driver. Nobody else." Burdon stated: "[Dannemann] didn't leave in the ambulance; she was with me". According to Jones, Hendrix's bowels and bladder had released some of their contents prior to the ambulance crew's arrival at the Samarkand. Saua stated that the vomit was dry when they arrived, making use of their aspirator ineffective. Saua commented: "When we moved [Hendrix], the gases were gurgling, you get that when someone has died". According to police officer Smith: "The ambulance men were there, but Jimi was dead ... There was really nothing they could do for him." (Note: The second police officer who arrived at the scene, Tom Keene, has never been located.) Smith also disputes Dannemann's claim that she was there with Hendrix at the flat and in the ambulance:

No, I remember quite clearly the doors shutting on the crew and Jimi ... there was no one about. If she had been in the flat, they would never have called us to come ... But because no one was there, he was dead, and circumstances were a little odd, suspicious, they radioed ... us in. It wasn't until later in the day that I found out that it was Jimi Hendrix.

In 1992, after having conducted an extensive review of the events of September 18, 1970, the London Ambulance Service issued an official statement: "There was no one else, except the deceased, at the flat when they arrived; nor did anyone else accompany them in the ambulance to St. Mary Abbotts Hospital." (Note: According to Bannister, Hendrix asphyxiated mainly on red wine, which filled his airways. Bannister's statement was made in January 1992 to Harry Shapiro, co-author of Electric Gypsy, a book which included accusations of malpractice by Dannemann regarding Bannister because he did not perform a tracheotomy on Hendrix. No one else at the time, the other doctors, ambulance crew, or the police mentioned wine. Only Dannemann mentioned wine, in the first edition of Electric Gypsy (1990), which Bannister read previous to making the statement. The autopsy found relatively low levels of alcohol in his system and never mentioned wine, only vomited matter. On April 28, 1992, in connection with unrelated matters, Bannister was reprimanded for three counts of medical malpractice, and struck off the medical register for fraud.)

In 1992, having arranged for a private investigation of Hendrix's death, Etchingham supplied the results of the effort to UK authorities and requested they reopen the coroner's inquest. After a several-month inquiry by Scotland Yard, during which every interested party to the events was interviewed, officials were confident the request would be granted. The investigation eventually proved inconclusive in 1993, when Attorney General Sir Nicholas Lyell decided that proceeding with the investigation would not serve the public, owing in part to the excessive time that had passed since Hendrix's death. (Note: In 2009, a former roadie for the Animals, James "Tappy" Wright, published a book which claimed that Hendrix's manager, Mike Jeffery, admitted to him that he had Hendrix killed because Hendrix wanted to end his management contract with Jeffery. In 2011, Bob Levine, Wright's long-term business associate and Jeffery's assistant manager in New York, said Wright made up these stories to sell his book.)

== General and cited sources ==
- Black, Johnny (1999). Jimi Hendrix: The Ultimate Experience. Thunder's Mouth Press. ISBN 978-1-56025-240-5.
- Brown, Tony (1997). Jimi Hendrix: The Final Days. Omnibus Press. ISBN 978-0-7119-5238-6.
- Cross, Charles R. (2005). Room Full of Mirrors: A Biography of Jimi Hendrix. Hyperion. ISBN 978-0-7868-8841-2.
- George-Warren, Holly, ed. (2001). The Rolling Stone Encyclopedia of Rock and Roll (2005 revised and updated ed.). Fireside. ISBN 978-0-7432-9201-6.
- Heatley, Michael (2009). Jimi Hendrix Gear: The Guitars, Amps & Effects that Revolutionized Rock 'n' Roll. Voyageur Press. ISBN 978-0-7603-3639-7.
- Hendrix, Janie L.; McDermott, John (2007). Jimi Hendrix: An Illustrated Experience. Atria. ISBN 978-0-7432-9769-1.
- Higgins, Chester (October 8, 1970). "How Rock Star Jimi Hendrix Lived and Died ...". Jet. Vol. 39, no. 1. Chicago, Illinois. ISSN 0021-5996.
- Lawrence, Sharon (2005). Jimi Hendrix: The Intimate Story of a Betrayed Musical Legend. Harper. ISBN 978-0-06-056301-1.
- McDermott, John (2009). Ultimate Hendrix: An Illustrated Encyclopedia of Live Concerts and Sessions. BackBeat Books. ISBN 978-0-87930-938-1.
- McDermott, John (1992). Lewisohn, Mark (ed.). Hendrix: Setting the Record Straight. Grand Central. ISBN 978-0-446-39431-4.
- Mitchell, Mitch; Platt, John (1990). Jimi Hendrix: Inside the Experience. St. Martin's Press. ISBN 978-0-312-10098-8.
- Moskowitz, David (2010). The Words and Music of Jimi Hendrix. Praeger. ISBN 978-0-313-37592-7.
- Redding, Noel; Appleby, Carol (1996). Are You Experienced?. Da Capo Press. ISBN 978-0-306-80681-0.
- Roby, Steven, ed. (2012). Hendrix on Hendrix: Interviews and Encounters with Jimi Hendrix. Chicago Review Press. ISBN 978-1-61374-322-5.
- Roby, Steven; Schreiber, Brad (2010). Becoming Jimi Hendrix: From Southern Crossroads to Psychedelic London, the Untold Story of a Musical Genius. Da Capo. ISBN 978-0-306-81910-0.
- Shadwick, Keith (2003). Jimi Hendrix: Musician. Backbeat Books. ISBN 978-0-87930-764-6.
- Shapiro, Harry; Glebbeek, Caesar (1995) [1990]. Jimi Hendrix: Electric Gypsy (New and Improved ed.). St. Martin's Press. ISBN 978-0-312-13062-6.
- Unterberger, Richie (2009). The Rough Guide to Jimi Hendrix. Rough Guides. ISBN 978-1-84836-002-0.
- "Jimi Hendrix murder theory 'plausible':Aussie doctor". The Sydney Morning Herald. The Sydney Morning Herald.
