= Lansdowne Crescent, London =

Street in Notting Hill, London

Coordinates: 51.5113°N 0.2074°W

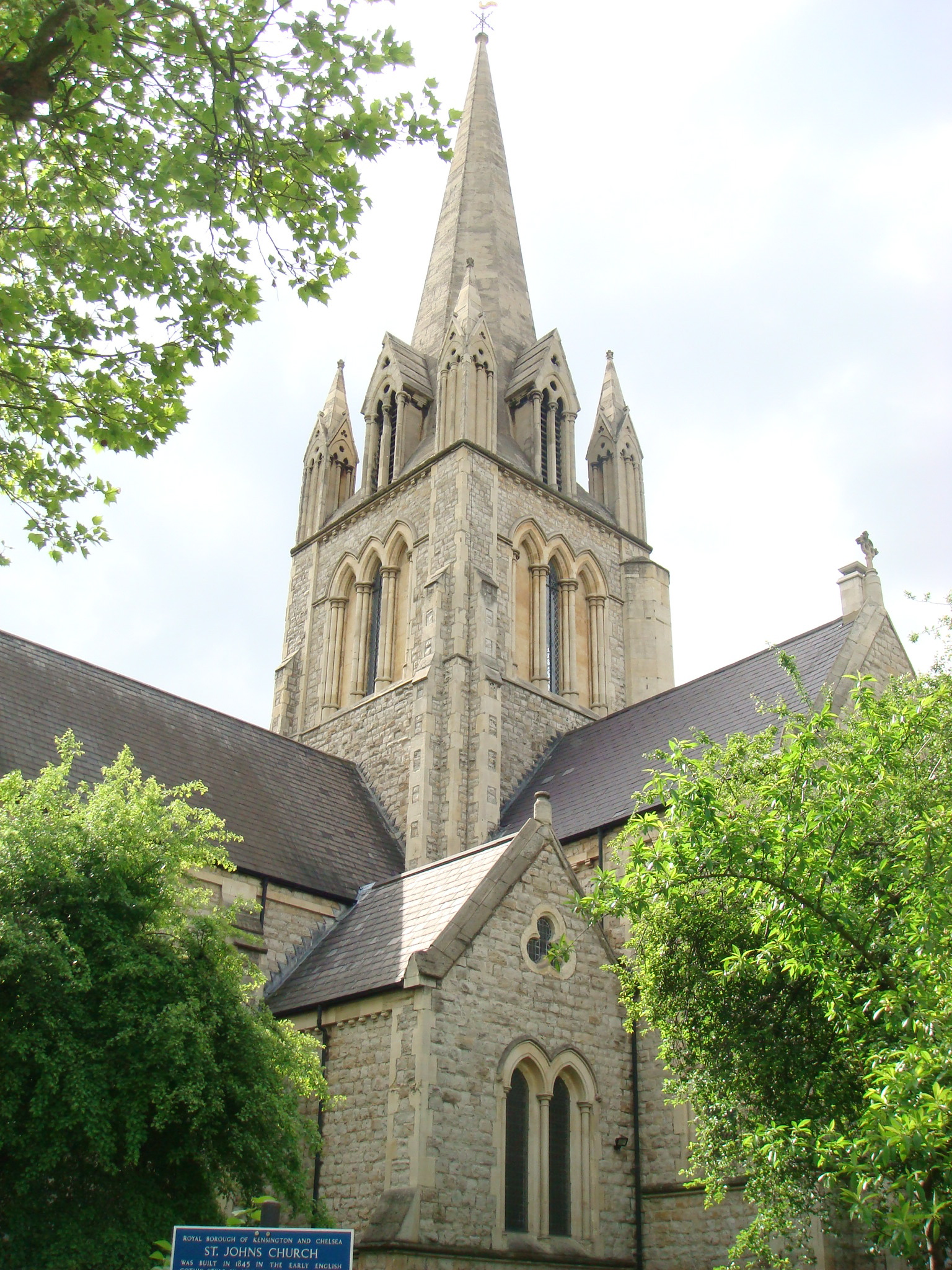
St John's Notting Hill in Landsdowne Crescent.

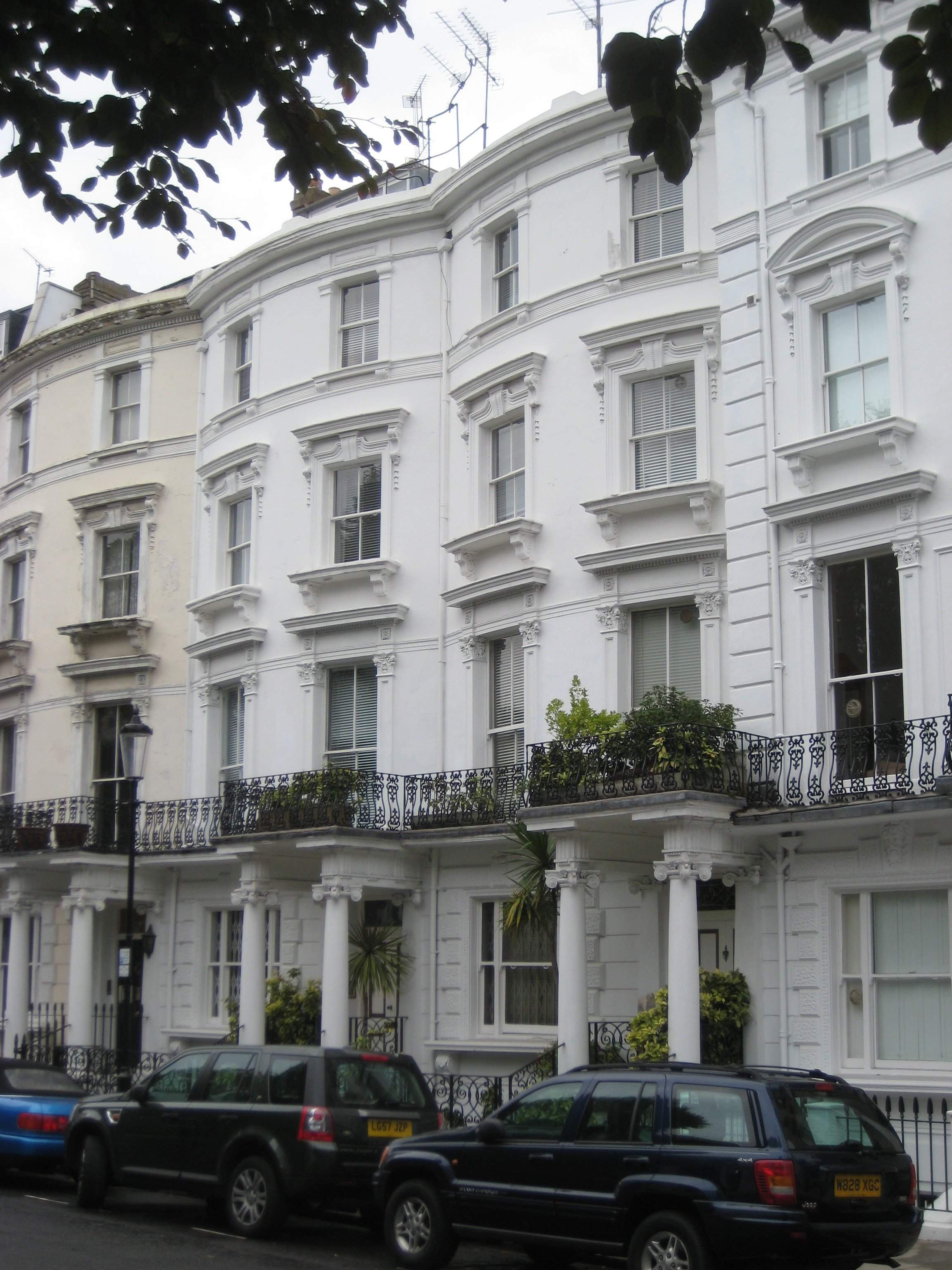
The two buildings that comprised the Samarkand Hotel in Landsdowne Crescent, where the guitarist Jimi Hendrix died in one of the two basement apartments.

Lansdowne Crescent is a crescent in Notting Hill, Holland Park, London W11, England. It lies west off Ladbroke Grove (designated the B450).

Lansdowne Crescent was developed in the early 1860s by the Wyatt family. It is named after Henry Petty-Fitzmaurice, 3rd Marquess of Lansdowne, a former Chancellor of the Exchequer, Home Secretary and Lord President of the Council.

== St John's Notting Hill ==
St John's Notting Hill, a 19th-century church that is the parish church of Notting Hill, is located here. The church hosts the annual Notting Hill Mayfest.

== Listed buildings ==
The two halves of the terrace, numbers 19-28 and 29-38 are Grade II listed as two groups of houses. They were constructed in 1860–62 by H. Wyatt.

29½ Lansdowne Crescent is a Grade II listed modernist house built in 1973, created in the gap between two existing houses by architect Jeremy Lever.

== Jimi Hendrix ==
The rock guitarist Jimi Hendrix died at the Samarkand Hotel, 22 Lansdowne Crescent, early on 18 September 1970. He had spent the latter part of the previous evening at a party, was picked up by his girlfriend Monika Dannemann, and driven to her flat at the Samarkand Hotel. According to the estimated time of death, from post mortem data and statements by friends about the evening of 17 September, he died within a few hours after midnight, though no precise estimate was made at the original inquest.
