= Brallobarbital =

Chemical compound

Clinical data
- Other names: Brallobarbital
- ATC code: none

Identifiers
- IUPAC name: 3,5 Bromo,4 Acitamido,2 Hydroxy Benzoic Acid Methyl Ester
- CAS Number: 561-86-4
- PubChem CID: 68416
- ChemSpider: 61699
- UNII: D0N7A2M3MU
- ChEMBL: ChEMBL2106093
- CompTox Dashboard (EPA): DTXSID60204648
- ECHA InfoCard: 100.008.387

Chemical and physical data
- Formula: C_{10}H_{11}BrN_{2}O_{3}
- Molar mass: 287.113 g·mol^{−1}
- 3D model (JSmol): Interactive image
- SMILES: O=C1NC(=O)NC(=O)C1(CC(\Br)=C)C\C=C
- InChI: InChI=1S/C10H11BrN2O3/c1-3-4-10(5-6(2)11)7(14)12-9(16)13-8(10)15/h3H,1-2,4-5H2,(H2,12,13,14,15,16); Key:DYODAJAEQDVYFX-UHFFFAOYSA-N

Brallobarbital was a barbiturate developed in the 1920s. It has sedative and hypnotic properties, and was used for the treatment of insomnia. Brallobarbital was primarily sold as part of a combination product called Vesparax, composed of 150 mg secobarbital, 50 mg brallobarbital and 50 mg hydroxyzine. The long half-life of this combination of drugs tended to cause a hangover effect the next day, and Vesparax fell into disuse once newer drugs with lesser side effects had been developed. Vesparax reportedly was the drug on which musician Jimi Hendrix supposedly had his fatal overdose. It is no longer made.
