= Secobarbital/brallobarbital/hydroxyzine =

Combination drug

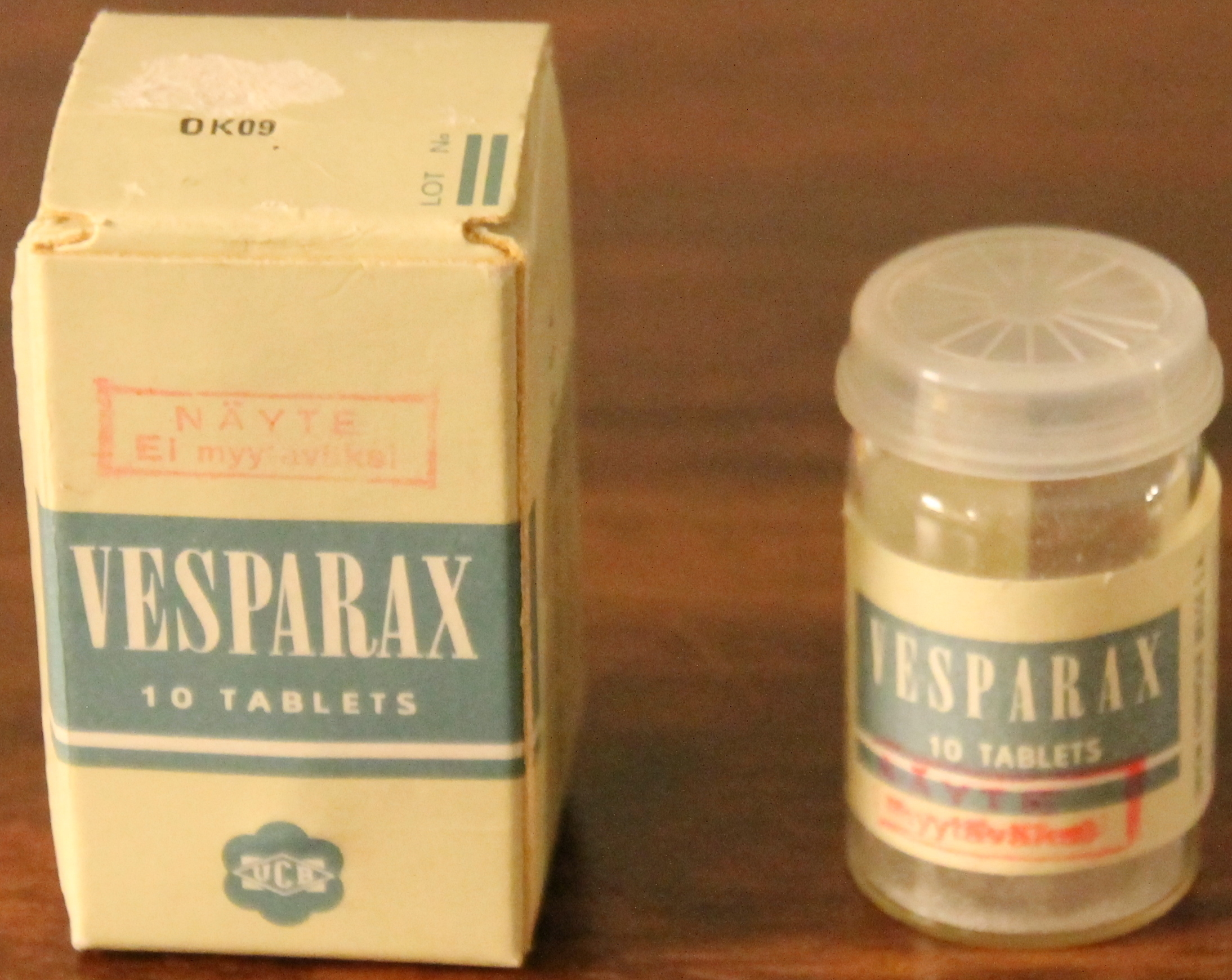

Combination of
- Brallobarbital: Barbiturate
- Secobarbital: Barbiturate
- Hydroxyzine: Antihistamine

Clinical data
- Trade names: Vesparax

Identifiers
- CAS Number: 61112-40-1

Secobarbital/brallobarbital/hydroxyzine was a combination tablet containing 50 mg brallobarbital, 150 mg secobarbital and 50 mg hydroxyzine that was used as a sedative. It was sold under the brand name Vesparax. This drug has been withdrawn from the market in most countries.

Hydroxyzine and secobarbital lengthen the half-life of brallobarbital. Because of this long half-life, it has symptoms resembling a hangover on the next day.

Jimi Hendrix was under the influence of Vesparax when he died of asphyxia due to aspiration of vomit on 18 September 1970.
