= Absolute Greatest: 40 Years True Blue =

Greatest hits album by John Williamson
- Released: 19 March 2010
- Recorded: 1970–2010
- Label: EMI Music

John Williamson chronology
Hillbilly Road (2008)	Absolute Greatest: 40 Years True Blue (2010)	John Williamson in Symphony (2011)

Singles from Absolute Greatest: 40 Years True Blue
- 1. "Island of Oceans" Released: January 2010

Absolute Greatest: 40 Years True Blue is a career spanning greatest hits album by Australian country music artist John Williamson. The album is divided into 2 discs; the first titled "Absolute Greatest" and the second "Absolute Tribute" and features 13 of Williamson's tracks recorded by other artists. The album was released in Australian in March 2010.

The album featured the a new single "Island of Oceans" with Shannon Noll. About the track Williamson said: “I have written many songs over my forty years as a recording artist in an attempt to capture the enormous spiritual power of our huge, ancient land. At last, here it is; an anthem aimed to inspire pride in our place on earth. My final song on the subject! Only time will tell whether I have succeeded.”

== Reception ==
Lauren from Sound of Oz said "Greatest hits collections are never much of a drawcard for enthusiasts who've probably got all the big tracks at home already. The covers should attract those country diehards, while those who've never bought a John Williamson album can now get all the hits in one place."

== Track listing ==
Disc 1 - Absolute Greatest
No.	Title	Writer(s)	Album	Length
1.	"Mallee Boy"	John Williamson	Mallee Boy	3:13
2.	"Raining on the Rock" (live [with Warren H. Williams])	Williamson	Anthems	4:15
3.	"Galleries of Pink Galahs"	Williamson	Mallee Boy	4:07
4.	"Hillbilly Road"	Williamson	Hillbilly Road	3:03
5.	"Flower on the Water"	Williamson	Chandelier of Stars	3:09
6.	"Rip Rip Woodchip"	Williamson	Warragul	2:57
7.	"A Bushman Can't Survive"	Williamson	Waratah St	4:10
8.	"Wrinkles"	Williamson	Fair Dinkum J.W.	4:38
9.	"Winter Green"	Williamson	Waratah St	3:35
10.	"Australia Is Another Word for Free" (with Warren H. Williams & Amos Morris)		Hillbilly Road	3:15
11.	"Salisbury Street"	Williamson	Gunyah	3:32
12.	"Cootamundra Wattle"	Williamson	Mallee Boy	3:51
13.	"Hawkesbury River Lovin'"	Williamson	All the Best	3:29
14.	"You and My Guitar"	Williamson	Road Thru the Heart	2:46
15.	"Three Sons"	Williamson	The Way It Is	3:33
16.	"Cydi"	Williamson	Hillbilly Road	2:57
17.	"Chandelier of Stars"	Williamson	Chandelier of Stars	3:12
18.	"Boogie With M'Baby" (live)	Williamson	Boogie With M'Baby Live	5:51
19.	"Diggers of the Anzac"	Williamson	True Blue	3:36
20.	"Old Man Emu"	Williamson	John Williamson	2:51
21.	"True Blue"	Williamson	Mallee Boy	4:01
22.	"Island of Oceans" (with Shannon Noll)	Williamson	new recording	2:56

Disc 2 - Absolute Tribute
No.	Title	Writer(s)	Length
1.	"Flower on the Water" (by Wendy Matthews)	Williamson	3:20
2.	"Salisbury Street" (by The Waifs)	Williamson	4:48
3.	"Galleries of Pink Galahs" (by Shannon Noll)	Williamson	4:13
4.	"Cootamundra Wattle" (by Kasey Chambers)	Williamson	5:02
5.	"Chandelier of Stars" (by James Reyne)	Williamson	3:32
6.	"Paint Me a Wheelbarrow" (by Sara Storer and Greg Storer)	Williamson	3:39
7.	"Tubbo Station" (by Songbirds)	Williamson	4:23
8.	"You and My Guitar" (by Ash Grunwald)	Williamson	5:25
9.	"Truckie's Wife" (by Ami Williamson)	Williamson	4:18
10.	"Raining on the Rock" (by Troy Cassar-Daley)	Williamson	3:50
11.	"Wintergreen" (by The Ordinary Fear of God)	Williamson	4:03
12.	"Hillbilly Road" (by Adam Harvey)	Williamson	3:12
13.	"Old Man Emu" (by Tommy Emmanuel)	Williamson	3:19

== Charts ==
=== Weekly charts ===
Chart (2010)	Peak position
Australian Albums (ARIA)	23

=== Year-end charts ===
Chart (2010)	Position
ARIA Country Albums Chart	9

== Release history ==
Country	Date	Format	Label	Catalogue
Australia	19 March 2010	2xCD; DD	EMI Music	6274852

== Certifications ==
Region	Certification	Certified units/sales
Australia (ARIA)	Gold	35,000^{^}
^{^} Shipments figures based on certification alone.
