= The Platinum Collection (John Williamson album) =

Greatest hits album by John Williamson
- Released: 26 August 2006
- Recorded: 1970–2005
- Length: 214:28
- Label: GumLeaf Records EMI Music

John Williamson chronology
County Classics 2 (2006)	The Platinum Collection (2006)	Wildlife Warriors (2006)

The Platinum Collection is a career spanning greatest hits album by Australian country music artist John Williamson. The album was released in August 2006, peaked at number 25 on the ARIA Charts and was certified platinum in 2009.

== Track listing ==
Disc 1
No.	Title	Writer(s)	Length
1.	"Old Man Emu"	John Williamson	2:51
2.	"The Breaker" (with Bud Tingwell)	Williamson	4:05
3.	"True Blue"	Williamson	4:02
4.	"Hawkesbury River Lovin'"	Williamson	3:29
5.	"Diggers of the Anzac (This Is Gallipoli)"	Williamson	3:37
6.	"Wrinkles"	Williamson	4:37
7.	"And the Band Played Waltzing Matilda" (live)	Eric Bogle	6:18
8.	"Good Tobacci When I Smoke" (live)	Slim Dusty	3:06
9.	"Queen in the Sport of Kings" (live)	Williamson	4:03
10.	"I'll Be Gone"	Mike Rudd	3:54
11.	"The Shed"	Williamson	2:38
12.	"You and My Guitar"	Williamson	2:47
13.	"Goodbye Blinky Bill" (featuring Bullamakanka and Ami & George Williamson)	Williamson	3:30
14.	"Just a Dog"	Williamson	3:18
15.	"Billabong" (live)	Williamson	3:16
16.	"I Can't Feel Those Chains Any Longer" (live)	Williamson	3:32
17.	"The Vasectomy Song" (live)	Williamson	3:52
18.	"Home Among The Gum Trees" (live)	Wally Johnson, Bob Brown	3:01
19.	"Mallee Boy"	Williamson	3:14
20.	"Galleries of Pink Galahs"	Williamson	4:10

Disc 2
No.	Title	Writer(s)	Length
1.	"Raining on the Rock"	John Williamson	4:32
2.	"Cracker Night"	Williamson	2:56
3.	"Cootamundra Wattle"	Williamson	3:53
4.	"The Budgie Song"	Williamson	2:42
5.	"Diamantina Drover"	Hugh McDonald	3:03
6.	"Sail the Nullarbor"	Williamson	3:17
7.	"Boomerang Café"	Williamson	3:29
8.	"Boogie with M' Baby" (live)	Williamson	5:22
9.	"Bill the Cat"	Williamson	3:32
10.	"Rip Rip Woodchip"	Williamson	2:56
11.	"Shelter"	Bogle	2:49
12.	"Big Bad Bushranger"	Bob Brown	2:40
13.	"Waratah Street"	Williamson	3:11
14.	"A Bushman Can't Survive"	Williamson	4:10
15.	"A Flag of Our Own"	Williamson	3:28
16.	"Papa Whisky November"	Williamson	3:19
17.	"This Is Australia Calling"	Williamson, Rob Fairbairn	3:55
18.	"Tropical Fever"	Williamson	3:30
19.	"Vegie Bill"	Williamson	3:44
20.	"Prettiest Girl in the Kimberley"	Williamson	3:43
21.	"Sir Don"	Williamson	3:14

Disc 3
No.	Title	Writer(s)	Length
1.	"Campfire on the Road"	John Williamson	3:35
2.	"A Thousand Feet" (with Warren H. Williams)	Williamson	2:54
3.	"Three Sons"	Williamson	3:33
4.	"Purple Roses"	Williamson	3:14
5.	"This Ancient Land: Corroboree 2000" (with Jimmy Little)	Williamson	3:08
6.	"The Land of the Truly Free"	Williamson	3:11
7.	"The Baggy Green" (featuring Steve Waugh and The Boys of the Bankstown District Cricket Association)	Williamson, Gavin Robertson, Steve Waugh	2:51
8.	"A Number on My Back" (The Wallaby Anthem)	Williamson	3:40
9.	"Waltzing Matilda 2000"	Banjo Patterson	3:48
10.	"Sing You the Outback"	Williamson	3:45
11.	"Cape York Peninsula"	Williamson	3:02
12.	"Salisbury Street"	Williamson	3:32
13.	"Buried in Her Bedclothes"	Williamson	2:41
14.	"Raining on the Plains" (with Sara Storer)	Williamson, Garth Porter, Sara Storer, Doug Storer	3:04
15.	"Old Farts in Caravan Parks"	Williamson	3:44
16.	"Glory to Australia" (with Pixie Jenkins and Warren H. Williams)	Williamson	2:59
17.	"Mates on the Road" (with Pixie Jenkins and Warren H. Williams)	Williamson	2:39
18.	"Chandelier of Stars"	Williamson	3:13
19.	"Desert Child" (featuring Warren H. Williams)	Williamson, Warren H. Williams	3:09
20.	"Flower on the Water"	Williamson	3:09
21.	"We Love This Country"	Williamson	2:48

== Charts ==
=== Weekly charts ===
Chart (2006)	Peak position
Australian Albums (ARIA)	25

=== Year-end charts ===
Chart (2006)	Position
ARIA Australian Artist Albums Chart	44
ARIA Country Albums Chart	8
Chart (2007)	Position
ARIA Country Albums Chart	20
Chart (2008)	Position
ARIA Country Albums Chart	27
Chart (2009)	Position
ARIA Country Albums Chart	42

== Release history ==
Country	Date	Format	Label	Catalogue
Australia	26 August 2006	3xCD	GumLeaf Records EMI Music	094637362624

== Certifications ==
Region	Certification	Certified units/sales
Australia (ARIA)	Platinum	70,000^{^}
^{^} Shipments figures based on certification alone.
