= Hell of a Career =

Greatest hits album by John Williamson
- Released: 19 July 2013
- Recorded: 1970–2013
- Length: 155:11
- Label: Warner Music Australia

John Williamson chronology
The Big Red (2012)	Hell of a Career (2013)	Honest People (2014)

Hell of a Career is a greatest hits album by Australian country music artist John Williamson. The album was released in July 2013 and peaked at number 24 on the ARIA charts. The album features 44 tracks including a never before released studio version of "Island of Oceans" plus live recordings of "Hang My Hat in Queensland", "Prairie Hotel Parachilna" and "Rescue Me".

The album coincided with Warner Music Australia digital re-release of 13 of Williamson's albums.

== Track listing ==
Disc 1
No.	Title	Writer(s)	Length
1.	"Old Man Emu"	John Williamson	2:51
2.	"True Blue" (21st Anniversary version)	Williamson	4:06
3.	"Hawkesbury River Lovin'"	Williamson	3:28
4.	"Diggers of the Anzac (This is Gallipoli)"	Williamson	3:35
5.	"Wrinkles"		4:38
6.	"Queen in the Sport of Kings"		4:03
7.	"I Can't Feel Those Chains Any Longer" (live)		3:32
8.	"Mallee Boy"	Williamson	3:12
9.	"The Budgie Song"	Williamson	2:40
10.	"Galleries of Pink Galahs"		4:09
11.	"Raining on the Rock" (live with Warren H Williams)	Williamson	4:13
12.	"Cootamudra Wattle"		3:51
13.	"Sail the Nullarbor"		3:17
14.	"Westown"		3:31
15.	"Boomerang Café"		3:31
16.	"Amazing Day"		3:10
17.	"Boogie with M'Baby" (live)		5:22
18.	"Ancient Mountains"		4:39
19.	"Bill the Cat"		3:35
20.	"Dingo"		3:24
21.	"Goodbye Blinky Bill"	Williamson	3:29

Disc 2
No.	Title	Writer(s)	Length
1.	"Island of Oceans"		2:12
2.	"Rip Rip Woodchip"	Williamson	2:57
3.	"A Flag of Our Own"	Williamson	3:28
4.	"A Bushman Can't Survive" (orchestra version)		3:45
5.	"Wintergreen"		3:35
6.	"Papa Whisky November"		3:19
7.	"Pretties Girl in the Kimberley" (orchestra version)		3:04
8.	"Sir Don"	Williamson	3:12
9.	"Three Sons"		3:34
10.	"A Thousand Feet" (with Warren H Williams)		2:55
11.	"Baggy Green" (featuring Steve Waugh and the Boys of The Bankstown District Cricket Association)	Williamson, Gavin Robertson and Steve Waugh	2:49
12.	"Sing You the Outback"		3:45
13.	"Salisbury Street"		3:32
14.	"Glory to Australia"		3:00
15.	"Chandelier of Stars"		3:13
16.	"Flower On the Water"		3:09
17.	"The Joy Is In the Journey"		3:32
18.	"Hillbilly Road"		3:04
19.	"Cydi"		2:57
20.	"The Big Red"		3:46
21.	"Hang My Hat in Queensland" (Orchestra version)		4:44
22.	"Prairie Hotel Parachilna" (Orchestra version)		3:03
23.	"Rescue Me" (Orchestra version)		4:21

== Charts ==
=== Weekly charts ===
Chart (2013)	Peak position
Australian Albums (ARIA)	24

=== Year-end charts ===
Chart (2013)	Position
ARIA Australian Artist Albums Chart	47
ARIA Country Albums Chart	15
Chart (2014)	Position
ARIA Country Albums Chart	45
Chart (2015)	Position
ARIA Country Albums Chart	28
Chart (2016)	Position
ARIA Country Albums Chart	47
Chart (2017)	Position
ARIA Country Albums Chart	76

== Release history ==
Country	Date	Format	Label	Catalogue
Australia	19 July 2013	2xCD; DD	Warner Music	5310584302
