= True Blue – The Very Best of John Williamson =

Compilation album by John Williamson
- Released: November 1995
- Recorded: May 1970 – September 1995
- Genre: Country, folk, pop
- Length: 2:02:19
- Label: EMI Music
- Producer: John Williamson

John Williamson chronology
Mulga to Mangoes (1994)	True Blue – The Very Best of John Williamson (1995)	Family Album No.2 (1996)

Singles from True Blue – The Very Best of John Williamson
- 1. "No One Loves Brisbane Like Jesus" Released: November 1995

True Blue – The Very Best of John Williamson is a compilation album by Australian country music artist John Williamson, and was released in November 1995. The album was a celebration of 25 years in the music industry for Williamson. The album peaked at number 21 on the ARIA Charts, and was certified 3× platinum in 2006.

Williamson released a book titled True Blue featuring Williamson's lyrics together with explanations as to how the songs came to be written. During the book's launch, Williamson is surprised by Mike Munro from Nine Network This Is Your Life to have his achievements recognized on the TV show.

At the ARIA Music Awards of 1996, the album was nominated for Highest Selling Album.

== Track listing ==
Disc 1
No.	Title	Writer(s)	Length
1.	"You and My Guitar"	John Williamson	2:47
2.	"Goodbye Blinky Bill" (with Bullamakanka and Ami & George Williamson)	Williamson	3:30
3.	"Just a Dog"	Williamson	3:20
4.	"Wrinkles"	Williamson	4:38
5.	"Diggers of the ANZAC"	Williamson	3:37
6.	"Old Man Emu"	Williamson	2:52
7.	"The Shed"	Williamson, Tony Dennett	2:39
8.	"Hawkesbury River Lovin'"	Williamson	3:31
9.	"The Breaker" (with Bud Tingwell)	Williamson	4:04
10.	"I'm Fair Dinkum" (live)	Williamson	3:29
11.	"The Bush Barber (The Lawnmower song)" (live)	Williamson	3:00
12.	"Bush Town" (live)	Williamson	2:38
13.	"Dad's Flowers" (live)	Dennett	3:42
14.	"Billabong" (live)	Williamson	3:15
15.	"Chain Around My Ankle" (live)	Williamson	2:32
16.	"I Can't Feel Those Chains Any Longer" (live)	Williamson	3:31
17.	"The Vasectomy Song" (live)	Williamson	3:52
18.	"Stuffed If I Know" (live)	B.J Vidler, Williamson	3:36
19.	"Home Among The Gum Trees" (live)	Wally Johnson, Bob Brown	3:03
20.	"Waltzing Matilda"	Banjo Patterson	3:14
21.	"No One Loves Brisbane Like Jesus" (live)	Williamson	3:55
Total length:			1:10:45

Disc 2
No.	Title	Writer(s)	Length
1.	"(This Is) Australia Calling"	Rob Fairbairn, John Williamson	3:58
2.	"I'll Be Gone"	Michael Rudd	3:34
3.	"Rip Rip Woodchip"	Williamson	3:02
4.	"Mallee Boy"	Williamson	3:16
5.	"Cracker Night"	Williamson	2:58
6.	"The Boomerang Café"	Williamson	3:31
7.	"The Budgie Song"	Williamson	2:41
8.	"Boogie with M' Baby"	Williamson	5:25
9.	"I'm in the Mood"	Williamson	2:55
10.	"Waratah Street"	Williamson	3:12
11.	"A Bushman Can't Survive"	Williamson	4:12
12.	"Drover's Boy"	Ted Egan	3:37
13.	"Papa Whisky November"	Williamson	3:21
14.	"Crocodile Roll"	Tony Dennett, Williamson	2:46
15.	"Cootamundra Wattle"	Williamson	3:53
16.	"Shelter"	Eric Bogle	2:52
17.	"Bill the Cat"	Williamson	3:39
18.	"Beachcomber from Wollongong"	Williamson	2:26
19.	"Galleries of Pink Galahs"	Williamson	4:11
20.	"Raining on the Rock"	Williamson	4:33
21.	"A Flag of Our Own"	Williamson	3:30
22.	"True Blue"	Williamson	4:02
Total length:			1:16:34

== Charts ==
=== Weekly charts ===
Weekly chart performance for True Blue – The Very Best of John Williamson
Chart (1995–99)	Peak position
Australian Albums (ARIA)	21
New Zealand Albums (RMNZ)	33

=== Year-end charts ===
1995 year-end chart performance for True Blue – The Very Best of John Williamson
Chart (1995)	Rank
Australian Albums (ARIA)	96

== Certifications ==
Region	Certification	Certified units/sales
Australia (ARIA)	3× Platinum	210,000^{^}
^{^} Shipments figures based on certification alone.

== Release history ==
Country	Date	Format	Label	Catalogue
Australia	November 1995	2xCD	EMI Music	8146312
