= Anthems (John Williamson album) =

Greatest hits album by John Williamson
- Released: August 2000
- Length: 65:53
- Label: EMI Music
- Producer: John Williamson

John Williamson chronology
Australia (1999)	Anthems (2000)	Gunyah (2002)

Singles from Anthems
- 1. "This Ancient Land" Released: May 2000; 2. "Waltzing Matilda" Released: July 2000

Anthems (subtitled A Celebration of Australia) is a greatest hits album by Australian country music artist John Williamson and was released in August 2000. The album features 20 of Williamson's most patriotic recordings, peaked at number 16 on the ARIA Charts and was certified gold.

The album's release coincided with the 2000 Olympic Games in Sydney in which Williamson performed.

== Track listing ==
No.	Title	Writer(s)	Length
1.	"True Blue"	John Williamson	4:02
2.	"Home Among The Gum Trees"	Wally Johnson, Bob Brown	2:48
3.	"Rip Rip Woodchip"	Williamson	3:02
4.	"This Ancient Land: Corroboree 2000" (featuring Jimmy Little)	Williamson	3:10
5.	"Galleries of Pink Galahs"	Williamson	4:09
6.	"Diggers of the Anzac"	Williamson	3:37
7.	"Sydney 2000"	Williamson	3:26
8.	"Advance Australia Fair"	Peter Dodds McCormick	1:15
9.	"River Crying Out"	Williamson	3:34
10.	"This Is Australia Calling"	Williamson	3:31
11.	"The Land of the Truly Free"	Williamson	3:11
12.	"My Oath to Australia"	Williamson	2:59
13.	"Diamantina Drover"	Hugh McDonald	3:03
14.	"Raining on the Rock" (featuring Warren H. Williams)	Williamson	4:15
15.	"A Flag of Our Own"	Williamson	3:30
16.	"Sir Don"	Williamson	3:12
17.	"The Baggy Green" (with Steve Waugh)	Williamson, Steve Waugh, Gavin Robinson,	2:54
18.	"A Number on My Back" (The Wallaby Anthem)	Williamson	3:36
19.	"Waltzing Matilda 2000" (with 100,000 voices at the Bledisloe Cup [August 1999])	Banjo Patterson	3:50
20.	"Shelter"	Eric Bogle	2:49

== Charts ==
Chart (2000)	Peak position
Australian Albums (ARIA)	16

== Certifications ==
Region	Certification	Certified units/sales
Australia (ARIA)	Gold	35,000^{^}
^{^} Shipments figures based on certification alone.

== Release history ==
Country	Date	Format	Label	Catalogue
Australia	August 2000	CD	GumLeaf, EMI Music	724352768127
