= His Favourite Collection =

Greatest hits album by John Williamson
- Released: 19 August 2016
- Recorded: 1970–2016
- Label: Warner Music Australia

John Williamson chronology
Looking for a Story (2016)	His Favourite Collection (2016)	Butcherbird (2018)

Singles from His Favourite Collection
- 1. "Aussie Girls" Released: June 2016

His Favourite Collection is a 50 track, 4xCD greatest hits album by Australian country music artist John Williamson. The album was released in August 2016 and peaked at number 9 on the ARIA charts. The album was supported by a national tour between August and November 2016. The lead and only single from the album "Aussie Girls" is a tribute to Australian sports women.

When asked how he selected the 50 tracks, Williamson said "I wanted to do a compilation of love songs because I had one of those years ago but there's been a lot more love songs and better ones, so I've got that. I've always wanted to do a tropical one, so there's another CD called Willo Goes Troppo – which is all my songs about Northern Australia, which tend to have a bit of a calypso feel to it, like "Cape York Peninsula" and those songs. The other one is country music ballads and the other one's a sing-along."

== Track listing ==
Disc 1 - Willo Goes Troppo
No.	Title	Length
1.	"Island of Oceans"	2:12
2.	"Amazing Day"	3:12
3.	"Papa Whisky November"	3:19
4.	"Tropical Fever"	4:00
5.	"Tomorrow's Worries"	2:19
6.	"Frangipani Bay"	3:02
7.	"Cape York Peninsula"	3:04
8.	"Flower On the Water"	3:13
9.	"Beach of Love"	3:11
10.	"Hang My Hat in Queensland" (Orchestra version)	4:44
11.	"Crocodile Roll"	2:46
12.	"Queensland Bungalow"	3:38

Disc 2 - True Blue Love
No.	Title	Writer(s)	Length
1.	"You and My Guitar"		2:49
2.	"Chandelier of Stars"		3:15
3.	"Boomerang Café"	Williamson	3:30
4.	"Aussie Girls"		3:00
5.	"Prettiest Girl In the Kimberley"		3:47
6.	"Better Than a Picture"		2:50
7.	"One More for the Road"		2:36
8.	"Call Me Blue"	Williamson	2:21
9.	"Drink a Little Love"		3:11
10.	"Cootamundra Wattle"		3:52
11.	"Wintergreen"		3:38
12.	"Wrinkles"	Williamson	4:38
13.	"Dark Irish Eyes"		3:33
14.	"Rescue Me"		3:50
15.	"Keep Walking"		3:55

Disc 3 - Singalong
No.	Title	Writer(s)	Length
1.	"Rip Rip Woodchip"	Williamson	3:02
2.	"True Blue" (21st Anniversary Version)	Williamson	4:06
3.	"Dingo"		3:22
4.	"Waltzing Matilda"	Banjo Patterson	4:02
5.	"It's All About Love"		3:20
6.	"Girt By Sea"		2:54
7.	"The Big Red"		3:47
8.	"A Number On My Back"	Williamson	3:43
9.	"I'm a Basher"		3:19
10.	"Mallee Boy"	Williamson	3:17
11.	"A Flag of Our Own"		3:30
12.	"Sail the Nullarbor"		3:18
13.	"Diggers of the Anzac (This is Gallipoli)"		3:35

Disc 4 - Country Ballads
No.	Title	Writer(s)	Length
1.	"Aussie Balladeer"		2:53
2.	"Bells In a Bushman's Ear"		2:42
3.	"Campfire On the Road"		3:35
4.	"Thargomindah (The Way It Is)"		3:33
5.	"Look Out Cunnamulla"		2:59
6.	"Three Sons"		3:33
7.	"Looking for a Story"		2:30
8.	"A Bushman Can't Survive"	Williamson	3:48
9.	"Around Jindabyne"		3:33
10.	"Granny's Little Gunyah"		2:58
11.	"A Thousand Feet"		2:50
12.	"Honest People"	Williamson	3:15
13.	"You Come Back to Tassie"		3:20
14.	"Skinny Dingoes"		3:21
15.	"Sing You the Outback"		3:47
16.	"Ancient Mountains"		4:32

== Charts ==
=== Weekly charts ===
Chart (2016)	Peak position
Australian Albums (ARIA)	9

=== Year-end charts ===
Chart (2016)	Position
ARIA Australian Artist Albums Chart	41
ARIA Country Albums Chart	6
Chart (2017)	Position
ARIA Country Albums Chart	27
Chart (2018)	Position
ARIA Country Albums Chart	56
Chart (2019)	Position
ARIA Country Albums Chart	50
Chart (2020)	Position
ARIA Country Albums Chart	47
Chart (2021)	Position
Australian Country Albums (ARIA)	38

== Release history ==
Country	Date	Format	Label	Catalogue
Australia	19 August 2016	4xCD; DD; streaming	Tailfeather, Warner Music	5419724752
