= True Blue Two =

Compilation album by John Williamson
- Released: August 2003
- Label: GumLeaf, EMI Music

John Williamson chronology
Gunyah (2002)	True Blue Two (2003)	Mates on the Road (2004)

Singles from True Blue Two
- 1. "Keep Australia Beautiful" Released: March 2003; 2. "True Blue" Released: July 2003

True Blue Two is a compilation album by Australian country music artist John Williamson. The title is the second True Blue compilation following True Blue – The Very Best of John Williamson released in 1995. Similarly, Williamson released a book of the same title with the song background and lyrics.

True Blue Two was released in August 2003, and peaked at number 8 on the ARIA Charts and was certified gold

== Track listing ==
Disc 1
No.	Title	Writer(s)	Length
1.	"True Blue" (with Orchestra)	John Williamson
2.	"You Are Very Welcome" (with Warren H. Williams)	Williamson
3.	"Keep Australia Beautiful"	Williamson
4.	"Sing You the Outback"	Williamson
5.	"A Thousand Feet" (with Warren H. Williams)	Williamson
6.	"Campfire on the Road"	Williamson
7.	"Three Sons"	Williamson
8.	"Raining on the Plains" (featuring Sara Storer)	Williamson, Garth Porter, Sara Storer, Doug Storer	3:08
9.	"On the Improve"	Williamson
10.	"Amazing Day"	Williamson
11.	"Back at the Isa"	Williamson
12.	"Vegie Bill"	Williamson
13.	"Prettiest Girl in the Kimberley"	Williamson
14.	"At Lightning Ridge"	Williamson
15.	"Coolabah Blue"	Williamson
16.	"Camel Train to Yamba"	Williamson
17.	"Old Farts in Caravan Parks" (live)	Williamson
18.	"Buried in Her Bedclothes"	Williamson
19.	"Wonthaggi"	Williamson
20.	"Tropical Fever"	Williamson
21.	"Mountain Hideaway"	Williamson

Disc 2
No.	Title	Writer(s)	Length
1.	"Raining on the Rock" (live with Warren H. Williams)	John Williamson
2.	"Forty Years Ago"	Williamson
3.	"Dusty Road We Know"	Williamson
4.	"Truckies Wife"	Williamson
5.	"Purple Roses"	Williamson
6.	"Woman On the Land"	Williamson
7.	"Salisbury Street"	Williamson
8.	"It's a Way of Life"	Williamson
9.	"My Dad Snores"	Williamson
10.	"Kitchy Kitchy Koo"	Williamson
11.	"Big Brother Little Brother"	Williamson
12.	"Big Bad Bushranger"	Bob Brown
13.	"A Mighty Big River"	Williamson
14.	"This Ancient Land" (featuring Jimmy Little)	Williamson
15.	"You Came Back to Tassie"	Williamson
16.	"Sail the Nullabor"	Williamson
17.	"The Baggy Green" (featuring Steve Waugh)	Williamson, Steve Waugh, Gavin Robinson	2:54
18.	"Sir Don"	Williamson	3:12
19.	"The Kiwi and the Emu"	Williamson
20.	"A Number On My Back" (The Wallaby Anthem)	Williamson	3:36
21.	"Waltzing Matilda" (Rugby Version)	Banjo Patterson

== Charts ==
=== Weekly charts ===
Chart (2003)	Peak position
Australian Albums (ARIA)	8

=== Year-end charts ===
Chart (2003)	Position
ARIA Country Albums Chart	8

== Certifications ==
Region	Certification	Certified units/sales
Australia (ARIA)	Gold	35,000^{^}
^{^} Shipments figures based on certification alone.

== Release history ==
Country	Date	Format	Label	Catalogue
Australia	August 2003	2xCD	GumLeaf, EMI Music	724359238326, 5923832
