= Australia Calling – All the Best Vol 2 =

Greatest hits album by John Williamson
- Released: October 1992
- Genre: Country, folk, pop
- Label: EMI Music
- Producer: John Williamson

John Williamson chronology
Waratah St (1991)	Australia Calling – All the Best Vol 2 (1992)	Love Is a Good Woman (1993)

Singles from Australia Calling – All the Best Vol 2
- 1. "(This Is) Australia Calling" Released: September 1992; 2. "I'll Be Gone" Released: November 1992

Australia Calling – All the Best Vol 2 is a greatest hits album by Australian country music artist John Williamson. The album is the second All the Best following the first edition released in 1986. Australia Calling – All the Best Vol 2 was released in October 1992 and peaked at number 32 on the ARIA Charts and was certified platinum in 1994.

== Track listing ==
No.	Title	Writer(s)	Length
1.	"(This Is) Australia Calling"	John Williamson	3:58
2.	"I'll Be Gone"	Mike Rudd	3:34
3.	"Rip Rip Woodchip"	Williamson	3:02
4.	"Mallee Boy"	Williamson	3:16
5.	"Cracker Night"	Williamson	2:58
6.	"The Boomerang Café"	Williamson	3:31
7.	"The Budgie Song"	Williamson	2:41
8.	"Boogie with M' Baby"	Williamson	5:25
9.	"I'm in the Mood"	Williamson	2:55
10.	"Waratah Street"	Williamson	3:12
11.	"A Bushman Can't Survive"	Williamson	4:12
12.	"Drover's Boy"	Williamson	3:37
13.	"Papa Whisky November"	Williamson	3:21
14.	"Crocodile Roll"	Williamson	2:46
15.	"Cootamundra Wattle"	Williamson	3:53
16.	"Shelter"	Williamson	2:52
17.	"Bill the Cat"	Williamson	3:39
18.	"Beachcomber from Wollongong"	Williamson	2:26
19.	"Galleries of Pink Galahs"	Williamson	4:11
20.	"Raining on the Rock"	Williamson	4:33
21.	"A Flag of Our Own"	Williamson	3:30
22.	"True Blue"	Williamson	4:02
Total length:			1:17:34

== Charts ==
Chart performance for Australia Calling – All the Best Vol 2
Chart (1992–1993)	Peak position
Australian Albums (ARIA)	32

== Certifications ==
Region	Certification	Certified units/sales
Australia (ARIA)	Platinum	70,000^{^}
^{^} Shipments figures based on certification alone.

== Release history ==
Country	Date	Format	Label	Catalogue
Australia	October 1992	CD; Cassette	EMI Music	7806444
