= Hillbilly Road =

Studio album by John Williamson
- Released: 13 August 2008
- Recorded: 2008
- Length: 35:45
- Label: GumLeaf, EMI Music
- Producer: John Williamson

John Williamson chronology
Quambatook (2008)	Hillbilly Road (2008)	Absolute Greatest: 40 Years True Blue (2010)

Singles from Hillbilly Road
- 1. "Drink a Little Love" Released: 2008; 2. "Cydi" Released: 2008; 3. "Hillbilly Road" Released: 2008; 4. "Australia Is Another Word for Free" Released: January 2009; 5. "Better Than a Picture" Released: June 2009

Hillbilly Road is the seventeenth studio album by Australian country music artist John Williamson. It was released in August 2008 and peaked at number 6 on the ARIA Charts. The album was certified gold in July 2009. The album was inspired by Williamson's retreat in the Queensland hinterland and supported with a national tour across late 2008 and into 2009.

At the Country Music Awards of Australia in January 2009, Williamson was nominated for six awards; APRA Song of the Year, Album of the Year, Male Artist of the Year, Heritage Song of the Year, Bush Ballad of the Year and Vocal Collaboration of the Year. Williamson won one award "Bush Ballad of the Year" for ""Australia Is Another Word for Free" with Warren H Williams and Amos Morris

== Singles ==
Five singles were released off the album across 2008 and 2009; "Drink a Little Love", "Cydi", "Hillbilly Road", "Australia Is Another Word for Free" and "Better Than a Picture".

== Reception ==
Professional ratings
Review scores
Source	Rating
AllMusic	3/5 stars

Adam Greenberg from AllMusic said "Williamson's sound is by and large in a strong John Denver vein, with an optimistic, warm sound, and a fairly natural guitar tone. A few Aboriginal sounds creep into the mix from time to time, but seem to stand in comfortably and naturally, rather than as an afterthought or a simple nod to the outback that Williamson calls home. The music is simple and warm, built with a touch of timelessness that's almost intentional, but not quite to the degree that it can be called out. It's a fine album, and has just enough vocal goodness to pull in a few listeners from outside of the country realm. "

== Track listing ==
No.	Title	Writer(s)	Length
1.	"Flowers on the Concrete"	John Williamson	2:32
2.	"Drink a Little Love"	Williamson	3:11
3.	"Dark Irish Eyes"	Williamson	3:33
4.	"Hillbilly Road"	Williamson	3:04
5.	"Catch a Virgin"	Williamson	2:22
6.	"Cydi"	Williamson	3:00
7.	"Pmarra Knatcha (My Home in the Bush)" (with Warren H. Williams)	Williamson, Warren H. Williams	3:15
8.	"Australia Is Another Word for Free" (with Warren H. Williams and Amos Morris)	Williamson	2:50
9.	"Better Than a Picture"		2:09
10.	"Rivers, Wood 'n' Wire"	Williamson	3:11
11.	"Beach of Love"	Williamson	2:34
12.	"Tomorrow's Worries"	Williamson	3:33

== Charts ==
=== Weekly charts ===
Chart (2008)	Peak position
Australian Albums (ARIA)	6

=== Year-end charts ===
Chart (2008)	Position
ARIA Country Albums Chart	6
ARIA Australian Artist Albums Chart	39
Chart (2009)	Position
ARIA Country Albums Chart	41

== Certifications ==
Region	Certification	Certified units/sales
Australia (ARIA)	Gold	35,000^{^}
^{^} Shipments figures based on certification alone.

== Release history ==
Country	Date	Format	Label	Catalogue
Australia	13 August 2008	CD; DD	Gumleaf, EMI Music	2163402
