= JW's Family Album =

Studio album by John Williamson
- Released: October 1990
- Genre: Children's
- Label: Gumleaf Records, Festival Records, EMI Music
- Producer: John Williamson

John Williamson chronology
Warragul (1989)	JW's Family Album (1990)	Waratah St (1991)

Singles from Warragul
- 1. "Old Man Emu (new version)" Released: October 1990; 2. "Christmas Photo" Released: November 1990

JW's Family Album is the ninth studio album by Australian country music artist John Williamson. The album was released in October 1990 and peaked at number 21 on the ARIA Charts and was certified platinum. It included a re-recording of Williamson's debut single "Old Man Emu", including an additional verse.

At the ARIA Music Awards of 1991, the album was nominated for the ARIA Award for Best Children's Album.

At the Country Music Awards of Australia of 1992, the album won Top Selling Album.

== Track listing ==
No.	Title	Writer(s)	Length
1.	"Christmas Photo"	John Williamson	3:33
2.	"Camel Train To Yamba"	Williamson	2:24
3.	"Teach Me to Drive, Dad"	Williamson	3:08
4.	"Just a Dog"	Williamson	3:22
5.	"Flight of the Blowfly"	Williamson	1:57
6.	"Goodbye Blinky Bill"	Williamson	3:33
7.	"Crocodile Roll"	Williamson, Tony Dennett	2:46
8.	"On My Ukulele"	Lou Herscher, Mike Morris, Mitchell Parish	2:30
9.	"Big Bad Banksia Man"	Williamson	2:24
10.	"Old Man Emu"	Williamson	3:11
11.	"Koala Koala"	Williamson	2:38
12.	"My Dad Snores"	Williamson	2:32
13.	"Old Sow"	Williamson	1:19
14.	"When We Were Kids" (featuring Norma Murphy)	Williamson, Norma Murphy	3:41
15.	"A Proud Man (Allan Border)"	Williamson	2:53
16.	"Home Among the Gum Trees"	Wally Johnson, Bob Brown	2:50

== Charts ==
Chart (1990/91)	Peak position
Australian Albums (ARIA)	21

== Certifications ==
Region	Certification	Certified units/sales
Australia (ARIA)	Platinum	70,000^{^}
^{^} Shipments figures based on certification alone.

== Release history ==
Country	Date	Format	Label	Catalogue
Australia	October 1990	Vinyl Record; CD; Cassette	Gum Leaf, Festival Records, EMI Music	93337
