= Looking for a Story =

Diggers of the Anzac/Looking for a Story

EP by John Williamson
- Released: 5 April 2015
- Length: 28:17

John Williamson chronology
Honest People (2014)	Diggers of the Anzac/Looking for a Story (2015)	His Favourite Collection (2016)

Singles from Looking for a Story
- 1. "Looking for a Story" Released: April 2016

Alternative cover
- Looking for a Story (2016 release)

Diggers of the Anzac is an extended play (EP) by Australian country music artist John Williamson, it is an consisting of six previously released material. It was released in April 2015 and peaked at number 100 on the ARIA Charts.

On 22 April 2016, the EP was re-released under the title Looking for a Story, which included the new track "Looking for a Story". The EP peaked at number 32 on the ARIA Charts. Williamson performed "Looking for a Story" live on Sunrise on 25 April 2016.

== Track listing ==
No.	Title	Writer(s)	Length
1.	"Looking for a Story" (on the 2016 edition only)	John Williamson	2:30
2.	"Diggers of the Anzac (This Is Gallipoli)"	Williamson	3:35
3.	"Waltzing Matilda 2000"	Banjo Paterson	3:50
4.	"Girt by Sea"	Williamson	2:54
5.	"I Was Only 19" (live)	John Schumann	5:04
6.	"And the Band Played Waltzing Matilda"	Eric Bogle	6:18
7.	"True Blue" (21st Anniversary Version)	Williamson	4:06

== Charts ==
=== Weekly charts ===
Chart (2015)	Peak position
Australian Albums (ARIA)	100
Chart (2016)	Peak position
Australian Albums (ARIA)	32

=== Year-end charts ===
Chart (2016)	Position
ARIA Australian Artist Albums Chart	99

== Release history ==
Country	Title	Date	Format	Label
Australia	Diggers of the Anzac	6 April 2015	DD; streaming	Tailfeather Music/Warner Music Australia
Australia	Looking for a Story	22 April 2016	CD; DD; streaming	Tailfeather Music/Warner Music Australia
