= Quambatook (musical) =

- Original poster (2008)
- Music: John Williamson
- Lyrics: Simon Heath
- Productions: 2008 Australia

Quambatook (subtitled The Australian Folk Musical) is a Musical theatre piece written by Australian Simon Heath and John Williamson. It was directed by Bernie Zelvis. The musical is based on the early days of the Williamson family in Quambatook, Victoria, Australia and their quest to see Uluru. Williamson announced the musical in September 2007. Drew Anthony was the choreographer.

It had its world premiere at the Evan Theatre, in Penrith, NSW on 7 February 2008 and received positive audience reaction. The show had a limited 4-show run, ending on 10 February 2008.

== Plot ==
Quambatook is set in 1955 and tells the story of 11-year-old Johnno who live in the small Victorian farming town of Quambatook. For years, he and his family have happily sat around the radio, listened, sang and played along with songs from "The Silver Haired Showman's" weekly radio show. But ever since Johnno heard the Showman describe his experiences in the Northern Territory at Uluru, he has had only one desire; to see and experience the big red rock for himself. Whether or not they make it to Uluru isn't important, Johnno's Mum tells him in the musical, the fact is "The Joy is in the Journey".

== Cast ==
- John Williamson – narrator
- Darren Coggan
- Belinda Wollaston
- Ami Williamson – Sheila
- Shardyn Fahey-Leigh – Wil
- Benson Anthony
- Katie Ditchburn

== Concept album ==
Quambatook

Cast recording by Original Australian Cast
- Released: February 2008
- Recorded: 2007

John Williamson albums chronology
Wildlife Warriors (2006)	Quambatook (2008)	Hillbilly Road (2008)

A cast recording album was released in Australia in February 2008.

=== Track listing ===
1. "Sing You the Outback"
2. "Bush Town"
3. "My Little Ukulele"
4. "Big Brother, Little Brother"
5. "The Farming Game"
6. "Big Bad Bushranger"
7. "Aussie Balladeer"
8. "My Dad Snores"
9. "Big Bad Banksia Man"
10. "Christmas Photo"
11. "Ancient Mountains"
12. "Christmas Waltz"
13. "This Is Australia Calling"
14. "Coolibah Blue"
15. "Songs for My Guitar"
16. "Headin' for the Rock (aka Alice Springs)"
17. "The Joy Is in the Journey"
18. "Papa Whisky November"
19. "A Thousand Feet"
20. "Raining on the Rock"
21. "Old Man Emu"
