= Family Album No.2 =

Studio album by John Williamson
- Released: September 1996
- Genre: Country
- Length: 40:55
- Label: Gumleaf Records; EMI Music
- Producer: John Williamson

John Williamson chronology
True Blue – The Very Best of John Williamson (1995)	Family Album No.2 (1996)	Country Classics (1997)

Family Album No.2 is the twelfth studio album by Australian country music artist John Williamson. It was released in September 1996 as a follow-up to JW's Family Album (1990). The album later peaked at number 100 on the ARIA Charts in 2004.

The album was promoted with a national television commercial.

== Track listing ==
All tracks are written by John Williamson.

No.	Title	Writer(s)	Length
1.	"Kitchy Kitchy Koo"	John Williamson	2:28
2.	"The Timbercutter (Who Couldn't Complain)"	John Williamson	2:20
3.	"You Come Back to Tassie"	John Williamson	3:20
4.	"Santa Bring Me a Dinosaur"	John Williamson	2:30
5.	"Walkin' on the Beach"	John Williamson	2:49
6.	"Little Piss Piddle"	John Williamson	2:01
7.	"The Golden Kangaroo"	John Williamson	2:36
8.	"On Our Selection"	John Williamson	2:59
9.	"My Heart Will Find You"	John Williamson	3:43
10.	"Special Girl"	John Williamson	2:41
11.	"My Oath to Australia"	John Williamson	2:59
12.	"Big Bad Bushranger"	John Williamson	2:39
13.	"Country Football"	John Williamson	2:20
14.	"Little Brick"	John Williamson	2:16
15.	"Bananas"	John Williamson	3:14
Total length:			40:55

== Charts ==
Chart performance for Family Album No.2
Chart (2004)	Peak position
Australian Albums (ARIA)	100

== Release history ==
Country	Date	Format	Label	Catalogue
Australia	September 1996	CD	Gumleaf Records; EMI Music	
Australia	May 2003	Digital download	Gumleaf Records; EMI Music	
