= Mulga to Mangoes =

Studio album by John Williamson
- Released: August 1994
- Studio: Electric Avenue Studios
- Label: Gumleaf Records, EMI Music
- Producer: John Williamson

John Williamson chronology
Love Is a Good Woman (1993)	Mulga to Mangoes (1994)	True Blue – The Very Best of John Williamson (1995)

Singles from Mulga to Mangoes
- 1. "Seven Year Itch" Released: May 1994; 2. "River Crying Out" Released: August 1994; 3. "Tropical Fever" Released: October 1994

Mulga to Mangoes is the eleventh studio album by Australian country music artist John Williamson. The album was released in August 1994 and peaked at number 14 on the ARIA Charts and was certified gold.

At the Country Music Awards of Australia in January 1996, the album won 'Top Selling Album'.

== Track listing ==
No.	Title	Writer(s)	Length
1.	"Aussie Balladeer"	John Williamson	2:51
2.	"The Farming Game"	Williamson	3:17
3.	"Seven Year Itch"	Williamson, Tony Dennett	3:16
4.	"River Crying Out"	Williamson	4:12
5.	"The Buckled Bicycle"	Williamson	3:16
6.	"All Steamy"	Williamson	2:36
7.	"Sydney 2000"	Williamson	3:27
8.	"Last Night a Love Song"	Williamson	2:49
9.	"Tropical Fever"	Williamson	3:59
10.	"Fool to Love You"	Williamson	2:04
11.	"Little Piss Piddle"	Williamson	1:58
12.	"Tony M' Mate"	Williamson	2:13
13.	"Christmas Waltz"	Williamson	3:14
14.	"At Lightning Ridge"	Williamson	3:16
15.	"Pickin' On Murray"	Williamson, Maurene Taylor	2:12
16.	"My Oath to Australia"	Williamson	2:58

== Charts ==
Weekly chart performance for Mulga to Mangoes
Chart (1994)	Peak position
Australian Albums (ARIA)	14

=== Year-end charts ===
1994 year-end chart performance for Mulga to Mangoes
Chart (1994)	Position
Australian Albums (ARIA)	78

== Certifications ==
Region	Certification	Certified units/sales
Australia (ARIA)	Gold	35,000^{^}
^{^} Shipments figures based on certification alone.

== Release history ==
Country	Date	Format	Label	Catalogue
Australia	August 1994	CD; Cassette	Gum Leaf, EMI Music	8301732
