= Butcherbird (disambiguation) =

Butcherbirds are magpie-like birds native to Australasia.

Butcherbird may also refer to:

- Butcherbird, a common name for species of shrikes that are known for their "larder" habit of impaling captured prey on thorns, which the unrelated Australian birds share
- Focke-Wulf Fw 190, a German fighter aircraft of World War II nicknamed "Butcher-bird"
- Butcher Bird, a 1993 novel by Dean Ing
- Butcher Bird, a 2007 novel by Richard Kadrey
- Butcherbird (album), a 2018 album by John Williamson
