= Boomerang Café =

Studio album by John Williamson
- Released: April 1988
- Studio: Trafalgar Studios; Sydney, Australia.
- Label: Gumleaf Records, Festival Records
- Producer: John Williamson

John Williamson chronology
Mallee Boy (1986)	Boomerang Café (1988)	Warragul (1989)

Singles from Boomerang Café
- 1. "Crocodile Roll" Released: March 1988; 2. "Boomerang Café" Released: June 1988; 3. "The March for Australia (A New Beginning)" Released: 1988

Boomerang Café is the seventh studio album by Australian country music artist John Williamson. The album was released in April 1988 and peaked at number 10 on the Kent Music Report.

At the inaugural ARIA Music Awards of 1989, the album won Best Country Album.

At the Country Music Awards of Australia in January 1989, Williamson the album won Top Selling Album and Album of the Year.

== Track listing ==
Side A
No.	Title	Writer(s)	Length
1.	"It's A Way Of Life"	John Williamson	3:37
2.	"Old Man Verandah"	Williamson	3:32
3.	"Sail the Nullarbor"	Williamson	3:18
4.	"Westown"	Williamson	3:32
5.	"Welcome All to Broome"	Williamson	4:03
6.	"Crocodile Roll"	Williamson, Tony Dennett	2:46
7.	"The March for Australia (A New Beginning)"	Williamson	3:05

Side B
No.	Title	Writer(s)	Length
1.	"The Boomerang Café"	Williamson	3:30
2.	"The Truckie's Wife"	Williamson	5:05
3.	"My Dad Snores"	Williamson	2:32
4.	"You're a Miner"	Williamson	4:23
5.	"The Only One"	Williamson	3:38
6.	"One More For The Road"	Williamson	2:36

== Charts ==
Chart performance for Boomerang Café
Chart (1988)	Peak position
Australian Albums (Australian Music Report)	10

== Release history ==
Country	Date	Format	Label	Catalogue
Australia	April 1988	Vinyl Record; CD; Cassette	Gum Leaf, Festival Records	RML 53260
