= How Many Songs =

Studio album by John Williamson
- Released: 4 April 2025
- Length: 31:39
- Label: Warner Australia
- Producer: John Williamson

John Williamson chronology
JW Bangers (2022)	How Many Songs (2025)

How Many Songs is the twenty-first studio album by Australian country music artist John Williamson. It was released on 4 April 2025 and peaked at number 51 on the ARIA Albums Chart.

About the album, Williamson said "I've been writing songs inspired by floods, pride of country, getting older and feeling so alive overlooking the Numinbah Valley in South East Queensland."

At the 2026 Country Music Awards of Australia, the album was nominated for Album of the Year and Traditional Country Album of the Year.

== Track listing ==
All tracks are written by John Williamson.

No.	Title	Length
1.	"If You Wanna Be an Aussie"	2:39
2.	"Beautiful Words (Come from You)"	2:45
3.	"Letter to Meg"	2:19
4.	"Sorry, Babe, I'm No Marlon Brando"	2:39
5.	"Come Back to Me, Country"	2:34
6.	"Losin' My Mojo"	2:46
7.	"Uluru Forever"	2:11
8.	"It's a Shame"	2:34
9.	"Dont Let the Old Man In, Mate"	3:24
10.	"Waiting for the Sun" (with Ami Williamson)	2:30
11.	"Boxful of Wood"	2:43
12.	"How Many Songs"	2:30
Total length:		31:39

== Personnel ==
Credits adapted from Tidal.

- John Williamson – vocals, acoustic rhythm guitar, backing vocals, banjo, cymbals, didgeridoo, hand claps, harmonica, harp, nylon-strung guitar, whistle, production
- Jeff McCormack – mastering
- Lindsay Waddington – electric guitar (tracks 1–4, 6–8, 11, 12), acoustic guitar (1, 2, 5, 9, 12), drums (1, 6), baritone guitar (1), backing vocals (5–7, 9), bass (5), banjo (7)
- Gus Fenwick – electric bass (tracks 1, 3, 6, 7, 11), double bass (2, 4, 8–10, 12), backing vocals (9)
- Clare O'Meara – fiddle (tracks 1–4), accordion (4, 8, 10, 11), strings (4), violin (8)
- Michel Rose – pedal steel guitar (tracks 1–3, 10, 12), Dobro (3)
- Doug Gallacher – drums (tracks 3, 7), percussion (7), backing vocals (9)
- Brendan Radford – backing vocals (tracks 5, 10), electric guitar (5), acoustic guitar (10–12)
- Meg Williamson – backing vocals (track 5)
- WEWA Choir – choir vocals (track 6)
- Charli Waddington – choir vocals (track 6)
- Les Forrest – choir vocals (track 6)
- Maddison Waddington – choir vocals (track 6)
- Tyson Colman – choir vocals (track 6)
- Glenn Thomas – organ (track 7)
- Ami Williamson – vocals (track 10)

== Charts ==
Weekly chart performance for How Many Songs
Chart (2018)	Peak position
Australian Albums (ARIA)	51
Australian Country Albums (ARIA)	3

Year-end chart performance for How Many Songs
Chart (2025)	Position
Australian County Albums (ARIA)	87
