= Warragul (album) =

Studio album by John Williamson
- Released: September 1989
- Studio: Trafalgar Studios; Sydney, Australia.
- Length: 51:16
- Label: Gumleaf Records, Festival Records
- Producer: John Williamson

John Williamson chronology
Boomerang Café (1988)	Warragul (1989)	JW's Family Album (1990)

Singles from Warragul
- 1. "Station Cook" Released: January 1989; 2. "Rip Rip Woodchip" Released: July 1989; 3. "Boogie With M' Baby" Released: 28 August 1989; 4. "Special Girl" Released: December 1989

Warragul is the eighth studio album by Australian country music artist John Williamson. The album was released in September 1989 and peaked at number 1 on the ARIA Charts; becoming Williamson's first number 1 album.

At the ARIA Music Awards of 1990, the album won Best Country Album. It was also nominated for Best Adult Contemporary Album.

At the Country Music Awards of Australia in January 1990, Williamson the album won Top Selling Album and Album of the Year.

== Track listing ==
No.	Title	Writer(s)	Length
1.	"Dingo"	John Williamson	3:22
2.	"Why They Call Him Sundown"	Williamson	4:03
3.	"Station Cook"	Williamson	2:43
4.	"Drover's Boy"	Ted Egan	3:37
5.	"Ancient Mountains" (with Gondwanaland)	Williamson	4:32
6.	"Charters Towers"	Williamson	2:50
7.	"Boogie With M'Baby"	Williamson	5:24
8.	"Special Girl"	Williamson	2:41
9.	"40 Years Ago"	Williamson	3:33
10.	"Amazing Day"	Williamson	3:12
11.	"Longreach is Praying"	Williamson	3:11
12.	"Bill the Cat"	Williamson	3:36
13.	"Big Bad Bushranger"	Bob Brown	2:39
14.	"Rip Rip Woodchip"	Williamson	3:02
15.	"Shelter"	Eric Bogle	2:51

== Charts ==
=== Weekly charts ===
Chart (1989/90)	Peak position
Australian Albums (ARIA)	1

=== Year-end charts ===
Chart (1989)	Position
ARIA Albums Chart	34
ARIA Australian Artist Albums Chart	7

== Certifications ==
Region	Certification	Certified units/sales
Australia (ARIA)	2× Platinum	140,000^{^}
^{^} Shipments figures based on certification alone.

== Release history ==
Country	Date	Format	Label	Catalogue
Australia	September 1989	Vinyl Record; CD; Cassette	Gum Leaf, Festival Records	RML 53308

== See also ==
- List of number-one albums in Australia during the 1980s
