= Honest People =

Studio album by John Williamson
- Released: 25 July 2014
- Length: 38:51
- Label: Warner Music Australia
- Producer: John Williamson, Matt Fell

John Williamson chronology
Hell of a Career (2013)	Honest People (2014)	Diggers of the Anzac (2015)

Singles from Honest People
- 1. "Grandpa's Cricket" Released: 3 January 2014; 2. "Honest People" Released: 4 July 2014; 3. "Clouds Over Tamworth" Released: 30 September 2014

Honest People is the nineteenth studio album (fiftieth album in total with live and compilation albums) by Australian country music artist John Williamson. It was released in July 2014 and peaked at number 11 on the ARIA Charts.

== Track listing ==
No.	Title	Length
1.	"Heatwave"	3:55
2.	"Keep Walking"	3:55
3.	"Song for Luke and Mel"	3:45
4.	"What You Wish for"	2:58
5.	"Will She Marry Me"	2:59
6.	"Call Me Blue"	2:22
7.	"Interval"	1:38
8.	"It's All About Love" (with Beccy Cole)	3:21
9.	"Grandpa's Cricket"	2:55
10.	"Kings and Queens"	2:05
11.	"Girt By Sea"	2:55
12.	"Honest People"	3:15
13.	"Clouds Over Tamworth"	2:53

== Charts ==
=== Weekly charts ===
Chart (2014)	Peak position
Australian Albums (ARIA)	11

=== Year-end charts ===
Chart (2014)	Position
ARIA Australian Artist Albums Chart	49
ARIA Country Albums Chart	9
Chart (2015)	Position
ARIA Country Albums Chart	61

== Release history ==
Country	Date	Format	Label	Catalogue
Australia	25 July 2014	CD; DD	Warner Music Australia	5419624992
