= Road Thru the Heart =

Studio album by John Williamson
- Released: 1985
- Recorded: February 1985
- Studio: Trafalgar Studios; Sydney, Australia.
- Label: Gumleaf Records, Festival Records
- Producer: John Williamson

John Williamson chronology
Humble Beginnings (1985)	Road Thru the Heart (1985)	All the Best (1986)

Singles from Road Thru the Heart
- 1. "Go to Nashville" Released: April 1985; 2. "You and My Guitar" Released: August 1985

Road Thru the Heart is the fifth studio album by the Australian country music artist John Williamson. It was released in 1985 and was inspired by Williamson's travels around the evocative Australian outback.

At the Country Music Awards of Australia in July 1986, Williamson won his first Album of the Year award for Road Thru the Heart. He also won the Male Vocalist of the Year award for the single "You and My Guitar".

== Track listing ==
Side A
No.	Title	Writer(s)	Length
1.	"The Dusty Road We Know"	John Williamson	3:55
2.	"Old Lou"	Williamson	3:02
3.	"Go to Nashville"	Williamson	3:10
4.	"The Shed"	Williamson, Tony Dennett	2:37
5.	"You and My Guitar"	Williamson	2:45
6.	"The Least I Can Do (Song for Ethiopia)"	Williamson	2:53
7.	"I Had a Dream"	Williamson	2:00

Side B
No.	Title	Writer(s)	Length
1.	"Someday an Eagle"	Williamson	2:43
2.	"See You Next Year, Mate"	Williamson	3:22
3.	"Alice Springs"	Williamson	2:47
4.	"Coober Pedy"	Williamson	4:45
5.	"Stan Coster" (poem)	Williamson	1:29
6.	"Short of a Quid"	Stan Coster	2:02
7.	"Goodbye Again"	Williamson	2:15

== Release history ==
Country	Date	Format	Label	Catalogue
Australia	1985	Vinyl Record; CD; Cassette	Gum Leaf, Festival Records	L38498
Australia	October 1992	CD	EMI Music	8140052
