= Chandelier of Stars =

Studio album by John Williamson
- Released: August 2005
- Studio: ENREC Studios, Tamworth, New South Wales Australia
- Length: 38:32
- Label: GumLeaf, EMI Music
- Producer: John Williamson

John Williamson chronology
From Bulldust to Bitumen: 20 Queensland Songs (2005)	Chandelier of Stars (2005)	We Love This Country (2005)

Singles from Chandelier of Stars
- 1. "Chandelier of Stars" Released: 2005; 2. "A Country Balladeer" Released: 2005; 3. "Flower on the Water" Released: 2005

Chandelier of Stars is the sixteenth studio album by Australian country music artist John Williamson. It was released in August 2005 and peaked at number 11 on the ARIA Charts. The album was certified gold in 2005.

At the Country Music Awards of Australia in January 2006 Williamson won 'Top Selling Album of the Year' and 'Top Selling Album of the Year' for Chandelier of Stars.

== Track listing ==
No.	Title	Writer(s)	Length
1.	"Little Girl from the Dryland"	John Williamson	3:55
2.	"Chandelier of Stars"	Williamson	3:14
3.	"Bells in a Bushman's Ear"	Williamson	2:42
4.	"Cowboys and Indians"	Williamson	3:18
5.	"Skinny Dingoes"	Williamson	3:12
6.	"The Camel Boy"	Williamson	2:50
7.	"Keeper of the Stones"	Williamson	3:44
8.	"Desert Child" (with Warren H. Williams)	Williamson, Warren H. Williams	3:11
9.	"Renner Spring"	Williamson	3:43
10.	"A Country Balladeer" (with Chad Morgan)	Williamson	2:35
11.	"Firestorm"	Williamson	2:46
12.	"Flower on the Water"	Williamson	3:13
13.	"We Love This Country" (2007 re-release only)	Williamson

DVD
No.	Title	Writer(s)	Length
1.	"Chandelier of Stars"	John Williamson
2.	"Renner Springs"	Williamson
3.	"Desert Child" (with Warren H Williams)	Williamson, Williams
4.	"Skinny Dingoes"	Williamson
5.	"Little Girl from the Dryland"	Williamson
6.	"Bells in a Bushman's Ear"	Williamson
7.	"A Country Balladeer" (with Chad Morgan)	Williamson
8.	"We Love This Country (The Caravan and Campers' song)" ([audio])	Williamson
9.	"Wrinkles" ([audio] with John Stephan)	Williamson
Total length:			25:00

== Charts ==
=== Weekly charts ===
Chart (2005)	Peak position
Australian Albums (ARIA)	11
ARIA Country Albums (ARIA)	1

=== Year-end charts ===
Chart (2005)	Position
ARIA Country Albums (ARIA)	4
Chart (2006)	Position
ARIA Country Albums (ARIA)	22

== Certifications ==
Region	Certification	Certified units/sales
Australia (ARIA)	Gold	35,000^{^}
^{^} Shipments figures based on certification alone.

== Release history ==
Country	Date	Format	Label	Catalogue
Australia	August 2005	CD/DVD; DD	Gumleaf, EMI Music	3119942
Australia	16 August 2007	CD/DVD	EMI Music	3336712
