= Mallee Boy =

Studio album by John Williamson
- Released: November 1986
- Studio: Trafalgar Studios; Sydney, Australia.
- Label: Gumleaf Records, Festival Records
- Producer: John Williamson

John Williamson chronology
| All the Best (1986) | Mallee Boy (1986) | Boomerang Café (1988) |

Singles from Mallee Boy
- 1. "True Blue" Released: September 1986; 2. "Raining on the Rock" Released: January 1987; 3. "Cootamundra Wattle" Released: April 1987

Mallee Boy is the sixth studio album by Australian country music artist John Williamson. The album was released in November 1986 and peaked at number 9 on the Kent Music Report; becoming Williamson's first top ten album.

At the inaugural ARIA Music Awards of 1987, the album won Best Country Album. At the 1987 Country Music Association of Australia, the album won Album of the Year. At the 1988 awards, the album won Top Selling Album.

== Reception and legacy ==
In 2014, Chris Johnston from Sydney Morning Herald said "The best John Williamson songs on his best album Mallee Boy are among the finest representations of (and romances with) Australia in our culture." adding "Mallee Boy's wonderful "Galleries of Pink Galahs", "Raining on the Rock", "True Blue" and "Cootamundra Wattle" are superb, poignant songs about the beauties and paradoxes of this country.".

== Track listing ==
Side A
| No. | Title | Writer(s) | Length |
|---|---|---|---|
| 1. | "Mallee Boy" | John Williamson | 3:18 |
| 2. | "Galleries Of Pink Galahs" | Williamson | 3:59 |
| 3. | "Back at the Isa" | Williamson | 2:18 |
| 4. | "Raining on the Rock" | Williamson | 4:27 |
| 5. | "Three Rivers Hotel" | Stan Coster | 3:26 |
| 6. | "Cracker Night" | Williamson, Tony Dennett | 2:55 |
| 7. | "True Blue" | Williamson | 4:00 |

Side B
| No. | Title | Writer(s) | Length |
|---|---|---|---|
| 1. | "Humpin' My Bluey" | Williamson | 3:03 |
| 2. | "The Budgie Song" | Williamson | 2:36 |
| 3. | "I'm in the Mood" | Williamson | 2:55 |
| 4. | "Cootamundra Wattle" | Williamson | 3:48 |
| 5. | "Paint Me a Wheelbarrow" | Williamson | 2:40 |
| 6. | "Diamantina Drover" | Hugh McDonald | 2:58 |
| 7. | "Show Me a Better Way" | Williamson | 3:24 |

== Chart positions ==
=== Weekly charts ===
| Chart (1986/87) | Peak position |
|---|---|
| Australian Kent Music Report Albums Chart | 9 |

=== Year-end charts ===
| Chart (1987) | Position |
|---|---|
| Australian Kent Music Report Albums Chart | 24 |

== Release history ==
| Country | Date | Format | Label | Catalogue |
|---|---|---|---|---|
| Australia | November 1986 | Vinyl Record; CD; Cassette | Gum Leaf, Festival Records | RML 53221 |
