= Love Is a Good Woman =

Compilation album by John Williamson
- Released: November 1993
- Length: 60:30
- Label: EMI Music
- Producer: John Williamson

John Williamson chronology
Australia Calling – All the Best Vol 2 (1992)	Love Is a Good Woman (1993)	Mulga to Mangoes (1994)

Singles from Love Is a Good Woman
- 1. "Good Woman" Released: November 1993

Love Is a Good Woman is a compilation album by Australian country music artist John Williamson. The album in a compilation of Williamson's love songs. The album included two new tracks; "Good Woman" and "Misty Blue".

At the ARIA Music Awards of 1994, the album was nominated for Best Country Album.

== Track listing ==
No.	Title	Writer(s)	Length
1.	"Good Woman"	John Williamson	2:26
2.	"Misty Blue"	Williamson	2:44
3.	"Millions of Women"	Williamson	3:10
4.	"The Truckie's Wife"	Williamson	5:05
5.	"Leave the Lights On"	Williamson	3:34
6.	"Kill The Night"	Williamson	4:12
7.	"Why Don't We Separate & Be Lovers"	Williamson	2:37
8.	"The Only One"	Williamson	3:38
9.	"Fair Dinkum"	Williamson	3:11
10.	"Love of a True Blue Woman"	Williamson	3:37
11.	"The Dusty Road We Know"	Williamson	3:55
12.	"Heaven's Right Here"	Williamson	2:46
13.	"Goodbye Again"	Williamson	2:15
14.	"Your Body Feels Like Heaven To Me"	Williamson	2:50
15.	"I Still Cry"	Williamson	3:40
16.	"Special Girl"	Williamson	2:41
17.	"Tubbo Station"	Williamson	4:31
18.	"Wintergreen"	Williamson	3:38

== Charts ==
Chart (1993)	Peak position
Australian Albums (ARIA)	123

== Release history ==
Country	Date	Format	Label	Catalogue
Australia	November 1993	CD; Cassette	EMI Music	8279112
