= Quambatook =

Quambatook Victoria
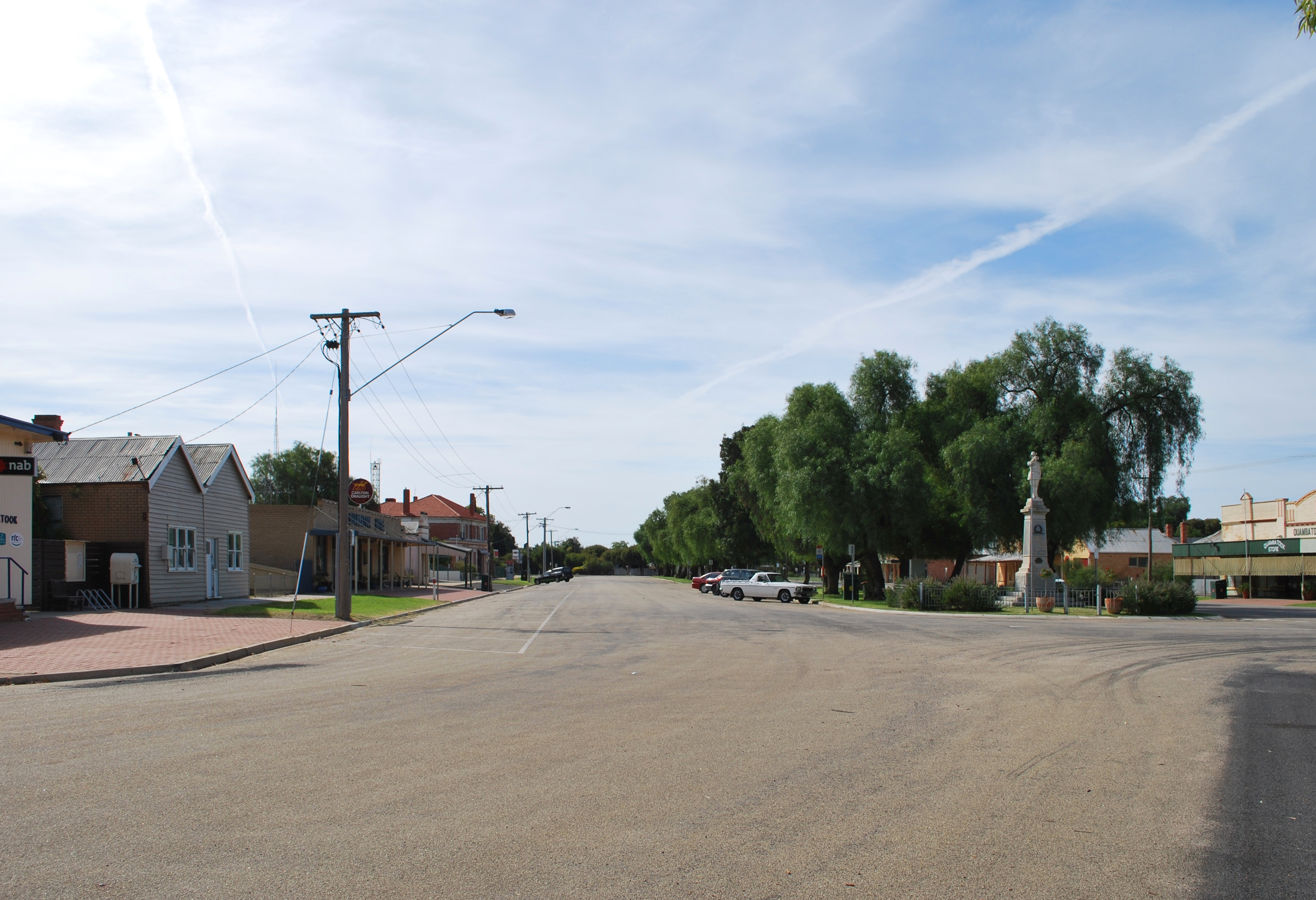
- Guthrie St, the main street of Quambatook

- Coordinates: 35°51′0″S 143°32′0″E
- Population: 229 (2021 census)
- Postcode(s): 3540
- Location: 302 km (188 mi) NW of Melbourne; 162 km (101 mi) NW of Bendigo; 60 km (37 mi) S of Swan Hill
- LGA(s): Shire of Gannawarra
- State electorate(s): Murray Plains
- Federal division(s): Mallee

Quambatook /ˈkwɒmbətʊk/ is a town in the Shire of Gannawarra, Victoria, Australia, 302 kilometres (188 mi) from the state capital, Melbourne. Quambatook is located on the Avoca River. At the 2021 census, Quambatook had a population of 229, a decline from 249 at the 2016 census.

== History ==
Quambatook was settled following the end of the Victorian gold rush of the 1850s. Resumption of large squatter's land holdings for closer settlement in the 1870s led to Quambatook becoming one of Victoria's leading wheat and sheep producing areas. Quambatook Post Office opened on 1 September 1879.

Quambatook has been recognised as the tractor pulling capital of Australia with an annual competition, the Australian Tractor Pulling Championships, held at Easter since 1976. In fact, the town's motto is 'Land of wheat and wool, home of the tractor pull'. The town is where country music performer John Williamson grew up. Williamson has written a musical named for the town.

Golfers play at the course of the Quambatook Golf Club on Boort Road.

The primary school closed in 2017 after no applications to teach the six remaining students were received.

After over a century, Quambatook Football Club was dissolved following the 2022 season of the Golden Rivers Football League.

== Gallery ==
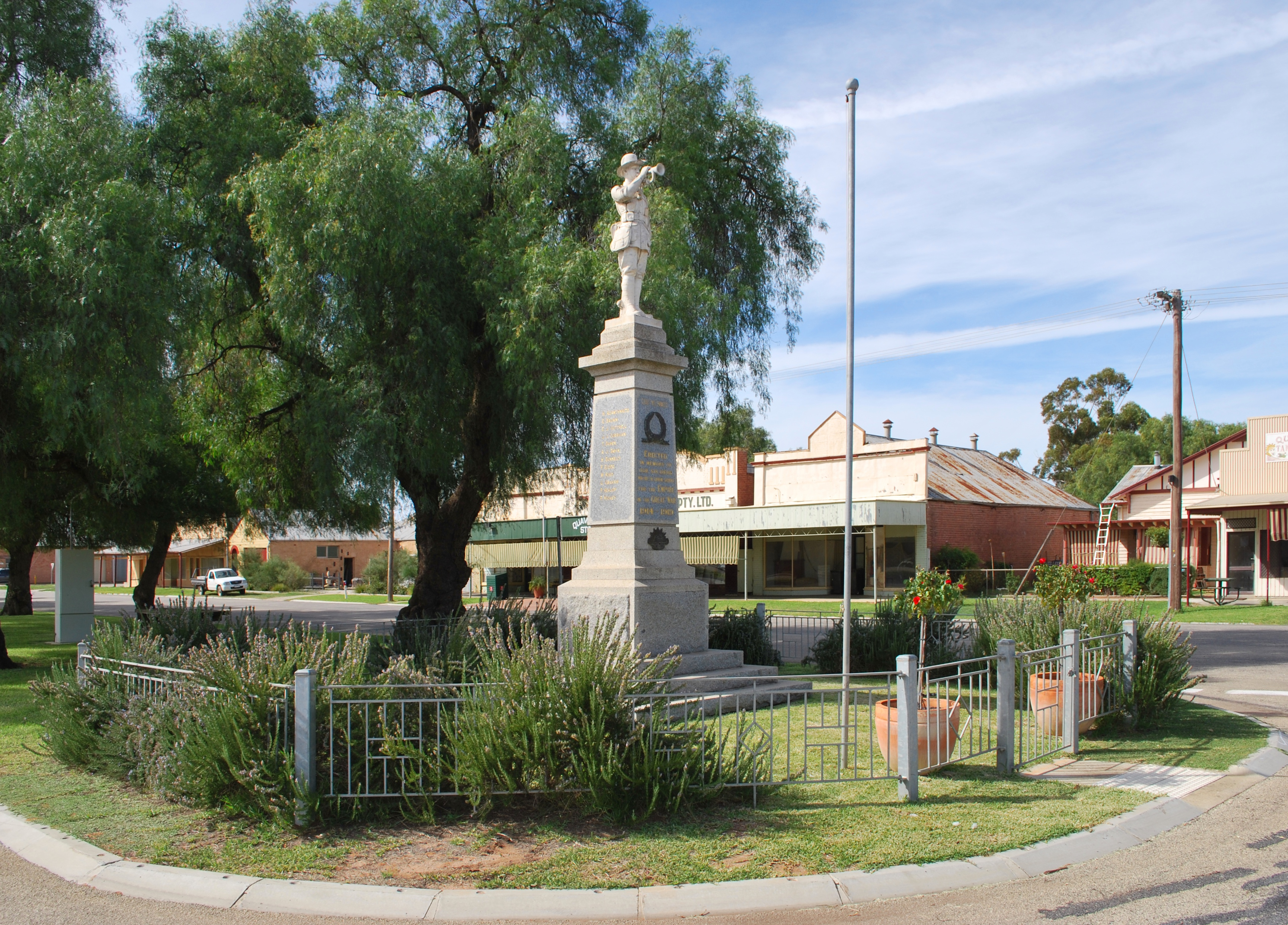
War memorial

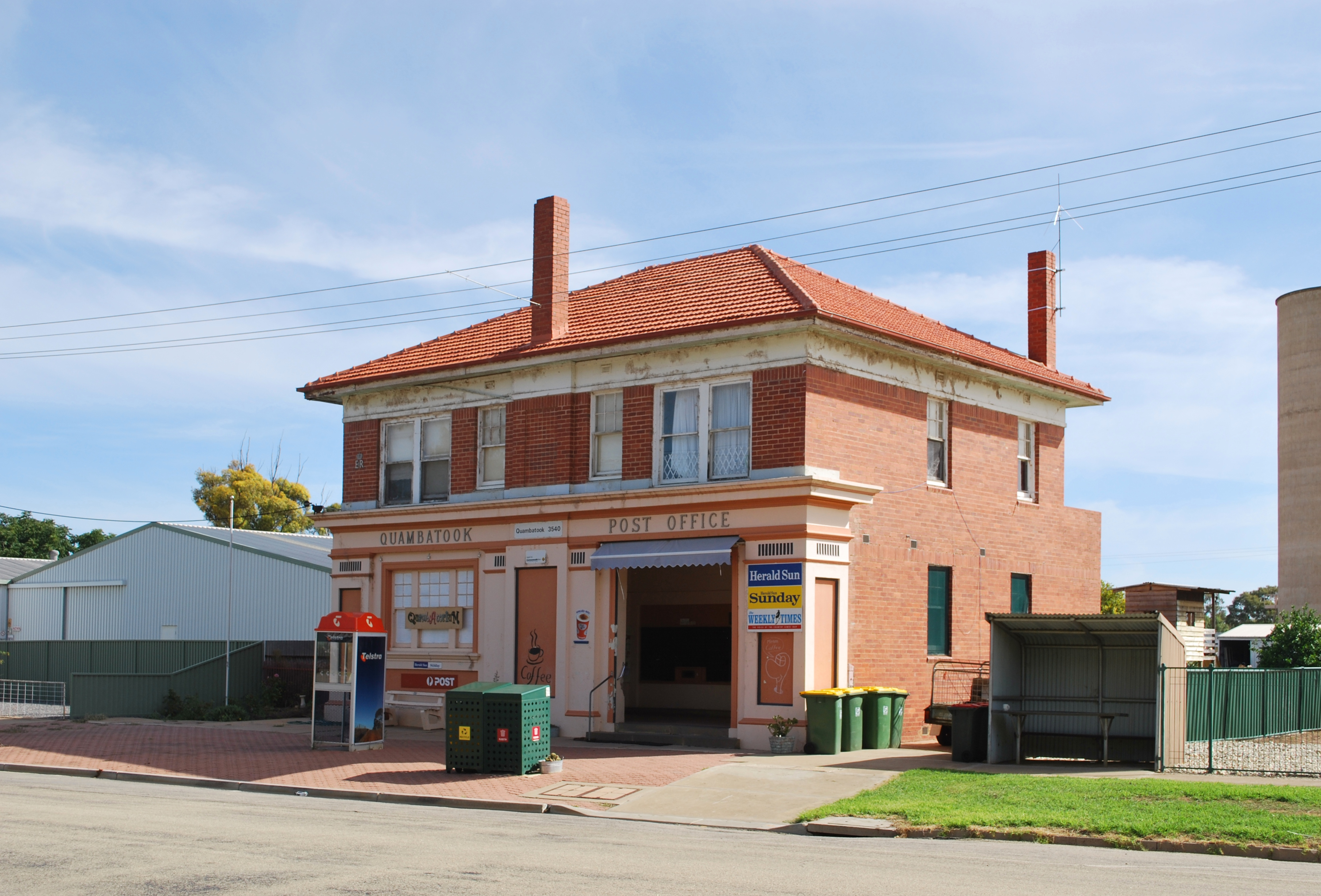
Post office

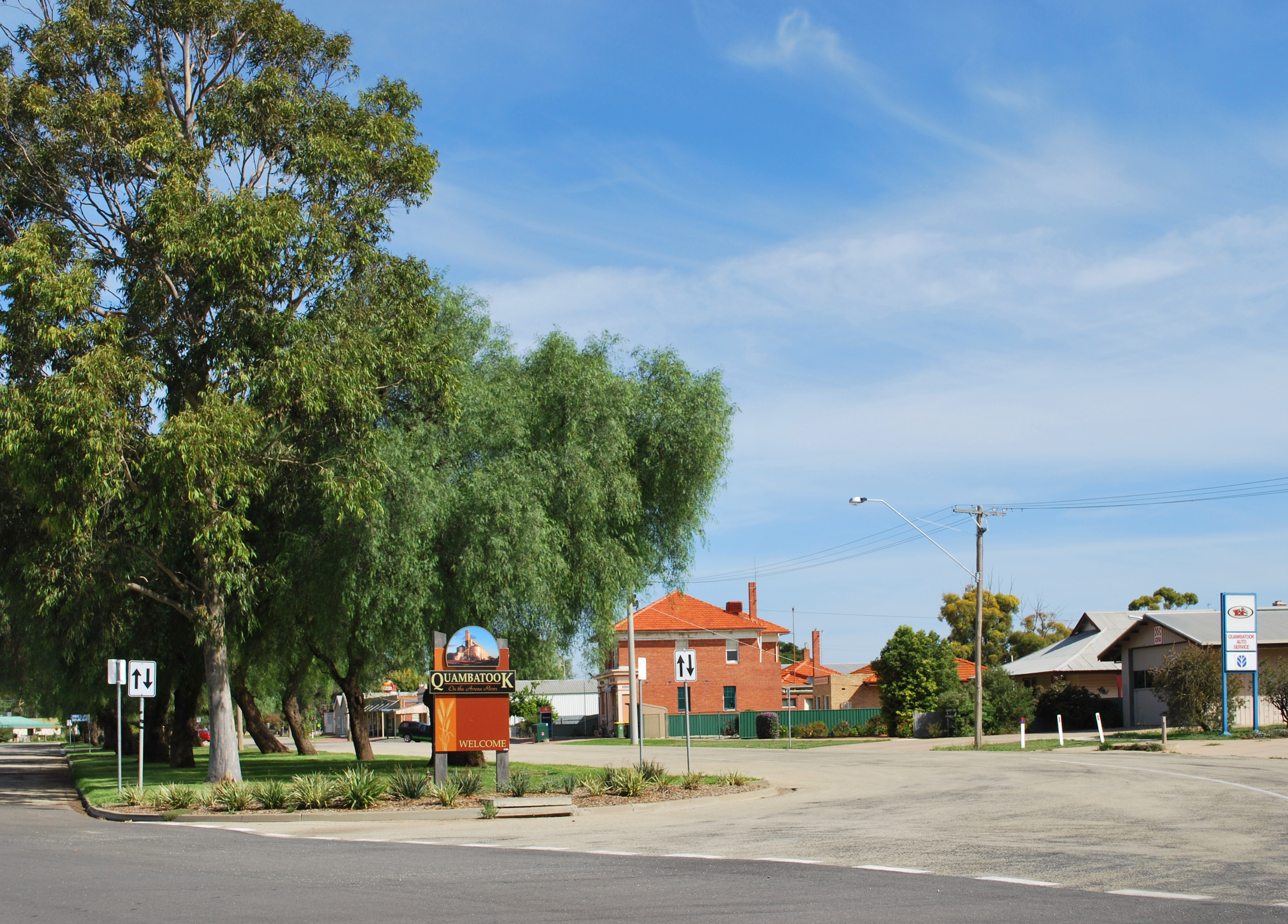
Guthrie St

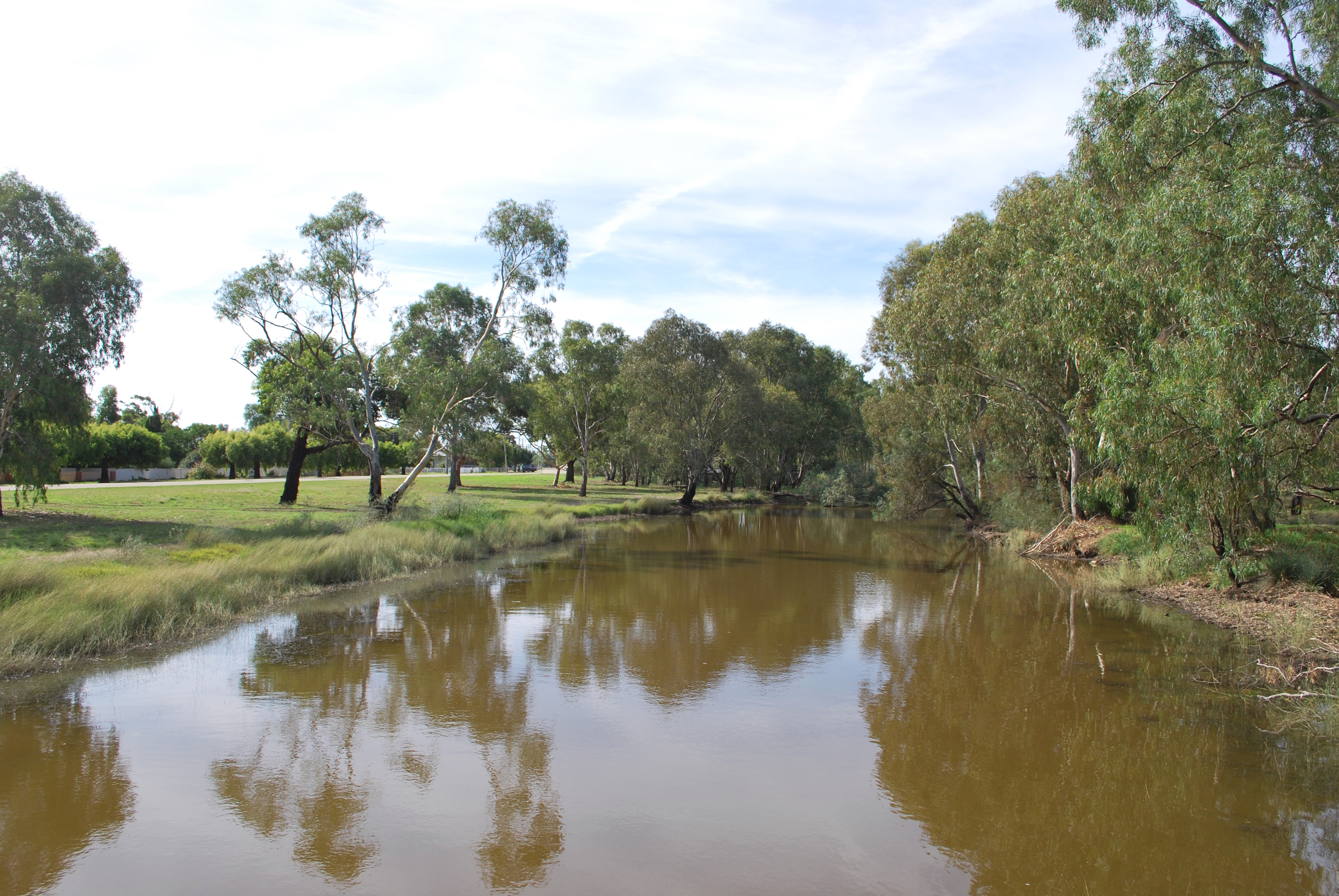
Avoca River and River St

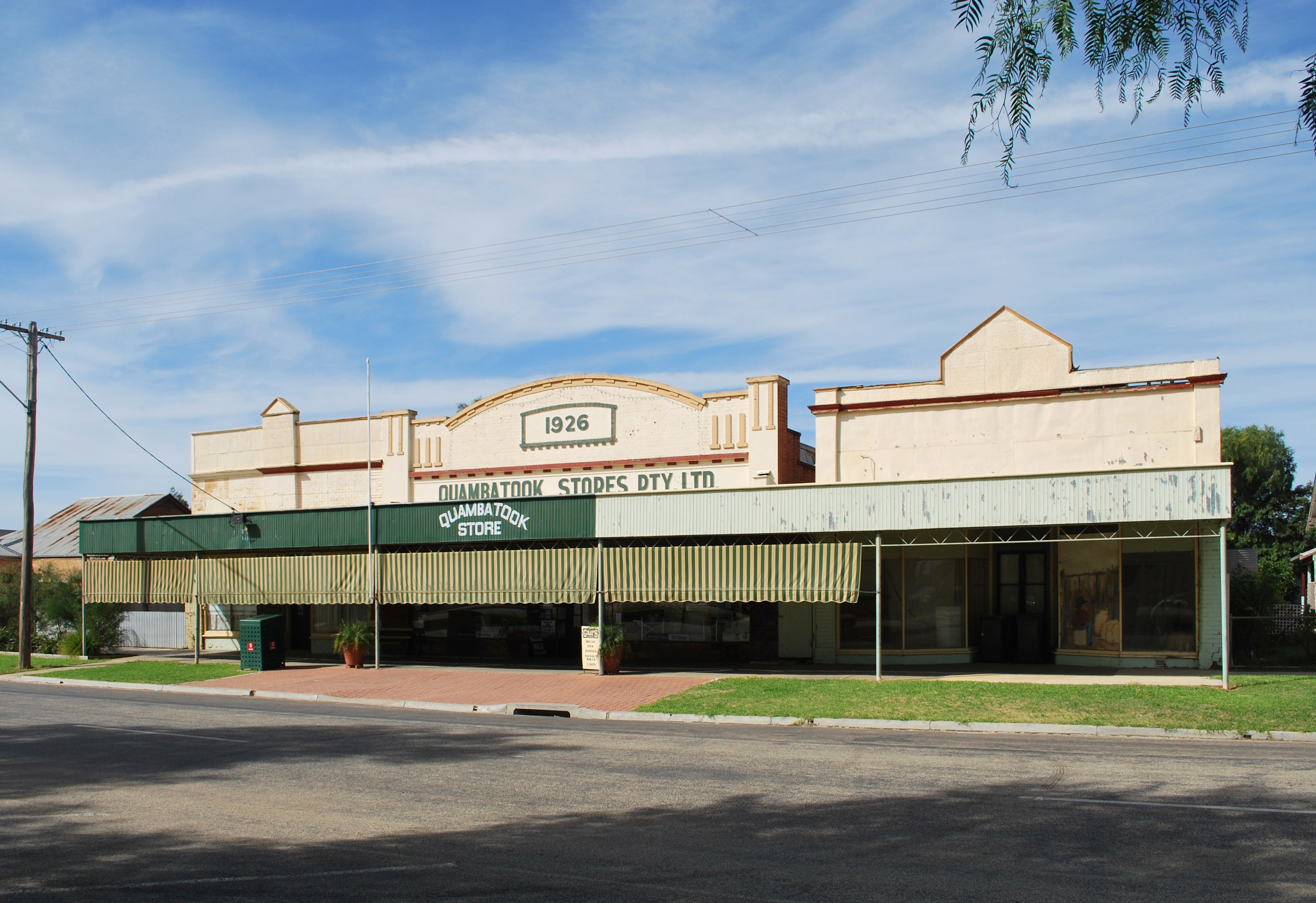
General store

== See also ==
- Quambatook (musical)
