= Butcherbird (album) =

Studio album by John Williamson
- Released: 24 August 2018
- Studio: Love Hz
- Genre: Country
- Length: 30:48
- Label: Warner Australia
- Producers: Matt Fell; John Williamson

John Williamson chronology
His Favourite Collection (2016)	Butcherbird (2018)

Singles from Butcherbird
- 1. "Pigs on the River" Released: 20 October 2017; 2. "The Valley of His Dreams" Released: 24 August 2018

Butcherbird is the twentieth studio album by Australian country music artist John Williamson. It was released on 24 August 2018 and peaked at number 13 on the ARIA Albums Chart.

Topics on the album include life and love, as well as nature—written by Williamson about his bush property in Springbrook, Queensland. Williamson said: "Butcherbird is probably my most relaxed album ever... It's a very honest and reflective album and it was quite a breeze to write. Perhaps because at this stage of my career I had a "what the hell, just do it" attitude. It felt right."

Williamson said the butcherbird is his "favourite feathered singer". He said: "They have been here longer than humans, yet their melodies are remarkably fresh. They are my mates in the garden and have inspired the first track 'The Valley of His Dreams'."

Williamson supported the album with a national tour in October and November 2018.

At the 2019 Country Music Awards of Australia, Butcherbird was nominated for Traditional Country Album of the Year.

== Reception ==
Professional ratings
Review scores
Source	Rating
The AU Review	3.5/5 stars

Dylan Marshall from The AU Review said that while Butcherbird "might not have all that many 'instant' classics, it's still a jolly good jaunt", adding: "His connection with the land and its people, as well as those who built the nation's formative identity, are what makes Williamson a national treasure. Butcherbird isn't ground breaking, but I don't think it needs to be. It's an honest album, and frankly, I'm fine with that."

== Track listing ==
All tracks are written by John Williamson.

No.	Title	Length
1.	"The Valley of His Dreams/It Doesn't Get Better Than This"	6:21
2.	"Pigs on the River"	3:41
3.	"Looking for a Story"	2:28
4.	"Buddy and Slim"	2:58
5.	"Simpson Desert"	2:38
6.	"Please Don't Forget Me"	2:22
7.	"Lucky to Be Alive"	2:18
8.	"You Don't Love You Love Anymore"	2:44
9.	"Time Is Slippin' Away"	3:08
10.	"When My Horse Came In"	2:06
Total length:		30:48

== Personnel ==
Credits adapted from the album's liner notes.

- John Williamson – lead vocals, backing vocals, ukulele, jaw harp, harmonica, production, cover artwork
- Matt Fell – bass, mandolele, drums, percussion, keyboards, banjo, backing vocals, production, engineering, mixing
- Colin Watson – electric guitar
- Clare O'Meara – violin, backing vocals
- Josh Schuberth – drums, percussion
- Meg Williamson – backing vocals
- Ami Williamson – backing vocals
- Glenn Hannah – guitar on "Pigs on the River"
- William Bowden – mastering
- Anna Warr – photography
- Dave Homer – graphic design

== Charts ==
=== Weekly charts ===
Chart (2018)	Peak position
Australian Albums (ARIA)	13

=== Year-end charts ===
Chart (2018)	Peak position
Australian Country Albums (ARIA)	28

== Release history ==
Country	Date	Format	Label	Catalogue
Australia	24 August 2018	CD; DD; streaming	Warner Music Australia	5419702417
