= Gunyah (album) =

Studio album by John Williamson
- Released: 22 April 2002
- Studio: ENREC Studios, Tamworth, New South Wales Australia
- Length: 44:44
- Label: Gumleaf Records, EMI Music
- Producer: John Williamson

John Williamson chronology
Anthems (2000)	Gunyah (2002)	True Blue Two (2003)

Singles from Gunyah
- 1. "Sing You the Outback" Released: January 2002; 2. "Buried in Her Bedclothes" Released: May 2002

Gunyah is the fifteenth studio album by Australian country music artist John Williamson. The album was released in April 2002, peaked at number 20 on the ARIA Charts, and was certified gold.

The word "Gunyah" is an Australian Aboriginal word, meaning "small and temporary shelter".

== Track listing ==
No.	Title	Writer(s)	Length
1.	"Sing You the Outback"	John Williamson	3:37
2.	"Frangipani Bay"	Williamson	3:02
3.	"Cape York Peninsula"	Williamson	3:04
4.	"Granny's Little Gunyah"	Williamson	2:58
5.	"Butter Outta Grass"	Williamson	3:46
6.	"A Mighty Big River"	Williamson	3:00
7.	"Around Jindabyne"	Williamson	3:33
8.	"The Devil's Boots"	Williamson	3:12
9.	"Salisbury Street"	Williamson	3:35
10.	"You Are My Foundation"	Williamson	3:05
11.	"Buried In Her Bedclothes"	Williamson	2:43
12.	"The Kiwi and the Emu"	Williamson	2:37
13.	"Telephone in My Pocket"	Williamson	3:38
14.	"Big Brother, Little Brother" (bonus track)	Williamson	2:44

== Charts ==
=== Weekly charts ===
Chart (2002)	Peak position
Australian Albums (ARIA)	20
New Zealand Albums (RMNZ)	44

=== Year-end charts ===
Chart (2002)	Position
ARIA Country Albums Chart	6

== Certifications ==
Region	Certification	Certified units/sales
Australia (ARIA)	Gold	35,000^{^}
^{^} Shipments figures based on certification alone.

== Release history ==
Country	Date	Format	Label	Catalogue
Australia	22 April 2002	CD	Gum Leaf, EMI Music	53917227
Australia	2005	Digital download	EMI Music	
Australia	2 August 2013	CD	Warner Music Australia	5310583882
