= Brendan Radford =

Brendan Radford (fl. 2000s) is a vocalist and guitarist who has performed and recorded with many leading Australian and international artists. He was part of Lee Kernaghan’s touring band for over ten years and has also been in the Country Music Awards of Australia house band for the past six years. Prior to and also during this period he has performed and recorded with other Australian and International artists including Pam Tillis, Gina Jeffreys, Troy Cassar-Daley, Adam Harvey, Sara Storer, Glenn Shorrock, and Russell Morris

Brendan operates his own recording facility Radmusic and has been busy producing musical projects and albums for a number of local and interstate artists.

Over the past two years Brendan has been progressively recording a solo album, made up largely of his own material. The first single, ‘Sweet Maree’ was released to radio in March 2009.

"Snow" is the second single release and title track from Brendan's first solo effort. The album features 12 tracks and includes a number of other songs written by Brendan, along with interesting reworks of a few obscure classics. The album also contains two instrumental tracks. Brendan produced all tracks, features on vocals, guitars, harmonica and mandolin, and is joined by some of Australia's premier musicians, including James Gillard, Mitch Farmer, Jake Lardot, Hugh Curtis, Vaughan Jones, Michel Rose, Mick Albeck, Rose Carleo and a duet with Casey Watt.

== Discography ==
=== Albums ===
List of albums, with selected details
Title	Details
Snow	Released: November 2009; Label: Checked Label Services; Format: CD
Start All Over Again	Released: September 2025; Label: Brendan Radford; Format: CD, digital

== Awards ==
=== Country Music Awards of Australia ===
The Country Music Awards of Australia (CMAA) (also known as the Golden Guitar Awards) is an annual awards night held in January during the Tamworth Country Music Festival, in Tamworth, New South Wales, celebrating recording excellence in the Australian country music industry.

Year	Nominee / work	Award	Result (wins only)
2026	Start All Over Again	Traditional Country Album of the Year	Won
