= Amos Morris =

- Born: Australia
- Genre: Country
- Occupation: Balladeer
- Years active: 2005–present

Amos Morris (born 1987/1988) is an Indigenous Australian country music bush balladeer from Kempsey, New South Wales. He won a Golden Guitar Award in 2008 for Bush Ballad of the Year, becoming the youngest ever winner of the category. He has performed with John Williamson and Warren H Williams in the song "Australia is Another Word for Free" which won a Golden Guitar Award for Bush Ballad of the Year in 2009.

== Discography ==
- Memories Live On (2005) - One Stop Entertainment
- Sign of the Times (2007) - Nulla Records
- Life Goes On (2010)
- "By Request" (2012)

== Awards ==
=== Country Music Awards of Australia ===
The Country Music Awards of Australia (CMAA) (also known as the Golden Guitar Awards) is an annual awards night held in January during the Tamworth Country Music Festival, celebrating recording excellence in the Australian country music industry. They have been held annually since 1973.

Year	Nominee / work	Award	Result
2008	"Sign of the Times" by Amos Morris	Bush Ballad of the Year	Won
2009	"Australia Is Another Word for Free" by John Williamson, Warren H Williams & Amos Morris	Bush Ballad of the Year	Won

- Note: wins only
