= John Williamson (album) =

Studio album by John Williamson
- Released: 1970
- Recorded: 1970
- Studio: Bill Armstrong Studios; Melbourne, Australia.
- Label: Fable Records
- Producer: June Productions of Australia Pty. Ltd.

John Williamson chronology
John Williamson (1970)	Old Man Emu (EP) (1973)

Singles from John Williamson
- 1. "Old Man Emu" Released: May 1970; 2. "Under the Bridge"/"Unexplored Shadow of Mine" Released: November 1970; 3. "Beautiful Sydney"/"Melbourne Blue, Melbourne Green" Released: February 1971

John Williamson is the debut studio album by Australian country music artist John Williamson. It was released in 1970.

== Background and release ==
In 1970, Williamson entered New Faces, an Australian talent show, with the self-penned track "Old Man Emu". Williamson won the contest and signed with the newly formed label Fable Records. "Old Man Emu" was released in May 1970 which peaked at number 4 on the Kent Music Report and was certified gold in Australia Williamson wrote and recorded his debut studio which was released in mid-1970 but failed to chart. It was the first album released by the label.

== Track listing ==
Side A
No.	Title	Writer(s)	Length
1.	"Old Man Emu"	John Williamson	2:50
2.	"Melbourne Blue - Melbourne Green"	Williamson	2:05
3.	"The Pitt Street Farmer"	Williamson	2:04
4.	"The Morning After"	Williamson	2:07
5.	"Susan-Gaye"	Williamson	3:00
6.	"Autumn of Our Love"	Williamson	3:00
7.	"Little Babies"	Williamson	2:13

Side B
No.	Title	Writer(s)	Length
1.	"Under the Bridge"	Williamson	3:29
2.	"Beautiful Sydney"	Williamson	3:21
3.	"Should I Tell Her"	Williamson	3:10
4.	"W-W-Wallaby"	Williamson	1:44
5.	"The Unexplored Shadows of Mine"	Williamson	2:49
6.	"Through an Eagle's Eye"	Williamson	2:48

== Release history ==
Country	Date	Format	Label	Catalogue
Australia	mid 1970	Vinyl Record	Fable Records	FBSA-001
