= The Drover's Boy =

Song performed by John Williamson

"The Drover's Boy" is a song by Ted Egan.

Songs on the album (all composed by Ted Egan):

Song title	Performer(s)
1. The Drover's Boy	Ted Egan
2. A Bunch of Damned Whores	Nerys Evans, Margret Roadknight, Geraldine Doyle, Margot Moir
3. Mary Broad	Nerys Evans
4. God's Police	Ted Egan
5. Truganini	Nerys Evans
6. Kitty Buchanan	Nerys Evans
7. Alyandabu	Ted Egan
8. A Song for Grace	Nerys Evans
9. Bush Woman	Ted Egan
10. The Shearer's Wife	Nerys Evans
11. She's Australian	Ted Egan
12. The Rouseabout	Nerys Evans
13. Granny	Ted Egan
14. Survivors	Ted Egan

== Book ==
Egan wrote a book based on the story of the song; The Drover's Boy. The jacket description reads:

"Based on a song of the same name and set in the 1920s, The Drover's Boy recalls the time when it was illegal for Caucasians and Aborigines to marry, and the death of an Aborigine went unnoticed by the white community. This popular and moving Australian folk song comes from a true story about a Caucasian drover (the Australian name for a cowboy or sheep herder) who is forced to pass off his Aboriginal wife as his "drover's boy". Ted Egan wrote this song as a tribute to the Aboriginal stockwomen, in the hope that one day their enormous contribution to the Australian pastoral industry might be recognized and honored. Ages 11+."

== Compilations and cover versions ==
- Amanda Palmer performed The Drover's Boy on her 2020 Album Forty Five Degrees Bushfire Charity Flash Record.
- Poole, Reg (1980), Women of the west, Selection Records The Drover's Boy (Ted Egan singer) was one track on this compilation album.
- John Williamson performed The Drover's Boy on his 1989 album Warragul. This track won for him the 'Heritage Award' at the Country Music Awards of Australia in 1990.

== Bibliography ==
The Drover's Boy has been collected in:

- Newton, Dobe; Corbett, Roger; Bushwackers (Musical group) (1983), The Second Bushwackers Australian song book, A. O'Donovan, ISBN 978-0-908476-12-1
- Egan, Ted; Forrest, Peter, 1941-; Egan, Ted (1984), The Overlanders songbook, Greenhouse Publications, ISBN 978-0-909104-74-0 (text by Peter Forrest; foreword by Dame Mary Durack; musical notation by Erik Kowarski; cover illustration, Bill Gwydir on the Birdsville Track, by Robert Wettenhall, 1983.)

It has also inspired a series of paintings and a stage production:

- Marchant, Bob; Evans, Nerys; Egan, Ted, 1932-. Drover's boy (1995), "The Drover's Boy" series of paintings, B. Marchant, ISBN 978-0-646-24821-9 Bob Marchant was winner of Sir John Sulman Prize in 1988 and joint winner in 1987.
- The Drover's Boy, Athenaeum Theatre Two, Melbourne, VIC, 29 July 1998 [Event description], 1998

== Movie ==
Egan saw a potential movie in the story of The Drover's Boy and commissioned Cinevest Limited to find potential backers. A prospectus was issued in 1995 The funds raised by Cinevest and Egan personally, after pre-production costs were sufficient to capture extensive footage of outback cattle movements on high quality film, but insufficient to guarantee completion of the full-length movie, so the project was abandoned.

In 2015 a hybrid-documentary based on The Drover's Boy song was released. The short-film, with a run time of 11 minutes, was directed by Margaret McHugh and produced by Lyn Norfor and has been screened at numerous film festivals.
