= Waratah St =

Studio album by John Williamson
- Released: September 1991
- Recorded: April–June 1991
- Studio: Trafalgar Studios; NSW Australia
- Label: Gumleaf Records, Festival Records
- Producer: John Williamson

John Williamson chronology
JW's Family Album (1990)	Waratah St (1991)	Australia Calling – All the Best Vol 2 (1992)

Singles from Waratah St
- 1. "A Flag of Our Own" Released: August 1991; 2. "Waratah Street" Released: October 1991

Waratah St is the tenth studio album by Australian country music artist John Williamson. The album was released in September 1991 and peaked at number 14 on the ARIA Charts. The album was certified platinum.

At the ARIA Music Awards of 1992, the album was nominated for Best Country Album and Best Adult Contemporary Album.

== Track listing ==
No.	Title	Writer(s)	Length
1.	"Songs for My Guitar"	John Williamson	2:58
2.	"Tubbo Station"	Williamson	4:29
3.	"Winter Green"	Williamson	3:36
4.	"Waratah St."	Williamson	3:10
5.	"A Bushman Can't Survive"	Williamson	4:09
6.	"Wobbly Boot Hotel (Boggabilla Pub)"	Stan Coster	2:36
7.	"Goondiwindi Pork"	Williamson	3:25
8.	"Will Our Grandchildren Sing"	Williamson	0.37
9.	"A Flag of Our Own"	Williamson	3:28
10.	"The Big Depression"	Williamson	3:11
11.	"Ami, Take Your Chances!"	Williamson	3:31
12.	"Georgie"	Williamson	3:07
13.	"Beachcomber From Wollongong"	Williamson	2:24
14.	"Millions of Women"	Williamson	3:10
15.	"Papa Whisky November"	Williamson	3:18

== Charts ==
Chart (1991)	Peak position
Australian Albums (ARIA)	14

== Certifications ==
Region	Certification	Certified units/sales
Australia (ARIA)	Platinum	70,000^{^}
^{^} Shipments figures based on certification alone.

== Release history ==
Country	Date	Format	Label	Catalogue
Australia	September 1991	Vinyl Record; CD; Cassette	Gum Leaf, Festival Records	53347
