= John Williamson (singer) =

Australian singer-songwriter (born 1945)

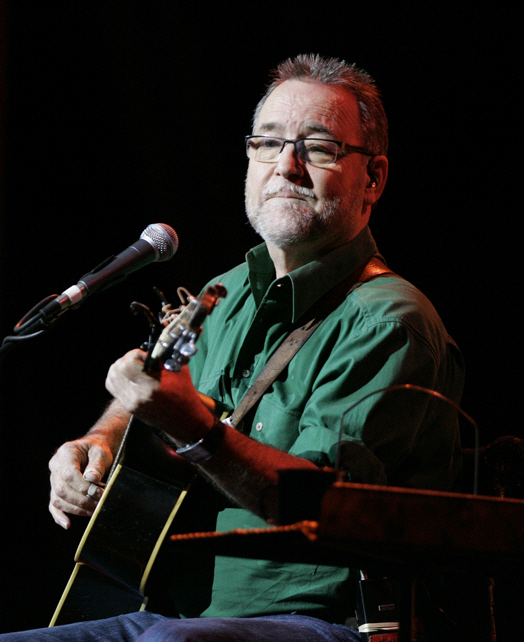
- John Williamson, August 2012, State Theatre, Sydney

Background information
- Also known as: Ludwig Leichhardt
- Born: John Robert Williamson; 1 November 1945 (age 81); Kerang, Victoria, Australia
- Genres: Country and rock
- Occupations: Singer-songwriter; multi-instrumentalist; television presenter; conservationist
- Instruments: Vocals; acoustic guitar; ukulele; harmonica; footbox; jaw harp
- Years active: 1970–present
- Labels: Fable; Reg Grundy; Mercury; Polygram; Festival Records; EMI; Gumleaf; Reader's Digest
- Website: johnwilliamson.com.au

John Robert Williamson AM (born 1 November 1945) is an Australian country music and folk music singer-songwriter, multi-instrumentalist, television host and conservationist. Williamson usually writes and performs songs that relate to the history and culture of Australia, particularly the outback, in a similar vein to Slim Dusty and Buddy Williams before him. Williamson has released over fifty albums, ten videos, five DVDs, and two lyric books and has sold more than 4,000,000 albums in Australia. His best known hit is "True Blue". On Australia Day (26 January) in 1992 Williamson was made a Member of the Order of Australia (AM) with the citation: "for service to Australian country music and in stimulating awareness of conservation issues". Williamson has received 28 Golden Guitar trophies at the Country Music Awards of Australia, he has won three ARIA Music Awards for Best Country Album and, in 2010, was inducted into the related Hall of Fame. Williamson has sold over 5 million records in Australia.

== Early life ==
John Robert Williamson was born on 1 November 1945 at Kerang Bush Nursing Hospital to Keith Williamson and Shirley Ellen (née Manuel). He grew up in Quambatook, in the Mallee district of north-western Victoria. His parents farmed wheat crops on various small land lots in the region and both were amateur performing artists singing in local Gilbert & Sullivan productions. Williamson is the oldest of five sons whose names in order are William, Robin, Peter and Jeff.

== Origins and beginnings ==
Williamson's performance style originates from his 'farmland, not city bitumen' lifestyle, and his upbringing is referred to by the nickname, 'The Mallee Boy'. His early musical influences were Roger Miller and Rolf Harris, both of whom provided inspirational elements for his first hit, namely using a vocal imitation from Miller's "Dang Me" and replacing Rolf's wobble board with a Jaw's Harp. From the age of seven he learned to play the ukulele from his father, before proceeding when he was twelve to guitar and taught himself to play harmonica. For the last four years of secondary schooling Williamson attended Scotch College in Melbourne. In the early 1960s, while still at college, he formed a folk music group. After schooling Williamson returned home to become a farmer and, in 1965, the family moved to Croppa Creek, near Moree, where Williamson began performing at a local restaurant.

== Career ==
=== 1970s ===
In 1969, Williamson wrote a novelty song, "Old Man Emu", and early the following year he performed the track on TV talent quest, New Faces, winning first place. He later reflected on his songwriting process, and the importance of his guitar, "no matter where I go I'll have one with me, in case I come up with a song, I've got to have the guitar straight away. I always write the words and the music together". In early 1970 he signed a recording contract with Fable Records owner and New Faces's judge, Ron Tudor. In May "Old Man Emu" was released as a single on Tudor's label, which peaked at No. 3 on the Go-Set National Top 60. It was awarded a gold certification and was listed at No. 14 on Go-Set's Top Records for the Year of 1970. His self-titled debut album followed in mid-year and, although it featured "Old Man Emu", it had little commercial success: only selling two-thousand copies. Since "Old Man Emu" was his only hit he had to perform it two or three times per gig. Williamson's follow-up single, "Under the Bridge" backed with "The Unexplored Shadows of Mine" was issued in November with certain pressings having its A and B-sides swapped around. By February 1971 the album's third single, "Beautiful Sydney", appeared. A string of non-album singles followed including, in March 1972, "Misery Farm" with Lumpy Pumpkin.

In 1973, Williamson hosted a country music TV series, Travlin' Out West, which ran for two years, broadcast by NBN-3, Newcastle. He performed with two regular acts, Ricky & Tammy, and Emma Hannah. The program provided two albums for the regulars, Travlin' Out West in Concert (1973) and From Travlin' Out West (1974) issued by Reg Grundy Productions. In 1976 he issued his second album, The Comic Strip Cowboy, but it failed to chart. In early 1978, Williamson released his first compilation album under the Country Greats series. This was followed later in the year by his third album, Road to Town, with contributions by other musicians including Tommy Emmanuel on guitar. Also that year Williamson formed a country music band, Crow, which performed on the pub and club circuit across Australia. In 1980 Crow were renamed as Sydney Radio, to play rock music with a reggae influence. The members used face paint, with Williamson disguised as the clown, Ludwig Leichhardt. Williamson penned rock and reggae numbers for the band some of which were recorded but never released. Since 1970 Williamson has had a friendship with radio presenter, John Laws, who calls Williamson his 'little brother'. In 1977, Williamson recorded and released a single, "It's a Grab It While It's Goin' Kind of Life", which is a musical tribute to Laws. Up until Laws' first retirement on 25 June 2007, Williamson wrote and performed a series of jingles for Laws' morning show on 2UE, and his final jingle was "Hey good on ya Lawsie, you pulled the plug at last". Laws made a successful comeback to radio broadcasting in February 2011, this time at 2SM, part of the Super Radio Network, and Williamson's jingles for his programme resumed.

=== 1980s ===
In early 1981 Williamson's rock group, Sydney Radio, disbanded and he began playing solo in pubs, which attracted more new fans. He recorded a tribute song for ANZACs, "Diggers of the ANZAC (This Is Gallipoli)", which was well received and issued as a single. Williamson met Pixie Jenkins, a fiddle player, and the two toured together for several years. In April 1981 Williamson issued a single, "The Breaker", featuring narrated vocals by Charles 'Bud' Tingwell, which was inspired by the movie, Breaker Morant (1980) (which had Tingwell as a supporting actor). "The Breaker" enabled Williamson to cast off the "Old Man Emu" novelty tag and "[h]is long apprenticeship flowed into an apparently endless set of songs charming Australians with stories and images about themselves and their country". In 1982, he recorded a new track, "True Blue", which was included on a compilation album, True Blue: The Best of John Williamson. Later that year, he issued Fair Dinkum J.W., featuring traditional Australian ballads, "With My Swag upon My Shoulder", "Botany Bay" and "Brisbane Ladies"; as well as originals, "Country Football", "Kill the Night", "Wrinkles" and "(You've Gotta Be) Fair Dinkum", a duet with Karen Johns.

In 1983 Williamson released his first solo live album, Singing in the Suburbs and another live album, The Smell of Gum Leaves, in September 1984. It featured another comic track, "I'm Fair Dinkum". Williamson then launched his merchandise business, The Fair Dinkum Road Company, in Sydney. The album included his cover version of Spectrum's 1971 single, "I'll Be Gone", which he played using only guitar and harmonica. At the start of 1985 he founded an independent record label, Gumleaf Recordings. At the Country Music Awards of Australia in January that year, he won 'Song of the Year' for "Queen in the Sport of Kings". He then issued a new compilation, Humble Beginnings, featuring tracks from his first three studio albums. He released another studio album that year, Road Thru the Heart. At the Country Music Awards of Australia in January 1986, he won 'Album of the Year' for Road Thru the Heart and 'Male Vocalist of the Year' for "You and My Guitar". In July 1986, Williamson released another compilation, All the Best! which contained eighteen of his most-requested tracks both from studio and live works. As a bonus, Williamson collaborated with both of his daughters, Ami and Georgie, and with Australian folk group Bullamakanka on "Goodbye Blinky Bill" – highlighting the comic koala character of the same name. When issued as a single, the purchase price included an A$1.00 donation to the Koala Preservation Society in Port Macquarie. At the Country Music Awards of Australia in January 1986, he won 'Album of the Year' for Road Thru the Heart and 'Male Vocalist of the Year' for "You and My Guitar".

In November 1986 Williamson's Gumleaf Recordings distributed his breakthrough album, Mallee Boy, which peaked in the Top 10 on the Kent Music Report Albums Chart. It remained in the top 50 for a year-and-a-half, and was awarded a triple platinum certificate. It was "filled with storytelling that spanned from his own beginnings on that farm in the Victorian Mallee to every corner of the nation". At the ARIA Music Awards of 1987, Mallee Boy was named the inaugural winner of Best Country Album. At the Country Music Awards of Australia in January 1987, he won 'Album of the Year' for Mallee Boy and 'Male Vocalist of the Year' for "True Blue". Popular tracks include the title song, "Galleries of Pink Galahs" (see Galah), "Raining on the Rock" (see Uluru) and "Cootamundra Wattle" (see Acacia baileyana). The album had a re-recorded version of "True Blue" which was released as a single in September. Williamson was asked by the Australian Made Campaign whether they could use "True Blue" for their TV and radio ads. It became a career highlight and was adopted as a theme by the Australia national cricket team. To support Mallee Boy Williamson performed his concerts in a campfire setting and since that time he commences many of his shows with its title track. At the Country Music Awards of Australia in January 1988, he won 'Top Selling Album' for Mallee Boy.

In April 1988 Williamson issued his seventh studio album, Boomerang Café, which peaked at No. 10 on the Kent Music Report. At the ARIA Music Awards of 1989, Boomerang Café won his second award for Best Country Album. At the Country Music Awards of Australia in January 1989, he won 'Top Selling Album' and 'Album of the Year' for Boomerang Café. Despite the title song's lyrics, Williamson has told concert audiences that he did not actually meet his future wife, Mary-Kay, in The Boomerang Café but actually by a water tank. Williamson performed at the opening of the New Parliament House. In September 1989, he issued Warragul (meaning dingo in the Wiradjuri language), which became his first number-one album the following month. That same year Variety Club named him 'Entertainer of the Year'.

=== 1990s ===
At the Country Music Awards of Australia for 1990, John Williamson won 'Top Selling Album' and 'Album of the Year' for Warragul, and 'Heritage Award' for "Drover's Boy". At the ARIA Music Awards of 1990, Warragul earned his third Best Country Album award. In October 1990 Williamson released JW's Family Album which reached No. 21. In 1990 a new version of "Old Man Emu" appeared as a single, with a new lyric added: "He can run the pants off a dingo too". In September 1992 his next album, Waratah St, was released it reached No. 14 on the ARIA Albums Chart, and had received a gold certificate on pre-sale orders. At the Country Music Awards of Australia in January 1992, he won 'Top Selling Album' for JW's Family Album.

Late in 1991 he combined with other country musicians, Slim Dusty, Joy McKean, Phil Matthews and Max Ellis to organise the founding of the Country Music Association of Australia (CMAA), which "would fight for the interests of the Australian country music industry particularly in regard to the Awards". It was launched in January 1992 with Dusty as inaugural chairman and Williamson as vice-chairman and later that year CMAA took over the organisation of the Country Music Awards of Australia – established in 1973 – from radio station, 2TM based in Tamworth. Williamson's compilation, Australia Calling – All the Best Vol 2, was released in October, which peaked at number 32 and was certified platinum. Its lead single, "Australia Calling", was also released while another new track was the studio recording of "I'll Be Gone", and was used to raise awareness for homeless youth. At the beginning of 1993, Williamson issued Love is a Good Woman, a compilation of his love songs, with new tracks "Good Woman" and "Misty Blue". In September that year, after watching the TV announcement that Sydney had won the bid to host the 2000 Summer Olympics, Williamson wrote "Sydney 2000" and was invited to perform it on the steps of the Sydney Opera House. A year later, it was recorded for his next album, Mulga to Mangoes, which peaked at No. 14. Associated singles were "Seven Year Itch", "River Crying Out" and "Tropical Fever".

At the Country Music Awards of Australia in January 1995, he won 'Video Track of the Year' for "Tropical Fever" – directed by Mark Jago. During the year he celebrated twenty-five years in the Australian music industry with a new compilation, True Blue – The Very Best of John Williamson, which reached the top 30. It included two new tracks, "Bush Town (The Lawnmower Song)" and "No-one Loves Brisbane Like Jesus". At that time, he published his book, True Blue: Stories and Songs of Australia, which contains the lyrics of his songs and explanations of their composition. Williamson was surprised at the book's launch by Mike Munro as part of the TV documentary series, This is Your Life. He appeared on the series again in 2000 when Slim Dusty was the subject of an episode. At the Country Music Awards of Australia in January 1996, Williamson won 'Top Selling Album' for Mulga to Mangoes. He released Family Album No.2 in September 1996.

In January the following year he was inducted to the Country Music Association of Australia's Roll of Renown. Williamson's thirteenth studio album Pipe Dream was released in August 1997 and peaked at No. 6. At the Country Music Awards of Australia for 1998 he won 'Top Selling Album' for Pipe Dream. "Sir Don", his tribute to cricketer Donald Bradman, is on the album. Williamson performed "Raining on the Rock" as a duet with Warren H Williams. The following year, at the Australian Country Music Awards, the pair won 'Collaboration of the Year'. Williamson soon took part in his short-lived television series on the Seven Network called The Bush Telegraph. Following this for a moderate period, Williamson continued touring Australia and was also releasing a series of compilations. In July 1999 his fourteenth studio album, The Way It Is was released and peaked at No. 10, it went gold after eight weeks. At the end of 1999, he published his first calendar, by using photography from Steve Parish.

=== 2000s ===
At the Country Music Awards of Australia for 2000 John Williamson won 'Top Selling Album' for The Way It Is, 'Heritage Song of the Year' for "Campfire on the Road" and 'Bush Ballad of the Year' for "Three Sons". He released his next compilation album, Anthems – A Celebration of Australia in August 2000, which peaked at No. 16. A new single, "This Ancient Land", was recorded with country music veteran, Jimmy Little, for Corroboree that year. Other anthem tracks include "A Number on My Back" for the national rugby union team, Wallabies, and "The Baggy Green" with vocals by national cricket captain Steve Waugh. Also on the album are "Waltzing Matilda 2000" and a studio recording of "Advance Australia Fair" for the first time. He was invited to perform at the opening ceremony of the Sydney 2000 Summer Olympics.

Williamson performed "Sir Don" at Bradman's Memorial Service in Adelaide in 2001. The original scraps of paper he used to compose the track are displayed in the Bradman Museum, Bowral. He also represented Australia when performing at the Opening Ceremony of Winterlude in Ottawa, Ontario, Canada. In April 2002, Williamson released his fifteenth studio album, Gunyah, which in the traditional Aboriginal language means 'home'. The opening track "Sing You the Outback" revealed how important the Australian outback has been in the past and how invaluable it will be into the future. The next two tracks, "Frangipani Bay" and "Cape York Peninsula", were written during a road trip to Australia's most northern point. The lyrics in "The Devil's Boots" relate to the bushranger, Ned Kelly. "Buried in Her Bedclothes" was written after Williamson and Mary-Kay, his spouse of the time, met an elderly woman on an Indian Pacific rail trip. Her husband had died six months earlier and she had refused to get out of bed for three months. Her family suggested the train trip as a remedy – she shared her memories with the Williamsons and said that the train 'had done the job'.

Williamson referred to 2003 as his 'most True Blue year ever'. He was elected President of the CMAA after Dusty retired. He then released the sequel to the 1995 compilation True Blue Two, which reached No. 8. It featured his hit songs up to the Gunyah album and exclusively including five new tracks. On 12 October, Williamson was asked by the Prime Minister, John Howard, to perform "Waltzing Matilda" at the Memorial Service for the first Anniversary of the 2002 Bali bombings.

At the Country Music Awards of Australia for 2004 Williamson and Sara Storer won 'Vocal Collaboration of the Year' and 'Single of the Year' for "Raining on the Plains", and the track won 'Song of the Year' which was shared with Storer and her co-writers, Garth Porter and Doug Storer. The track is on Storer's 2002 album, Beautiful Circle. With regard to new arrangements of John's songs, having recorded a cover version of Stan Coster's "Wobbly Boot Hotel" on Waratah St in 1991, he re-recorded it in 2004 as a duet with Coster's daughter Tracy on "Coster Country", her tribute album to him. 2005 was a productive year for John in terms of recording and touring; he re-recorded "Wrinkles" as a duet with John Stephan, issued a twenty-track compilation of Queensland-themed songs, called "From Bulldust to Bitumen", available only to RACQ members, and in August, Chandelier of Stars was released, which reached No. 11 on the ARIA Albums Chart. At the Country Music Awards of Australia for 2006 he won 'Album of the Year' and 'Top Selling Album' for Chandelier of Stars, and the track "Bells in a Bushman's Ear" won 'Bush Ballad of the Year'.

In discussing John's wife of the time, the opening track, "Little Girl from the Dryland", describes Mary-Kay and her childhood in Tulloona Bore, south of Boggabilla, from her point of view. "Chandelier of Stars" is a description of the night sky before sunrise. "Bells in a Bushman's Ear" is a tribute to Australia's country music forefathers, and "The Camel Boy" is about the life of indigenous artist, Albert Namatjira, who is Warren H Williams' great uncle. "Keeper of the Stones", which first appeared on Williamson's live album and DVD of 2004, Mates on the Road, was dedicated to indigenous Australians of The Stolen Generation. "Desert Child", another duet with Williams is a bush lullaby for Aboriginal children. Also on Chandelier of Stars is "A Country Balladeer" which is a duet with Chad Morgan, and "Flower on the Water" is a tribute to the victims of the Bali bombings. The first four lines are inspired by words on a photo of a deceased victim: "To hear your voice, to see you smile / To sit and talk to you awhile / To be together the same old way / That would be our greatest wish today". Williamson found the author and started a friendship.

The following November, Williamson released the new song "We Love This Country" on a compilation of the same name with his favourite holiday songs to promote Australian tourism with caravans – it became a jingle for Jayco commercials. He promoted the aforementioned projects of 2005 together with Pixie Jenkins and Warren H Williams as part of their True Blue Reunion Tour. In August 2006, The Platinum Collection, a three-disc set of Williamson's hits from 1970–2005 was released. In September, Williamson was devastated after hearing of the death of fellow wildlife conservationist and friend, Steve Irwin. In reaction to the news, he wrote a tribute tune, "Wildlife Warriors: It's Time". He was evidently emotional while performing both "Home Among the Gum Trees" and "True Blue" at Irwin's memorial service inside the arena of his Australia Zoo Crocoseum. The service was filmed live-to-air and later released on DVD. Wildlife Warriors was additionally released in November 2006 on a compilation album of the same name, along with twelve of Williamson's favourite conservation awareness tracks and his two live performances from Irwin's memorial.

At the beginning of 2008 Williamson decided to put together a musical. Based on his music and lyrics, the book by Simon Heath and directed by Bernie Zelvis, Williamson named it Quambatook – The Musical. On 7 February 2008, the musical was premiered at the EVAN Theater in Penrith to positive reviews, making it a major highlight in the history of Australian musical theatre.

The album Hillbilly Road was released in August 2008. The lyrics for the album were inspired by his home in Springbrook. Subsequent singles that followed were "Cydi", "Drink a Little Love", "Australia Is Another Word for Free" as a trio with Williams and Amos Morris, and "Better Than a Picture". "The Joy Is in the Journey" was a special bonus addition to finish the album, previously appearing on the Quambatook Musical soundtrack. The Hillbilly Road album was promoted everywhere around Australia until early the next year when Williams decided to move on and pursue other musical projects, leaving Williamson to perform the rest of the tour solo. At the Country Music Awards of Australia for 2009 he won 'Bush Ballad of the Year' for "Australia Is Another Word for Free", performed by Williamson, Williams and Morris.

By late 2009 Williamson got together with fellow country star Adam Harvey and recorded their cover to Roger Miller's "King of the Road", issued both as a single and on Harvey's duets album Both Sides Now. Williamson then made his Carols By Candlelight debut at the Sidney Myer Music Bowl.

=== 2010s ===
On 26 January (Australia Day) 2010 Williamson released a new Australian anthem called "Island of Oceans" as a duet with Shannon Noll. Williamson released a new double-CD compilation album Absolute Greatest: 40 Years True Blue commemorating this milestone. At a press conference for the album in Tamworth on 21 January hosted by the then Governor-General Quentin Bryce, in his acceptance speech, John expressed his gratitude for the longevity of his career up to that point, in the process thanking his fans, friends and family, including his first wife, Mary-Kay.

On 28 January 2011 Williamson released a recording of a concert with the Sydney Symphony Orchestra at the Sydney Opera House. At the Australian Country Music Awards in Tamworth that same month John presented Jimmy Little with the Lifetime Achievement Award.

In January 2012, Williamson released The Big Red. The first two singles lifted from the work are "Hang My Hat in Queensland" and the title track. Early in 2013 "Prairie Hotel Parachilna" was released. In 2013, a new two-disc set of John's hits, Hell of a Career was released. In 2014, Williamson released his fiftieth album (counting compilations, live recordings and reissues) called Honest People, as well as writing his autobiography, issued by Penguin. Both were released on 25 July 2014. As well as this, he made his debut as an exhibitionist painter. In 2014, it was announced by John via A Current Affair that he has been diagnosed with prostate cancer.

In April 2016, he released an EP called Looking for a Story, a new ANZAC tribute and six other sets of previously issued lyrics. John released his twentieth studio album Butcherbird in August 2018.

=== 2020s ===
In 2020, Williamson celebrated 50 years since the release of "Old Man Emu", by releasing a 25xCD single box set, featuring 50 tracks spanning his career. Williamson said "Putting together this collection gave me a chance to take stock of what I've achieved during my career... While I'm not looking to retire just yet, once I've completed my 2020 Winding Back Tour I'll be scaling down my live appearances. I've always loved the connection I receive when performing, so you'll still see me popping up at festivals and special events. Winding Back mainly means I'm looking forward to spending more time in the garden and less time away from home fiddling about with those hard to open motel soaps." JW 50 – Winding Back 1970–2020 was released on 19 June 2020 and peaked at number 50 on the ARIA Charts.

In September 2023, Williamson released two singles in support of the "Yes" campaign for the 2023 Australian Indigenous Voice referendum: "Voice From The Heart" and "Uluru Forever".

In January 2025, Williamson announced a continuation of his 55 Years – My Travellin' Days Are Done tour and his 21st studio album How Many Songs was released on 4 April 2025.

Williamson performed True Blue before play of the third test in the 2025-26 Ashes series at Adelaide Oval in a tribute to the victims of the Bondi Beach terrorist attack.

The final four concerts of the “My Travellin’ Days Are Done” schedule were performed on May 22nd 2026 at Hamer Hall in Flinders Street, Melbourne, followed by three nights on June 6 - 8 at John’s Springbrook property, thus announcing his retirement from touring. He continues to record new music. His first new song since retiring from performing is a single named “September Wind”.

== Personal life ==
In the early 1970s John was living in Leichhardt and met Mary-Kay Price. Her parents had farmed on Tulloona Plain between Moree and Goondiwindi, and her father was a World War II soldier-settler. In 1973, Williamson married Mary-Kay on her parents' farm. The couple have two daughters, Ami and Georgie. Ami recalled "[w]hen Dad was away, he was really away". Over his career Williamson has written some love songs for Mary-Kay including "Little Girl from the Dryland". On 23 April 2007, after more than 30 years of marriage, Williamson and Mary-Kay divorced. Williamson admitted that he preferred Springbrook in south-east Queensland to unwind and get inspiration for new material.

Following his marriage break-up, Williamson formed a relationship with a new partner, Meg Doyle, who organises some of his activities. The couple divide their time living together between Springbrook and their Sydney apartment and were married in March 2013. His daughter, Ami, is also a musician, who has toured with Williamson. In early 2008, she toured Australian Defence Force bases in Iraq and Afghanistan to play to troops: she appeared on two episodes, "Show of Force", on Australian Story (May 2008) describing the tour. Williamson also appeared on the same episodes he had advised his daughter "to sing stuff that's going to be good for the boys". Ami explained her motivation for going "I've got, you know, a history of entertainers in my family ... [who] have performed for the military, my dad has, so I feel like I've taken the baton, which is cool".

Williamson is a supporter and activist for Australia becoming a Republic, stating "I believe that those who cling to the Monarchy [...] are no different [...] from those who objected to the then proposed Federation [...]. In other words, there is no doubt in my mind that a Republic is inevitable [...]."

His middle brother Robin died of cancer in 1999. The song "Salisbury Street" on Williamson's 2002 album "Gunyah" was dedicated to Robin. Salisbury Street was the location of their second home in Quambatook.

These days Williamson lives on the Gold Coast in the hinterland suburb of Springbrook where he will occasionally host live concerts at a venue he built known as Willoshed.

== Criticism and controversy ==
"Call Me Blue" from the nineteenth album, Honest People, was written in reaction to the verbal abuse that Williamson received after resigning as president of the CMAA. He gave up the position of his own volition, unhappy with the "growing influence of American music".

He released a single titled "A Flag of Our Own", which saw him being banned from performing in several RSL Clubs.

== Discography ==
=== Studio albums ===
- John Williamson (1970)
- Comic Strip Cowboy (1976)
- Road to Town (1978)
- Fair Dinkum J.W. (1982)
- Road Thru the Heart (1985)
- Mallee Boy (1986)
- Boomerang Café (1988)
- Warragul (1989)
- JW's Family Album (1990)
- Waratah St (1991)
- Mulga to Mangoes (1994)
- Family Album No.2 (1996)
- Pipe Dream (1997)
- The Way It Is (1999)
- Gunyah (2002)
- Chandelier of Stars (2005)
- Hillbilly Road (2008)
- The Big Red (2012)
- Honest People (2014)
- Butcherbird (2018)
- How Many Songs (2025)

== Honours, awards and nominations ==
On Australia Day 1992 John Williamson was made a Member of the Order of Australia (AM) with the citation: "for service to Australian country music and in stimulating awareness of conservation issues". In the 2006 book, 1001 Australians You Should Know, music journalists, Toby Creswell and Samantha Chenoweth describe him as "[o]ne of the most popular songwriters in Australia ... [h]e has been a voice for the people of the bush and he has been a voice of dissent, openly criticising the woodchip industry". He is also a Protect Our Coral Sea Ambassador.

In mid-2015, Williamson was nominated for the 2015 Sounds of Australia competition by veteran Australian TV presenter and journalist Steve Liebmann.

=== APRA Awards ===
These annual awards were established by Australasian Performing Right Association (APRA) in 1982 to honour the achievements of songwriters and music composers, and to recognise their songwriting skills, sales and airplay performance, by its members annually. John Williamson has won three APRA Music Awards, in the allied categories 'Most Performed Australasian Country Work' and 'Most Performed Country Work'.

Year	Nominee / work	Award	Result
1988	"True Blue"	Most Performed Australasian Country Work	Won
1990	"Rip Rip Woodchip"	Most Performed Australasian Country Work	Won
1995	"Tropical Fever" (John Williamson)	Most Performed Country Work	Won

=== ARIA Awards ===
The ARIA Music Awards are presented annually from 1987 by the Australian Recording Industry Association (ARIA). John Williamson has won four awards from twelve nominations, including his induction into the ARIA Hall of Fame on 27 October 2010. He has won the 'Best Country Album' category three times, including the inaugural award in 1987, from six nominations.

Year	Nominee / work	Award	Result
1987	Mallee Boy	Best Country Album	Won
1987	Mallee Boy	Best Indigenous Release	Nominated
1989	Boomerang Café	Best Country Album	Won
1990	Warragul	Best Country Album	Won
1990	Warragul	Best Adult Contemporary Album	Nominated
1991	JW's Family Album	Best Children's Album	Nominated
1992	Waratah St	Best Country Album	Nominated
1992	Waratah St	Best Adult Contemporary Album	Nominated
1994	Love Is a Good Woman	Best Country Album	Nominated
1996	True Blue – The Very Best of John Williamson	Highest Selling Album	Nominated
1998	"Raining on the Rock" (duet with Warren H Williams)	Best Indigenous Release	Nominated
2000	The Way It Is	Best Country Album	Nominated
2010	John Williamson	ARIA Hall of Fame	Inductee
2023	Australian Marine Conservation Society: Voice of the Sea (INNOCEAN Australia Pty Ltd)	Best Use of an Australian Recording in an Advertisement (over 2 minutes duration)	Won

=== CMAA Awards ===
These annual awards have been presented since 1973 and have been organised by Country Music Association of Australia (CMAA) from 1993, to "encourage, promote and recognise excellence in Australian country music recording". From that time the recipient's trophy has been a Golden Guitar. John Williamson has won twenty-eight Country Music Awards of Australia, including induction into their Roll of Renown in 1997.

Year	Nominee / work	Award	Result (wins only)
1985	"Queen in the Sport of Kings"	Song of the Year	Won
1986	Road thru the Heart	Album of the Year	Won
1986	"You and My Guitar"	Male Vocalist of the Year	Won
1987	Mallee Boy	Album of the Year	Won
1987	"True Blue"	Male Vocalist of the Year	Won
1988	Mallee Boy	Top Selling Album	Won
1989	Boomerang Café	Album of the Year	Won
1989	Boomerang Café	Top Selling Album	Won
1990	Warragul	Album of the Year	Won
1990	Warragul	Top Selling Album	Won
1990	"Drover's Boy"	Heritage Award	Won
1992	JW's Family Album	Top Selling Album	Won
1995	"Tropical Fever" – directed by Mark Jago	Video Track of the Year	Won
1996	Mulga to Mangoes	Top Selling Album	Won
1997	John Williamson	Roll of Renown	Inductee
1998	Pipe Dream	Top Selling Album	Won
2000	The Way It Is	Top Selling Album of the Year	Won
2000	"Campfire on the Road"	Heritage Song of the Year	Won
2000	"Three Sons"	Bush Ballad of the Year	Won
2004	"Raining on the Plains" (duet with Sara Storer)	Vocal Collaboration of the Year	Won
2004	"Raining on the Plains" (duet with Sara Storer)	Single of the Year	Won
2004	"Raining on the Plains" (duet with Sara Storer)	APRA Song of the Year (Note: This award is shared by "Raining on the Plains"'s composers Sara Storer, Garth Porter and Doug Storer; it is performed as a duet by Williamson with Sara Storer.)	Won
2006	Chandelier of Stars	Album of the Year	Won
2006	Chandelier of Stars	Top Selling Album of the Year	Won
2006	"Bells in a Bushman's Ear"	Bush Ballad of the Year	Won
2009	"Australia Is Another Word for Free" (with Warren H Williams and Amos Morris)	Bush Ballad of the Year	Won
2014	"Pozie" (with Sara Storer)	Vocal Collaboration of the Year	Won
2019	"Please Don't Forget Me"	Bush Ballad of the Year	Won

=== Mo Awards ===
The Australian Entertainment Mo Awards (commonly known informally as the Mo Awards), were annual Australian entertainment industry awards. They recognise achievements in live entertainment in Australia from 1975 to 2016. Williamson won eight awards in that time.

Year	Nominee / work	Award	Result (wins only)
1986	John Williamson	Male Country Entertainer of the Year	Won
1987	John Williamson	Male Country Entertainer of the Year	Won
1988	John Williamson	Male Country Entertainer of the Year	Won
1990	John Williamson	Country Performer of the Year	Won
1991	John Williamson	Country Performer of the Year	Won
1991	John Williamson	Male Country Entertainer of the Year	Won
1991	John Williamson	Most Success Attraction of the Year	Won
1992	John Williamson	Most Success Attraction of the Year	Won

=== Tamworth Songwriters Awards ===
The Tamworth Songwriters Association (TSA) is an annual songwriting contest for original country songs, awarded in January at the Tamworth Country Music Festival. They commenced in 1986. John Williamson has won eight awards.

Year	Nominee / work	Award	Result (wins only)
1988	"When We Were Kids" by John Williamson and Allan Caswell	Country Song of the Year	Won
1992	"Papa Whiskey November" by John Williamson	Country Song of the Year	Won
1996	"Bush Town (The Lawn Mower Song)" by John Williamson	Children's Song of the Year	Won
1997	"Kitchy Kitch Koo" by John Williamson	Children's Song of the Year	Won
1998	"Old Farts in a Caravan Park" by John Williamson	Comedy / Novelty Song of the Year	Won
2000	"Purple Roses" by John Williamson	Contemporary Song of the Year	Won
2000	"Purple Roses" by John Williamson	Country Song of the Year	Won
2004	John Williamson	Tex Morton Award	Awarded

== Bibliography ==
John Williamson has written or co-written the following:

- Valentine, Garrison; Williamson, John; Singleton, Glen (1995). The Golden Kangaroo. illustrated by Glen Singleton. Sydney: Scholastic. ISBN 186388243X.
- Williamson, John (1995). True Blue: Stories and Songs of Australia. Pymble: Angus & Robertson. ISBN 0207189102.
- Williamson, John (1997). Old Man Emu. illustrated by Rolf Harris. Pymble, NSW: HarperCollins. ISBN 0207191352.
- Williamson, John (1998). John Williamson's Christmas in Australia. illustrated by Glen Singleton. Sydney: Scholastic Australia. ISBN 186388999X.
- Williamson, John (2000). Anthems: A Celebration of Australia. London: Wise Publications. ISBN 1876871121.
- Williamson, John (2003). True Blue Two: More Stories and Songs of Australia. Sydney: HarperCollins. ISBN 0732278767.
- Williamson, John (2014). Hey True Blue. Melbourne: Penguin Australia. ISBN 9781921901744.
- Williamson, John (2014). John Williamson's Christmas in Australia. illustrated by Mitch Vane. Melbourne: Penguin Australia. ISBN 9780670077724.

== See also ==
- Category:John Williamson (singer) albums
- Category:John Williamson (singer) songs
- John Farnham
