= Give Me a Home Among the Gumtrees =

Australian popular song

"Give Me a Home Among the Gumtrees" (or "Home Among the Gumtrees") is a popular Australian song written in 1974 by Wally Johnson and Bob Brown (aka Captain Rock).

== History ==
It was originally performed as a satirical number in Johnson and Brown's comedy act at the Flying Trapeze Cafe in Fitzroy, Melbourne and was first recorded in 1975 on the Captain Rock album Buried Treasure on Mushroom Records. At that time the Australian Government was running an open competition to find a replacement for God Save the Queen as Australia's national anthem; the Gumtrees song was Johnson and Brown's entry.

In 1982, although this story is not confirmed by all members of the band, Bullamakanka recorded a cover version of Gumtrees, which then became a hit. The song was later recorded by popular Australian country music singer-songwriter John Williamson, thus increasing its popularity with many mistakenly believing Williamson to be the original composer. Bullamakanka made some changes to the lyrics, which were also retained in Williamson's recording. These tended to water down the original tongue-in-cheek nature of the song. Bullamankanka's version peaked at number 88 on the Australian charts in May 1982.

Bullamakanka's version was later used as the theme song for a popular gardening and lifestyle television program called Burke's Backyard, which ran on Australian television for 17 years. The program once held a competition for the best school video version of Home Among the Gumtrees, and thousands of entries were submitted; one of the winners was an Aboriginal community school group who sang the song in their own language.

Home Among the Gumtrees has a set of mime actions accompanying the chorus which are familiar to people throughout Australia, although their exact origins are unknown.

The song has become one of the most frequently recorded Australian compositions of all time and is a standard in Australian folk music. A variety of artists have covered it, ranging from bushbands like Paradiddle to international superstar violinist André Rieu, who included it on his 2008 album Waltzing Matilda. John Williamson performed Gumtrees at the 2006 memorial service to commemorate popular Australian wildlife expert and TV personality Steve Irwin; the program was followed by a worldwide television audience reputedly numbering 300 million viewers.

Co-writer Wally Johnson died of pneumonia in 1995. Bob Brown has continued writing and performing tongue-in-cheek folk songs, which have been covered by artists including John Williamson and folk singer Slim Dusty. One of Brown's numbers, "I'm an Individual", was recorded by cult Australian rules footballer Mark "Jacko" Jackson, and became an Australia-wide hit. Brown has also recorded an album of children's songs called Riding Round on Golf Balls. Brown, in his persona as rubber-faced "Captain Rock", appears in the 1979 film Snapshot.
