= Old Man Emu =

Single by John Williamson

from the album John Williamson
- B-side: "Gum Tree"
- Released: May 1970
- Studio: Trafalgar Studios, Sydney
- Genre: Country
- Length: 2:50
- Label: Fable Records
- Songwriter: John Williamson
- Producer: John Williamson

John Williamson singles chronology
"Old Man Emu" (1970)	"Under the Bridge/The Unexplored Shadows of Mine" (1970)

"Old Man Emu" is a song written and recorded by the Australian country singer John Williamson. In 1970, Williamson performed the song on TV talent show, New Faces, winning first place. Williamson signed with Fable Records after the win.

"Old Man Emu" was released in May 1970 as Williamson's first single and the lead single from his album, John Williamson. The song peaked at number 4 on the Kent Music Report and was certified gold in Australia

== Track listing ==
7"
No.	Title	Length
1.	"Old Man Emu"
2.	"Gum Tree"

== Charts ==
=== Weekly charts ===
Chart (1970)	Peak position
Australia (Kent Music Report)	4

=== Year-end charts ===
Chart (1970)	Peak position
Australia (Kent Music Report)	20

== Release history ==
Region	Date	Format	Edition(s)	Label	Catalogue
Australia	May 1970	7"/12" Vinyl	Standard	Fable Records	FB-008
