= Rip Rip Woodchip =

Single by John Williamson

from the album Warragul
- Released: August 1989
- Studio: Trafalgar Studios, Sydney
- Genre: Country
- Label: Festival Records
- Songwriter(s): John Williamson
- Producer(s): John Williamson

John Williamson singles chronology
"Station Cook" (1989)	"Rip Rip Woodchip" (1989)	"Boogie with M'Baby" (1989)

"Rip Rip Woodchip" is a song by Australian country singer John Williamson. The song was released in August 1989 as the second single from Williamson's eighth studio album Warragul. The song peaked at number 39 on the ARIA Charts. $1 from each sale went towards the Australian Conservation Foundation.

At the 1990 APRA Awards (Australia), the song won Most Performed Australasian Country Work.

In 1995, the logging industry threatened to sue Williamson over the song. Williamson said "People say I'm a green, but I'm not. It's just how I feel and if you don't like it, too bad. I became a conservationist in 1980 when I woke up to it. I left farming in part because I'm so into trees. I think an old growth forest is more important than the Sydney Town Hall. Surely that heritage is more important than the other? Surely?"

== Track listing ==
7"
No.	Title	Length
1.	"Rip Rip Woodchip"
2.	"It's A Way Of Life"

12"
No.	Title	Length
1.	"Rip Rip Woodchip"
2.	"It's A Way Of Life"
3.	"Goodbye Blinky Bill" (with Bullamakanka with Ami and Georgie Williamson)
4.	"Home Among the Gum Trees"

== Charts ==
Chart performance for "Rip Rip Woodchip"
Chart (1989)	Peak position
Australia (ARIA)	39

== Release history ==
Region	Date	Format	Edition(s)	Label	Catalogue
Australia	July 1989	Cassette; 7"/12" Vinyl	Standard	Festival Records	K930 / X14693
