= Country Music Association of Australia =

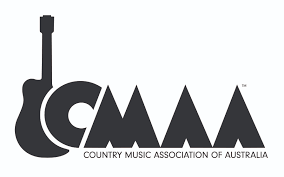
- Official logo
- Abbreviation: CMAA
- Formation: 1992; 33 years ago

The Country Music Association of Australia (CMAA) is an association formed in 1992 that promotes and represents the Australian country music industry. As the peak national industry body, its activities include organisation, promotion and staging of the CMAA Country Music Awards of Australia, CMAA Australian College of Country Music, CMAA College Graduation Concert, CMAA Australian Country Music Achiever Awards, CMAA Golden Guitar Winners' Concerts and the CMAA Australian National Bluegrass Championship. Additionally the association is involved in industry research, professional development and promotion. In January 2018, Dan Biddle took over as chair of the association.

== History ==
The first board of the CMAA was chaired by Slim Dusty, with vice chairman John Williamson, secretary Max Ellis, treasurer Joy McKean and public officer Phil Matthews. Other members were Ron Adsett, Wally Bishop, Lindsay Butler, Allan Caswell, Rod Coe, Brett Cottle, Nick Erby, Meryl Gross, John Kane, Tim Kirkland, Anne Kirkpatrick, John McSweeney, Deniese Morrison, Dobe Newton, Norma O'Hara Murphy, John Spence and Brian Young.
