= Raining on the Rock =

Single by John Williamson

from the album Mallee Boy
- A-side: "Raining on the Rock"
- B-side: "Back at the Isa"
- Released: January 1987
- Genre: Country music
- Length: 4:27
- Label: Festival Records
- Songwriter(s): John Williamson
- Producer(s): John Williamson

John Williamson singles chronology
"True Blue" (1986)	"Raining on the Rock" (1987)	"Cootamundra Wattle" (1987)

"Raining on the Rock" is a song written and performed by Australian singer-songwriter John Williamson. The title is in reference to Uluru with references in the song to Albert Namatjira and Kata Tjuta (The Olgas). The song was released in January 1987 as the second single from Williamson's sixth studio album Mallee Boy.

In 2011, Williamson was asked which song is he most proud of and he said ""Raining on the Rock". I'm not necessarily the most proud of it but it's a song that probably means a lot to me because it's about the heart of the country and I think the rock represents that. The ancient nature of the country that was here before any of us is the one thing that can draw us all together, putting religion, politics and race aside."

In 2014, Chris Johnston from Sydney Morning Herald called "Raining on the Rock" one of the best songs on John Williamson's best albums. It has also been referenced as an unofficial Australian anthem.

== Track listing ==
7"
No.	Title	Length
1.	"Raining on the Rock"	4:27
2.	"Back at the Isa"

== 1998 version ==
"Raining on the Rock"

Single by John Williamson and Warren H Williams

from the album Country Friends and Me
- Released: April 1998
- Length: 4:22
- Label: Festival Records
- Songwriter(s): John Williamson

In 1998, Williamson re-recorded "Raining on the Rock" with Warren H Williams, for Williams' second studio album Country Friends and Me.

At the ARIA Music Awards of 1998, Williamson and Williams performed the song. The song was nominated for Best Indigenous Release The song was nominated for vocal collaboration of the year at the 1999 Country Music Awards of Australia, where the duo again performed the track in front of 6,000 fans where they received a standing ovation.

At the 1998 National Indigenous Music Awards, the song won Single Release of the Year.

== Release history ==
Region	Date	Format	Edition(s)	Label	Catalogue
Australia	January 1987	7" Vinyl	Standard	Festival Records	K-209
Australia	April 1998	CD single	Standard	EMI Music	885433.2

== Other versions ==
- In 2007, Felicity Urquhart covered the song on the album, The Great Australian Songbook Volume 2
- In 2011, The Wayfarers covered the song on their album Waltzing Matilda
- In 2013 Neil Ward covered the song on his album, Raining on the Rock - 18 Aussie Bush Folk Ballads
