= True Blue (John Williamson song) =

1982 song by John Williamson

Single by John Williamson

from the album True Blue - The Best of John Williamson
- A-side: "True Blue"
- B-side: "The Year of the Tree"
- Released: March 1982
- Studio: Honeyfarm
- Genre: Country, folk
- Length: 3:29
- Label: Festival
- Songwriter: John Williamson
- Producer: John Williamson

John Williamson singles chronology
"The Diggers of the Anzac (This Is Gallipoli)" (1981)	"True Blue" (1982)	"(You've Gotta Be) Fair Dinkum" (1982)

"True Blue" or "Hey, True Blue" is an Australian country music, folk song written and performed by singer-songwriter John Williamson. The lyrical content utilises Australian slang heavily, with the title meaning authentically Australian. The song was first released in March 1982, as a single from his compilation album, True Blue – The Best of John Williamson, but it failed to reach the Kent Music Report top 100 singles chart. He re-recorded "True Blue" in 1986 and re-issued it as a single in that September, this version was used for the Australian Made advertising campaign managed by entrepreneur, John Singleton. It reached number 43 on the singles chart.

== Background ==
"True Blue" was written by Australian singer-songwriter, John Robert Williamson as a country music, folk song. The title is Australian slang for authentically Australian (from a British phrase). He was asked to write the song by advertising entrepreneur, John Singleton for a proposed television show, which never eventuated.

The 1986 version was used for the Australian Made campaign as managed by Singleton. Williamson recalled in 1987, "I thought it would be a good idea to write a song for [the campaign]"; Singleton replied that Williamson had, "already written the ideal song back in 1982 with 'True Blue'." The original lyrics contain numerous Australian slang and cultural terms. They included a reference to Vegemite, a yeast-extract food spread. The song has been adopted by the Australia national cricket team and the Australia national rugby union team as an unofficial theme song and is often performed at sporting events or other ceremonies.

Williamson performed the song in September 2006 on acoustic guitar at Australia Zoo during Steve Irwin's public memorial service (it was Irwin's favourite song): first, shortly after the beginning of the ceremony, and again at the end as Irwin's truck was driven out of the Crocoseum (crocodile exhibit) for the final time.

In March 2009, Williamson performed a 30-minute musical, The Story of True Blue, which relates how an Australian cattle dog loses its family in a bushfire. It was narrated by Shannon Noll, and it combined stock men, livestock, motorbikes and circus performers. In January 2018, as part of Triple M's "Ozzest 100", a list of the most Australian songs of all time, "True Blue" was ranked number 27. The song was used at anti-immigration rallies in October 2025, without Williamson's approval.

In December 2025, Williamson performed "True Blue" before the start of the 3rd Ashes Test at the Adelaide Oval in response to the shooting at Bondi Beach in Sydney that happened 3 days prior.

In the popular Australian kids TV show Bluey, a character named Pat can be heard singing parts of this song on two occasions.

== Track listing ==
7"
No.	Title	Length
1.	"True Blue"	3:29
2.	"The Year of the Tree"	3:13

== 1986 version ==
"True Blue"

Single by John Williamson

from the album Mallee Boy
- A-side: "True Blue"
- B-side: "Alice Springs"
- Released: September 1986
- Genre: Country music
- Label: Festival Records
- Songwriter: John Williamson
- Producer: John Williamson

John Williamson singles chronology
"Goodbye Blinky Bill" (1986)	"True Blue" (1986)	"Raining on the Rock" (1987)

In 1986, Williamson re-recorded "True Blue" and released it in September 1986 as the lead single from his sixth studio album Mallee Boy. The song was used for the Australian Made campaign. The song peaked at number 43 on the Kent Music Report. At the 1988 APRA Awards (Australia), the song won Most Performed Australasian Country Work.

== Vegemite controversy ==
The original lyrics included the lines "Is it standin’ by your mate when he’s in a fight – or just Vegemite”. When Vegemite's American owners Kraft Foods refused to contribute to the Australian Made campaign, Williamson changed the second line to "or will she be right” for the version celebrating the song’s twenty-first anniversary from 2003 onwards. After Vegemite was later bought by the Australian Bega Group, Williamson reverted the lyrics to "or just Vegemite". However, sometimes he will substitute the lyrics "or just MightyMite" (a similar spread made by Three Threes Condiments), saying "it depends on how I feel".

== Track listing ==
7"
No.	Title	Length
1.	"True Blue"
2.	"Alice Springs"

== Charts ==
Chart (1986)	Peak position
Australia (Kent Music Report)	43

== Release history ==
Region	Date	Format	Edition(s)	Label	Catalogue
Australia	March 1982	7" Vinyl	Standard	Festival Records	K-8653
Australia	September 1986	7" Vinyl	Standard	Festival Records	K-111
