= Greatest Hits (Thin Lizzy album) =

Greatest hits album by Thin Lizzy
- Released: 7 June 2004
- Recorded: 1972–83, 1991
- Genres: Hard rock, blues rock
- Length: 155:36
- Label: Universal Music

Thin Lizzy compilation albums chronology
Vagabonds Kings Warriors Angels (2001)	Greatest Hits (2004)	The Definitive Collection (2006)

Professional ratings
Review scores
Source	Rating
AllMusic	4.5/5 stars
Record Collector	4/5 stars

Greatest Hits is a double-CD compilation of Thin Lizzy songs released in 2004.

== Track listing ==
All tracks written by Phil Lynott unless stated.

=== Disc 1 ===
1. "The Boys Are Back in Town" from Jailbreak
2. "Jailbreak" from Jailbreak
3. "Don't Believe a Word" from Johnny the Fox
4. "Dancing in the Moonlight (It's Caught Me in Its Spotlight)" from Bad Reputation
5. "Rosalie" [Live] (Bob Seger) from Live and Dangerous
6. "Waiting for an Alibi" from Black Rose: A Rock Legend
7. "Do Anything You Want To" from Black Rose: A Rock Legend
8. "Sarah" (Lynott, Gary Moore) from Black Rose: A Rock Legend
9. "Chinatown" (Brian Downey, Scott Gorham, Lynott, Snowy White) from Chinatown
10. "Killer on the Loose" from Chinatown
11. "Trouble Boys" (Billy Bremner) Non-album single
12. "Hollywood (Down on Your Luck)" [Live] (Gorham, Lynott) from Renegade
13. "Cold Sweat" (Lynott, John Sykes) from Thunder and Lightning
14. "Thunder and Lightning" (Downey, Lynott) from Thunder and Lightning
15. "The Sun Goes Down" (Lynott, Darren Wharton) from Thunder and Lightning
16. "Dedication" from Dedication: The Very Best of Thin Lizzy
17. "Still in Love with You" from Nightlife
18. "She Knows" (Gorham, Lynott) from Nightlife
19. "Yellow Pearl" (Lynott, Midge Ure) from Solo in Soho*

=== Disc 2 ===
1. "Whiskey in the Jar" (Trad., arr. Eric Bell, Downey, Lynott) Non-album single
2. "Out in the Fields" (Moore) from Run for Cover†
3. "Parisienne Walkways" (Lynott, Moore) from Back on the Streets‡
4. "Emerald" [Live] (Downey, Gorham, Lynott, Brian Robertson) from Live and Dangerous
5. "Bad Reputation" (Downey, Gorham, Lynott) from Bad Reputation
6. "Wild One" from Fighting
7. "Fighting My Way Back" from Fighting
8. "Showdown" from Nightlife
9. "Black Rose" (Lynott, Moore) from Black Rose: A Rock Legend
10. "Dear Miss Lonely Hearts" (Jimmy Bain, Lynott) from Solo in Soho*
11. "The Rocker" (Bell, Downey, Lynott) from Vagabonds of the Western World
12. "Are You Ready" [Live] (Downey, Gorham, Lynott, Robertson) from Life
13. "Renegade" (Lynott, White) from Renegade
14. "King's Call" from Solo in Soho*
15. "Angel of Death" (Lynott, Wharton) from Renegade
16. "Cowboy Song" [Live At The Sydney Opera House 1979] (Lynott, Downey) Previously unreleased
17. "The Boys Are Back in Town" [Live At The Sydney Opera House 1979] Previously unreleased

=== DVD ===
1. "The Boys Are Back In Town"
2. "Don’t Believe A Word" (Live)
3. "Dancing In The Moonlight" (Live)
4. "Rosalie" (Live)
5. "Waiting For An Alibi"
6. "Do Anything You Want To"
7. "Sarah"
8. "Chinatown"
9. "Killer On The Loose"
10. "Thunder And Lightning" (Live)
11. "Bad Reputation" (Live)
12. "King’s Call" by Phil Lynott
13. "The Rocker"
14. "With Love"
15. "Dear Miss Lonely Hearts" by Phil Lynott
16. "That Woman" (Live)
17. "Johnny The Fox"
18. "Wild One"
19. "Whiskey In The Jar" (TOTP 1.2.73)
- All tracks by Thin Lizzy except:

* Phil Lynott
† Gary Moore and Phil Lynott
‡ Gary Moore

== Personnel ==
- Phil Lynott – bass guitar, vocals
- Brian Downey – drums, percussion
- Eric Bell – guitar on disc 2: tracks 1 & 11
- Scott Gorham – guitar on disc 1: tracks 1–7, 9–18; disc 2: tracks 4–10, 12, 13, 15–17
- Brian Robertson – guitar on disc 1: tracks 1–3, 5, 17 & 18; disc 2: tracks 4, 6–8, 12, 16 & 17
- Gary Moore – guitar on disc 1: tracks 6–8; disc 2: tracks 2, 3 & 9; vocals on disc 2: track 2
- Snowy White – guitar on disc 1: tracks 9–12; disc 2: tracks 10, 13 & 15
- John Sykes – guitar on disc 1: tracks 13–15
- Mark Knopfler – guitar on disc 2: track 14
- Darren Wharton – keyboards on disc 1: tracks 9–15; disc 2: tracks 13 & 15
- Midge Ure – keyboards on disc 1: track 19
- Mark Nauseef – drums on disc 2: tracks 16 & 17

== Charts ==
Chart (2004–06)	Peak position
Irish Albums (IRMA)	2
Norwegian Albums (VG-lista)	18
Scottish Albums (Official Charts)	3
UK Albums (Official Charts)	3
UK Rock & Metal Albums (Official Charts)	1

== Certifications ==
Region	Certification	Certified units/sales
Ireland (IRMA)	3× Platinum	45,000^{^}
United Kingdom (BPI)	Platinum	300,000^{^}
United Kingdom (BPI) 2005 DVD	Gold	25,000^{^}
^{^} Shipments figures based on certification alone.
