= Live in Sweden 1983 =

Live album by Phil Lynott
- Released: April 23, 2002
- Recorded: Disc One recorded in Örebro, Sweden, 5 August 1983; Disc Two recorded in Avesta, Sweden, 6 August 1983
- Label: Zoom Club Records
- Producer: Geoff Gillespie

Phil Lynott chronology
The Philip Lynott Album (1982)	Live in Sweden 1983 (2002)	Yellow Pearl (2010)

Live in Sweden 1983 is a solo album by Phil Lynott, recorded at a performance on August 5, 1983, in Örebro, Sweden, shortly before Thin Lizzy disbanded. The soundboard recording of the show was released in 2002, almost 20 years later, by Mark Stanway on the Zoom Club label. Highlights from the album include the reggae-influenced "Solo in Soho" from Lynott's solo debut and "Parisienne Walkways", the Gary Moore hit written by Lynott. It also includes two new releases: "A Night in the Life of a Blues Singer" and "Look in These Eyes".

== Track listing ==
All songs written by Phil Lynott except where noted.

Disc One

1. "Yellow Pearl" – (4:38)
2. "Old Town" (Jimmy Bain, Lynott) – (4:19)
3. "Sarah" (Lynott, Gary Moore) – (3:32)
4. "A Night in the Life of a Blues Singer" – (6:52)
5. "Look in These Eyes" – (7:31)
6. "Parisienne Walkways" (Lynott, Moore) – (6:20)
7. "Solo in Soho" – (5:56)
8. "King's Call" – (5:31)
9. "Baby Drives Me Crazy" (Brian Downey, Scott Gorham, Lynott, Brian Robertson) – (7:30)
10. "The Boys Are Back in Town" – (5:52)
11. "Still in Love with You" – (9:45)

Disc Two

1. "Yellow Pearl" – (3:54)
2. "Old Town" – (4:12)
3. "Sarah" (Lynott, Moore) – (3:58)
4. "A Night in the Life of a Blues Singer" – (6:25)
5. "Look in These Eyes" – (5:04)
6. "Parisienne Walkways" (Lynott, Moore) – (5:45)
7. "Solo in Soho" – (1:56)
8. "Baby Drives Me Crazy" (Downey, Gorham, Lynott, Robertson) – (10:02)

During "Solo in Soho", Lynott sings the refrain from "The Message" by Grandmaster Flash and The Furious Five and "The Boys Are Back in Town" is introduced by singing part of "Every Breath You Take" by The Police. "Kings Call" also includes the spoken refrain from Elvis Presley's "Are You Lonesome Tonight?". These tracks are not credited.

== Personnel ==
- Phil Lynott – bass guitar, lead vocals
- John Sykes – guitar, backing vocals
- Brian Downey – drums
- Mark Stanway – keyboards
- Donal "Doish" Nagle – guitar
