= Yellow Pearl (album) =

Compilation album by Phil Lynott
- Released: 12 July 2010
- Recorded: 1978–1985
- Genre: Rock
- Label: Spectrum

Phil Lynott chronology
Live in Sweden 1983 (2001)	Yellow Pearl (2010)

Yellow Pearl is a compilation album of songs recorded by Irish rock musician Phil Lynott, released in 2010. The album features songs taken from Lynott's two solo albums, Solo in Soho and The Philip Lynott Album, together with rare singles, remixes and b-sides.

Many members of Lynott's band Thin Lizzy appear on the album including Scott Gorham, Brian Downey, Snowy White, Darren Wharton and Gary Moore. Dire Straits frontman Mark Knopfler plays on two tracks.

The title track "Yellow Pearl" was used as the theme tune for the British TV programme Top of the Pops from 1981 to 1986. Two remixed versions of the song are featured. Two rare b-sides, "Somebody Else's Dream" (from the "Together" single) and "Beat of the Drum" (from "Old Town") were released here for the first time on CD. Lynott's hit single with Gary Moore, "Parisienne Walkways", and his last single release, "Nineteen", were also featured.

The CD came with a booklet featuring photos and an essay by Malcolm Dome.

== Track listing ==
All songs composed by Philip Lynott, except where noted.

1. "Yellow Pearl" [Second 7" remix] (Lynott, Midge Ure) – 3:22
2. "Dear Miss Lonely Hearts" (Jimmy Bain, Lynott) – 4:09
3. "King's Call" – 3:38
4. "A Child's Lullaby" – 2:41
5. "Tattoo (Giving It All Up for Love)" – 3:18
6. "Solo in Soho" – 4:13
7. "Girls" (Bain, Lynott, Brian Robertson) – 3:58
8. "Ode to a Black Man" – 4:04
9. "Together" – 3:37
10. "Fatalistic Attitude" – 4:28
11. "The Man's a Fool" – 2:58
12. "Old Town" (Bain, Lynott) – 3:25
13. "Cathleen" – 3:34
14. "Little Bit of Water" – 3:33
15. "Ode to Liberty (The Protest Song)" (Bain, Lynott) – 5:46
16. "Somebody Else's Dream" – 4:23
17. "Beat of the Drum" (Lynott, Jackie Daly, Johnny "Ringo" McDonagh, Brian Downey) – 3:43
18. "Nineteen" [Extended Version] – 5:26
19. "Parisienne Walkways" (Lynott, Gary Moore) – 3:20
20. "Yellow Pearl" [First version] (Lynott, Ure) – 4:06
- "Parisienne Walkways" was originally released as a Gary Moore solo track.

== Personnel ==
- Philip Lynott – bass guitar, guitar, keyboards, vocoder, drum machines, percussion, vocals
- Scott Gorham – guitar (tracks 2, 5, 8), bass guitar (track 14)
- Snowy White – guitar (tracks 2, 6)
- Mark Knopfler – guitar (tracks 3, 15)
- Gary Moore – guitar (track 19)
- Jerome Rimson – bass guitar (tracks 6, 9)
- Fiachra Trench – strings (tracks 4, 5)
- Jimmy Bain – piano, bass guitar, keyboards, string machine (tracks 7, 11, 12)
- Billy Currie – ARP synthesizer (track 7)
- Midge Ure – ARP Synthesizer, minimoog, string machine, drum machine (tracks 1, 9, 20)
- Darren Wharton – keyboards, drum machine
- Brian Downey – drums, percussion
- Mark Nauseef – drums, percussion
- Bob Benberg – drums, percussion (tracks 7, 14)
- Rusty Egan – drums (tracks 11, 12, 13)
- Andy Duncan – percussion (tracks 4, 6)
- Huey Lewis – harmonica (track 13)
- Lena – backing vocals (track 1, 7, 20)
- Julia – backing vocals (track 6)
- Sophie – backing vocals (track 7)
- Margi – backing vocals (track 7)
- Silver – backing vocals (track 7)
- Christine – backing vocals (track 7)
- Monica Lynott – backing vocals (track 13)
- Gordon Johnson – intro voice (track 12)
- Suzanne Machon – intro voice (track 13)
