= The Definitive Collection (Thin Lizzy album) =

Compilation album by Thin Lizzy
- Released: 20 June 2006
- Genre: Hard rock, blues rock
- Label: Mercury

Thin Lizzy compilation albums chronology
| Greatest Hits (2004) | The Definitive Collection (2006) | At the BBC (2011) |

Professional ratings
Review scores
| Source | Rating |
|---|---|
| AllMusic | 4.5/5 stars |

The Definitive Collection is a 2006 compilation album by hard rock band Thin Lizzy.

== Track listing ==
1. "Whiskey in the Jar"
2. "The Rocker"
3. "Still in Love with You"
4. "Showdown"
5. "Wild One"
6. "Jailbreak"
7. "The Boys Are Back in Town"
8. "Cowboy Song"
9. "Don't Believe a Word"
10. "Bad Reputation"
11. "Dancing in the Moonlight (It's Caught Me in Its Spotlight)"
12. "Rosalie/Cowgirl's Song [Live]"
13. "Do Anything You Want To"
14. "Waiting for an Alibi"
15. "Chinatown"
16. "Dedication"

== Personnel ==
- Phil Lynott – bass guitar, vocals
- Brian Downey – drums, percussion
- Eric Bell – guitar on tracks 1–2
- Gary Moore – guitar on tracks 3, 13–14
- Scott Gorham – guitar on tracks 4–16
- Brian Robertson – guitar on tracks 4–12
- Snowy White – guitar on track 15
- Darren Wharton – keyboards on track 15
- John Helliwell – saxophone on track 11
