= Vibe for Philo =

Annual memorial musical festival (2008 to 2023)

The Vibe for Philo was a one-day festival/concert that was held yearly as a tribute to Thin Lizzy frontman Phil Lynott, on 4 January, the anniversary of his death. It was first organised in 1987 by Lynott's friend Smiley Bolger who ran it to its announced conclusion in 2023. Each year a variety of musicians performed, including Thin Lizzy tribute bands as well as members of bands Phil played in and reformed versions of these bands, such as when a re-formed version of Thin Lizzy performed in 1996. Each year the festival had a title, usually drawn from that of a Thin Lizzy song. The showcase has produced some memorable performances including then unknowns such as Damien Dempsey, Paddy Casey, Leanne Hart and Conor McGouran (Xerath/The Enigma Division). Highlights are uploaded to YouTube.

The final festival, the 36th, was called "This Is the One".

== Vibe for Philo by year ==
=== 2008 - "Johnny the Fox Meets Jimmy the Weed" ===
Venue: The Button Factory
Artists/Speakers: Hoodoo Rhythm Devils, Gnasher, The Southbound Band, Tizz Lizzy, Glyder

=== 2009 - "Dancing in the Moonlight" ===
Venue: The Button Factory
Artists/Speakers: Hoodoo Rhythm Devils, The Lizzyboys, Matt & Phil (of Tizz Lizzy), John Conlon (of Thin az Lizzy), Derek Herebert, Dave McGuinness, Colm Querney, Mark Adams, Paul Toal, Robbie Bray, Richie Buckley, Emerald, Renegade, Nell Bryden

=== 2010 - "Running Back" ===
Venue: The Button Factory
Artists/Speakers: Hoodoo Rhythm Devils, Yellow Pearl, Metalita, Tupelo, Barry Whyte Band, Silverbird, Keith Grogan & John Nesbitt, The Quicksand Band, Dave Morrissey

=== 2011 - "Black Rose" ===
Venue: Vicar Street
Artists/Speakers: Eric Bell, Brian Robertson Band, Chris Laney, Hoodoo Rhythm Devils, Matt'n'Phil, The Pat McManus Band, Conor McGouran Quartet, Gnasher, Mark Dignam, Leanne Harte, Tony Powell, Glen Hansard

=== 2012 - "Are You Ready?" ===
Venue: The Button Factory
Artists/Speakers: Doish Nagle's Grand Slam, The Thin Lizzy Experience, Republic of Loose, The Low Riders, Smiles Bolger

=== 2013 - "Dublin" ===
Venue: The Button Factory
Artists/Speakers: Faither Jack, The Low Riders, Conor McGouran and The Harley's, The Thin Lizzy Experience, Dubh Linn Boys

=== 2014 - "Fight or Fall" ===
Venue: Vicar Street
Artists/Speakers: Smiles Bolger, Brenny Bonass & Shea Fitzgerald, The Lizzy Experience, Sal Vitro, Pat Coldrick & Dick Farrelly, The Low Riders, Philomena Lynott, Dizzy Lizzy

=== 2015 - "Get Out Of Here" ===
Venue: Vicar Street
Artists/Speakers: Pat McManus, The Low Riders, Bad Reputation, The Dark Lanes, Conor Scott, The Barley Mob, The Dunford Brothers

=== 2016 - "The Sun Goes Down" ===
Venue: Vicar Street
Artists/Speakers: Eric Bell Trio, Brian Downey, The Soul Brothers, The Low Riders, Parris, The Hoodoos feat. John Conton, Mongoose, Fiach Moriarty
