= Killer on the Loose =

- UK single sleeve artwork by Jim Fitzpatrick

Single by Thin Lizzy

from the album Chinatown
- B-side: "Don't Play Around"
- Released: September 1980
- Recorded: 1980
- Genre: Hard rock; heavy metal
- Length: 3:55
- Label: Vertigo
- Songwriter(s): Phil Lynott
- Producer(s): Kit Woolven and Thin Lizzy

"Killer on the Loose" is a song by Irish rock band Thin Lizzy, released as a single in September 1980. It was written by Phil Lynott, and is from their 1980 album Chinatown. The song was a chart hit, peaking at No. 10 on the UK Singles Chart, and No. 5 on the Irish Singles Chart.

== Controversy ==
The song, in which Lynott took the persona of Jack the Ripper, received much controversy. The single was released amidst the Yorkshire Ripper murders and many members of the British public, largely women, were outraged by the song's lyrics and its references to the Ripper. A music video, in which Lynott is dressed in a Ripper style trench coat surrounded by scantily clad women, generated even more controversy when it was released in 1980.

== Personnel ==
- Phil Lynott – bass guitar, vocals
- Scott Gorham – lead and rhythm guitar
- Snowy White – lead and rhythm guitar
- Darren Wharton – keyboards
- Brian Downey – drums

== Charts ==
| Chart (1980) | Peak position |
|---|---|
| Ireland (IRMA) | 5 |
| UK Singles (OCC) | 10 |
