= Chinatown (Thin Lizzy album) =

- Cover art by Jim Fitzpatrick

Studio album by Thin Lizzy
- Released: 10 October 1980
- Recorded: April–August 1980
- Studio: Good Earth Studios, London
- Genre: Hard rock
- Length: 41:02
- Label: Vertigo; Mercury (Canada); Warner Bros. (US)
- Producer: Thin Lizzy and Kit Woolven

Thin Lizzy chronology
Black Rose: A Rock Legend (1979)	Chinatown (1980)	Renegade (1981)

Chinatown is the tenth studio album by Irish band Thin Lizzy, released in 1980. It introduced guitarist Snowy White who would also perform on the next album as well as tour with Thin Lizzy between 1980 and 1982; he replaced Gary Moore as permanent guitarist. White had previously worked with Cliff Richard, Peter Green and Pink Floyd. Chinatown also featured eighteen-year-old Darren Wharton on keyboards, and he joined Thin Lizzy as a permanent member later that year.

== Recording ==
Having recruited new guitarist Snowy White just before Christmas 1979, Thin Lizzy began recording sessions at Good Earth Studios for what would become the Chinatown album in January 1980, and finished recording "Dear Miss Lonely Hearts" (co-written with Jimmy Bain) in early February. This song was not considered for the album and was instead used for Phil Lynott's debut solo album Solo in Soho, despite all the musicians playing on the song (and ultimately appearing in the video) being members of Thin Lizzy. Between March and May, the band worked on more songs, including "Lady Killer on the Loose", "The Sacred Sweetheart" and the title track "Chinatown", the latter two of which were also performed live at this time, at shows in Ireland and Scandinavia. Another song which had already been played live was "Didn't I", on the recent Japanese tour with temporary guitarist Dave Flett in the band.

The co-producer on the album was Kit Woolven, who was employed by Thin Lizzy's previous producer, Tony Visconti. New keyboard player Darren Wharton later described Woolven as a "really nice guy, easy-going, diplomatic type of guy", and a "really good engineer". Wharton also described how Woolven acted as a guide for Lynott in terms of production, rather than either man producing the album himself. Woolven described the recording as "hard to do" due to Lynott's tendency to make up ideas on the spot rather than undertake any pre-production work. He also stated that this made it harder for new guitarist White, who was used to a more regimented style of working. Bass guitarist Jerome Rimson, who worked on Lynott's solo albums, described the scene in the studio: "I watched him [Lynott] record most of the Chinatown album standing at the microphone and making up the words as he was standing there. There was a full-blown party going on in the control room."

Midge Ure had been performing live with the band up to this point, but left after the Scandinavian shows in April. The band reconvened at Good Earth to continue work on the album, but soon had to relocate to RAK Studios when more time at Good Earth became unavailable. It was there that the band met teenage keyboard player Wharton, who had been recommended to Lynott by a friend in Manchester. Wharton travelled to London for an audition in the form of a loose jam, but the band were too busy finishing "Chinatown", which was to be released as a single in May. He returned the following week, having learned all the band's material, and was hired on a temporary basis. Promotional videos were recorded for "Chinatown" and the completed "Killer on the Loose" around the same time, without Wharton. These were directed by David Mallet, with whom the band had worked on videos for the previous album Black Rose: A Rock Legend, at Hewitt Studios in London.

Recording was subsequently delayed by more touring, and some shows were recorded to provide material for a potential live album, although most of it was used for B-sides and an EP, Killers Live. By mid-June, the band returned to Good Earth to complete Chinatown, although it was still unclear which songs would be featured. By July, a preliminary running order had been established for the album. Side one featured "Chinatown", "We Will Be Strong", "Didn't I", "Turn Around" and "Killer on the Loose". Side two consisted of "Hey You, You Got It Made", "Having a Good Time", "Sweetheart", "The Act", "The Story of My Life" and "Sugar Blues".

Two of the songs which had been worked on were ultimately considered unsuitable for the album: "The Act" (also known as "It's Going Wrong") and "The Story of My Life". The former was eventually re-recorded and finished for Lynott's second solo album, The Philip Lynott Album, as "Don't Talk About Me Baby", while "The Story of My Life" with lead guitar by White remained unfinished. Another song, "Turn Around", which had been played during soundchecks for live shows, was completed as "Don't Play Around", and was used as the B-side of the "Killer on the Loose" single instead of being included on the album. A soundcheck recording of the song appeared on the expanded version of the album, released in 2011. In August, having decided that these three songs would not be included, the band decided to reduce the number of tracks on the album rather than write and record new material. The only new song brought in at this time was "Genocide (The Killing of the Buffalo)".

The finished album opened with "We Will Be Strong", which was released in the US as a single, albeit without a promotional video. "Chinatown" followed, based on ideas by new member White and a bass exercise shown to Lynott by Brush Shiels, and completed by the whole band, with drummer Brian Downey adding double bass drum fills. "Sweetheart" (renamed from "The Sacred Sweetheart") featured keyboards by Wharton, while "Sugar Blues" was another band collaboration which strongly featured White. Side one closed with "Killer on the Loose", which attracted attention from the press amid the ongoing murders and attacks on women by the Yorkshire Ripper, particularly when the song was released as a single in September. The song was a hit, reaching number 10 in the UK charts, despite the record company failing to press sufficient records to meet demand.

Side two opened with "Having a Good Time", followed by "Genocide (The Killing of the Buffalo)", which Lynott wrote with the help of Thin Lizzy artist Jim Fitzpatrick, who also designed the cover for the album. Fitzpatrick did not contribute to the lyrics but assisted in maintaining the historical accuracy of Lynott's theme of the slaughter of American bison in the 19th century, and its effects on the Plains Indians people. Fitzpatrick was unhappy with the lyrics, and Lynott's lyrics in general: "I felt [they] deteriorated horrendously. His mind wasn't making the connections it used to make." "Didn't I" was completed with the help of Tim Hinkley, who added piano parts, and Fiachra Trench, who provided string arrangements. Hinkley had previously added keyboards to "Running Back" on the Jailbreak album in 1976, and Trench had worked on Johnny the Fox, also in 1976, as well as Vagabonds of the Western World in 1973. Trench also worked on Lynott's solo albums, and said "Didn't I" ultimately "could've gone either way, Lizzy or solo". Chinatown closed with "Hey You", a collaboration between Lynott and Downey, the song's title having been shortened.

== Cover ==
The cover for the album was designed by regular band artist Jim Fitzpatrick, who drew many sketches for Lynott's approval. One featured a dragon with flames emanating from it, in a "Chinese type of pagoda style", which Lynott liked. Fitzpatrick developed the theme and finished the front cover. There was another piece in a similar style on the back, which Fitzpatrick finished and sent to the record company directly. "They loved it..." he later said. "One of my best pieces of work. It's why I want it back, right? If it ever turns up anywhere."

== Reception ==
Professional ratings
Review scores
Source	Rating
AllMusic	3/5 stars
The Collector's Guide to Heavy Metal	8/10

Greg Prato of AllMusic described Chinatown as a "letdown" compared to the previous album Black Rose: A Rock Legend, blaming the absence of Gary Moore and producer Tony Visconti, and the drug problems experienced by Phil Lynott and Scott Gorham. Prato praised side one as containing the best material, including the "anthemic" "We Will Be Strong", and the "pop perfection" of "Sweetheart". However, he described side two as "comprised almost entirely of bland filler", although he believed that Chinatown was "not their worst album". Canadian journalist Martin Popoff wrote that "although comprising some spirited tunes, (...) lyrically and thematically the songs seem forced and all too topical" and "the overall level of quality below Lizzy's soulful standards", with Snowy White "more a studied session man" than a new band member.

Guitarist White later described the album as "pretty strong", although it was in need of more work. He was frustrated at what he saw as wasted time in the studio, and also stated that some guitar ideas he recorded while waiting for the band were subsequently wiped at Lynott's instructions without listening to them. Co-producer Kit Woolven felt the album could have been more "rock 'n' roll": "It needed a Robbo or someone like that in there," he said. Woolven also described the increasing substance abuse within the band as a problem.

Gorham himself described Chinatown as "kind of a strange album", and cited his increasing drug use as a reason why the album was "a tough album to actually get through", adding that he does not remember recording some of the material. Drummer Brian Downey remembered, "There's some great tracks on both [Chinatown and the follow-up Renegade], but Phil's songwriting seemed to be slipping a bit. All that pressure was getting to him and the drugs were starting to take effect... For some reason we were becoming a little bit unfashionable as well." Gorham added, "We realised that at this point we weren't actually getting any bigger."

== Track listings ==
Side one
No.	Title	Writer(s)	Length
1.	"We Will Be Strong"	Phil Lynott	5:11
2.	"Chinatown"	Brian Downey, Scott Gorham, Lynott, Snowy White	4:43
3.	"Sweetheart"	Lynott	3:29
4.	"Sugar Blues"	Downey, Gorham, Lynott, White	4:22
5.	"Killer on the Loose"	Lynott	3:55

Side two
No.	Title	Writer(s)	Length
6.	"Having a Good Time"	Lynott, White	4:38
7.	"Genocide (The Killing of the Buffalo)"	Lynott	5:06
8.	"Didn't I"	Lynott	4:28
9.	"Hey You"	Downey, Lynott	5:09

=== Deluxe edition ===
A new remastered and expanded edition of Chinatown was released on 27 June 2011. This new edition is a 2-CD set, with the original album on disc one, and bonus material on disc two.

Disc two
No.	Title	Writer(s)	Length
1.	"Don't Play Around" (B-side of "Killer on the Loose" single)	Gorham, Lynott	3:09
2.	"We Will Be Strong" (Single version)		4:10
3.	"Sugar Blues" (live at Cork City Hall, 13 April 1980)		5:39
4.	"Whiskey in the Jar" (live at Cork City Hall, 13 April 1980)	traditional	5:47
5.	"Are You Ready" (live at RDS Hall, Dublin, Ireland, 7 June 1980)	Gorham, Downey, Brian Robertson, Lynott	3:10
6.	"Chinatown" (live at RDS Hall, Dublin, Ireland, 7 June 1980)		5:06
7.	"Got to Give It Up" (live at RDS Hall, Dublin, Ireland, 7 June 1980)	Lynott, Gorham	6:07
8.	"Dear Miss Lonely Hearts" (live at RDS Hall, Dublin, Ireland, 7 June 1980)	Jimmy Bain, Lynott	5:24
9.	"Killer on the Loose" (live at Hammersmith Odeon, London, 26 November 1981)		5:39
10.	"Chinatown" (edited version)		3:40
11.	"Chinatown" (soundcheck, Cork, 1980)		4:50
12.	"Don't Play Around" (soundcheck, Hammersmith Odeon, 1980)		3:57
13.	"Sweetheart" (soundcheck, Hammersmith Odeon, 1980)		4:22
14.	"Didn't I" (soundcheck, Cork, 1980)		5:56
15.	"Hey You" (soundcheck, Cork, 1980)		6:46
Total length:			73:42

- Track 3 originally issued as a B-side on the "Chinatown" single.
- Track 4 originally issued as a B-side on Phil Lynott's "Nineteen" single.
- Tracks 5 and 8 originally issued on the Killers Live EP.
- Tracks 6–7 originally issued as B-sides on the "Killer on the Loose" single.
- Track 9 originally included as bonus track on double LP and cassette versions of the Thunder and Lightning album.
- Tracks 11–15 previously unreleased.

== Singles ==
- "Chinatown" / "Sugar Blues" (live) – 16 May 1980
- "Killer on the Loose" / "Don't Play Around" (Gorham, Lynott) – 9 September 1980

A double single pack was also released, with the other disc featuring "Got to Give It Up" (live) / "Chinatown" (live).
In the US, the B-side was "Sugar Blues".

- "We Will Be Strong" / "Sweetheart" (US only)
- "Hey You" / Killer on the Loose" – 6 January 1981 (Germany only)

== Personnel ==
=== Thin Lizzy ===
- Phil Lynott – bass guitar, keyboards, lead vocals
- Scott Gorham – lead and rhythm guitar, backing vocals
- Snowy White – lead and rhythm guitar
- Brian Downey – drums, percussion

=== Additional musicians ===
- Darren Wharton – keyboards, backing vocals
- Midge Ure – backing vocals on "Chinatown"
- Tim Hinkley – electric piano on "Didn't I"
- Fiachra Trench – string arrangement on "Didn't I"

=== Production ===
- Kit Woolven – producer, engineer
- Gordon Fordyce – assistant engineer
- Ian Cooper – mastering

== Charts ==
Chart (1980)	Peak position
Australian Albums (Kent Music Report)	16
New Zealand Albums (RMNZ)	31
Norwegian Albums (VG-lista)	20
Swedish Albums (Sverigetopplistan)	13
UK Albums (Official Charts)	7
US Billboard 200	120

== Certifications ==
Region	Certification	Certified units/sales
United Kingdom (BPI)	Silver	60,000^{^}
^{^} Shipments figures based on certification alone.
