= Roger Collins (disambiguation) =

Roger Collins (born 1949) is an English medievalist, and honorary fellow in history at the University of Edinburgh.

Roger Collins may also refer to:

- Roger Collins (Dark Shadows), a fictional character from the Dark Shadows franchise
- Roger Collins (Sweet Valley High), a fictional character from the Sweet Valley High novel series

== See also ==
- Rodger Collins
