= Paul Daly (sculptor) =

Irish sculptor and designer

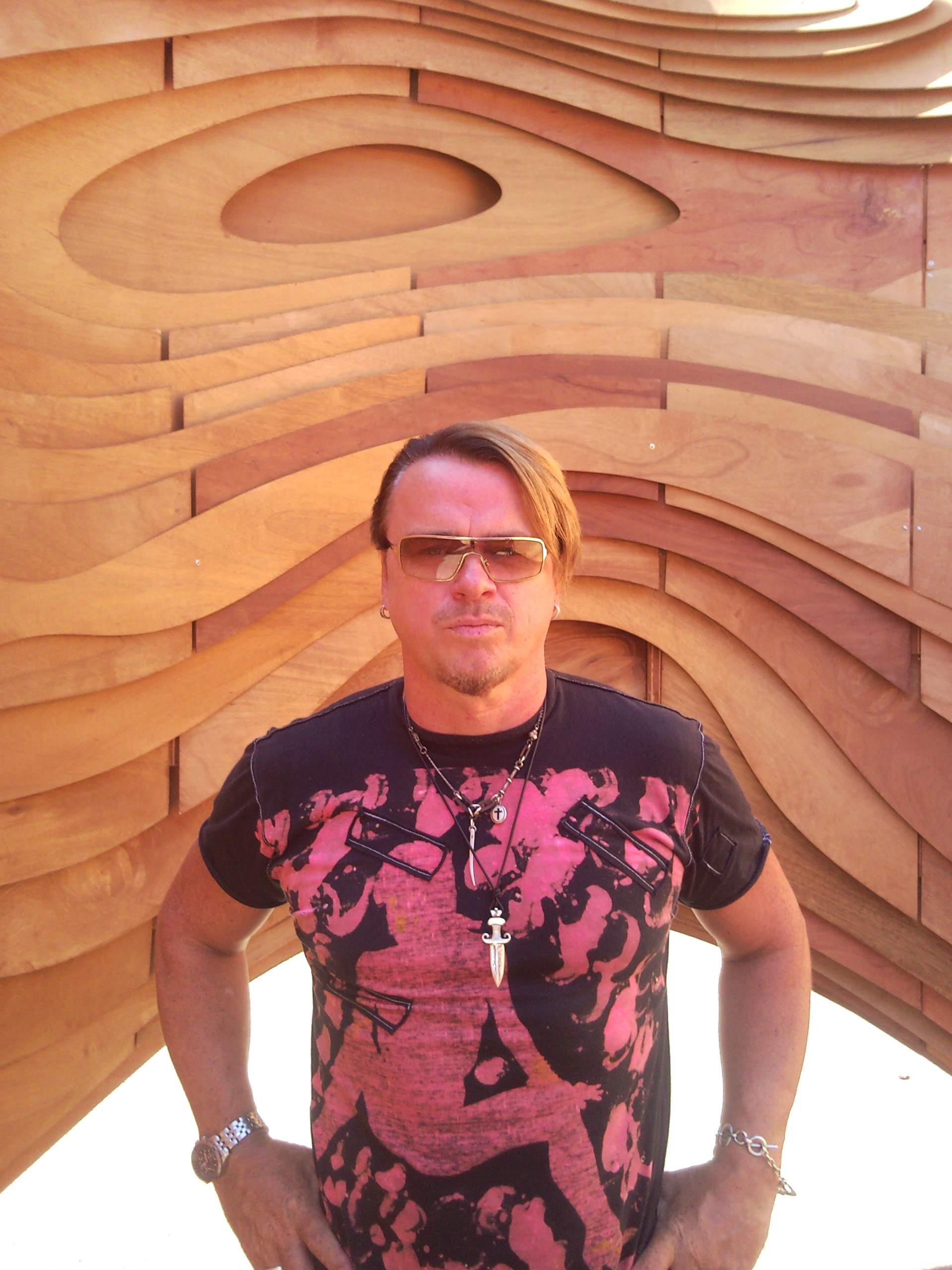
Paul Daly

Paul Daly is an Irish sculptor and designer, currently based in London's East End.

Daly was born in Raheny, Dublin in 1963. His father Tom was an artist and Daly is a self-taught artist. He left school at age 15 and sold his first painting in a Dublin art gallery in the same year.

== Early life ==
Originally hailing from Dublin, Paul spent the 1970s in Zambia, Zimbabwe and Ghana – an eclectic upbringing that would later influence his design work. His early working life spanned the music industry, as a singer in a band, metal work, shipbuilding, and the fashion industry. Paul's career in design began shortly after the completion of his studies with a foundation course in fashion at The National College of Art and Design in Dublin, followed by a BA degree at Goldsmiths College, London in the mid-1980s. Daly's graduation year was shared by other noteworthy names in the design industry, including Gary Hume, Sarah Lucas and Fiona Rae.

In 1987, Paul moved to Manhattan, working with many recognised artists and designers. It was here he founded his own business, designing and creating functional furniture such as tables, chairs and doors. He also worked with Sullivan Bluth Studios for a few years. He worked on two animated films, An American Tale and The Land Before Time.

== Design Work ==
Paul returned to London in 1988 and set up his own Design Studio and Workshop. The first club project embarked upon by Daly came in the form of Ri Ra, a Dublin venue, in 1993. The same period saw Paul work with U2 on their ‘Zoo TV’ tour. In 1994, work commenced on The Elbow Room in Westbourne Grove – a venue that fused modern design concepts with the humble pool club. It was here that Paul first met fashion designer Ozwald Boateng. This chance encounter led to Paul designing Boateng's Savile Row showroom in 1995. Following this high-profile commission, Daly's volume of work increased dramatically: the following year saw Paul commence work on B Square, Saint, and U2's Pop Mart tour. Since this period in the mid-90s, the focus of his studio has remained largely on design work for the bar and restaurant scene.

== Design work to date ==
Design work to date:

1988-1993 Various private furniture and sculpture commissions

- 1993 props for large world tour for U2 called Zoo TV
- 1993 Rí – Rá nightclub, Dublin, Ireland
- 1994 Furniture for Kartouche, restaurant on Fulham Road
- 1994 The Elbow Room in Notting Hill, first outlet of the UK's leading chain of pool bars. Also a founding director and a shareholder.
- 1994 Set props for Pinewood Studios – Judge Dredd
- 1995 Ozwald Boateng's first bespoke tailoring outlet on Savile Row, London.
- 1995 Saint for Eric Yu; bar/restaurant/nightclub in Covent Garden/Leicester Square, London
- 1995 B Square, bar – restaurant in Battersea Square
- 1996 VIP lounge in Hanover Grand, a nightclub for Piers Adams and David Phelps. Also designed a show in Milan Furniture Fair.
- 1996 Kassoulet, restaurant in Notting Hill
- 1997 The Elbow Room, second venue in Leeds. Group Furniture show in Selfridges.
- 1998 LAB (Douglas Ankrah) on Old Compton Street, London.
- 1998 Chase for Ultimate Leisure in Newcastle, England. Second show in Milan Furniture Fair.
- 1999 Nude, restaurant/deli and brand for Bono and his brother Norman Hewson in Suffolk Street, Dublin. Followed by 4 more sites in the city including Dublin Airport
- 1999 Cut for Ultimate Leisure in Newcastle, England
- 1999 Time for Ultimate Leisure in Whitley Bay. First solo furniture show in Tokyo and Osaka, Japan
- 2000 The Sea for Ultimate Leisure in Newcastle, England
- 2000 The Elbow Room, third venue in Islington, London
- 2001 The London Connection, day centre for young homeless people (up to 25 years old). Designed at cost.
- 2001 Love in Oxford
- 2001 Four venues for Mitchells and Butlers: The Vintry in St Albans, Black in Glasgow, Stones in Birmingham, The Lounge in Birmingham. Second furniture show in Japan with Tom Dixon
- 2001 The Hill (Robert Newmark) on Haverstock Hill, London
- 2001 The Elbow Room, fourth venue in Bristol, England
- 2001 Loop, bar – grill – lap-dancing venue in Bridlington
- 2001 Lowlife, bar – restaurant in Baker Street, London
- 2001 Fish in Borough Market and Locale (Tony Allen) on Munster Road, London
- 2001 Residential apartment in Barbican for Yun Wei Chu featured on Channel 4 Grand Designs
- 2002 The Elbow Room, fifth venue in Shoreditch, London
- 2002 Mission, purpose-built bar-restaurant-nightclub in Great Yarmouth
- 2002 Jam Factory Show Apartment in Bermondsey, London
- 2002 Offices for Exposure PR accounts department, Little Portland Street, London
- 2003 Harlem (Arthur Baker) in Notting Hill Gate, London
- 2003 Salvador and Amanda (The Breakfast Group), Newport Street, London
- 2003 Zigfrid (Paul Daly) in Hoxton Square, London
- 2004 Barbican Penthouse (private client) in London
- 2004 Hoxton Apprentice (Training for Life, charity) in Hoxton Square, London. Designed at cost.
- 2005 Underbelly, design and build, (Paul Daly) in Hoxton Square, London
- 2005 Statue of Phil Lynott on Harry Street, Dublin
- 2005 Three Revolution Bars (Inventive Leisure) in Bristol, Manchester, Leeds
- 2005 Brown Sugar (Loftcat Leisure) in Holborn, London
- 2005 Marketing suite (Treasury Holdings) for Spencer Dock Development, Dublin, Ireland
- 2006 Sienna restaurant in Stevenage, England
- 2006 Main bar for the Bar Show (Theme Magazine)
- 2007 Bison & Bird (Mint Grop) on Clapham High Street, London
- 2007 Mary Janes (Mint Group), The Minories, London
- 2007 13 x Penthouses (Treasury Holdings) in Spencer Dock, Dublin
- 2008 Roadtrip, design and build (Paul Daly), Old Street, London
- 2008 Locale (Locale Restaurant Group), Italian Restaurant in East Dulwich, London
- 2008 Vendôme (Freddie Frampton), nightclub in Mayfair, London. Winner of London Bar and Club Best Design Award. 2008 Villiers Terrace, Bar & Dining Rooms in Crouch End, London
- 2009 Miss Qs Saloon Pool Bar in Earls Court, London, design and build2009 59 Private Club/Bar in Shoreditch, London
- 2010 Full house design in Hampstead, London (private client, ongoing)
- 2010 The Workshop, design and build (Paul Daly), Old Street, London

== Hospitality Business ==
In 2003, Paul Daly opened his first bar, Zigfrid, in London's Hoxton Square, expanding it to incorporate a basement bar, Underbelly, in 2005. The success of these first forays into hospitality was closely followed by the opening of his third venue, Roadtrip, on nearby Old Street in 2008, which serves as the most recent project in his own venue portfolio. However, he has continued to take commissions for outside work, and in 2009 his design for Mayfair nightclub 'Vendome' won Best Designed Venue at the London Club and Bar Awards.
