= Funky Junction =

Irish rock band (1972)

- Also known as: The Rock Machine
- Origin: Ireland
- Genre: Rock
- Years active: 1972
- Label: Stereo Gold Award
- Past members: Phil Lynott; Eric Bell; Brian Downey; Benny White; Dave Lennox

Funky Junction were an Irish rock band formed in 1972 specifically to record a single album of songs made famous by British band Deep Purple, which was released as Funky Junction Play a Tribute to Deep Purple in January 1973. Among the band's lineup were all three members of the early 1970s incarnation of Thin Lizzy.

== Background ==
The project was brought about by a German businessman named Leo Muller, who contacted Irish group Thin Lizzy to record the album. Muller was an alias used by Dave Miller, a record producer and proprietor of several budget music companies. The group members were not enthusiastic, as they were trying to forge their own style and identity, but they needed the money.

Thin Lizzy's vocalist, Phil Lynott, decided that he was unable to sing like Deep Purple vocalist Ian Gillan, so restricted himself to playing bass guitar and singing backing vocals. The band brought in Benny White, singer with the Dublin group Elmer Fudd, because they generally performed Deep Purple covers during gigs. Thin Lizzy drummer Brian Downey referred to White as "really an Ian Gillan clone". Thin Lizzy did not have a keyboard player in their lineup, so Elmer Fudd's keyboardist Dave "Mojo" Lennox, later in Blodwyn Pig, was also asked to participate. Thin Lizzy guitarist Eric Bell stated that White and Lennox were each paid "around £60" to travel to De Lane Lea Studios in London to record the album.

== Recording ==
The makeshift band rehearsed for "two or three hours", according to Downey, before recording the whole album in one day. Nine tracks were recorded, with five being Deep Purple covers. Three others were loosely improvised instrumentals; "Dan" – a version of "Londonderry Air" or "Danny Boy" by Bell in a Jimi Hendrix style; "Rising Sun" – a cover of "The House of the Rising Sun" made popular by The Animals; and the original composition "Palamatoon". The last track on the album was "Corina", credited to Leo Muller, as were the other non-Deep Purple songs.

The album was released in the UK and the USA on the Stereo Gold Award label, and on the Sonic Records label in Germany. For the German release, the band's name was changed to "The Rock Machine" with the album title being changed to "The Rock Machine Play the Best of Deep Purple". In its original edition, the album was available at Woolworths for 50p.

Thin Lizzy were paid £1000 for the recording but their name was entirely omitted from the album, and a photo of a different band was featured on the cover, namely Hard Stuff, who were signed to Deep Purple's own label.

=== Especially for You... ===
Another album was released by Muller in 1973 using the Funky Junction name, titled Especially for You..., credited to Gladys Knight & the Pips featuring Funky Junction, also on the Stereo Gold Award label. However, Gladys Knight & the Pips did not perform on the record, and the two tracks credited to Funky Junction, "Talking Trash" and "Road's End", were recorded by an entirely different band and did not involve Lynott, Bell, Downey, White or Lennox.

== Funky Junction Play a Tribute to Deep Purple ==
=== Album track listing ===
1. "Fireball" (Ritchie Blackmore, Ian Gillan, Roger Glover, Jon Lord, Ian Paice)
2. "Dan" (Leo Muller)
3. "Black Night" (Blackmore, Gillan, Glover, Lord, Paice)
4. "Palamatoon" (Muller)
5. "Strange Kind of Woman" (Blackmore, Gillan, Glover, Lord, Paice)
6. "Hush" (Joe South)
7. "Rising Sun" (Muller)
8. "Speed King" (Blackmore, Gillan, Glover, Lord, Paice)
9. "Corina" (Muller)

=== Personnel ===
- Eric Bell – guitar
- Phil Lynott – bass guitar
- Brian Downey – drums
- Benny White – vocals
- Dave Lennox – keyboards
