= King's Call =

1980 song by Phil Lynott

Single by Phil Lynott

from the album Solo in Soho
- B-side: "Ode to a Black Man"
- Released: 13 June 1980
- Length: 3:38
- Label: Vertigo
- Songwriter: Phil Lynott
- Producers: Phil Lynott; Kit Woolven

Phil Lynott singles chronology
"Dear Miss Lonely Hearts" (1980)	"King's Call" (1980)	"Yellow Pearl" (1981)

Music video
- "King's Call" on YouTube

Alternative cover
- 1987 reissue

"King's Call" is a song by Irish singer and musician Phil Lynott, released by Vertigo Records on 13 June 1980 as the second single from his debut solo studio album, Solo in Soho (1980). The song was written by Lynott, and was produced by Lynott and Kit Woolven. It features Dire Straits guitarist Mark Knopfler and Thin Lizzy drummer Brian Downey. "King's Call" reached number 20 in the Irish Singles Chart and number 35 in the UK singles chart. A reissue in 1987 saw the single re-enter the charts, peaking at number 7 in Ireland and number 68 in the UK.

== Writing ==
"King's Call" was written as a tribute to Elvis Presley and recounts how Lynott reacted to the news of his death in 1977. As one of his musical heroes, Lynott was greatly affected by Presley's death; Thin Lizzy drummer Brian Downey recalled how Lynott phoned him crying right after the news broke. In a 1980 interview with the Daily Record, Lynott said: "I loved Elvis. He was the first rock 'n' roller to be rebellious. When he died even those tacky Elvis songs became great as far as I was concerned. And like I sing on the song, I just went out and got sloshed when I heard of his death."

== Recording ==
The song was recorded with Mark Knopfler of Dire Straits on lead guitar and Thin Lizzy drummer Brian Downey on drums. Lynott played rhythm and bass guitar.

== Release ==
"King's Call" was released by Vertigo Records in the UK and Ireland on 13 June 1980. The record company had high expectations for the commercial potential of "King's Call". Alan Phillips, the Product Manager at Phonogram (the parent company of Vertigo) later recalled: "We really did think 'King's Call' was going to be a hit. When it relatively flopped, I think one or two people began to have sneaking doubts about the whole Philip Lynott solo idea."

On 9 January 1987, to mark the first anniversary of Lynott's death, Vertigo reissued "King's Call" in the UK and Ireland. Thin Lizzy manager Chris Morrison told the press at the time: "The decision not to release a record until now was a deliberate one on the part of the management and record company. We very much wanted people to remember him for his work with Thin Lizzy and his enormous contribution to music in general, and not for the tragic way in which he died. To this end we felt it important that a period of time elapsed after Phil's death before this timely tribute."

== Music video ==
Mark Knopfler appeared in the accompanying music video.

== Critical reception ==
Upon its release, Chris Westwood of Record Mirror described "King's Call" as "heavy-lidded Lynott: one of those smarmy, balladic things he loves so much". He noted Mark Knopfler's "sliding soporific guitar all over this" and predicted the song would be a hit. In the US, Billboard called it a "Dire Straits like rocker" and added that Lynott "should score with AOR and top 40 formats with this subtle, seductive original". Cash Box noted that the "mid-tempo, story-like song is melodic in deep harmonies and articulate in guitar licks in the manner of Dire Straits". Record World believed that the "ominous-sounding pop-rocker", on which Lynott "gets Knopfler's distinctive lead guitar help", "will catch AOR attention".

In a review of the 1987 reissue, Howard Johnson, writing for Kerrang!, praised it as a "fine tribute to Phil, who was essentially a major rock talent". Robin Smith of Record Mirror described it as a "memorable song". William Shaw of Smash Hits called it a "doomy, lugubrious 'tribute' to Presley" and added that he "suspect[ed] the posthumous single [to be] a bit of a cash in".

== Track listings ==
7–inch single (1980) (UK, Ireland, Europe, Australasia, South Africa, and US)

1. "King's Call" – 3:38
2. "Ode to a Black Man" – 4:11

7–inch single (1987 reissue) (UK and Ireland)

1. "King's Call" – 3:38
2. "Yellow Pearl" – 3:21

12–inch single (1987 reissue) (UK and Ireland)

1. "King's Call" – 3:38
2. "Yellow Pearl" – 3:21
3. "Dear Miss Lonely Hearts" (live) – 5:10

== Personnel ==
"King's Call"

- Phil Lynott – vocals, rhythm guitar, bass guitar
- Mark Knopfler – lead guitar
- Brian Downey – drums

Production

- Phil Lynott – production
- Kit Woolven – production
- Midge Ure – remixing ("Yellow Pearl")

Other

- John Swannell – photography (1987 reissue)
- Satori – artwork and design (1987 reissue)

== Charts ==
Chart (1980)	Peak position
Australia (Kent Music Report)	82
Ireland (IRMA)	20
UK Singles (Official Charts)	35

=== 1987 reissue ===
Chart (1987)	Peak position
Netherlands (Dutch Top 40)	20
Netherlands (Single Top 100)	38
Ireland (IRMA)	7
UK Singles (Official Charts)	68
UK Heavy Metal Singles (Spotlight Research)	6
