= Hoodoo Rhythm Devils =

American blues-funk band

The Hoodoo Rhythm Devils were an American blues-funk band from San Francisco, California, United States, formed in 1970.

== History ==
In 1970, John Rewind was teaching guitar at Roger Calkins Music on Market Street in San Francisco. One of his students, Lee Humphries, kept telling Rewind about the talents of his friend Joe Crane, with whom he was in the Coast Guard. Crane played bass with Johnny and Edgar Winter in high school in Conroe, Texas, and had been produced by Huey Meaux. Between Humpries's description, and confirmation from Al Amis, who also worked at Roger Calkins and had heard Crane sing, Rewind went to the Alameda, California, Coast Guard Officer's Club to see Crane perform, and the Hoodoo Rhythm Devils were born. Another one of Rewind's guitar students, "Funky Jack" Leahy, who lived up the street from Rewind in the Haight-Ashbury district, had closed his poster business Funky Features, and was getting into recording and building a recording studio. When Leahy heard Crane and Rewind, he took the lead and started recording the band and making connections for them to get a recording contract with a major record label. After a few personnel changes, Glenn Walter, who had played drums in a band called The Zoo and released a single in St. Louis, Missouri, with Rewind during the 1960s, joined the band, along with Richard Greene (aka Dexter C. Plates) on bass. Greene had played in groups around the Washington, D.C. area, most notably with Roberta Flack.

Modeled after the names of bands in the 1950s, Joe Crane and his Hoodoo Rhythm Devils signed with Capitol Records under the direction of Michael Sunday and Jack Leahy, and made their first record Rack Jobber's Rule in 1971. The name was too big of a mouthful, so it was shortened to the Hoodoo Rhythm Devils. Roger Allen Clark, fresh from the Steve Miller Band, was added on drums with the second album, The Barbecue of DeVille on Blue Thumb Records in 1972. The Hoodoos toured extensively that year playing with Savoy Brown, The Doobie Brothers, Steely Dan, Chuck Berry, John Lee Hooker, Graham Central Station, Tower of Power, Mott the Hoople, Bloodrock, and The Tubes. Clark left to become a studio session drummer working for Rick Hall in Muscle Shoals, Alabama. Keith Knudsen, formerly of Lee Michaels' band and later the Doobie Brothers, then joined for a short stint on drums from late 1972 to mid 1973 before Jerome Kimsey joined the band for the recording of their third album, What the Kids Want, for Blue Thumb Records in 1973. The Hoodoos continued to tour the United States and Crane began having some of his songs covered by Johnny Winter, The Chambers Brothers, Rodger Collins, and Patti LaBelle.

In 1973, Greene left to become an audio engineer at Russian Hill Recording in San Francisco, and was the "Fall Into The Gap" voice. Roger Stanton replaced Greene on bass. 1973 and 1974 saw non-stop touring and took the band from Canada to Texas, California and Florida. The band went their separate ways in 1974, only to reform a year later with a new line-up and recorded the Lost Album that was not released until 2012. Jack Leahy and Bob Simmons of KSAN-FM in San Francisco formed World Records, and recorded, produced, and released the album Safe In Their Homes in 1976. Fantasy Records in Berkeley, California, re-released Safe in Their Homes. In 1978, Crane and Walters, recorded their second Fantasy Records album All Kidding Aside, which was produced by Clayton Ivey and Terry Woodford. It included guest musicians including Muscle Shoals Horns, Roger Allen Clark, Tom Roady and others. The band continued on until Crane died from leukemia in 1980.

After the band's demise, several compilations were released by Rear Window Music. In 2013, the Hoodoo Rhythm Devils released a live recording recorded at Ultrasonic Studios in Hempstead, New York on November 28, 1972, that had been broadcast live on WLIR-FM. In 2014 they released One Night Only, a CD which featured some jams with Johnny Winter and a live recording of the Texas Day Special with the Pointer Sisters that had been broadcast live on KSAN-FM from San Francisco in 1973. 2016 brought The Best Of The Hoodoo Rhythm Devils Volume II CD that featured a variety of unreleased tunes, demos, and a reunion tune with surviving members and their children. The album also featured Tower of Power, The Pointer Sisters, Norton Buffalo, Greg Douglass, John McFee, and the Two Tons of Fun - Martha Wash and the late Izora Armstead.

Glenn Walters has carried on as fixture vocalist and drummer in the San Francisco area, known in the advertising business with his Taco Bell, Blue Diamond Almonds, Selix Tuxedos, etc., spots, and gigs regularly with the Glenn Walters Quartet and with Sidepocket, a cover band that performs for weddings and other social events. Greene is a member of The Bobs, the Grammy Award-winning a capella group. Rewind continues as a producer, guitarist, and songwriter for Rear Window Music, producing recordings with Georgia Whiting, Davey Pattison, Bobby Black, and many others. Clark currently tours with Travis Wammack in the Muscle Shoals and Nashville area.

== Discography ==
=== Albums ===
- Rack Jobbers Rule (1971), Capitol
- The Barbecue of DeVille (1972), Blue Thumb
- What the Kids Want (1973), Blue Thumb
- Safe in Their Homes (1976), Fantasy
- All Kidding Aside (1978), Fantasy

=== Compilation albums ===
- The Best of the Hoodoo Rhythm Devils (2002) Gazebertz Records
- The Best of The Hoodoo Rhythm Devils-Volume I (Reissue) (2012) Rear Window Music
- The Lost Album (2012) Rear Window Music
- Live From New York 1972 (2012) Rear Window Music
- One Night Only (2014) Rear Window Music
- The Best Of The Hoodoo Rhythm Devils-Volume II (2016) Rear Window Music
