= Yellow Pearl (song) =

Single by Phil Lynott

from the album Solo in Soho (original) and The Philip Lynott Album (remix)
- B-side: "Girls"
- Released: 13 March 1981; December 1981 (7" remix)
- Genre: Synthpop
- Length: 4:06; 2:58 (7" remix); 4:29 (12" remix)
- Label: Vertigo; Virgin
- Songwriters: Phil Lynott, Midge Ure
- Producers: Phil Lynott, Kit Woolven

Phil Lynott singles chronology
| "King's Call" (1980) | "Yellow Pearl" (1981) | "Together" (1982) |

"Yellow Pearl" is a song recorded by Thin Lizzy frontman Phil Lynott, originally for his 1980 solo album, Solo in Soho. It was written by Lynott and Midge Ure, who was a temporary member of Thin Lizzy at the time, as well as frontman of Ultravox. It was subsequently remixed and released again on Lynott's second album, The Philip Lynott Album. The remixed version was used as the theme music to the British music chart television programme Top of the Pops from 1981 to 1986.

== Background ==
"Yellow Pearl" originated during a Thin Lizzy tour of Japan in September 1979, during which time Midge Ure was playing keyboards in the band. He had initially been drafted in as a guitarist to replace Gary Moore who had left the band abruptly during a tour of the US. For the Japanese tour, Dave Flett was brought in to play guitar and Ure switched to keyboards. "I was never a keyboard player by any stretch of the imagination," Ure admitted, but added that Lynott kept him in the band to add an extra dimension to the sound.

At rehearsals and soundchecks Ure would often play around with the riff to "Yellow Pearl", and Lynott remembered the tune when recording songs for Solo in Soho. He asked Ure to help him work the idea into a full song, around the same time as he was building a home studio, and Ure was introducing him to new developments in recording technology. Ure has said, "I actually have no idea what the song is really about, except perhaps that, as a thin outline, it's a comment on the thought of Japanese technology taking over – a twist on the Yellow Peril idea." Lynott and Ure were also influenced by the new technology that they saw in Japan, such as the new Sony Walkman, and by a trip to see the Yellow Magic Orchestra.

Regarding the lyrics, Ure was amused by Lynott attempting to make every word rhyme, commenting, "You'll hear that some of what he sings is complete nonsense, stuff that came off the top of his head and just happened to rhyme. It still makes me laugh today."

== Release ==
The song initially featured a female spoken-voice intro ("We all must beware of the Yellow Pearl"), and used a drum machine. This version was featured on Lynott's first solo album, Solo in Soho, released on 18 April 1980. On its first release as a single in the UK in March 1981, the song reached No. 56 in the British charts, and No. 25 in Ireland.

=== Top of the Pops ===
After the initial release of the single, Lynott recalled that he was approached by Top of the Pops producer Michael Hurll, who told Lynott that he liked "Yellow Pearl" and asked him to write new theme music for the programme. When asked what kind of song he wanted, Hurll replied, "Something like "Yellow Pearl"," and Lynott suggested simply using that song.

After the remixed version was chosen as the Top of the Pops theme music in the summer of 1981, the remix was released as a single in December, reaching No. 14 in the UK, and No. 13 in Ireland. It was accompanied by a video, costing around £20,000 and directed by Midge Ure, who appeared in silhouette in the video.

The remix was over a minute shorter in length, dispensed with the spoken intro, and featured more prominent drums. The 12" single featured a longer remix, including the spoken intro, with drums by Rusty Egan. Lynott later said, "It has made me a fortune; every time I see Top of the Pops the cash register in me head starts ringing." When pressed about the actual value of the royalties, he answered, "About 2p, I don't know. I wish I'd written the theme tune to Coronation Street." Another version of the song was used as the chart rundown music between 1984 and 1986. This version featured electric guitar sounds instead of the popular synthpop version.

== Personnel ==
- Phil Lynott – vocals, guitar, bass guitar, Minimoog, vocoder, percussion
- Midge Ure – ARP synthesizer, Minimoog, string machine, Linn drum machine (remix)
- Billy Currie – ARP synthesizer
- Brian Downey – drum machine
- Rusty Egan – drums (12" remix)
- Laureen – spoken intro (original version only)
