= Philomena Lynott =

Irish author and entrepreneur (1930–2019)

- Lynott by Phil's statue in 2013
- Born: 22 October 1930; Crumlin, Dublin, Ireland
- Died: 12 June 2019 (aged 88); Dublin, Ireland
- Occupations: Author, hotel manager
- Children: 3, including Phil Lynott

Philomena Lynott (22 October 1930 – 12 June 2019) was an Irish author and entrepreneur. She was the mother of Thin Lizzy frontman Phil Lynott. Her autobiography, My Boy, documents their relationship. She was the proprietor of the Clifton Grange Hotel in Manchester, which provided accommodation for a number of bands in the 1970s including Thin Lizzy.

== Biography ==
Philomena Lynott was born on 22 October 1930 as the fourth of nine children to Frank and Sarah Lynott in Dublin, and grew up in the Crumlin district of the city. She left school aged 13 and worked in an elderly people's home.

In 1947 Lynott took advantage of a viable job market in England, which needed labour to rebuild damage caused by World War II, finding work as a nurse in Manchester. She began a relationship with Cecil Parris, which led to Philip's birth on 20 August 1949. She suffered prejudice because she did not marry Cecil Parris and was the mother of a mixed-race son, who she decided would best be raised by her parents in Dublin. Lynott had two other children that she placed for adoption. She remained close to her son throughout his life but because she only saw him sporadically felt they were more like sister and brother or friends instead of a typical mother and son relationship.

In 1964 Lynott began a relationship with Dennis Keeley and the couple took over management of the Clifton Grange Hotel in Whalley Range, Manchester. Though they had no experience in running a hotel, they bought the property after six months and remained there for the next 14 years. The hotel became well known in northwest England for being frequented by the show business trade. Lynott took advantage of hotel licensing laws, which meant the bar could be open at 2 am when all other local venues had shut. When Thin Lizzy became commercially successful in the 1970s, the band looked forward to gigging in Manchester as Philomena would accommodate them and put on an after-show party. Guitarist Brian Robertson recalls Philomena insisting on washing his hair before a television appearance, and later said she was "like everyone's mum, rolled into one." When the Sex Pistols played Manchester on the Anarchy Tour in December 1976, she was the only hotelier willing to accommodate them.

In 1980 Lynott and Keeley moved to Sutton, on Howth Head, north of Dublin, into a house Philip bought for them, White Horses. They later moved to Glen Corr, a house also on the Howth peninsula, and later again back to White Horses. She was unaware of her son's history of drug abuse until late 1985. Lynott was not present at her son's bedside when he died on 4 January 1986 in Salisbury General Infirmary, having received a telephone call at her house in Kew that Philip was dead. Lynott suffered depression following her son's death and found it hard to come to terms with. She had a difficult relationship with her daughter-in-law, Caroline Crowther, after Philip's death and was forced to apply for a court order to see her grandchildren.

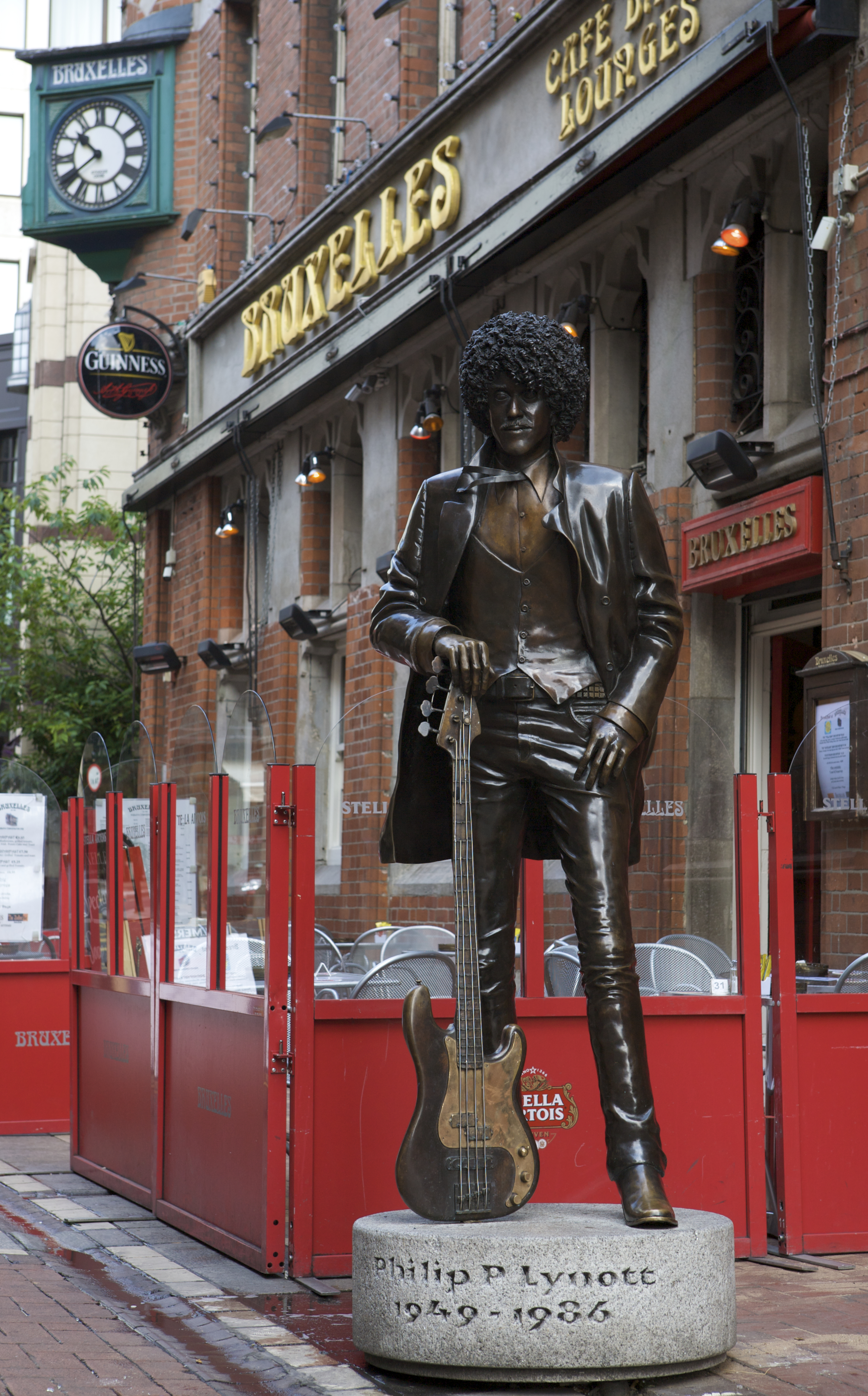
Statue of Phil Lynott on Harry Street, Dublin

In the early 1990s, Lynott was approached by publishers asking if she would like to write her memoirs. She found the experience of re-examining the relationship with her son difficult, but rewarding. The book My Boy: The Philip Lynott Story was published by Hot Press Books in 1995. She regularly attended rock concerts around Dublin, and continued to commemorate Philip's life. She was a key figure in getting a bronze statue of him made and placed in Dublin in 2005, and was the special guest at Thin Lizzy fan events.

In 2012, Lynott objected to Mitt Romney's use of Thin Lizzy's "The Boys Are Back in Town" during his election campaign. In an interview with Irish rock magazine Hot Press, Philomena said, "As far as I am concerned, Mitt Romney's opposition to gay marriage and to civil unions for gays makes him anti-gay – which is not something that Philip would have supported."

Lynott died on 12 June 2019, after suffering from cancer for a number of years. The Irish President Michael D. Higgins praised her work campaigning for LGBT rights and against drug use.

== Published works ==
- Lynott, Philomena; Hayden, Jackie (1995). Niall Stokes (ed.). My Boy: The Philip Lynott Story. Hot Press Books. ISBN 978-0-753-50048-4.
