= Old Town (song) =

1982 single by Phil Lynott

Single by Philip Lynott

from the album The Philip Lynott Album
- B-side: "Beat of the Drum"
- Released: 1982
- Genre: Pop rock
- Length: 3:27
- Label: Virgin (Ireland); Vertigo (UK, Netherlands)
- Songwriter(s): Philip Lynott; Jimmy Bain
- Producer(s): Philip Lynott; Kit Woolven

Official audio
- "Old Town" on YouTube

"Old Town" is a song by Thin Lizzy frontman Philip Lynott, released as a single from his 1982 solo album, The Philip Lynott Album. The lyrics describe the end of a romance.

In the music video, Lynott can be seen on the Ha'penny Bridge in Dublin, as well as several other locations around the city centre including the Long Hall pub on South Great George's Street, Grafton Street and Ringsend Pier.

The song features keyboardist Darren Wharton, a member of Thin Lizzy, on piano.

== Chart performance ==
Chart	Peak position
Netherlands (Single Top 100)	46

== Track listings ==
- Ireland: Virgin / VIS 103 (Without spoken intro)
- The Netherlands: Vertigo / 6059 580
- UK: Vertigo / SOLO 5

Side one
No.	Title	Writer(s)	Length
1.	"Old Town"	Philip Lynott; Jimmy Bain	3:27

Side one
No.	Title	Writer(s)	Length
2.	"Beat of the Drum"	Lynott; Jackie Daly; Johnny "Ringo" McDonagh; Brian Downey

== The Corrs version ==
"Old Town (This Boy Is Cracking Up)"

Single by The Corrs

from the album The Corrs Unplugged
- Released: April 2000
- Recorded: 5 October 1999
- Studio: Ardmore Studios, County Wicklow, Ireland
- Genre: Pop; Celtic; folk rock
- Length: 3:14
- Label: 143 Records; Lava Records; Atlantic Records
- Songwriter(s): Philip Lynott; Jimmy Bain
- Producer(s): Mitchell Froom; The Corrs

The Corrs singles chronology
"Radio" (1999)	"Old Town (This Boy Is Cracking Up)" (2000)	"Breathless" (2000)

The Corrs covered Old Town during their MTV Unplugged performance in 1999, and later recorded a studio version for their 2005 album Home.

The live version was released as a single under the title Old Town (This Boy Is Cracking Up) in 2000 in Singapore, Belgium, and the Netherlands. The 2005 studio recording was later released as a double A-side single alongside "Heart Like a Wheel" and was included in the 2006 compilation album Dreams: The Ultimate Corrs Collection. The band also performed the song during their In Blue Tour.

The piccolo trumpet solo in the song was played by Ronan Dooney.

=== Chart performance ===
Chart (2000)	Peak position
Canadian Adult Contemporary	73
Spain (PROMUSICAE)	18

=== Track listings ===
No.	Title	Writer(s)	Length
1.	"Old Town (This Boy Is Cracking Up)"	Philip Lynott, Jimmy Bain	3:14
2.	"What I Know"	Glen Ballard, Siedah Garrett	3:49
3.	"Little Wing" (Rehearsal version)	Jimi Hendrix	4:30
