= The Philip Lynott Album =

- Cover photo by John Swannell

Studio album by Philip Lynott
- Released: 17 September 1982
- Recorded: 1981
- Studio: Good Earth, London, UK; Odyssey, London, UK; Compass Point, Nassau, The Bahamas; Windmill Lane, Dublin, Ireland
- Genre: Rock
- Length: 44:10
- Label: Vertigo (Europe); Warner Bros. (US)
- Producer: Philip Lynott, Kit Woolven, Midge Ure ("Together")

Philip Lynott chronology
Solo in Soho (1980)	The Philip Lynott Album (1982)	Live In Sweden 1983 (2001)

Singles from The Philip Lynott Album
- 1. "Yellow Pearl" Released: December 1981; 2. "Together" Released: July 1982; 3. "Old Town" Released: December 1982

Professional ratings
Review scores
Source	Rating
AllMusic	4/5 stars
Collector's Guide to Heavy Metal	10/10

The Philip Lynott Album is the second and final solo album by Irish rock singer Philip Lynott, released in 1982.

Not included on the album was the B-side to the "Together" single, "Somebody Else's Dream" and the B-side to the "Old Town" single, "Beat of the Drum". Both later appeared on the Yellow Pearl Lynott solo compilation album in 2010. "Somebody Else's Dream" was performed live on The Old Grey Whistle Test to promote the album.

== Track listing ==
All tracks composed by Philip Lynott, except where noted

Side one

1. "Fatalistic Attitude" – 4:31
2. "The Man's a Fool" – 2:58
3. "Old Town" (Lynott, Jimmy Bain) – 3:27
4. "Cathleen" – 3:34
5. "Growing Up" – 5:00
6. "Yellow Pearl" (Lynott, Midge Ure) – 2:58

Side two

7. "Together" – 3:39
8. "Little Bit of Water" – 3:35
9. "Ode to Liberty (The Protest Song)" (Lynott, Bain) – 5:48
10. "Gino" – 4:10
11. "Don't Talk About Me Baby" – 4:30

== Singles ==
- "Together" / "Somebody Else's Dream" – 7" (1982)
- "Together" (Dance Mix) / "Together" / "Somebody Else's Dream" – 12" (1982)
- "Old Town" / "Beat of the Drum" – 7" (1982)

== Personnel ==
- Philip Lynott – vocals, bass guitar, bass synthesiser, timpani & cymbal, CR 76 computer drum machines, guitar, Sarah's space gun, Irish harp, keyboards, percussion, Producer
- Midge Ure – guitar, keyboards, Linn drum machine (tracks 6, 7), producer (track 7)
- Mark Knopfler – lead guitar (track 9)
- Jimmy Bain – bass guitar, backing vocals (tracks 2, 3)
- Jerome Rimson – bass guitar (tracks 7, 10)
- Scott Gorham – bass guitar (track 8)
- Fiachra Trench – string and brass arrangements
- Darren Wharton – keyboards, drum machine (tracks 1–9, 11)
- Huey Lewis – harmonica (track 4)
- Mel Collins – saxophone (track 5)
- Rusty Egan – drums (tracks 2–4)
- Bobby C. Benberg – drums (track 8)
- Brian Downey – drums (track 9)
- Mark Nauseef – drums, percussion, vocal intro (track 10)
- Pierre Moerlen – drums (track 11)
- Gordon Johnson – intro voice (track 3)
- Suzanne Machon – intro voice (track 4)
- Monica Lynott – backing vocals (tracks 4, 5)

Production

- Kit Woolven – producer, engineer
- Mark Knopfler, Neil Dorfsman – mixing on track 9

== Charts ==
Chart (1982)	Peak position
Swedish Albums (Sverigetopplistan)	18

Chart (2022)	Peak position
Irish Albums (OCC)	40
