= Rodger Collins =

- Birth name: Rogers Collins Jr.
- Also known as: Hajji Rajah Kasim Sabrie
- Born: August 20, 1940 (age 84); Santa Anna, Texas, U.S.
- Origin: Oakland, California, U.S.
- Genres: R&B, soul
- Occupation: Singer
- Instrument: Vocals
- Years active: c.1960–1974, 2000s
- Labels: Galaxy, Garden Tree
- Website: www.rodgercollins.com

Rodger Collins Jr. (born August 20, 1940), also known as Hajji Rajah Kasim Sabrie, is an American soul and funk singer and musician.

== Biography ==
Collins was born in Santa Anna, Texas, moving to San Francisco, California as a teenager. He won a talent show in Oakland, before studying drama in San Francisco. He sang in clubs, and in the early 1960s was signed by Fantasy Records, who issued his records on their subsidiary Galaxy label. Although his first two singles were unsuccessful, his third record, "She's Looking Good", written by Collins and arranged by Ray Shanklin, reached number 44 on the Billboard R&B chart and number 101 on the pop chart in 1966. The song was later a bigger hit for Wilson Pickett, and was also recorded by David Lee Roth, and by Jack Mack and the Heart Attack for the 1985 movie Tuff Turf.

Collins' other notable recordings included, in 1970, "Foxy Girls in Oakland", written by Joe Crane of the Hoodoo Rhythm Devils; and "You Sexy Sugar Plum" released on Fantasy Records in 1973. The latter track peaked at number 22 in the UK Singles Chart when reissued in 1976 in response to demand on the northern soul scene. Collins was noted for his energetic performances, which included a stint opening for Elvis Presley and Ike & Tina Turner in Las Vegas, Nevada in the mid-1970s. He also wrote songs recorded by other singers, including Charles Brown and Sugar Pie DeSanto.

After touring with Joe Tex, Collins converted to Islam, and changed his name to Rajah Kasim Sabrie. He largely retired from performing in 1974, later establishing an appliance repair business in Oakland. He also set up Garden Tree Music to release his own recordings, issuing the albums Through My Eyes (2009) and Just One More Time (2013).
