= Dear Miss Lonely Hearts =

1980 song by Phil Lynott

Single by Phil Lynott

from the album Solo in Soho
- B-side: "Solo in Soho"
- Released: 14 March 1980
- Recorded: January–February 1980
- Studio: Good Earth Studios, London
- Length: 4:10
- Label: Vertigo
- Songwriters: Phil Lynott; Jimmy Bain
- Producers: Phil Lynott; Kit Woolven

Phil Lynott singles chronology
"Spanish Guitar" (1979)	"Dear Miss Lonely Hearts" (1980)	"King's Call" (1980)

Music video
- "Dear Miss Lonely Hearts" on YouTube

"Dear Miss Lonely Hearts" is a song by Irish singer and musician Phil Lynott, released by Vertigo Records on 14 March 1980 as his debut solo single from his studio album Solo in Soho (1980). The song was written by Lynott and Jimmy Bain, and was produced by Lynott and Kit Woolven. It reached number 32 in the UK singles chart and remained in the top 75 for six weeks.

== Writing ==
"Dear Miss Lonely Hearts" was one of the first songs that Lynott and Jimmy Bain wrote together. Bain later recalled to author Alan Byrne: "I had these chord changes on the guitar that were the same in the verse and chorus. Phil didn't come up with the 'Dear Miss Lonely Hearts' angle right away but when he did, the song went to another level."

== Recording ==
"Dear Miss Lonely Hearts" was recorded at Good Earth Studios in London in January and February 1980. Although it was a Phil Lynott solo track, the song was recorded by all four members of Thin Lizzy and Lynott's bandmates also appeared in the music video.

== Critical reception ==
Upon its release, Pauline McLeod of the Daily Mirror praised "Dear Miss Lonely Hearts" as a "smashing single" but also asked: "Who will recognise [his] solo effort as anything different from what he puts out with Thin Lizzy?" David Hepworth, writing for Smash Hits, described it as a "cooler, more airy variation on the usual three chord fandango". Mike Gardner of Record Mirror noted the "nice production" but felt the song "sounds as if it took longer to write the lyrics than to make the music which is throwaway". He continued: "It makes it very difficult to sustain interest in his plea for another lonely heart."

== Live performances ==
When performing the song live with his band Grand Slam in 1984, Lynott incorporated snippets of Rod Stewart's 1984 hit "Some Guys Have All the Luck" and the Police's 1983 hit "Every Breath You Take" into the track.

== Track listing ==
7–inch single (UK, Ireland, Europe and South Africa)

1. "Dear Miss Lonely Hearts" – 4:10
2. "Solo in Soho" – 4:07

12–inch single (UK)

1. "Dear Miss Lonely Hearts" – 4:10
2. "Solo in Soho" – 4:07

== Personnel ==
"Dear Miss Lonely Hearts"

- Phil Lynott – vocals, bass guitar, keyboards
- Scott Gorham – lead guitar, rhythm guitar
- Snowy White – lead guitar, rhythm guitar
- Brian Downey – drums

Production

- Phil Lynott – production
- Kit Woolven – production

== Charts ==
Chart (1980)	Peak position
Ireland (IRMA)	6
UK Singles (Official Charts)	32
UK Singles Chart (Record Business)	35
UK Airplay Guide 100 (Record Business)	47
