= Phil Lynott =

Irish rock musician (1949–1986)

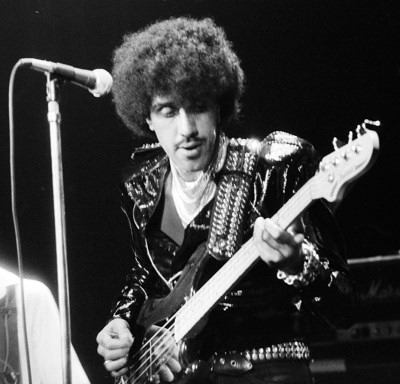
- Lynott performing in 1980

Background information
- Also known as: The Ace with the Bass
- Born: Philip Parris Lynott; 20 August 1949; West Bromwich, Staffordshire, England
- Origin: Dublin, Ireland
- Died: 4 January 1986 (aged 36) Salisbury, Wiltshire, England
- Genres: Rock; hard rock; blues rock; heavy metal; Celtic rock
- Occupations: Musician; singer; songwriter; producer; poet
- Instruments: Vocals; bass guitar; guitar
- Years active: 1965–1985
- Labels: Vertigo; Mercury; Warner Bros.
- Formerly of: Thin Lizzy; Grand Slam; The Greedies; Skid Row; The Crowd

Philip Parris Lynott (/ˈlaɪnɒt/, LIE-not; 20 August 1949 – 4 January 1986) was an Irish musician who was the co-founder, lead vocalist, bassist, and primary songwriter of the hard rock band Thin Lizzy. He was noted for his distinctive pick-based style on the bass and for his imaginative lyrics, including working-class tales and numerous characters drawn from personal influences and Celtic culture.

Lynott was born in the West Midlands of England and grew up in Dublin with his grandparents. He remained close to his mother, Philomena, throughout his life. He fronted several bands as a lead vocalist, including Skid Row alongside Gary Moore, before learning the bass guitar and forming Thin Lizzy in 1969. After initial success with "Whiskey in the Jar", the band had several hits in the mid-1970s, such as "The Boys Are Back in Town", "Jailbreak" and "Waiting for an Alibi", and became a popular live attraction combining Lynott's vocal and songwriting skills with dual lead guitars. Towards the end of the 1970s, Lynott embarked upon a solo career and published two books of poetry. After Thin Lizzy disbanded, he assembled and fronted the band Grand Slam.

During the 1980s, Lynott increasingly suffered from drug addiction, particularly to heroin. He and Moore had one more chart success with "Out in the Fields" in 1985, before Lynott died of septicaemia-induced pneumonia and heart failure early the following year. He remains a popular figure in rock music, and a statue in his memory was erected in Dublin in 2005.

== Early life ==
Philip Parris Lynott was born at Hallam Hospital in West Bromwich on 20 August 1949. His Irish mother, Philomena Lynott, was born in Dublin. His Guyanese father, Cecil Parris, was from Georgetown. The two met in Birmingham in 1948 after Cecil had moved to England for work, beginning a relationship for a few months until Cecil was transferred to London. Philomena soon found out she was pregnant; after Lynott was born, she moved with him to a home for unmarried mothers in Selly Park, where Philip was baptised on 4 September. She subsequently moved to Manchester but stayed in touch with Parris, who helped pay for his son's support. She subsequently had two more children who were put up for adoption.

Lynott first attended school in Manchester's Moss Side. In 1957, Philomena sent him to live with her parents, Sarah and Frank in the Crumlin area of Dublin. Frank's presence gave him a father figure for the first time in his life. He knew he was different from his peers, but did not suffer any major racist attacks. Philomena stayed in Manchester and remained close to Lynott. She and her partner, Dennis Keeley, later took over the management of the Clifton Grange Hotel in Whalley Range. The hotel, nicknamed "The Biz", became popular with show business figures and was later referred to in a song on Thin Lizzy's debut album. Lynott had a happy childhood growing up in Dublin and was popular at school.

== Career ==
=== Early years ===
Lynott was introduced to music through his uncle Timothy's record collection, and became influenced by Motown and The Mamas & the Papas. He joined his first band, the Black Eagles, in 1965 as a lead singer, playing popular covers in local clubs around Dublin. He attended the Scoil Colm Christian Brothers' School on Armagh Road in Crumlin, where he became friends with Brian Downey, who was later persuaded to join the band from the Liffey Beats. The group fell apart due to the lack of interest of manager Joe Smith, particularly after the departure of his two sons, guitarists Danny and Frankie.

Lynott then left the family home and moved into a flat in Clontarf, where he briefly joined the group Kama Sutra. It was in this band that he learned his frontman skills, and worked out how to interact with an audience. In early 1968, he teamed up with bassist Brendan 'Brush' Shiels to form Skid Row. Downey was not interested in Shiels' request to be the drummer, so the job went to Noel Bridgeman. The band signed a deal with Ted Carroll, who would later go on to manage Thin Lizzy, and played a variety of covers including "Eight Miles High", "Hey Jude" and several numbers by Jimi Hendrix. Because Lynott did not play an instrument at this point in his career, he instead manipulated his voice through an echo box during instrumental sections. He took to smearing boot polish under his eyes on stage to draw attention to himself, which he would continue to do throughout Lizzy's career later on, and regularly performed a mock fight with Shiels onstage to attract the crowd. In mid-1968, guitarist Bernard Cheevers quit to work full-time at the Guinness brewery in Dublin and was replaced by Belfast-born guitarist Gary Moore.

Despite increased success, and the release of a single, "New Faces, Old Places", Shiels became concerned about Lynott's tendency to sing off-key. He then discovered that the problem was with Lynott's tonsils; he subsequently took a leave of absence from the band. By the time he had recovered, Shiels had decided to take over singing lead and reduce the band to a three-piece. Feeling guilty of having effectively sacked one of his best friends, he taught Lynott how to play bass, figuring it would be easier to learn than a six-string guitar, and sold him a Fender Jazz Bass he had bought from Robert Ballagh for £36, and started giving him lessons.

Lynott and Downey quickly put together a new band called Orphanage, with guitarist Joe Staunton and bassist Pat Quigley, playing a mixture of original material alongside covers of Bob Dylan, Free and Jeff Beck. Still learning the bass, Lynott restricted himself to occasional rhythm guitar alongside singing lead.

At the end of 2006, a number of Skid Row and Orphanage demo tapes featuring Lynott were discovered. These were his earliest recordings and had been presumed lost for decades.

=== Thin Lizzy ===
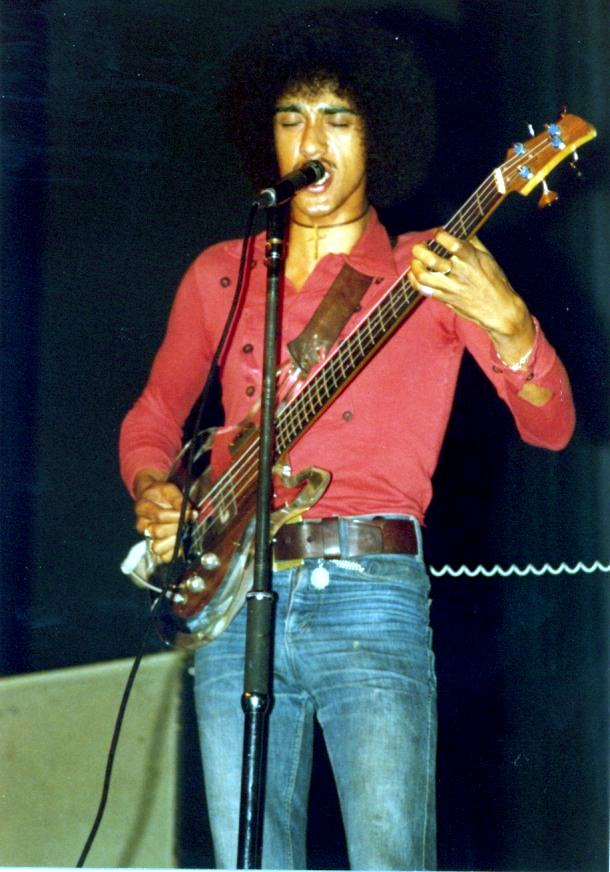
Lynott with Thin Lizzy in Frankfurt, 1972

Towards the end of 1969, Lynott and Downey were introduced to guitarist Eric Bell via a founding member of Them, keyboardist Eric Wrixon (Bell had played in a later lineup of Them). Deciding that Bell was a better guitarist, and with Lynott now confident enough to play bass himself, the four formed Thin Lizzy. The name came from the character "Tin Lizzie" in the comic The Dandy, which in turn came from the nickname for the Ford Model T car. The H was deliberately added to mimic the way the word "thin" is pronounced in a Dublin accent. Lynott later discovered the saying attributed to Henry Ford, "Any colour you like as long as it's black," which he felt was appropriate for him. Wrixon was felt by the others to be surplus to requirements and left after the release of the band's first single, "The Farmer", in July 1970.

During the band's early years – and despite being the singer, bassist and chief songwriter – Lynott was still fairly reserved and introverted on stage, and would stand to one side while the spotlight concentrated on Bell, who was initially regarded as the group's leader. During the recording of the band's second album, Shades of a Blue Orphanage (1972), Lynott very nearly left Thin Lizzy to form a new band with Deep Purple's Ritchie Blackmore and Ian Paice, called Baby Face. "Ritchie turned up in the studio one day to jam," recalled Downey. "I was asked to play drums to Phil and Ritchie jamming… Me and Eric looked at each other like, 'Well, that's the end of the band then.' It lasted a week, then Phil came back as if nothing had happened. He wanted to be the leader of his own band, not the singer in someone else's." Due to being in dire financial straits Lizzy did, however, soon record an album of Deep Purple covers under the name Funky Junction. Lynott did not sing on the album as he felt his voice was not in the same style as Ian Gillan.

Towards the end of 1972, Thin Lizzy got their first major break in the UK by supporting Slade, then nearing the height of their commercial success. Inspired by Noddy Holder's top hat with mirrors, Lynott decided to attach a mirror to his bass, which he carried over to subsequent tours. On the opening night of the tour, an altercation broke out between Lynott and Slade's manager Chas Chandler, who chastised Lynott's lack of stage presence and interaction with the audience and threatened to throw Lizzy off the tour unless things improved immediately. Lynott subsequently developed the onstage rapport and stage presence that would become familiar over the remainder of the decade.

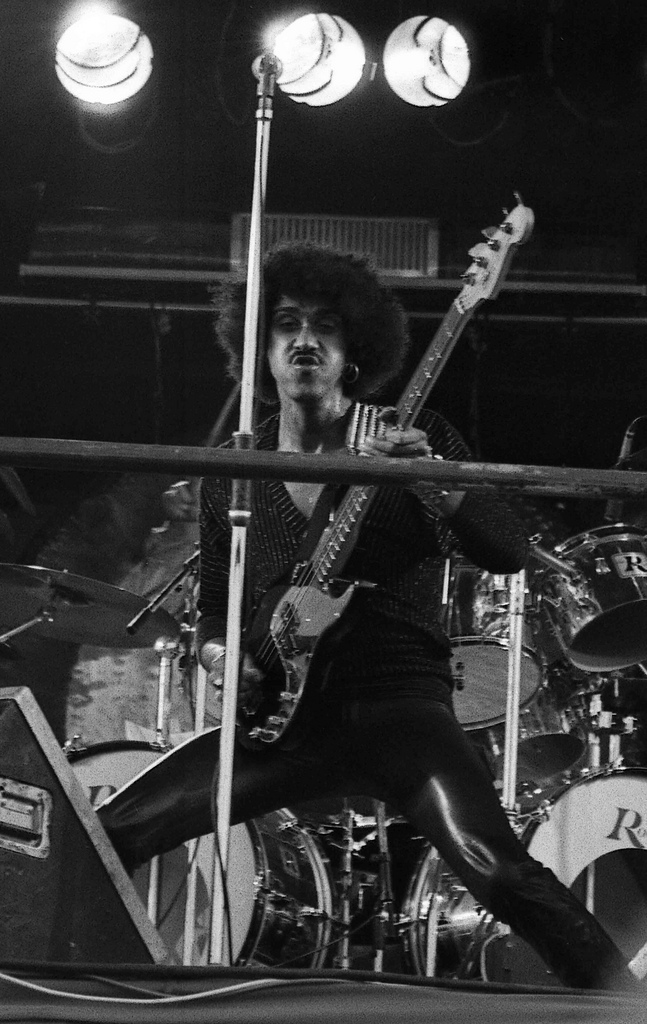
Lynott on stage with Thin Lizzy in the Netherlands, 1978

Thin Lizzy's first top-ten hit was in 1973, with a rock version of the traditional Irish song "Whiskey in the Jar", featuring a cover by Irish artist and friend Jim Fitzpatrick. However, follow-up singles failed to chart and, after the departure of Bell, quickly followed by Moore replacing him and, briefly, Downey, Thin Lizzy were near collapse by mid-1974. It was not until the recruitment of guitarists Scott Gorham and Brian Robertson and the release of Jailbreak in 1976 that Thin Lizzy became international superstars on the strength of the album's biggest hit, "The Boys Are Back in Town". The song reached the top 10 in the UK, was No. 1 in Ireland and a hit in the US and Canada. However, while touring with Rainbow, Lynott contracted hepatitis and the band had to cancel touring.

Lynott befriended Huey Lewis while Lewis's band, Clover, was supporting them on tour. Lewis was impressed with Lynott's frontman abilities and was inspired to perform better, eventually achieving commercial success in the 1980s. Lynott's songs, including "Cowboy Song" and "Massacre", were influenced by the band's US touring. He had a particular affinity for Los Angeles.

Having finally achieved mainstream success, Thin Lizzy embarked on several consecutive world tours. The band built on Jailbreak's success with the release of a string of hit albums, including Johnny the Fox (1976), Bad Reputation (1977), Black Rose: A Rock Legend (1979), and the live album Live and Dangerous (1978), which features Lynott in the foreground on the cover. However, the band was suffering from personnel changes, with Robertson being replaced temporarily by Moore in 1976, and then permanently the following year, partly due to a personal clash with Lynott.

"I used to note specifically these shady characters ... who used to turn up backstage. I knew they were drug-pushers and I made an effort to stop them getting passes. He [Lynott] said 'They're my mates!' But I said, 'No, Phil, they're not your mates.'"

— Thin Lizzy tour manager Adrian Hopkins, on the band's latter touring days

By the early 1980s, Thin Lizzy were starting to struggle commercially, and Lynott started showing symptoms of drug abuse, including regular asthma attacks. After the resignation of longtime manager Chris O'Donnell, and with Gorham wanting to quit, Lynott decided to disband Thin Lizzy in 1983. He had started to use heroin by this stage in his career, and it affected the band's shows in Japan when he was unable to obtain any. He managed to pick himself up for the band's show at the Reading Festival and their last gig (with Lynott as frontman) in Nuremberg on 4 September.

=== Later years ===
In 1978, Lynott began working on projects outside Thin Lizzy. He was featured in Jeff Wayne's Musical Version of The War of the Worlds, singing and speaking the role of Parson Nathaniel on "The Spirit of Man". He performed sessions for a number of artists, including singing backing vocals with Bob Geldof on Blast Furnace and the Heatwaves' "Blue Wave" EP.

Lynott took a keen interest in the emergence of punk rock in the late 1970s, and subsequently became friends with various members of the Sex Pistols, The Damned and Geldof's band The Boomtown Rats. This led to him forming an ad-hoc band known as "The Greedies" (originally "The Greedy Bastards", but edited for public politeness). The band started playing shows in London during Lizzy's downtime in 1978, playing a mixture of popular Lizzy tracks and Pistols songs recorded after John Lydon's departure. In 1979, The Greedies recorded a Christmas single, "A Merry Jingle", featuring other members of Thin Lizzy as well as the Pistols' Steve Jones and Paul Cook. The previous year, he had performed alongside Jones and Cook on Johnny Thunders' debut solo album So Alone. Lynott became friends with Midge Ure of the Rich Kids, who deputised for Thin Lizzy during 1979 shortly after joining Ultravox. Lynott persuaded Thin Lizzy's management to sign Ultravox.

In 1980, though Thin Lizzy were still enjoying considerable success, Lynott launched a solo career with the album, Solo in Soho: this was a Top 30 UK album and yielded two hit singles that year, "Dear Miss Lonely Hearts" and "King's Call". The latter was a tribute to Elvis Presley, and featured Mark Knopfler on guitar. His second solo venture, The Philip Lynott Album (1982) was a chart flop, despite the presence of the single "Old Town". The song "Yellow Pearl" (1982), was a No. 14 hit in the UK and became the theme tune to Top of the Pops.

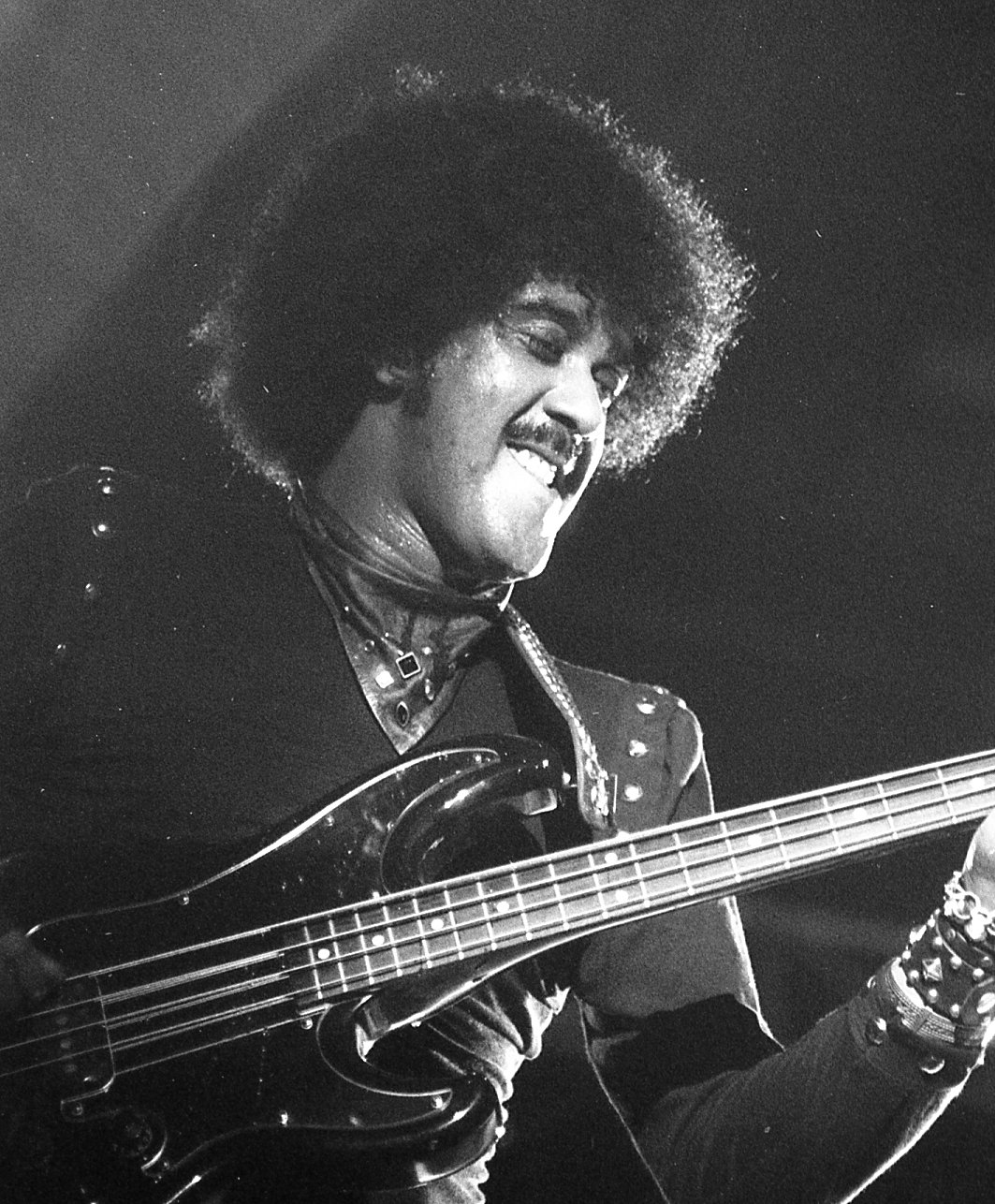
Lynott playing at the Reading Rock Festival, 1983

In 1983, following the disbanding of Thin Lizzy, Lynott recorded a rock'n'roll medley single, "We Are the Boys (Who Make All the Noise)" with Roy Wood, Chas Hodges and John Coghlan. Lynott regularly collaborated with former bandmate Moore on tracks including the singles "Parisienne Walkways" (a No. 8 UK hit in 1979) and "Out in the Fields" (a No. 5 UK hit in 1985, his highest-charting single). In 1984, he formed a new band, Grand Slam, with Doish Nagle, Laurence Archer, Robbie Brennan and Mark Stanway. The band toured The Marquee and other clubs, but suffered from being labelled a poor version of Thin Lizzy owing to the inclusion of two lead guitar players, and split up at the end of the year due to a lack of money and Lynott's increasing addiction to heroin.

During 1983–1985 Lynott co-wrote songs with British R&B artist Junior Giscombe, although nothing was officially released and most remain as demos. However, one song, "The Lady Loves to Dance", was mastered with producer Tony Visconti and nearly released before being pulled by the record company, Phonogram. Lynott was particularly upset about not being asked to participate in Live Aid, which had been organised by his two friends, Geldof and Ure, the latter of whom had briefly stood in as a guitarist for Thin Lizzy. Geldof later said this was because the Band Aid Trust could only accommodate commercially successful artists selling millions of albums, which neither Lynott nor Thin Lizzy had done. In 1984, Lynott appeared as team captain (against Alvin Stardust) on the 1980s BBC quiz show Pop Quiz, hosted by Mike Read.

His last single "Nineteen", produced by Paul Hardcastle, was released a few weeks before his death. It bore no relation to the producer's chart-topping single of the same title some months earlier. "This was a guy whose records I used to play when I was at school," said Hardcastle. "He was a hero of mine – I couldn't work out why he wanted to work with me. He said to me, 'You're at the top of your game technically right now, so can you help me?'" The producer played the bassline on Lynott's Fender. "He walked in on me playing it and I thought, 'Shit!' said Hardcastle. "But he said, 'That's fokken great – we're keeping that on there."

Throughout December 1985 Lynott promoted "Nineteen", performing live on various television shows. The same month, he gave his final interviews in which he promulgated his possible plans for the near future; these included more work with Moore and even the possibility of reforming Thin Lizzy, something which he had privately discussed with Gorham previously. He recorded some material with Archer, Lewis, and members of the News in 1985, which was not released.

Lynott was closely associated with producer Kit Woolven, who died in 2022.

=== Poetry ===
Lynott's first book of poetry, Songs for While I'm Away, was published in 1974. It contained 21 poems that were all lyrics from Thin Lizzy songs, except one titled "A Holy Encounter". Only 1,000 copies of the book were printed. In 1977, a second volume was released, titled Philip. In 1997, both books were brought together in a single volume, again titled Songs for While I'm Away. This compendium edition featured illustrations by Tim Booth and Jim Fitzpatrick, and the original introductions by Peter Fallon and John Peel.

== Personal life ==
Born in England and raised in Ireland, Lynott always considered himself to be Irish. His friend and Thin Lizzy bandmate Scott Gorham said in 2013, "Phil was so proud of being Irish. No matter where he went in the world if we were talking to a journalist and they got something wrong about Ireland, he'd give the guy a history lesson. It meant a lot to him." In the early 1980s, he purchased properties on the Howth peninsula north of Dublin, one of which, White Horses in Sutton, was a 50th birthday present for his mother; the house was later the site of a memorial room for Lynott.

Lynott's first child was a son born in Dublin in 1968. The child was placed for adoption, and the mother's identity has not been made public. In 2003, that son was publicly identified. On 14 February 1980 Lynott married Caroline Crowther, a daughter of British comedian Leslie Crowther. He met her when she was working for Tony Brainsby in the late 1970s. They had two children: Sarah, for whom the eponymous 1979 song was written, and Cathleen, for whom the eponymous 1982 Lynott solo song was written. The marriage fell apart in 1984 after Lynott's drug use escalated.

Lynott was a football fan and supported Manchester United. He was good friends with United and Northern Ireland footballer George Best, and the pair regularly socialised at the Clifton Grange Hotel. Lynott later became a shareholder of the club.

== Death ==
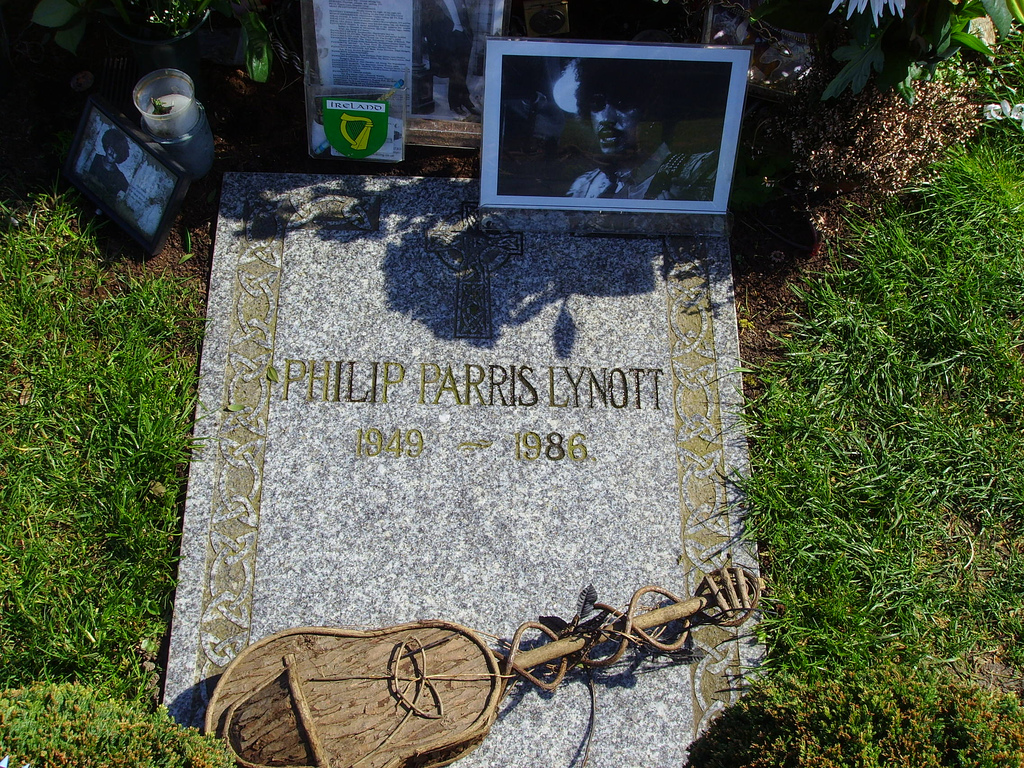
Lynott's grave at St Fintan's Cemetery in Dublin

Lynott's final years were heavily affected by drug addiction, leading to his collapse at his home in Kew on 25 December 1985. He was discovered by his mother, who was not aware of his heroin addiction. She contacted his wife, Caroline, who knew about it and immediately identified the problem as serious. After Caroline drove him to a drug clinic at Clouds House, he was taken to Salisbury Infirmary, where he was diagnosed with septicaemia. Although he regained consciousness enough to speak to his mother, his condition worsened by the start of the new year and he was put on a ventilator. He died of septicaemia-induced pneumonia and heart failure on 4 January 1986, at the age of 36.

Lynott's funeral was held at St Elizabeth's Church in London on 9 January, with most Thin Lizzy ex-members in attendance, followed by a second service at Howth Parish Church near Dublin on 11 January. He was buried at St Fintan's Cemetery in Dublin.

== Legacy ==
=== Thin Lizzy revivals and Vibe for Philo ===
"I still listen to his music every single day ... I go over and I pour water on to his gravestone. ... Then when I leave I give him a kick ... for breaking my heart."

— Philomena Lynott

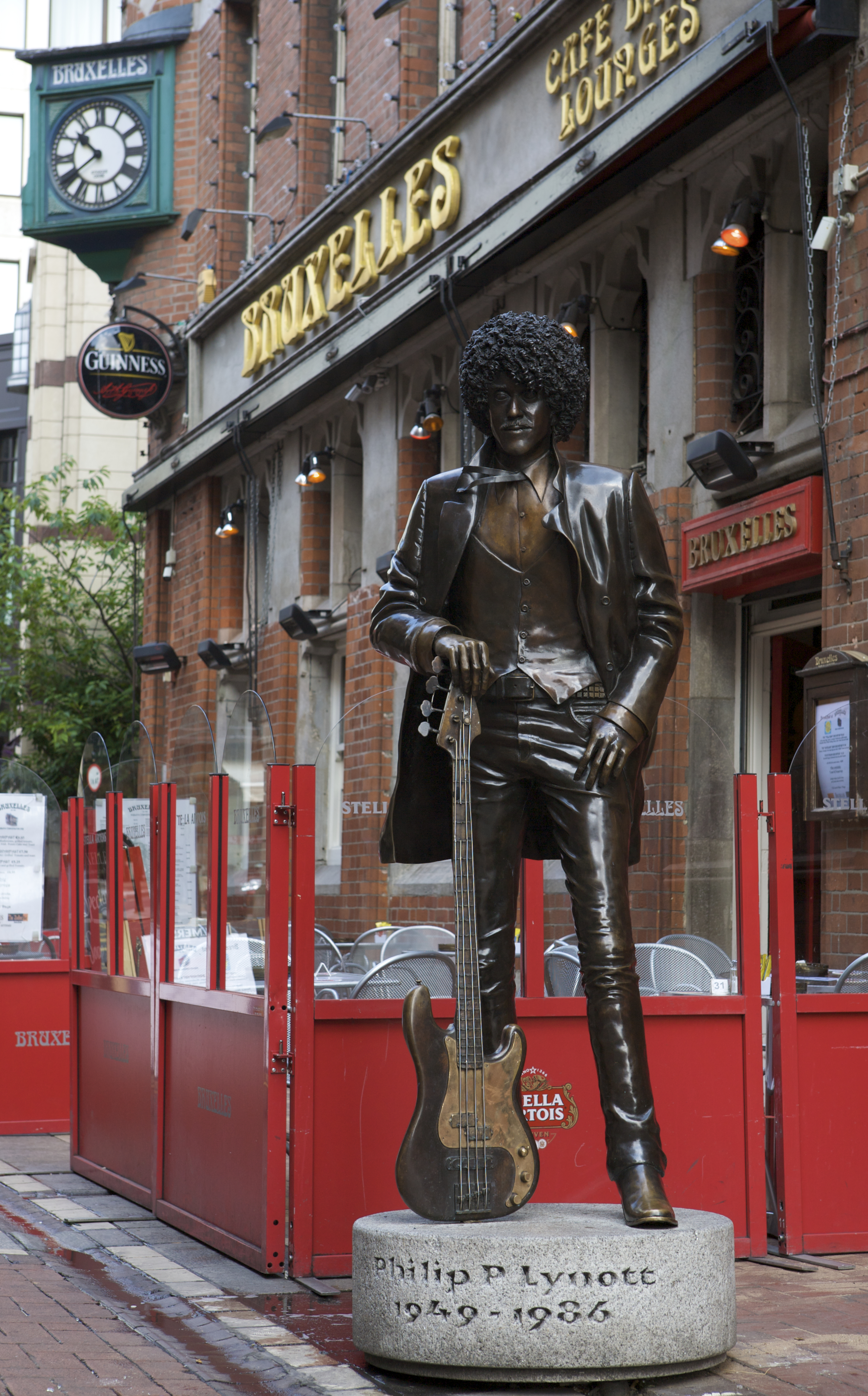
Statue of Lynott on Harry Street in Dublin, by Paul Daly

Thin Lizzy regrouped for a one-off performance in 1986, with Bob Geldof taking lead vocals, and reformed as a touring act in 1996. In 2012 the members of Thin Lizzy decided to record new material but chose to do so under the name of Black Star Riders as they and Lynott's widow felt uncomfortable about new Thin Lizzy recordings without Lynott.

Every January from 1987 to 2019, with a final event in 2023, Lynott's friend Smiley Bolger hosted a festival for him on the anniversary of his death, called the Vibe for Philo. A number of musicians performed at the festival, including Thin Lizzy tribute bands and, occasionally, former Thin Lizzy members.

=== Releases ===
Both Lynott's and Thin Lizzy's back catalogues have been re-released in expanded editions. In April 2007, the 1996 film The Rocker: A Portrait of Phil Lynott, which consisted mainly of archive footage, was released on DVD in the UK. In August 2010, Yellow Pearl was released. This is a collection of songs from Lynott's solo albums, B-sides and album tracks.

=== Family and trust ===
On 4 January 1994 a trust in Lynott's name was formed by his family and friends to provide scholarships for new musicians, and to make donations to charities and organisations in his memory.

Lynott's mother struggled to come to terms with her son's death and visited his grave on a regular basis. In September 2012, she, Scott Gorham and Lynott's widow objected to Mitt Romney's use of "The Boys Are Back in Town" during his election campaign. In an interview with Irish rock magazine Hot Press, Philomena said, "As far as I am concerned, Mitt Romney's opposition to gay marriage and to civil unions for gays makes him anti-gay – which is not something that Philip would have supported."

=== Memorials, stamps and coins ===
In 2005 a life-size bronze statue of Lynott by Dublin sculptor Paul Daly was unveiled on Harry Street, off Grafton Street in central Dublin. The ceremony was attended by Lynott's mother Philomena, who had worked with the Roisin Dubh Trust on the campaign for the statue, and by former band members Moore, Bell, Robertson, Downey, Gorham and Darren Wharton, who performed live.

On 3 October 2019 An Post released two commemorative stamps, with artwork by Jim Fitzpatrick, one of the Black Rose album cover, and one a portrait of Lynott. They were launched in the UK by Lynott's children and ex-wife. On 27 November 2019, the Central Bank of Ireland issued 3,000 €15 silver commemorative coins as part of the 'Modern Irish Musicians' series, commemorating the 70th anniversary of Lynott's birth in 1949. On 17 December 2020 a plaque was unveiled at his childhood home on Leighlin Road, Crumlin.

In 2019 a plaque was put up at Sandwell Hospital where Lynott was born. A bronze portrait bust of Lynott was installed in his birth town of West Bromwich and unveiled on what would have been his 72nd birthday on 20 August 2021. It was designed by local artist Luke Perry and crowdfunded by Thin Lizzy fans. However, it has been criticised for its lacking a likeness to Lynott.

=== Biographies and documentary ===
A biography by Niall Stokes was released in 2015, entitled Philip Lynott: Still In Love With You; a further biography, authorized by the Lynott family, Cowboy Song, was released in 2016. Other biographical accounts include Phil Lynott: The Rocker by Mark Putterford, Philip Lynott: Renegade of Thin Lizzy by Alan Byrne, and Tha Ballad of the Thin Mark: The Authorised Biography of Philip Lynott and Thin Lizzy by Stuart Bailie. Lynott's mother, Philomena, published My Boy: The Philip Lynott Story, an autobiographical volume with much content on Phil, in 1995.

A documentary taking its name from Lynott's poetry collection, Phil Lynott: Songs for While I'm Away, featuring interviews with people who knew Lynott and worked with him, and some of his admirers such as U2's Adam Clayton, was released in 2020.

== Musical style and equipment ==
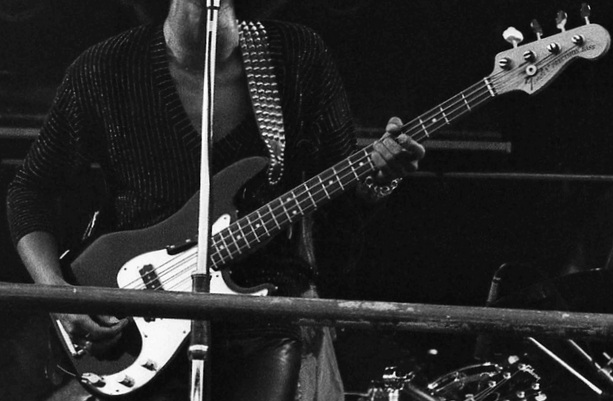
Lynott's Fender Precision Bass with a mirror pickguard

Lynott purchased a Fender Jazz Bass from Brush Shiels when starting Thin Lizzy. He used other basses early in the band's career, including a bi-amped Rickenbacker and an Ampeg Dan Armstrong lucite (see-thru) bass. His signature instrument was a black Fender Precision Bass, furnished with a mirror pickguard used frequently on stage and in videos. In the later part of Thin Lizzy's career onwards, he used an Ibanez Roadstar RS900.

When playing bass Lynott always used an attacking style with a pick, favoring eighth notes or triplets. His bass lines could be heard in the foreground and on top of the beat, signalling a "pushed" chord played slightly before the first beat of the next bar.

Lynott wrote the majority of Thin Lizzy's lyrics, often refining the words up until the last minute when vocals were ready to be recorded. A variety of themes and characters were featured, drawing from the Celtic heritage of Irish history. Death was a common theme, such as "Soldier of Fortune", "Massacre", "Killer on the Loose" and "Angel of Death". Early material in particular drew on personal experiences and family around Dublin. He began to include American themes into his lyrics, such as "Cowboy Song" and "Massacre", after Thin Lizzy began regularly touring the US. Several songs feature the character "Johnny", which Lynott used as an alter ego for himself. "The Boys are Back in Town" was written from the point of view of the band and the audience being in a gang together, which contributed to its success.

Lynott's singing style set him apart among hard rock musicians, with a seemingly casual sense of off-the-beat phrasing "closer to folk or jazz."

== Discography ==
=== Albums ===
Date	Title	Type	UK chart	Irish chart
1980	Solo in Soho	Studio	28	
1982	The Philip Lynott Album	Studio		40
2001	Live in Sweden 1983	Live		
2006	The Lost Recordings	EP		
2010	Yellow Pearl	Greatest hits		

=== Albums with Thin Lizzy ===
Date	Title	UK chart
1971	Thin Lizzy	
1972	Shades of a Blue Orphanage	
1973	Vagabonds of the Western World	
1974	Nightlife	
1975	Fighting	60
1976	Jailbreak	10
1976	Johnny the Fox	11
1977	Bad Reputation	4
1978	Live and Dangerous	2
1979	Black Rose: A Rock Legend	2
1980	Chinatown	7
1981	Renegade	38
1983	Thunder and Lightning	4

=== Singles ===
Date	Title	Album	UK chart	AUS chart
1979	"Parisienne Walkways" / "Fanatical Fascists" (Gary Moore & Phil Lynott)	Back on the Streets	8	–
1979	"Spanish Guitar" (Gary Moore & Phil Lynott)	Back on the Streets		–
1980	"Dear Miss Lonely Hearts"	Solo in Soho	32	–
1980	"King's Call"	Solo in Soho	35	82
1981	"Yellow Pearl" (Top of the Pops theme)	Solo in Soho	14	–
1982	"Together"	The Philip Lynott Album		–
1982	"Old Town"	The Philip Lynott Album		–
1985	"Out in the Fields" / "Military Man" / "Still in Love with You" (Gary Moore & Phil Lynott)	Run for Cover	5	62
1985	"Nineteen"	Non-album single	76	–

=== Collaborations ===
Date	Title	Projects	Label	Notes
1969	New Faces, Old Places/ Misdemeanour Dreams Felicity	Skid Row		Single, appears on "New Faces, Old Places"
1973	A Tribute to Deep Purple	Funky Junction		
1978	Jeff Wayne's Musical Version of The War of the Worlds	Jeff Wayne	Columbia	As Parson Nathaniel
1978	Back on the Streets	Gary Moore	MCA	Appears on "Back on the Streets", "Don't Believe a Word", "Fanatical Fascists", "Parisienne Walkways" and "Spanish Guitar"
1982	"Please Don't Leave Me"	John Sykes	MCA	Single, features Thin Lizzy band members
1985	Run for Cover	Gary Moore	Virgin	Appears on "Military Man", "Out in the Fields" and "Still in Love with You"

=== Other contributions ===
- Gary Moore and Friends: One Night in Dublin: A Tribute to Phil Lynott (Eagle Rock Entertainment, 2006)

== See also ==
- Black people in Ireland
