= The Boys Are Back in Town =

1976 song by Irish rock band

- 1991 Re-release UK 7-inch single

Single by Thin Lizzy

from the album Jailbreak
- B-side: "Emerald" or "Jailbreak"
- Released: April 1976
- Studio: Ramport, London
- Genre: Rock; hard rock
- Length: 4:29 (album version); 3:11 (single version)
- Label: Vertigo (UK); Mercury (US)
- Songwriter: Phil Lynott
- Producer: John Alcock

Thin Lizzy singles chronology
| "Wild One" (1975) | "The Boys Are Back in Town" (1976) | "Jailbreak" (1976) |

"The Boys Are Back in Town" is a song by Irish hard rock band Thin Lizzy. The song was released in 1976 as the first single from their album Jailbreak. It is considered by Rolling Stone to be the band's best song, placing it at No. 272 on the 2021 edition of the "500 Greatest Songs of All Time" list.

== Lyrical content ==
There are many unconfirmed theories regarding the inspiration behind the lyrics to "The Boys Are Back in Town". One theory is that it is about a group of Manchester criminals collectively known as the Quality Street Gang.

== Single release information ==
The original 1976 UK single release featured the album track "Emerald" as a B-side, although in some territories "Jailbreak" was chosen. The single was remixed and re-released in several formats in March 1991, after the success of the "Dedication" single, reaching No. 63 in the UK. The 12" EP featured the extra tracks "Johnny the Fox Meets Jimmy the Weed", "Black Boys on the Corner" and a live version of "Me and the Boys".

Shortly after the UK single release of "The Boys Are Back In Town" BBC Radio 1 Disc Jockey Tony Blackburn picked this single as his 'Record of the Week', receiving daily plays during his mid morning show.

== Reception ==
"It was 1976 and we were touring America", recalled Scott Gorham. "Jailbreak wasn't shifting and we weren't selling any tickets". The band were surprised to learn from their manager that "The Boys Are Back in Town" was becoming a hit record, especially as the track had not been among the ten songs originally chosen by the band for the album. Gorham attributed the song's unexpected success to two DJs in Louisville, Kentucky who "played it incessantly until other stations in the surrounding area picked up on it… Had that song not kickstarted the sales of the album, then the band was over."

The song won a 1976 NME Award for Best Single.

It was given 499th position among the 2004 Rolling Stone's 500 Greatest Songs of All Time, though was not included in the 2010 update. However, it re-entered the list in the 2021 update at an even higher position than before at number 272. Rolling Stone praised lead singer and bassist Phil Lynott's "Gaelic soul" and said the "twin-guitar lead by Scott Gorham and Brian Robertson" was "crucial to the song's success". In March 2005, Q magazine placed "The Boys Are Back in Town" at No. 38 in its list of the 100 Greatest Guitar Tracks.

== Other uses ==
At the 2012 Republican National Convention, the song was used to introduce then vice-presidential candidate Paul Ryan on stage. This unauthorised use of the song caused controversy. Both Lynott's mother, Philomena Lynott, and Thin Lizzy lead guitarist Gorham criticised its use, suggesting that Lynott would not have wanted his music used for any political purpose, including endorsing politicians, and furthermore would likely have objected to the policies of Ryan and his running mate Mitt Romney.

The song is played at most Irish rugby matches. It has also been used for trailers and TV spots to promote the Toy Story franchise.

== Charts ==
=== Weekly charts ===
| Chart (1976–1977) | Peak position |
|---|---|
| Australian Singles (Kent Music Report) | 55 |
| Canada Top Singles (RPM) | 8 |
| Ireland (IRMA) | 1 |
| UK Singles (Official Charts) | 8 |
| US Billboard Hot 100 | 12 |

1991 reissue

| Chart (1991) | Peak position |
|---|---|
| Ireland (IRMA) | 16 |
| UK Singles (Official Charts) | 63 |

=== Year-end charts ===
| Chart (1976) | Position |
|---|---|
| Canada Top Singles (RPM) | 93 |
| US Billboard Hot 100 | 87 |
| US Cash Box | 91 |

== Certifications ==
| Region | Certification | Certified units/sales |
|---|---|---|
| Denmark (IFPI Danmark) | Gold | 45,000^{‡} |
| New Zealand (RMNZ) | Platinum | 30,000^{‡} |
| United Kingdom (BPI) | Platinum | 600,000^{‡} |
^{‡} Sales+streaming figures based on certification alone.

== Cover versions ==
=== Happy Mondays version ===
A cover version of "The Boys Are Back in Town" became the last Top 40 single for the Manchester rock band Happy Mondays when it peaked at number 24 in the UK Singles Chart in May 1999. According to the band they did not think that their version was a straight cover, but a record "inspired by the Phil Lynott song, but doesn't sound a thing like the original".
