= Solo in Soho =

- Cover photo by John Swannell

Studio album by Philip Lynott
- Released: 18 April 1980
- Recorded: Winter 1979–early 1980
- Studios: Good Earth Studios, Soho, London, Compass Point Studios, Nassau, The Bahamas
- Genre: Rock
- Length: 35:47
- Labels: Vertigo (Europe and Japan); Mercury (Canada); Warner Bros. (US)
- Producers: Philip Lynott, Kit Woolven

Philip Lynott chronology
Solo in Soho (1980)	The Philip Lynott Album (1982)

Singles from Solo in Soho
- 1. "Dear Miss Lonely Hearts" Released: March 1980; 2. "King's Call" Released: June 1980; 3. "Yellow Pearl" Released: December 1980

Professional ratings
Review scores
Source	Rating
AllMusic	4/5 stars
Collector's Guide to Heavy Metal	9/10
Hot Press	(mixed)
Music Week	4/4 stars
Smash Hits	5/10

Solo in Soho is the debut solo album by Irish rock singer/songwriter Philip Lynott, released on 18 April 1980 while he was still a member of Thin Lizzy. Current and former Lizzy members guested on the album, including Scott Gorham, Brian Downey, Snowy White, and Gary Moore. Brian Robertson also contributed to the writing of one of the tracks, "Girls".

== Guest musicians ==
Dire Straits frontman Mark Knopfler plays on the single "King's Call", a lament to Elvis Presley. Huey Lewis plays harmonica on "Tattoo (Giving It All Up for Love)" and "Ode to a Black Man". The latter track is devoted to Iconic African, or African diaspora freedom fighters of the 20th century, including Malcolm X, Rastafari, Haile Selassie, Bob Marley, Jimi Hendrix and other socially aware or politically conscious blues/R&B artists from history, such as Robert Johnson and Motown singer Stevie Wonder. Lewis later covered "Tattoo" on the 1982 Huey Lewis and the News album Picture This, titled "Giving It All Up for Love".

== Yellow Pearl ==
"Yellow Pearl" was released as a single in two remixed versions; the first of these was used from 1981 until 1986 as the theme tune for the popular BBC TV music programme Top of the Pops. This version was later included on Lynott's second solo album, The Philip Lynott Album.

== Critical reception ==
Billboard gave the album a positive review, saying that Lynott's "lyrics have special appeal" and adding: "There is nothing here even vaguely similar to the dramatic rock energy of "The Boys Are Back in Town" yet this is a bold and interesting batch of tunes aided by uncluttered arrangements and sound playing".

== Track listing ==
All songs by Philip Lynott, except where noted.

Side one

1. "Dear Miss Lonely Hearts" (Lynott, Jimmy Bain) – 4:11
2. "King's Call" – 3:40
3. "A Child's Lullaby" – 2:43
4. "Tattoo (Giving It All Up for Love)" – 3:21
5. "Solo in Soho" – 4:15

Side two

6. "Girls" (Lynott, Bain, Brian Robertson) – 4:00
7. "Yellow Pearl" (Lynott, Midge Ure) – 4:06
8. "Ode to a Black Man" – 4:06
9. "Jamaican Rum" – 2:43
10. "Talk in 79" – 3:00

== Singles ==
- "Dear Miss Lonely Hearts" / "Solo in Soho" – 7" / 12" (1980)
- "King's Call" / "Ode to a Black Man" – 7" (1980)
- "Yellow Pearl" / "Girls" – 7" / 12" (1981)

== Personnel ==
- Philip Lynott – bass guitar, rhythm guitar, keyboards, Minimoog, vocoder, string machine, percussion, vocals, producer
- Scott Gorham – guitars (tracks 1, 4, 8)
- Snowy White – guitars (tracks 1, 5)
- Mark Knopfler – electric guitar (track 2)
- Gary Moore – guitar (track 9)
- Jerome Rimson – bass guitar (track 5)
- Huey Lewis – harmonica (tracks 4, 8)
- Fiachra Trench – string and brass arrangements (tracks 3, 4)
- Jimmy Bain – piano, Minimoog, string machine (track 6)
- Billy Currie – ARP synthesizer (track 7)
- Midge Ure – ARP synthesizer, Minimoog, string machine (track 7)
- Brian Downey – drums, percussion (track 1, 2, 4, 5, 7, 9)
- Bob C Benberg – drums, percussion (track 6)
- Mark Nauseef – drums, percussion (tracks 8, 10)
- Tony Charles – steel drums (track 9)
- Andy Duncan – percussion (tracks 3 and 5)
- Julia – backing vocals (track 5)
- Lena – backing vocals (track 6, 7)
- Sophie, Margi, Silver, Christine – backing vocals (track 6)

=== Production ===
- Kit Woolven – producer, engineer
- Tony Visconti, "Flash" Gordon Fordyce, Will Reid-Dick – engineers
- Ian Cooper – mastering
- Chris O'Donnell – art direction
- Linda Sutton, Roger Cooper – artwork and design
- John Swannell – photography

== Charts ==
Chart (1980)	Peak position
Norwegian Albums (VG-lista)	22
Swedish Albums (Sverigetopplistan)	6
UK Albums (Official Charts)	28
