= Darren Wharton =

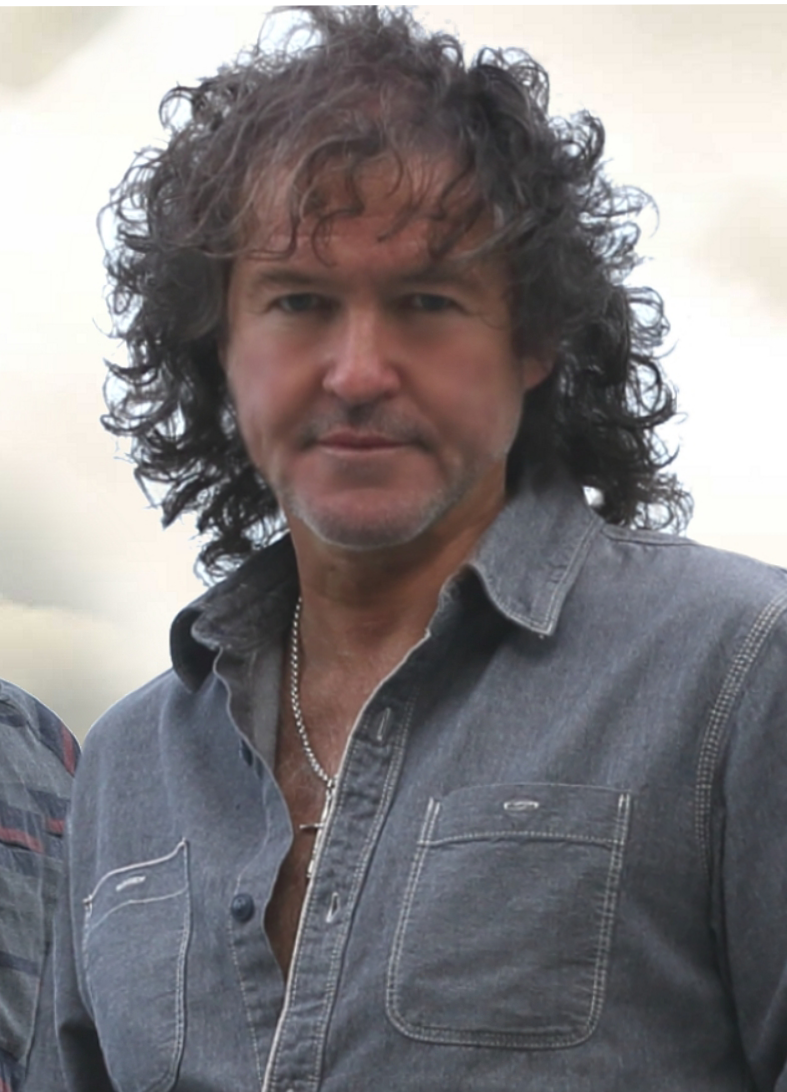
- Wharton in 2020

Background information
- Born: Darren Leigh Wharton; 25 December 1961 (age 64); Failsworth, Lancashire, England, UK
- Genres: Rock, hard rock, heavy metal
- Occupations: Musician, songwriter
- Instruments: Vocals, keyboards
- Years active: 1979–present
- Label: Legend Records (current)
- Member of: Thin Lizzy, Dare, Darren Wharton's Renegade
- Website: darebandofficial.com

Darren Leigh Wharton (born 25 December 1961) is a British keyboardist, singer and songwriter. He has fronted his own band, Dare, since 1985, but first came to attention as a member of Thin Lizzy. In 2023, Wharton launched a second band alongside Dare, Darren Wharton's Renegade. His son, Paris, is also a musician.

== Biography ==
Wharton was born in Failsworth, Lancashire in 1961. He was playing keyboards for a band in London clubs when he auditioned for Thin Lizzy. Thin Lizzy had not had a permanent keyboard player since their early gigs, but following the final departure of Gary Moore from the band on 4 July 1979, Midge Ure (who had prior plans to join Ultravox) stepped in to help Thin Lizzy complete their touring commitments. Before a tour of Japan beginning in September 1979, Dave Flett joined the band to enable Ure to switch to playing keyboards where necessary. Ure was still acting as a temporary keyboard player at gigs in early 1980, but when he left to join Ultravox full-time, Lynott decided to look for a permanent keyboard player. Wharton got the job, initially on a temporary basis. He was only 18 when he contributed keyboards to their 1980 album Chinatown. By the following year on the album Renegade he had become an official member of the band, co writing the opening track "Angel of Death" with Lynott.

Wharton continued with the band on the follow-up Thunder And Lightning in 1983, having a greater share in the writing credits, including the band's final single "The Sun Goes Down", but that year Lynott announced the break-up of Thin Lizzy.

Wharton also worked with Lynott on the latter's 1982 solo recording The Philip Lynott Album where he played on most of the record's eleven tracks, and provided the piano solo on the single "Old Town". In 1999 Darren reunited with Thin Lizzy touring Europe and the US documented on the 2000 live album One Night Only.

Wharton formed his own band, Dare in 1985, releasing the album Out of the Silence in 1988. This was followed in 1991 by Blood from Stone. Following a move to North Wales in 1992, the Dare sound reflected definite Celtic influences on the 1998 album release, Calm Before The Storm. Wharton then formed his own record label, Legend Records. The 2001 Dare album Belief was featured on Terry Wogan's BBC Radio 2 breakfast show when the single "White Horses" was played every week for three months. In 2004, now signed to Warners ADA Music, Dare released their Beneath the Shining Water album. The first single "Sea of Roses" was again playlisted by Terry Wogan on BBC Radio Two. 2009 saw the release of Dare's sixth studio album Arc of the Dawn.

After John Sykes' departure from Thin Lizzy in 2009, Scott Gorham set to work on creating a new line-up of Thin Lizzy, announced in May 2010. Wharton rejoined Lizzy as did original drummer Brian Downey, and original post-Lynott bass guitarist Marco Mendoza. New to the line-up were vocalist Ricky Warwick of The Almighty and Def Leppard guitarist Vivian Campbell, although the latter was subsequently replaced by Richard Fortus and then Damon Johnson.

Thin Lizzy toured extensively between 2010 and 2013, and began work on their first studio album since 1983, although it was ultimately decided not to release any new material as Thin Lizzy. Under the name of Black Star Riders, the album was released as All Hell Breaks Loose in May 2013, with Wharton co-writing the title track and the album closer "Blues Ain't So Bad". However, Wharton decided against joining Black Star Riders in order to concentrate on Dare and other projects.

He released his seventh Dare studio album Calm Before the Storm 2 on 1 October 2012. His son, Paris, taking on lead guitar duties on the track "Circles" from the album Arc of the Dawn. In March 2016, Wharton stated that mixing of the new Dare album, Sacred Ground, had begun. Sacred Ground was released in July 2016. The album topped the Amazon Rock Charts in the UK, Germany, Spain and Italy, and received predominantly positive reviews, albeit these usually genre-specific. 'Sacred Ground' is considered to consist of keyboard and guitar framed music that while not losing them, do take a step back from earlier Celtic influences, leaning more towards straight ahead moody AOR. In May 2018 it was revealed on Dare's official Facebook page that a new Dare album, Out of the Silence II, would be released on 29 June 2018. Also in May 2018 a new official website for Dare was launched.

The latest Dare album (non-compilation), Road To Eden was announced by the band on 10 January 2022, with a release date by Legend Records of 1 April 2022. An initial track from the album (the lead track), Born in the Storm was announced at the same time. Line up for the album remained Darren Wharton (vocals and keyboards), Vinny Burns (guitars), Kevin Whitehead (drums), Nigel Clutterbuck (bass) and Marc Roberts (keyboards).

In June 2025 Dare released their first compilation album, The Best Of Dare. On Darren Wharton's Legend Records label, this double CD features 34 tracks selected by the band from the entire Dare back catalogue.

== Darren Wharton's Renegade ==
In September 2023 Wharton announced the formation of a new band, Darren Wharton's Renegade. He confirmed that this new band would not impact on the activities of Dare, stating at the time that Dare were already adding live dates for 2024, were engaged in re-recording the Blood from Stone album, as well as writing songs for a new Dare studio album.

The new band, named after Wharton's second album with Thin Lizzy, was created to celebrate the music of Thin Lizzy and Phil Lynott and live shows feature songs from the Renegade, Chinatown and Thunder & Lighting albums, plus all the greatest hits of Thin Lizzy. Renegade consists of Darren Wharton on lead vocals, Vinny Burns and Andy Moore on lead guitars, Nigel Clutterbuck on bass guitar, and Greg Morgan on drums. Burns, Clutterbuck and Morgan are also members of Dare.

Renegade played Hard Rock Hell AOR X at Vauxhall Holiday Park, Great Yarmouth on Thursday 3rd March 2024 as one of the scheduled bands pulled out so Renegade replaced them. The band then continued to tour through 2025, and by December 2025 had confirmed a number of 2026 dates including an appearance at Steelhouse Live (24-26 July) in support of Twisted Sister, and a 4th January 2026 appearance at the 3Arena in Dublin for The Dedication to Philip Parris Lynott 40th Anniversay.

== Discography ==
=== with Thin Lizzy ===
- Chinatown (1980)
- Renegade (1981)
- Thunder and Lightning (1983)
- Life Live (1983)
- One Night Only Live (2000)

=== with Philip Lynott ===
- The Philip Lynott Album (1982)

=== with Dare ===
- Out of the Silence (1988)
- Blood from Stone (1991)
- Calm Before the Storm (1998)
- Belief (2001)
- Beneath the Shining Water (2004)
- The Power of Nature: Live in Munich (2005)
- Arc of the Dawn (2009)
- Calm Before the Storm 2 (2012)
- Sacred Ground (2016)
- Out of the Silence II (2018)
- Road to Eden (2022)
- The Best of Dare (compilation 2CD) (2025)
