= Brian Downey (drummer) =

Irish drummer (born 1951)

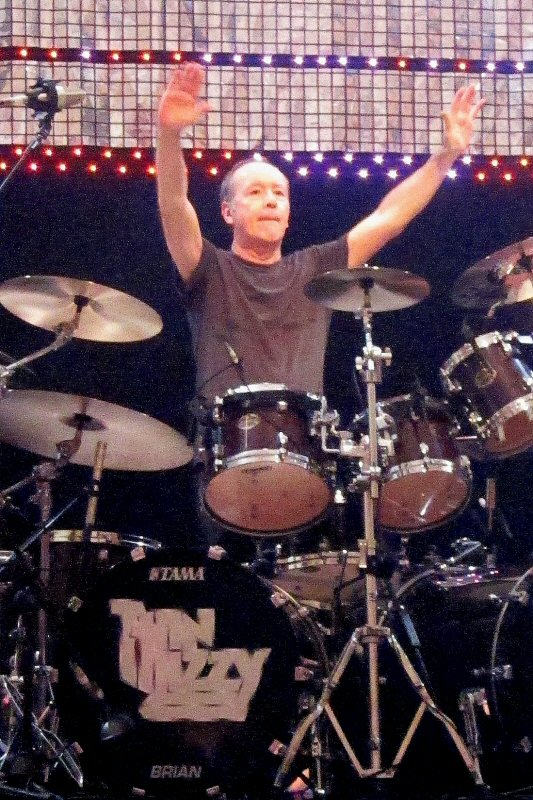
- Downey performing with Thin Lizzy in 2011

Background information
- Born: Brian Michael Downey; 27 January 1951 (age 75); Dublin, Ireland
- Genres: Hard rock, blues rock, heavy metal
- Occupation: Drummer
- Years active: 1967–present
- Formerly of: Thin Lizzy, Funky Junction

Brian Michael Downey (born 27 January 1951) is an Irish drummer. He was a founding member of the rock band Thin Lizzy and the only other constant in the band aside from leader Phil Lynott until their disbandment in 1983. Downey also co-wrote several Thin Lizzy songs. Allmusic critic Eduardo Rivadavia has argued that Downey is "certainly one of the most underrated [rock drummers] of his generation".

== Career ==
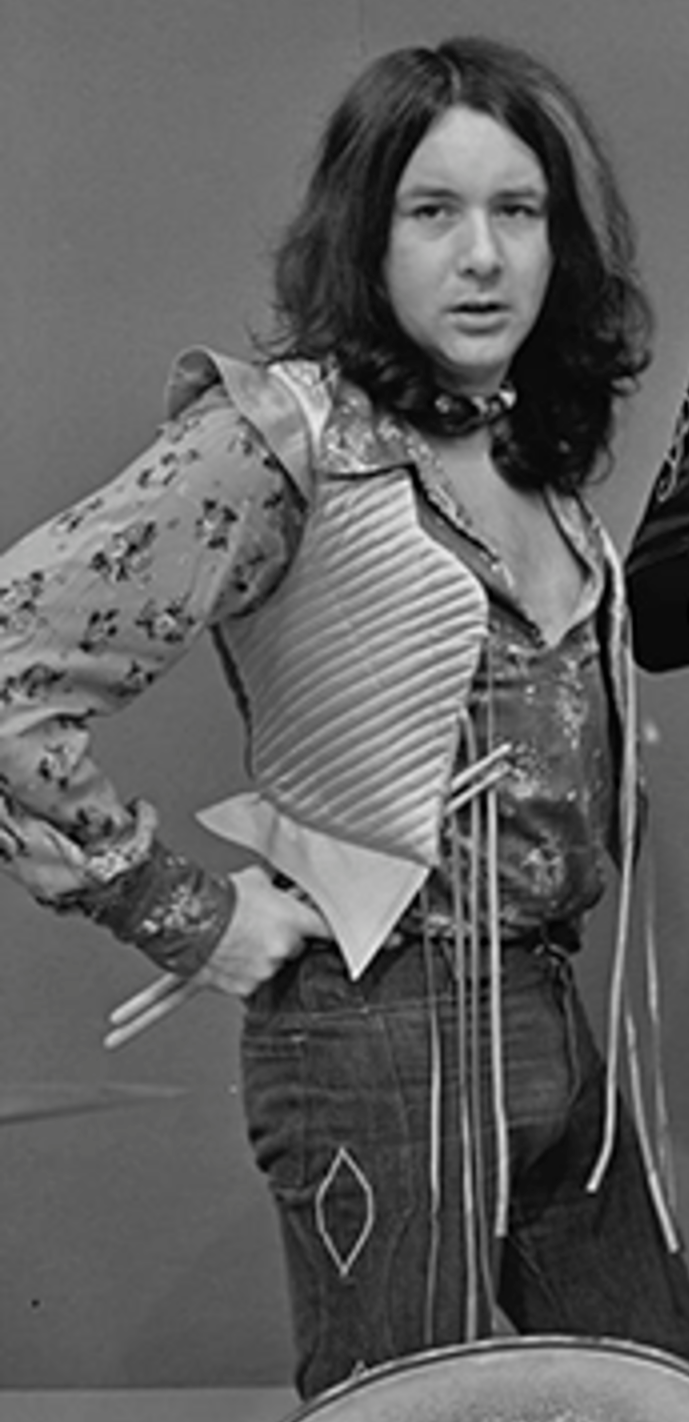
Downey in a 1974 television show

Growing up in Crumlin, Dublin, Brian's early musical influences came from his father who played in a local pipe band and loved jazz, and also from his 1960s heroes: the Kinks, the Beatles and the Rolling Stones. In his youth, Downey met friend, co-founder and bass guitarist Phil Lynott, who attended the same school. Before forming Thin Lizzy, Downey had been in numerous school bands, beginning with the Liffey Beats, Mod Con Cave Dwellers, and briefly the Black Eagles (with Lynott). He moved on to performing in a local band, Sugar Shack, and then was persuaded by Lynott to join him in another band, Orphanage. Upon meeting guitarist Eric Bell, the trio formed Thin Lizzy. Although the line-up of musicians within the band changed over the years, with the exception of Lynott, for the next thirteen years Downey remained the only other permanent member of the band, as well as drumming on Lynott's solo albums.

After Lynott's death in 1986, Downey played in the tribute Thin Lizzy line-up with John Sykes, Scott Gorham, Darren Wharton, and Marco Mendoza, but had been absent from subsequent Thin Lizzy touring bands. After Sykes' departure from the group in 2009, guitarist Scott Gorham formed another Thin Lizzy line-up. Downey, Mendoza, and Wharton rejoined, along with two new members: Def Leppard guitarist Vivian Campbell and former vocalist from the Almighty, Ricky Warwick. This version of Thin Lizzy began an extensive world tour in January 2010 and continued touring until early 2013, with new permanent guitarist Damon Johnson eventually replacing Richard Fortus. Gorham had stated that the band members were considering recording new material, and this project eventually emerged under the Black Star Riders name, with which Downey chose not to be involved due to the pressures of consistent touring.

Downey was a guest at the unveiling of Lynott's statue in 2005 and drummed for Gary Moore at the tribute concert that followed. Downey also appeared on Moore's 2007 album, Close As You Get, and on Moore's subsequent tour.

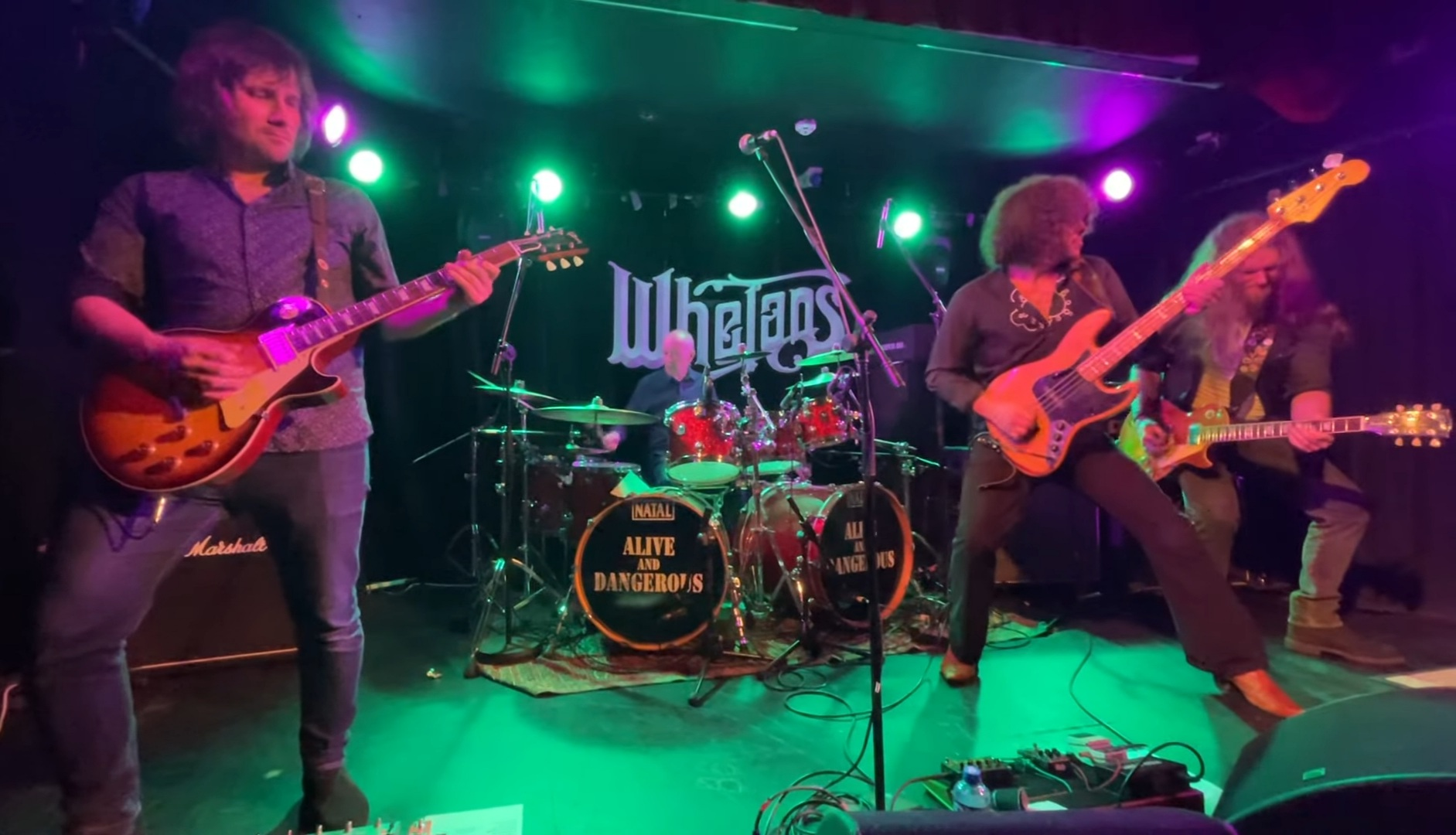
Brian Downey's Alive and Dangerous in 2022

In early 2016, Downey formed a trio, later a four-piece band, called Brian Downey's Alive and Dangerous. The quartet initially consisted of Downey, bassist/lead vocalist Matt Wilson, and guitarists Brian Grace and Phil Edgar. The band have toured the UK and Europe, and mostly perform Thin Lizzy songs. Grace and Edgar have since been replaced by two new guitarists, Michal Kulbaka and Joe Merriman.

== Discography ==
=== With Thin Lizzy ===
- Thin Lizzy (1971)
- Shades of a Blue Orphanage (1972)
- Vagabonds of the Western World (1973)
- Nightlife (1974)
- Fighting (1975)
- Jailbreak (1976)
- Johnny the Fox (1976)
- Bad Reputation (1977)
- Live and Dangerous (1978)
- Black Rose: A Rock Legend (1979)
- Chinatown (1980)
- Renegade (1981)
- Thunder and Lightning (1983)
- Life (1983)

=== Other albums ===
- Funky Junction – A Tribute to Deep Purple (1973)
- Gary Moore – Back on the Streets (1978)
- Phil Lynott – Solo in Soho (1980)
- Phil Lynott – The Philip Lynott Album (1982)
- John Sykes – "Please Don't Leave Me" (1982)
- Various Artists – Straight to Hell (1987)
- The Baby Snakes – Sweet Hunger (1988)
- Don Baker – Almost Illegal (1989)
- Gary Moore – After the War (1989)
- Gary Moore – Still Got the Blues (1990)
- Spirit Nation – Spirit Nation (1992)
- Blues Up Front – All the Way from Dublin (1999)
- Gary Moore – Close as You Get (2007)
