= John Williamson discography =

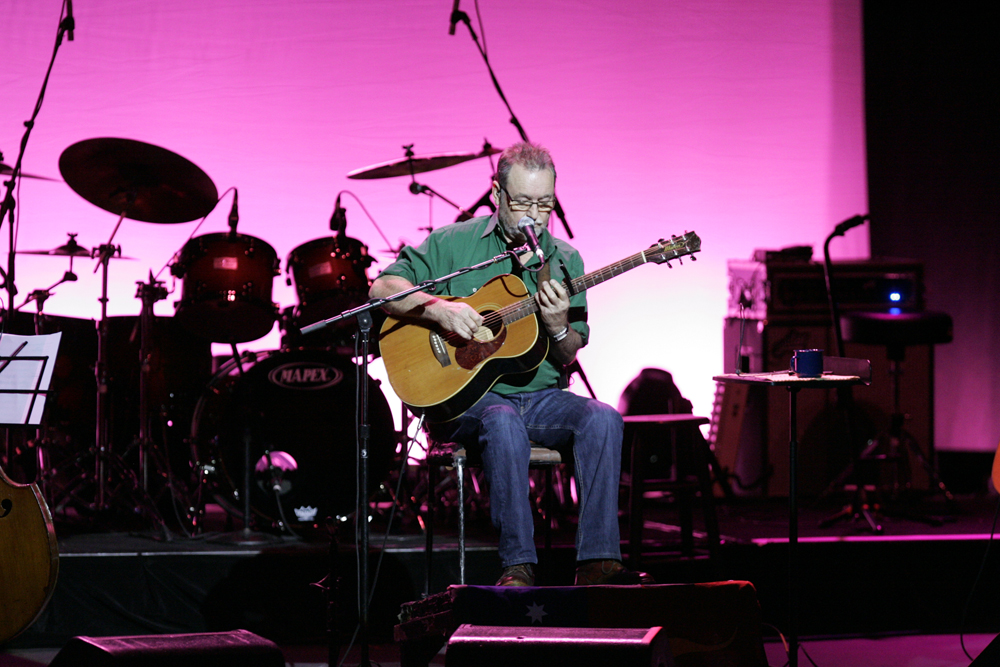
- John Williamson in 2012
- Studio albums: 21
- EPs: 3
- Live albums: 8
- Compilation albums: 25
- Soundtracks: 1
- Box sets: 1

The discography of John Williamson, an Australian singer-songwriter, consists of twenty-one studio albums, twenty-five compilation album, eight live album, three EPs. Williamson has sold over 5 million records in Australia.

== Albums ==
=== Studio albums ===
Title	Album details	Chart positions	Certifications (sales thresholds)
Title	Album details	AUS	Certifications (sales thresholds)
John Williamson	Released: 1970; Label: Fable (FBSA-001)	—	
Comic Strip Cowboy	Released: 1976; Label: Mercury (6357 037)	—	
Road to Town	Released: 1978; Label: Mercury (6357 057)	—	
Fair Dinkum J.W.	Released: 1982; Label: Festival (L37940); Re-released as Bound for Botany Bay in 1996	142	
Road Thru the Heart	Released: 1985; Label: Festival (L38498)	—	
Mallee Boy	Released: November 1986; Label: Gumleaf / Festival (RMC 53221)	9	ARIA: 3× Platinum
Boomerang Café	Released: April 1988; Label: Gumleaf / Festival (RMC 53260)	10	
Warragul	Released: September 1989; Label: Gumleaf / Festival (RMC 53308)	1	ARIA: 2× Platinum
JW's Family Album	Released: October 1990; Label: Gumleaf / EMI Music (8140232)	21	ARIA: Platinum
Waratah St	Released: September 1991; Label: Gumleaf / Festival (RMC 53347)	14	ARIA: Platinum
Mulga to Mangoes	Released: August 1994; Label: Gumleaf / EMI (8301732)	14	ARIA: Gold
Family Album No.2	Released: September 1996; Label: Gumleaf / EMI	100	
Pipe Dream	Released: August 1997; Label: Gumleaf / EMI (8590492)	6	ARIA: Platinum
The Way It Is	Released: July 1999; Label: Gumleaf / EMI (5215152)	10	ARIA: Platinum
Gunyah	Released: 22 April 2002; Label: Gumleaf / EMI (5391724)	20	ARIA: Gold
Chandelier of Stars	Released: August 2005; Label: Gumleaf / EMI (094633367128)	11	ARIA: Gold
Hillbilly Road	Released: 16 August 2008; Label: Warner Music Australia (2163402)	6	ARIA: Gold
The Big Red	Released: 27 January 2012; Label: Warner (5310507502)	15	
Honest People	Released: 25 July 2014; Label: Warner (5419624992)	11	
Butcherbird	Released: 24 August 2018; Label: Warner (5419702417)	13	
How Many Songs	Released: 4 April 2025; Label: Warner (2173259604)	51	

=== Live albums ===
Title	Album details	Chart positions	Certifications (sales thresholds)
Title	Album details	AUS	Certifications (sales thresholds)
Travlin' Out West in Concert (with Emma Hannah, Ricky And Tammy)	Released: 1973; Label: Reg Grundy Productions (TOW 1001)	—	
From Travlin' Out West (with Emma Hannah, Ricky And Tammy)	Released: 1974; Label: Reg Grundy Productions (TOW 1002)	—	
Singing in the Suburbs	Released: 1983; Label: Festival (L38100); Re-released as John Williamson Live in 1996 and Waltzing Matilda Live in 2000.	—	
The Smell of Gum Leaves	Released: September 1984; Label: Festival (L38245); Re-released as Home Among the Gumtrees in 1997	49	
John Williamson for Aussie Kids	Released: November 1998; Label: EMI	151	
Boogie with M'Baby	Released: 1998; Label: EMI; Re-released as Old Farts in Caravan Parks in 2003.	—	
Mates on the Road (with Pixie Jenkins, Warren H. Williams)	Released: 23 February 2004; Label: EMI (5981832)	98	
John Williamson in Symphony (with he Sydney Symphony)	Released: January 2011; Format: CD / DVD; Label: EMI (0944772)	— (Note: John Williamson in Symphony did not enter the ARIA Albums Chart, but peaked at number two on the ARIA Music DVD Chart.)	ARIA: Platinum

=== Soundtrack albums ===
Title	Album details
Quambatook	Released: February 2008; Label:

=== Compilation albums ===
Title	Album details	Chart positions	Certifications (sales thresholds)
Title	Album details	AUS	Certifications (sales thresholds)
Radio Special	Released: 1978; Label: Mercury (JW-001)	—	
Country Greats	Released: 1978; Label: Mercury (9199635)	—	
True Blue – The Best of John Williamson	Released: 1982; Label: Festival (L37788); Re-released as Old Man Emu in 1997	—	
Humble Beginnings	Released: 1985; 2×LP; Label: Festival (L45945)	133	
All the Best!	Released: July 1986; Label: Festival (RMC 53190)	27	
Australia Calling – All the Best Vol 2	Released: October 1992; Label: EMI Music (7806442)	32	ARIA: Platinum
Love Is a Good Woman	Released: November 1993; Label: EMI Music (8279112)	123	
True Blue – The Very Best of John Williamson	Released: November 1995; 2x CD; Label: EMI Music (8146312)	21	ARIA: 3× Platinum
Country Classics	Released: 1997; 3×CD; Label: Reader's Digest (0350806)	—	
The Spirit of Australia	Released: 1998; Label: Steve Parish/ EMI (9314954005143)	—	
Wandering Australia	Released: 1998; Label: Steve Parish/ EMI (9314954005181)	—	
The Glory of Australia	Released: 1999; Label: Steve Parish/ EMI (9319775912021)	—	
Laugh Along with John Williamson	Released: 1999; Label: Steve Parish/ EMI (9319775912229)	—	
Australia	Released: 1999; Label: Reader's Digest (0350782)	—	
Anthems – A Celebration of Australia	Released: August 2000; Label: Gumleaf/ EMI (724352768127)	16	ARIA: Gold
True Blue Two	Released: August 2003; Label: Gumleaf/ EMI (724359238326)	8	ARIA: Gold
From Bulldust to Bitumen: 20 Queensland Songs	Released: 2005; Label: Gumleaf	—	
We Love this Country	Released: 31 October 2005; Label: Gumleaf, EMI (3119932)	—	
Country Classics 2	Released: 2006; Format: 2×CD; Label: Reader's Digest (0351275)	—	
The Platinum Collection	Released: 26 August 2006; Format: 3×CD; Label: Gumleaf (3736262)	25	ARIA: Platinum
Wildlife Warriors	Released: 25 November 2006; Label: EMI Music (3826912)	78	
Absolute Greatest: 40 Years True Blue	Released: March 2010; Format: 2×CD; Label: EMI (6274852)	23	ARIA: Gold
Hell of a Career	Released: 19 July 2013; Format: 2×CD; Label: Warner Music Australia (5310584302)	24	
His Favourite Collection	Released: 19 August 2016; Format: 4×CD; Label: Warner (5419724752)	9	
JW Bangers	Released: November 2022; Format: LP (limited edition); Label: Warner Music Australia (5419714826)	—	

=== Box sets ===
Title	Album details	Chart positions
Title	Album details	AUS
JW Winding Back 1970-2020	Released: 19 June 2020; Format: 25×CD singles; Label: Warner	50

=== Chronological list of all albums ===
1. John Williamson (1970)
2. Travlin' Out West in Concert (1973)
3. From Travlin' Out West (1974)
4. Comic Strip Cowboy (1976)
5. Road to Town (1978)
6. Radio Special (1978)
7. Country Greats (1978)
8. Fair Dinkum J.W. (1982)
9. True Blue – The Best of John Williamson (1982)
10. Singing in the Suburbs (1983)
11. The Smell of Gum Leaves (1984)
12. Humble Beginnings (1985)
13. Road Thru the Heart (1985)
14. All the Best! (1986)
15. Mallee Boy (1986)
16. Boomerang Café (1988)
17. Warragul (1989)
18. JW's Family Album (1990)
19. Waratah St (1991)
20. Australia Calling – All the Best Vol 2 (1992)
21. Love Is a Good Woman (1993)
22. Mulga to Mangoes (1994)
23. True Blue – The Very Best of John Williamson (1995)
24. Family Album No.2 (1996)
25. Pipe Dream (1997)
26. Country Classics (1997)
27. The Spirit of Australia (1998)
28. Wandering Australia (1998)
29. John Williamson for Aussie Kids (1998)
30. Boogie with M'Baby (1998)
31. The Glory of Australia (1999)
32. Laugh Along with John Williamson (1999)
33. The Way It Is (1999)
34. Australia (1999)
35. Anthems – A Celebration of Australia (August 2000)
36. Gunyah (2002)
37. True Blue Two (2003)
38. Mates on the Road (2004)
39. From Bulldust to Bitumen: 20 Queensland Songs (2005)
40. Chandelier of Stars (2005)
41. We Love this Country (2005)
42. Country Classics 2 (2006)
43. The Platinum Collection (2006)
44. Wildlife Warriors (2006)
45. Hillbilly Road (2008)
46. Absolute Greatest: 40 Years True Blue (2010)
47. John Williamson in Symphony (2011)
48. The Big Red (2012)
49. Hell of a Career (2013)
50. Honest People (2014)
51. His Favourite Collection (2016)
52. Butcherbird (2018)
53. JW Winding Back 1970-2020 (2020)
54. JW Bangers (2022)
55. How Many Songs (2025)

== Extended plays ==
Title	EP details	Chart positions	Certifications (sales thresholds)
Title	EP details	AUS	Certifications (sales thresholds)
Old Man Emu	Released: January 1973; Label: Fable (FBEP-160)	—	
Diggers of the Anzac	Released: 6 April 2015; Label: Tailfeather Music/ Warner	100	
Looking for a Story	Released: 22 April 2016; Label: Tailfeather Music/ Warner	32	

== Singles ==
List of singles as lead artist, with selected chart positions and certifications
Title	Year	Peak chart positions	Certifications	Album
Title	Year	AUS	Certifications	Album
"Old Man Emu"/"Old Gum Tree"	1970	4	ARIA: Gold	John Williamson
"The Unexplored Shadows of Mine"/"Under the Bridge"	1970	—		John Williamson
"Beautiful Sydney"/"Melbourne Blue, Melbourne Green"	1971	—		John Williamson
"Misery Farm"/"Seaside Girls"	1972	—		Old Man Emu (EP)
"Big Country Round"/"Shades of Grey"	1972	—		Old Man Emu (EP)
"W-w-wallaby"/"The Morning After"	1974	—		John Williamson
"Alfred Koala Bear"	1974	—		non-album single
"Comic Strip Cowboy"	1975	—		Comic Strip Cowboy
"It's a Grab It While It's Goin' Kind of Life"	1977	—		Country Greats
"Come Ride a Country Road"	1978	—		Country Greats
"Tearjerkers"	1978	—		Country Greats
"Lonesome Playground"	1978	—		Radio Special
"Murrumbidgee Madness"	1979	—		Road to Town
"The Breaker" (with Charles 'Bud' Tingwell)	1981	100		True Blue – The Best of John Williamson
"Diggers of the ANZAC (This Is Gallipoli)"	1981	—		True Blue – The Best of John Williamson
"True Blue"	1982	—		True Blue – The Best of John Williamson
"(You Gotta Be) Fair Dinkum" (with Karen Johns)	1982	—		Fair Dinkum J.W.
"The Buddies Song (Have a Go)"	1983	—		Buddies soundtrack
"The Vasectomy Song"	1983	28		Singing in the Suburbs
"Lillee and McEnroe"	1984	—		Singing in the Suburbs
"I'm Fair Dinkum"	1984	59		The Smell of Gum Leaves
"Dad's Flowers"	1984	—		The Smell of Gum Leaves
"Go to Nashville"	1985	—		Road Thru the Heart
"You and My Guitar"	1985	—		Road Thru the Heart
"Goodbye Blinky Bill"	1986	—		All the Best
"True Blue" (re-release)	1986	43		Mallee Boy
"Raining on the Rock"	1987	—		Mallee Boy
"Cootamundra Wattle"	1987	—		Mallee Boy
"Crocodile Roll"	1988	—		Boomerang Café
"The Boomerang Café"	1988	—		Boomerang Café
"The March for Australia (A New Beginning)"	1988	—		Boomerang Café
"Station Cook"	1989	—		Warragul
"Rip Rip Woodchip"	1989	39		Warragul
"Boogie with M'Baby"	1989	42		Warragul
"Special Girl"	1989	—		Warragul
"Old Man Emu" (re-release)	1990	155		JW's Family Album
"Christmas Photo"	1990	113		JW's Family Album
"A Flag of Our Own"	1991	119		Waratah Street
"Waratah Street"	1991	142		Waratah Street
"(This Is) Australia Calling"	1992	123		Australia Calling – All the Best Vol 2
"I'll Be Gone"	1992	131		Australia Calling – All the Best Vol 2
"Good Woman"	1993	123		Good Woman
"Seven Year Itch"	1994	181		Mulga to Mangoes
"River Crying Out"	1994	159		Mulga to Mangoes
"Tropical Fever"	1994	160		Mulga to Mangoes
"No One Loves Brisbane Like Jesus"	1995	161		True Blue – The Very Best of John Williamson
"Sir Don"	1996	72		Pipe Dream
"Bush Telegraph"	1997	—		Pipe Dream
"The Golden Kangaroo"	1997	—		Family Album Number 2
"Raining on the Rock" (with Warren H Williams)	1998	—		Country Friends (Warren H Williams album)
"A Thousand Feet" (with Warren H Williams)	1999	—		The Way It Is
"Purple Roses"	1999	—		The Way It Is
"Number on My Back / The Baggy Green"(with Steve Waugh)	1999	95		The Way It Is
"This Ancient Land"(with Jimmy Little)	2000	—		Anthems – A Celebration of Australia
"Waltzing Matilda"	2000	165		Anthems – A Celebration of Australia
"Sing You in the Outback"	2002	176		Gunyah
"Buried in Her Bedclothes"	2002	—		Gunyah
"Raining on the Plains" (with Sara Storer)	2002	—		Beautiful Circle (Sara Storer album)
"Keep Australia Beautiful"	2003	—		True Blue Two
"True Blue" (21st Anniversary)	2003	103		True Blue Two
"A Chandelier of Stars"	2005	—		A Chandelier of Stars
"A Country Balladeer"	2005	—		A Chandelier of Stars
"Flower on the Water"	2005	—		A Chandelier of Stars
"We Love This Country"	2005	—		We Love This Country
"Wildlife Warriors: It's Time"	2006	—		Wildlife Warriors
"And the Band Played Waltzing Matilda" (live)	2008	146		The Platinum Collection
"Drink a Little Love"	2008	—		Hillbilly Road
"Cydi"	2008	—		Hillbilly Road
"Hillbilly Road"	2008	—		Hillbilly Road
"Australia Is Another Word for Free"(with Warren H. Williams)	2009	—		Hillbilly Road
"Better Than a Picture"	2009	—		Hillbilly Road
"King of the Road"(with Adam Harvey)	2009	—		Both Sides Now
"Island of Oceans"(with Shannon Noll)	2010	—		Absolute Greatest: 40 Years True Blue
"Hang My Hat in Queensland"	2011	—		The Big Red
"The Big Red"	2012	—		The Big Red
"Prairie Hotel Parachilna"	2013	—		The Big Red
"Grandpa's Cricket"	2014	—		Honest People
"Honest People"	2014	—		Honest People
"Clouds Over Tamworth"	2014	—		Honest People
"Looking for a Story"	2016	—		Looking for a Story
"Aussie Girls!"	2016	—		His Favourite Collection
"Pigs on the River"	2017	—		Butcherbird
"Love Is the Word"	2017	—		non-album single
"The Valley of His Dreams"	2018	—		Butcherbird
"Flowers of Jacaranda"	2019	—		
"Three Sons"(with Aleyce Simmonds)	2019	—		
"Those Fifty Years"	2020	—		JW Winding Back 1970-2020
"The Great Divide"	2020	—		
"Come Back To Me, Country"	2021	—		
"It's Raining Again"	2022	—		
"Waiting for the Sun" (with Ami Williamson)	2022	—		
"The Voice of the Sea"	2022	—		
"Voice from the Heart"	2023	—		non album singles
"Uluru Forever"	2023	—		non album singles

== Video albums ==
Title	Details	Certification
John Williamson Live	Released: 1988; Label: Festival Records	
Welcome to the Campfire	Released: 1989; Label: Festival Records	
Waratah Street Live	Released: 1991; Label: Festival Records	
Australia Calling	Released: 1992; Label: Gum Leaf Recordings	
Mulga to Mangoes – Live At The Woolshed	Released: 1994; Label:	
True Blue - The Videos	Released: 1995; Label:	
For Aussie Kids	Released: 1998; Label:	
The Way It Is	Released: 1999; Label:	
The Way It Is	Released: 1999; Label:	
Anthems: A Celebration of Australia	Released: 2000; Label:	
Gunyah – I'll Sing You the Outback	Released: 2002; Label:	
True Blue Two - The VHS Collection	Released: 2003; Label:	
Mates On the Road	Released: 2004; Label:	
Chandelier of Stars	Released: 2006; Label:	
Hillbilly Road	Released: 2009; Label:	
Absolute Greatest: 40 Years True Blue	Released: 2010; Label:	
John Williamson in Symphony	Released: 2011; Label: Warner	ARIA: Platinum
Songs from the Outback	Released: 2016; Label:	

== Music videos ==
Year	Video
1989	"Rip Rip Woodchip"
1989	"Boogie with M'Baby"
1992	"I'll Be Gone"
1992	"Australia Calling"
1994	"River Crying Out"
1994	"Tropical Fever"
1998	"Raining On The Rock"
1999	"A Thousand Feet"
2003	"True Blue"
2005	"Chandelier Of Stars"
2005	"Little Girl From The Dryland"
2009	"Australia Is Another Word For Free"
2009	"Better Than A Picture"
2009	"King Of The Road"
2011	"Hang My Hat In Queensland"
2012	"The Big Red"
2013	"Prairie Hotel Parachilna"
2014	"Honest People"
