= The Way It Goes (disambiguation) =

"The Way It Goes" is a 1999 song by Status Quo.

The Way It Goes may also refer to:

- The Way It Goes, an EP by Gloriana, or the title song
- "The Way It Goes", a song by the Wild Strawberries on the album Bet You Think I'm Lonely
- "The Way It Goes", a 2007 song by Blood Red Shoes on 2008 album Box of Secrets
- "The Way It Goes", a song by Gillian Welch from 2011 album The Harrow & the Harvest
- "The Way It Goes", a song by Jarren Benton from 2013 album My Grandma's Basement

== See also ==
- "Way It Go", a 2015 song by DJ Switch, produced by Nasty C
- That's the Way It Goes (disambiguation)
- This Is the Way It Goes and Goes and Goes, a 1999 album by Juno
- The Way It Is (disambiguation)
- That's the Way It Is (disambiguation)
- "That's Just the Way It Is", a song by Phil Collins and David Crosby
