= Live Flames =

Live album by Snowy White & the White Flames
- Released: 8 October 2007
- Recorded: December 2006 (England)
- Genre: Blues rock
- Length: 1:10:23
- Label: White Flames Records
- Producer: Snowy White & the White Flames

Snowy White & the White Flames chronology
The Way It Is...Live! (2005)	Live Flames (2007)

White Flames is the first live album by English blues guitarist Snowy White and his band, The White Flames. It contains 12 songs, recorded on the 2006 White Flames UK tour.

== Track listing ==
All tracks are written by Snowy White, except where noted.

No.	Title	Writer(s)	Original Album	Length
1.	"I'll Be Moving On"		Little Wing	6:16
2.	"That Ain't Right"		Little Wing	7:16
3.	"What I'm Searching For"		The Way It Is	7:01
4.	"Land of Plenty"		Birds of Paradise – An Anthology	6:32
5.	"Time Waits For No Man"		Keep Out – We Are Toxic	3:24
6.	"A Miracle I Need"		No Faith Required	8:18
7.	"Wintersong"	Max Middleton, Snowy White		4:19
8.	"The Emmerpeirissa Express"	Walter Latupeirissa, Juan van Emmerloot		3:05
9.	"Whiteflames Blues"	Latupeirissa, Middleton, van Emmerloot, White	Realistic	5:10
10.	"American Dream"		No Faith Required	9:08
11.	"Long Grey Mare"	Peter Green	Fleetwood Mac	4:03
12.	"That's When I'll Stop Loving You"		Little Wing	5:51
Total length:				1:10:23

== Personnel ==
- Snowy White – vocals, guitars
- Walter Latupeirissa – bass guitar
- Max Middleton – keyboards
- Juan van Emmerloot – drums, percussion
