= Snowy White (album) =

Studio album by Snowy White
- Released: 1984
- Recorded: February – August 1984
- Studio: Angel, CBS, Livingston, Maison Rouge, Red Bus, Roundhouse, Sarm East and West Studios
- Genre: Blues rock
- Length: 56:04 (CD)
- Label: Towerbell, Repertoire (CD)
- Producer: Kuma Harada

Snowy White chronology
White Flames (1983)	Snowy White (1984)	That Certain Thing (1987)

Alternative cover
- 1984 French release, as Land of Freedom

Snowy White is the second album by blues guitarist Snowy White, released in 1984.

The album was issued as Land of Freedom in some territories, featuring a different photograph on the album cover and White's UK No. 6 hit single "Bird of Paradise" appended as a ninth track. It was reissued on CD in 1997 with two bonus tracks: "Muddy Fingers", a non-album B-side, and "Someone Else", an outtake from the album sessions.

Professional ratings
Review scores
Source	Rating
AllMusic	2.5/5 stars

== Track listing ==
All tracks are written by Snowy White, except where noted.

No.	Title	Writer(s)	Length
1.	"Land of Freedom"		6:00
2.	"Long Summer Days"		6:10
3.	"Chinese Burn"		5:25
4.	"Peace on Earth"		5:38
5.	"The Water's Edge/Stepping Stones"	White, Kuma Harada, Richard Bailey, Tony Moronie, Winston Delandro	5:42
6.	"So Breathless"	White, Harada	4:00
7.	"Fortune"		5:53
8.	"When I Arise"	White, Harada, Niels Jannette-Walen	8:53

CD bonus tracks
No.	Title	Length
9.	"Someone Else"	5:14
10.	"Muddy Fingers"	3:10

== Personnel ==
=== Musicians ===
- Snowy White – guitars, vocals
- Winston Delandro – guitar
- Kuma Harada – bass guitar
- Godfrey Wang – keyboards
- Niels Jannette-Walen – English horn, oboe d'amour, lyricon, string arrangements
- Richard Bailey – drums, percussion
- Linda Taylor – backing vocals
- Tessa Niles – backing vocals

=== Technical ===
- Kuma Harada – producer
- Snowy White, Martin Adam – co-producers
- Martin Adam – engineer
- Mark Stent – assistant engineer
- Dennis Blackham – mastering at Tape One, London
- Lawrence Lawry – photography
- The Advertising Business Ltd. – sleeve design

== Charts ==
Chart (1985)	Peak position
UK Albums (OCC)	88
