= Well Kept Secret =

Well Kept Secret may refer to:

- Well Kept Secret (John Martyn album)
- Well Kept Secret (Juice Newton album)
