= Pixie Jenkins =

- Pixie Jenkins, photographed by Paul Wiles CAAMA

Background information
- Born: Paul Blake Jenkins; 21 March 1957 (age 69); Launceston, Tasmania, Australia
- Genre: Country
- Occupations: Fiddle player, singer, songwriter, entertainer
- Instruments: Violin, vocals
- Years active: 1977-present
- Website: pixiejenkins.com

Pixie Jenkins (born Paul Blake Jenkins; 21 March 1957) is an Australian fiddle player, singer, songwriter, and entertainer.

Referred to by his stage name 'Pixie', in an article in The Australian in 2017, Pixie was referenced alongside Jimmy Little, Chad Morgan and Slim Dusty as "...an icon of Australia's country music industry".

== Career ==
Pixie Jenkins' first studio recording was on the Rick and Thel Carey recording Doing Things Together released by Hadley Records in 1977. In 1979, he was asked to join Buddy Williams' travelling roadshow. In 1981 Pixie joined Are You Ready for the Country, a show produced by Lester V Coombs. He joined rock 'n' roll star Digger Revell in his country show supporting Cher and Charley Pride in 1983.

In 1984, Pixie left Sydney and joined The Hired Hands in Tamworth and the band went on to win the 1984 Australian country music awards 'Golden Guitar' for Best Instrumental.

In 1985, Pixie joined Bullamakanka, and with the group, was awarded two further 'Golden Guitars'.

In 1989, Jenkins collaborated for the first time with John Williamson, becoming a regular musician on Williamson's live tours and albums.

In 1993, Jenkins imprinted his hands into Tamworth's Country Music Hands of Fame.

In 1993 and 1994 Jenkins won two solo Golden Guitars awards.

In 1997, Tamworth Council appointed Jenkins as an Ambassador for Country Music. He was also elected to the Country Music Association of Australia board of management.

In 2000, he took up his first theatrical role as Fiddler in a production of Fiddler on the Roof at the Gold Coast Entertainment Centre, to much critical acclaim. In 2001, he took the lead role in Oklahoma!, performed again at the Gold Coast Entertainment Centre, and reprised in 2002 at the Hills Entertainment Centre in Sydney.

In 2002, he won Best Instrumental Award at the Victorian Country Music Awards, for his performance on the John Williamson track 'Cootamundra Wattle'. In October 2003, he embarked on the 'Mates on the Road Reunion Tour', an 18-month international tour, alongside John Williamson and Warren H Williams, including dates in Australia, New Zealand, North America and the United Kingdom.

In 2009, he received the Lifetime Achievement Award at the Golden Fiddle Awards.

Pixie Jenkins and Ryan Sampson together, are a popular duo called Campfire.

Pixie is also a weekend breakfast presenter on 88.9 FM Tamworth.

== Discography ==
=== Albums ===
Title	Details
Larger Than Life	Released: 1992; Label: EMI Music (8140252)
Pixieland	Released: 1993; Label: EMI Music (8280292)

== Awards ==
=== Country Music Awards of Australia ===
The Country Music Awards of Australia (CMAA) (also known as the Golden Guitar Awards) is an annual awards night held in January during the Tamworth Country Music Festival, celebrating recording excellence in the Australian country music industry. They have been held annually since 1973.

Year	Nominee / work	Award	Result
1993	himself	Hands of Fame	imprinted
1993	"Kanga"	Instrumental of the Year	Won
1994	"Kindee"	Instrumental of the Year	Won

=== Australian Celtic Music Awards ===
Year	Nominee / work	Award	Result
2019	Himself	Male Artist of the Year	Won
