= Jeff Allen (musician) =

- Born: Jeffrey Allen; 23 April 1946 (age 80); Matlock, Derbyshire, England
- Genres: Rock; Blues
- Occupation: Drummer
- Instrument: Drums
- Years active: 1971–present
- Formerly of: The Beatstalkers, East of Eden, Snowy White's Blues Agency

Jeffrey Allen (born 23 April 1946) is an English rock and blues session drummer. Allen is best known for his work with East of Eden, Snowy White, Bonnie Tyler, Mick Taylor and Van Morrison.

He is not to be confused, although in many listings often is, with the similarly named former drummer with the British glam rock outfit, Hello, whose brother is Ultravox's Chris Cross.

== Biography ==
Allen became the drummer with the Glasgow based band, The Beatstalkers, who played residencies at the Marquee Club in London, and the Frankfurt and Cologne 'Storeyville' clubs. Allen joined East of Eden in 1971, and his percussion work appeared on five of their albums in the 1970s. In the early 1980s, working as a freelance session musician, Allen played on albums recorded by Bonnie Tyler (Goodbye to the Island), Murray Head (Voices) and John Martyn (Well Kept Secret). In 1986, Allen joined Snowy White's Blues Agency, and drummed on their 1988 album, Change My Life.

In 1995, Allen teamed up with both Mick Taylor and Snowy White for their live album, Arthur's Club-Geneve 1995. In 2003, Allen played drums on Baghdad by Ilham al-Madfai. He also played backing Mick Taylor and Max Middleton at London's Cadogan Hall in 2012.

Most recent duties include party planning for the Brunei Royal Family in London, which led to his appointment as executive producer of music concerts for Sensible Music, London..

== Partial discography ==
- 1971: New Leaf - East of Eden
- 1971: World of East of Eden - East of Eden
- 1972: First Base - Babe Ruth (played on one track)
- 1975: Another Eden - East of Eden
- 1976: It's the Climate - East of Eden
- 1978: Restless - Rab Noakes
- 1978: Silver Park - East of Eden
- 1981: Goodbye to the Island - Bonnie Tyler
- 1981: Voices - Murray Head
- 1982: Well Kept Secret - John Martyn
- 1983: Philentropy - John Martyn
- 1988: Change My Life - Snowy White's Blues Agency
- 1995: Arthur's Club-Geneve 1995 - Mick Taylor & Snowy White (live album)
- 2000: Burning Bush - Troy Hardin
- 2000: Peter Green Songbook - Peter Green
- 2000: A Stone's Throw - Mick Taylor
- 2003: Baghdad - Ilham al-Madfai
- 2005: Ghost Party - Jeff Arundel
- 2007: Utopia 2 - Belinda
- 2009: Twice as Addictive - Snowy White's Blues Agency

Through his drumming duties with various musicians over the years, Allen's work appears on numerous compilation albums.
