= Renegade (Thin Lizzy album) =

Studio album by Thin Lizzy
- Released: 16 November 1981
- Recorded: January–September 1981
- Studios: Compass Point, Nassau; Odyssey, London; Morgan, London
- Genre: Hard rock
- Length: 40:51
- Labels: Vertigo; Mercury (Canada); Warner Bros. (US)
- Producers: Thin Lizzy, Chris Tsangarides

Thin Lizzy chronology
Chinatown (1980)	Renegade (1981)	Thunder and Lightning (1983)

Singles from Renegade
- 1. "Hollywood (Down on Your Luck)" Released: February 1982

Renegade is the eleventh studio album by Irish rock band Thin Lizzy, released on 16th November 1981. Though not his first appearance, this was the first album in which keyboard player Darren Wharton was credited as a permanent member, becoming the fifth member of the line-up. As such, he made a contribution as a songwriter on the opening track "Angel of Death". However, even though he had officially joined the band, his picture was omitted from the album sleeve. Renegade was the second and final album to feature guitarist Snowy White. By his own admission, White was more suited to playing blues than heavy rock and he quit by mutual agreement the following year. He went on to have a hit single with "Bird of Paradise" in 1983.

A remastered and expanded edition of Renegade was released on 23 September 2013 and includes five bonus tracks.

== Recording ==
The previous album Chinatown having been released in October 1980, Thin Lizzy travelled to Compass Point Studios, Nassau, in early January 1981 to start work on the follow-up. Chinatown co-producer Kit Woolven accompanied them, and they worked on four songs during the following week. However, band leader and main songwriter Phil Lynott was also using this studio time to record material for his second solo album, and two of these songs, "Cathleen" and "A Little Bit of Water", appeared on The Philip Lynott Album the following year. "In the Delta" ultimately remained unused, but "It's Getting Dangerous for Us" became the first song earmarked for the as yet untitled Thin Lizzy album.

The band then went on the road, before convening at Townhouse Studios in London in March to work on more new material. Work continued on "In the Delta", and a song left over from the Chinatown sessions, "The Act", was reworked and abandoned again, while another song destined to be a Lynott solo track, "Someone Else's Dream", was recorded. Three other songs were brought in: the upbeat "Kill (Gotta Get a Gun)"; guitarist Scott Gorham's song "Wham Bam", and a song begun by Snowy White called "Fats". The latter was the only track which emerged on Renegade.

In early May, Thin Lizzy began work at the new Odyssey Studios in London, as they were increasingly unable to secure time at Good Earth Studios. More time was spent on "The Act", while Lynott recorded an eight-minute demo of a tune called "Mexican Girl". Another song recorded at this time which was eventually left unused was "For Always" (originally titled "Darren's Tune"), which originated with keyboard player Darren Wharton, and featured a string arrangement by Fiachra Trench. Later in May and June, two songs featuring White on lead vocals, "Only Woman" and "Moving Away From Here", were recorded but unfinished. Two further songs were started which did find their way on to Renegade – "Banging My Head Against the Wall" and "I'm Gonna Leave This Town". The former was rewritten as "Down on Your Luck" in July, before receiving its final title of "Hollywood (Down on Your Luck)". "Kill (Gotta Get a Gun)" was developed, as was "Mexican Girl" (now retitled "Mexican Blood").

=== "Trouble Boys" ===
Also in July, the band recorded two covers: "Trouble Boys", written by Billy Bremner of Rockpile (who was present in the studio at the time), and Percy Mayfield's "Memory Pain", suggested by White and featuring his bluesy lead guitar. Lynott wanted to release the former as a single, against the wishes of the rest of the band, and convinced the band's record company to do so. White later said, "Nobody wanted to put that out except Phil. Scott was dead against putting it out." Wharton remembered, "Everyone hated the damn song," while British music newspaper Record Mirror described it as "dinosaur stuff". The title of the forthcoming album was pencilled in to be Trouble Boys to link to the single, but when it stalled at number 53 in the UK charts, the title and the two covers were dropped.

Between touring and festival dates, Thin Lizzy also began work on "Disaster", co-written by Lynott and Wharton. This song, along with "Hollywood (Down on Your Luck)", was performed live for the first time in Germany in late August. Also around this time, Lynott and drummer Brian Downey reunited with the band's original guitarist Eric Bell, who had left in 1973, to record "Song for Jimmy", Lynott's tribute to Jimi Hendrix. This was never considered for the Renegade album, although possibly as a Lynott solo track, but it ultimately appeared on a flexi disc given away with Flexipop magazine in the UK in August. It was later released on the Vagabonds Kings Warriors Angels box set in 2001, with the title corrected to "Song for Jimi".

=== Change of co-producer ===
The band continued working at Odyssey Studios and Morgan Studios, recording overdubs and developing more material during September. At this point Lynott and co-producer Kit Woolven had a disagreement about sharing studio time between Thin Lizzy and Lynott's solo project. Woolven had become frustrated: "I wanted to try and make sure that the solo album sounded one way and the Lizzy stuff sounded another way. If you're flipping between things all the time, it's quite confusing." He also said he was not keen on the Renegade material: "It didn't do it for me. I stuck with the solo stuff as it was more interesting." Downey added, "There was definitely confusion, absolutely. There was a definite crossover where you didn't know which album the songs were going to appear on... Kit questioned the whole procedure, and I had to agree with him."

Young producer Chris Tsangarides was working at Morgan Studios at the time, and he met with the band and reviewed their progress, agreeing to help them finish the album. He expressed concern at the lack of focus within the material, and urged the band to write some new songs. As well as the two covers from the failed single, other songs were dropped. These consisted of songs considered best suited to Lynott's solo project, such as "Beat of the Drum" and "Someone Else's Dream", and unfinished material like "Bad Is Bad", "Only Woman" and "Moving Away From Here". Also abandoned were "For Always" and the "Trouble Boys" soundalike "Kill (Gotta Get a Gun)". New songs brought in included the revamped "Disaster", now titled "Angel of Death", which was also considered as an album title. Gorham expressed his dislike of the title, and the song: "I thought "Angel of Death" was too heavy metal for words, and I hated it." He later clarified, "For a time there, it wasn't one of our favourites... [but] that song, more than any other song convinced me that [Wharton] had a right to be in Thin Lizzy."

Also recorded at this stage were "The Pressure Will Blow" and "No-One Told Him", as well as a reworking of an idea of White's from earlier in the year with the title "If You Save Souls". On leaving the studio for a break, Lynott saw a biker with the Thin Lizzy and Motörhead logos on his jacket. Also on the man's jacket was the word "Renegade", which inspired Lynott to rewrite "If You Save Souls" as "Renegade", giving him the idea for the album title at the same time. Lynott was also inspired by reading "The Rebel" by Albert Camus. "It sort of came in a blinding flash: the idea of there being a rebel in us all," he said.

=== Completion ===
"Angel of Death" opened the album and represented Wharton's first co-writing credit with the band. Lynott's lyrics were inspired by seeing The Man Who Saw Tomorrow, about the predictions of Nostradamus. The title track "Renegade" follows, co-written by White with most of the lead guitar played by him. Tsangarides remembered: "That was mostly all Snowy on "Renegade". The whole style of the song was really him." He added that this was the song which needed most work at the time he took over the co-producer role. White has named it as his favourite Thin Lizzy song. Next was "The Pressure Will Blow", co-written with Gorham, which Lynott explained was about a man who discovered his partner's affair, and who told her to leave before he became violent. "So it's controlled anger," he said. The last song on side one, "Leave This Town", was influenced by ZZ Top. On hearing Gorham play the riff, Lynott later said, "Immediately I sort of ripped off ZZ Top for all their worth."

Side two opened with "Hollywood (Down on Your Luck)", which was released as the only single from the album in March 1982, after the album was released. It reached number 53, the same position as "Trouble Boys" a few months earlier. Tsangarides said they all struggled to find a single to release from the album, "but I think we felt that "Hollywood" was the closest." It is followed by "No-One Told Him", one of only two songs written solely by Lynott. Some members of the band expressed reservations about the Lynott/White collaboration "Fats", about Fats Waller and somewhat in Waller's style. Gorham said, "I remember "Fats" going down on tape and thinking, 'Whoa, what was that?'" Wharton added, "Despite the fact I got to do a piano solo, I thought "Fats" missed the mark. So did "Mexican Blood" and one or two others." Downey, however, liked the Western-themed "Mexican Blood": "I play some timbales as well as marimbas on "Mexican Blood". Good song, I like that one." The album closes with "It's Getting Dangerous", one of the first ideas Lynott brought to the sessions at Compass Point in January, with a lyric describing friends drifting apart. Tsangarides stated, "It's one of my favourite tracks that I still listen to, to this day."

== Cover ==
Regular Thin Lizzy artist Jim Fitzpatrick was initially engaged in designing the album cover, and drew an apocalyptic scene as a preliminary idea while the album title was pencilled in as Angel of Death. Once the title was established as Renegade, Fitzpatrick drew rough drafts of a cover featuring Lynott on a wanted poster reminiscent of the Wild West, which Lynott liked. However, Phonogram / Vertigo were unwilling to provide funding for an outside artist, and the final cover was photographed by Graham Hughes, a cousin of Roger Daltrey. One idea was to show the band superimposed on a dark mountain with a red sky in the background, but the final version showed an arm waving a deep red flag with a yellow five-pointed star on it. On release, Lynott said the flag had nothing to do with communism, "It's not supposed to be a communist flag," he said, "although it looks like one... nothing to do with North Vietnam or anything." The red colour was inspired by Lynott seeing the colour of a box of Dunhill cigarettes belonging to co-producer Tsangarides, although Lynott claimed at the time they were his own.

The back cover featured Hughes' portraits of four of the band members, with Wharton omitted. The record company said the layout of the back cover dictated that there was only room for four photos, which angered Wharton: "It was a horrible excuse and it hurt me a great deal," he said. Another suggestion was that the record company were unaware that Wharton was by this time a full member of the band. Lynott was keen at the time to quash any suggestion of the group breaking up.

== Reception ==
Professional ratings
Review scores
Source	Rating
AllMusic	2/5 stars
Collector's Guide to Heavy Metal	10/10
Rolling Stone	2/5 stars

Greg Prato of AllMusic claimed that Renegade is Thin Lizzy's worst album, with "blatant pop leanings and a production too similar to British heavy metal bands of the early '80s", blaming Snowy White's incompatibility with the group, Lynott's "flat vocals" and the band's drug problems. Prato named "The Pressure Will Blow", "Leave This Town" and "Hollywood (Down on Your Luck)" as the album's better songs. David Fricke in his review for Rolling Stone stated his disappointment for Lynott's performance as singer and songwriter on the album, writing that "only the rousing chorus of "Hollywood (Down on Your Luck)" and the poignant sense of loss in "It's Getting Dangerous" hint at the sensitive yet anthemic writing and hard-rock smarts that usually separate Thin Lizzy from the lunkheads". On the contrary, Canadian journalist Martin Popoff praised the album for its superb production and the professional state-of-the-art sound, calling Renegade "an absolute masterpiece of deeply soulful and richly textured hard rock", whose "fullness and maturity tend to emerge only when played repeatedly".

Renegade has been ranked the eighth best Thin Lizzy album by Mojo and Ultimate Classic Rock. Paul Elliott of Mojo deems it an "overlooked album", drawing attention to Wharton's keyboard work and the lighter-edged material such as the swinging "Fats" and cinematic "Mexican Blood", while Ultimate Classic Rock's Eduardo Rivadiva deems it arguably the band's most underrated album, praising its eclecticism and "meticulous songcraft". Rivadavia notes the metallic, jazzy and Latin-style elements of "Angel of Death", "Fats" and "Mexican Blood", respectively. Conversely, Classic Rock consider it Thin Lizzy's worst album, naming it "a dicey collection of downer-rock tunes heavy on Darren Wharton's prog rock keyboards, and a surprisingly apocalyptic world view from the normally optimistic Lynott." However, they believe the record "retains a desperate, grubby charm."

Co-producer Chris Tsangarides said later, "When I hear the Renegade album now, I get it... I think it was maybe ahead of its time. It was just too diverse for people to accept when it was first released. If you listen to it you'll notice that no one song on there is like another."

== Track listing ==
Side one
No.	Title	Writer(s)	Length
1.	"Angel of Death"	Phil Lynott, Darren Wharton	6:18
2.	"Renegade"	Lynott, Snowy White	6:08
3.	"The Pressure Will Blow"	Scott Gorham, Lynott	3:46
4.	"Leave This Town"	Gorham, Lynott	3:49

Side two
No.	Title	Writer(s)	Length
5.	"Hollywood (Down on Your Luck)"	Gorham, Lynott	4:09
6.	"No One Told Him"	Lynott	3:36
7.	"Fats"	Lynott, White	4:02
8.	"Mexican Blood"	Lynott	3:40
9.	"It's Getting Dangerous"	Gorham, Lynott	5:30

2013 remastered bonus tracks
No.	Title	Writer(s)	Length
10.	"Trouble Boys"	Billy Bremner	3:32
11.	"Memory Pain"	Percy Mayfield	4:44
12.	"Hollywood (Down on Your Luck)" (Extended version)	Gorham, Lynott	6:16
13.	"Renegade" (Edited version)	Lynott, White	5:25
14.	"Hollywood (Down on Your Luck)" (7" A Promo)	Gorham, Lynott	3:18

== Singles ==
- "Trouble Boys" / "Memory Pain" – 31 July 1981
- "Hollywood" / "The Pressure Will Blow"

A picture disc single was also released.
In the Netherlands, the B-side was "Mexican Blood". In Canada, the B-side was the Phil Lynott solo track, "Girls".

== Personnel ==
=== Thin Lizzy ===
- Phil Lynott – bass guitar, lead vocals
- Scott Gorham – guitars, backing vocals
- Snowy White – guitars, backing vocals
- Darren Wharton – keyboards, organ, Minimoog, backing vocals
- Brian Downey – drums, percussion

=== Production ===
- Chris Tsangarides – producer, engineer
- Kit Woolven, Andrew Warwick – engineers
- Ian Cooper – mastering at Townhouse Studios, London

== Charts ==
Chart (1981–82)	Peak position
Canada Top Albums/CDs (RPM)	35
Finnish Albums (The Official Finnish Charts)	28
Swedish Albums (Sverigetopplistan)	24
UK Albums (Official Charts)	38
US Billboard 200	157
