= Glorious Fool =

Studio album by John Martyn
- Released: September 1981
- Studio: Townhouse, London
- Genre: Folk, blues, jazz fusion
- Length: 55:16
- Label: WEA
- Producer: Phil Collins

John Martyn chronology
Grace and Danger (1980)	Glorious Fool (1981)	Well Kept Secret (1982)

Professional ratings
Review scores
Source	Rating
AllMusic	4/5 stars
The Encyclopedia of Popular Music	4/5 stars
Melody Maker	(favourable)
NME	(mixed)
Record Mirror	5/5 stars

Glorious Fool is the ninth studio album by musician John Martyn. After a long association with Island Records, this was Martyn's first of two albums for WEA. The album was produced by Phil Collins and engineered by Nick Launay and Steve Travell. The album is named for the title track satirising Ronald Reagan's ascent to the White House as the 40th U.S. President.

The opening track "Couldn't Love You More" is a re-worked arrangement of the song that originally appeared on his seventh album, 1977's One World. The original acoustic version is here re-recorded as a full-band track, featuring a guest appearance from Eric Clapton. Clapton covered Martyn's "May You Never" on his 1977 album Slowhand. When Martyn was presented with a lifetime achievement award by Collins at the 2008 BBC Folk Awards, Clapton sent a message saying that he was "so far ahead of everything else it was inconceivable". "Couldn't Love You More", in its various forms, remained a fixture of Martyn's live performances. Irish Musician Lisa Hannigan has described the song as one of her favourites, covering the song with Faultline in 2006.

In August 1981, "Please Fall In Love With Me"/"Don't You Go" was released as a single.

More mainstream in production compared to Martyn's previous albums, and helped by promotion in the way of a 32-date UK tour, Glorious Fool charted at #25 on its release.

== Track listing ==
All tracks composed by John Martyn.

Side one

1. "Couldn't Love You More" – 3:59
2. "Amsterdam" – 5:27
3. "Hold On My Heart" – 4:39
4. "Perfect Hustler"– 4:42
5. "Hearts and Keys" – 7:33

Side two

1. "Glorious Fool" – 4:58
2. "Never Say Never" – 4:56
3. "Pascanel (Get Back Home)" – 3:48
4. "Didn't Do That" – 4:20
5. "Please Fall in Love With Me" – 6:07
6. "Don't You Go" – 4:43

== Personnel ==
- John Martyn – vocals, guitar
- Max Middleton – keyboards
- Eric Clapton – guitar on "Couldn't Love You More"
- Alan Thomson – bass
- Phil Collins – drums (all tracks except "Don't You Go"), vocoder, additional vocals, acoustic piano on "Don't You Go"
- Danny Cummings – percussion
- Dick Cuthell – flugelhorn on "Hold on My Heart", trumpet on "Didn't Do That"

Production

- Phil Collins – producer
- Nick Launay – engineer
- Steve Travell – assistant engineer
- Bill Smith – cover design
- Eberhard Grames – front cover photo
- Andrew Douglas – back cover photo
