= The Apprentice (album) =

Studio album by John Martyn
- Released: 1990
- Genre: Rock
- Length: 46:37 (original cd release)
- Label: Permanent Records
- Producer: Brian Young, John Martyn

John Martyn chronology
| Piece by Piece (1986) | The Apprentice (1990) | Cooltide (1991) |

Professional ratings
Review scores
| Source | Rating |
|---|---|
| AllMusic | 3/5 stars |
| John Martyn's Website | (not rated) |
| Encyclopedia of Popular Music | 4/5 stars |

The Apprentice is a rock album by John Martyn. Recorded at CaVa Studios, Glasgow, Scotland. Originally released on CD by Permanent Records, catalogue number PERM CD 1.

The demo recordings for The Apprentice were the trigger for Martyn's being dropped by Island Records in 1988. Despite this, when the album (recorded in its final form at Martyn's own expense) appeared in 1990, it was well reviewed and regarded as something of a return to form by Martyn enthusiasts.

In 2013, the original Island mix of the album was issued on the Island Years box-set featuring 16 tracks.

== Track listing ==
All tracks composed by John Martyn except where indicated.

1. "Live On Love" – 4:05
2. "The River" – 4:01
3. "Look At The Girl" – 4:28
4. "Income Town" – 4:23
5. "Send Me One Line" – 5:31
6. "Deny this Love" – 4:07
7. "Hold Me" – 4:47
8. "Upo" – 3:43
9. "The Apprentice" – 4:10
10. "The Moment"^{1} – 3:40
11. "Patterns In The Rain" (Foster Patterson) – 3:42

^{1}Not included in LP release

Additional tracks included on 2007 remastered release via One World

12. "Deny This Love" (remix) – 3:53
13. "The Apprentice" (live) – 4:50
14. "The River" (live) – 4:49
15. "Send Me One Line" (live) – 5:47
16. "Look At The Girl" (live) – 5:29

== Personnel ==
(as listed on original CD release)

- John Martyn – vocals, guitars
- Foster Patterson – keyboards
- Taj Wyzgowski – rhythm guitar (1, 9)
- Dave Ball – bass (1, 2)
- Arran Ahmun – drums
- Danny Cummings – percussion, backing vocals
- Colin Tully – saxophone (2, 8)
- Andy Shepherd – saxophone (3, 5, 6)
- Danusia Cummings – backing vocals

Live tracks

- John Martyn – vocals, guitars
- Spencer Cozens – keyboards
- Alan Thomson – bass
- Arran Ahmun – drums
- Dave Lewis – saxophone

== Production ==
- John Martyn – producer, mixing
- Brian Young – producer, mixing, engineer
- Gavin McComb – assistant engineer
- Andy Larwood – art design
- Ken Sharp – photography
- John Leonard – management
- Lisa Sharpe – management

2007 Reissue credits

- Dallas Simpson – remastering at Dallas Masters (UK)
- Jon Price – booklet design, layout
- Bob Edge – photography
- John Hillarby – liner notes
