= Ryan Sampson (singer) =

- Born: Tamworth, New South Wales Australia
- Genre: Country
- Website: ryansampson.com

Ryan Sampson is an Australian Entertainer, model, singer/songwriter and radio personality, from Tamworth, New South Wales.

== Music career ==
Sampson's early musical journey began when he was named 2006 Overall Queensland Champion of Champions. From there Ryan’s successes have included; Camerata, Junior College, CMAA College of Country Music and two time Toyota Star Maker - Grand Finalist (2006 & 2012).

== Australian Idol ==
Ryan appeared on Australian Idol 2009, he was the only contestant to make it through as an automatic entry in the top 60, completing his Australian Idol journey in the top 40.

At the time of the audition Sampson was 21 years old. He sang Garth Brooks' The Storm. Dicko also said he was not "classically attractive".

== Campfire Duo ==
Ryan Sampson and Pixie Jenkins joined together in 2014 to make a duo called Campfire. The popular duo have regular performances at the Tamworth Country Music Festival each year, often with special guests like Warren H Williams and Manfred Vijars.

== Personal life ==
In the mid 2000s, Ryan Moved to Toowoomba, Queensland later being a cars salesman selling Mercedes-Benz cars. In 2015 Sampson got the opportunity to move back to his hometown of Tamworth, New South Wales to work his long-term goal with radio 88.9 FM. Ryan hosted the 'Workplace Request Show' then later 'The Ryan Sampson Show' but the show was put on hold when he had to have an operation, to remove polyps from his vocal cords. Ryan is the co-founder and an announcer on Howdy FM a new country music station from Tamworth.
