= Piece by Piece (John Martyn album) =

Piece By Piece

Studio album by John Martyn
- Released: February 1986
- Recorded: Cava Sound Workshops, Glasgow, Scotland
- Genre: Rock
- Length: 40:31
- Label: Island
- Producer: John Martyn

John Martyn chronology
| Sapphire (1984) | Piece By Piece (1986) | The Apprentice (1990) |

Piece by Piece is a rock album by John Martyn. Recorded at CaVa Sound Workshops, Glasgow, Scotland. Originally released on LP by Island, catalogue number ILPS 9807, with cover photography by Mike Owen.

The album was rated 2.5 out of 5 stars by AllMusic.

== Track listing ==
All tracks composed by John Martyn except where indicated.

1. "Nightline" - 5:04
2. "Lonely Love" - 3:22
3. "Angeline" - 4:45
4. "One Step Too Far" - 3:18
5. "Piece By Piece" (Foster Paterson) - 3:56
6. "Serendipity" - 4:08
7. "Who Believes In Angels" - 4:36
8. "Love Of Mine" - 4:47
9. "John Wayne" - 6:55

== Personnel ==
- John Martyn – vocals, guitars, guitar synthesizers
- Foster Patterson – keyboards, backing vocals
- Alan Thomson – fretless bass
- Danny Cummings – percussion
- Colin Tully – saxophone

=== Production ===
- Steve Parker – A&R
- John Martyn – producer
- Brian Young – engineer, mixing
- Robin Rankin – engineer, mixing
- Mike Owen – photography
- Island Art – cover design
