= Angel of Death (Thin Lizzy song) =

1982 single by Thin Lizzy

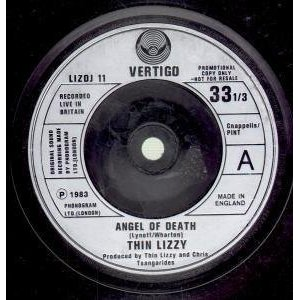

Single by Thin Lizzy

from the album Renegade
- Released: 1982
- Genre: Hard rock, heavy metal
- Length: 6:18
- Label: Warner Bros. Records (USA)
- Songwriter(s): Phil Lynott, Darren Wharton

"Angel of Death" is a song by rock band Thin Lizzy featured on their Renegade album, released as a single in the United States. The tune peaked at No. 38 on the Mainstream Rock chart. The song was a collaboration between band leader Phil Lynott and Darren Wharton, who had joined the band as a keyboard player in 1980. Angel of Death was premiered live in August 1981 when its lyrics were rather different from the later released versions. The opening number of Thin Lizzy's live set during the Renegade world tour of 1981/2 when it heralded the band on stage with the sound of air-raid sirens, Angel of Death was also an integral part of the Thunder and Lightning live set in 1983.

== Versions ==
Three versions of the song performed by Thin Lizzy have been released:

Version 1. Studio recording. Lynott, Downey, Gorham, White, Wharton. Renegade album and released as a single 6'17"

Version 2. Live at Hammersmith Odeon, 27 November 1981. Lynott, Downey, Gorham, White, Wharton. Released as a bonus track on the Cold Sweat 12" and double single.

Version 3. Live probably at Hammersmith Odeon, 12 March 1983. Lynott, Downey, Gorham, Wharton, Sykes. Included on the Life album 5:56

The guitar solo on all three versions is by Scott Gorham.

== Background ==
The song was inspired by a book about the Prophesies of Nostradamus that Phil Lynott was reading. "It's a very popular book in France now. Recently its sales have picked up because of the depression and because of the Cold War. He said that an Angel of Death would come and create a holocaust which everybody considers to be a nuclear war." "I'd just finished reading the Prophesies of Nostradamus and I thought it would be a good idea to write about that. So I picked two great disasters that he prophesied and I gave the talking piece where I ask people do they believe it. Then I talk about a personal tragedy – a person watching his father die – a personal disaster and basically the Angel of Death coming down to destroy the world or to take you to hell. It isn't full of humour and life is it?"

Despite the lyrical content, in real life Lynott's father Cecil Parris was still alive at the time the song was recorded and would go on to outlive his son by 26 years before dying in 2012.

== Reaction ==
The track stood out on the Renegade album as a hard rocker in contrast to the other softer, more diverse tracks. However, it was not universally popular, even in the band. Scott Gorham has said: "I hated that song Angel of Death, even the title. C'mon, are we getting corny again? F••king hell." However, later guitarist John Sykes cited it as a reason he joined the band: "Did you hear the Renegade album? The band seemed to be losing the track of the rock feel of everything. Apart from the first track. Angel of Death was the best track."

== Covers ==
It has been covered by Iron Maiden - recorded during the A Matter of Life and Death album sessions but never released, death metal group Vader and power metal group Gamma Ray.
