= That Certain Thing =

That Certain Thing may refer to:

- That Certain Thing (film), a 1928 silent film comedy
- That Certain Thing (album), a 1987 album by Snowy White
