= The Way It Is =

The Way It Is may refer to:

== Music ==
=== Albums ===
- The Way It Is (Bruce Hornsby album) or the title song (see below), 1986
- The Way It Is (Glenn Hughes album) or the title song, 1999
- The Way It Is (John Williamson album), 1999
- The Way It Is (Keyshia Cole album), 2005
- The Way It Is (Snowy White album) or the title song, 2005
- The Way It Is (Valerie Carter album) or the title song, 1996
- The Way It Is, by Madasun, 2000

=== Songs ===
- "The Way It Is" (Bruce Hornsby song), 1986
- "The Way It Is" (Tesla song), 1990
- "Way It Is", by Justin Bieber, 2025
- "The Way It Is", by Emily Williams, 2015
- "The Way It Is", by Jennifer Lopez from Brave, 2007
- "The Way It Is", by Nicole Atkins from Neptune City, 2007
- "The Way It Is", by the Prodigy from Always Outnumbered, Never Outgunned, 2004
- "The Way It Is", by the Sheepdogs from The Sheepdogs, 2012
- "The Way It Is", by Simon Townshend, 1996
- "The Way It Is", by the Strokes from Room on Fire, 2003

== Other uses ==
- Keyshia Cole: The Way It Is, a 2006–2008 American reality TV series
- The Way It Is (TV series), a Canadian TV newsmagazine show of the 1960s
- The Way It Is (film), a 1985 American film
- The Way It Is (radio programme), a 1998–2001 British satirical radio series
- The Way It Is: New and Selected Poems, a 1999 posthumous collection by William Stafford

== See also ==
- That's the Way It Is (disambiguation)
- "Changes" (Tupac Shakur song), which samples the Bruce Hornsby song, 1998
