= Sapphire (John Martyn album) =

Studio album by John Martyn
- Released: November 1984
- Studio: Compass Point Studios (Nassau, Bahamas): CaVa Sound Workshops (Glasgow, Scotland); Genetic Studios (Berkshire, England); Fallout Shelter (Hammersmith, London)
- Genre: Rock
- Length: 40:32
- Label: Island
- Producer: John Martyn

John Martyn chronology
Well Kept Secret (1982)	Sapphire (1984)	Piece by Piece (1986)

Sapphire is a rock album by John Martyn, who by this stage in his career had almost entirely abandoned the acoustic guitar and folk approach in favour of a glossy pop/rock sound.

Recorded at Compass Point Studios, Nassau, Bahamas and CaVa Sound Workshops, Glasgow, Scotland, the album was originally released on LP by Island in 1984, catalogue number ILPS 9779, with photography by Anton Corbijn and a cover illustration by Cathie Felstead.

Robert Palmer assisted in the later stages of the recording and the LP liner notes acknowledge his help: "An extra special thank you to Robert Palmer without whose help this album may never have been made."

== Track listing ==
All tracks composed by John Martyn except where indicated.

1. "Sapphire" - 4:42
2. "Over The Rainbow" (Harold Arlen, Yip Harburg) - 3:21
3. "You Know" - 3:14
4. "Watching Her Eyes" - 3:15
5. "Fisherman's Dream" - 4:16
6. "Acid Rain" (Martyn, Alan Thomson) - 4:11
7. "Mad Dog Days" (Martyn, Alan Thomson) - 4:59
8. "Climb The Walls" - 4:14
9. "Coming In On Time" - 3:34
10. "Rope-Soul'd" (Martyn, Alan Thomson, Barry Reynolds) - 4:46

== Personnel ==
- John Martyn – vocals, guitars, LinnDrum
- James Hooker – keyboards
- Jim Prime – keyboards
- Robin Rankin – keyboards
- Jack Waldman – keyboards
- Alan Thomson – keyboards, bass guitar, LinnDrum
- Barry Reynolds – additional guitars
- Steven Stanley – LinnDrum
- Andy Lyden – LinnDrum
- Uziah "Sticky" Thompson – percussion
- Colin Tully – saxophones
- Lorna Brooks – harmony vocals
- Morwenne Laidlaw – harmony vocals
- Terry Neason – harmony vocals
- Choral section by S.N.O.; arranged by Dave Murricane.

=== Production ===
- John Martyn – producer
- Brian Young – engineer
- Benji Armbrister – assistant engineer
- Frank Gibson – assistant engineer
- Kendal Stubbs – assistant engineer
- Andy Lyden – mixing (1)
- Harvey Goldberg – mixing (2–9)
- Stephen Street – mix assistant (2–9)
- Cathie Felstead – cover illustration
- Anton Corbijn – photography
