= Hollywood (Down on Your Luck) =

1982 single by Thin Lizzy

- Single sleeve artwork

Single by Thin Lizzy

from the album Renegade
- B-side: "The Pressure Will Blow"
- Released: February 1982
- Recorded: 1981
- Genre: Hard rock
- Length: 4:09
- Label: Vertigo
- Songwriter(s): Scott Gorham, Phil Lynott
- Producer(s): Thin Lizzy and Chris Tsangarides

"Hollywood (Down on Your Luck)" is a song by the Irish rock band Thin Lizzy, written by guitarist Scott Gorham and bassist/vocalist Phil Lynott, and released as a single in 1982. It was the only single to be released from their 1981 album Renegade.

== Single release ==
The opening track on Side 2 of Renegade, "Hollywood (Down on Your Luck)" was released as a single in February 1982, over three months after the album which had been released the previous November. Vertigo Records refused to finance a promotional video for the song, which contributed to a relatively poor chart placing compared to past singles. In the UK, "Hollywood" reached no. 53, which apart from the previous single, "Trouble Boys", which also reached no. 53, was the lowest chart placing for a Thin Lizzy single in the UK since "Wild One" failed to chart in 1975. In Ireland, the single did not chart at all, again the worst performance since the mid-1970s. It did, however, reach no. 24 on the US Mainstream Rock chart.

=== Other countries and formats ===
"Hollywood" was released in various territories, all with the same picture sleeve or with a plain record company sleeve. In the UK a 7" picture disc was also released, in a plain plastic sleeve. The first 30,000 singles were picture discs and the remainder were black vinyl.

In the Netherlands, the usual b-side "The Pressure Will Blow" was replaced with another track from Renegade, "Mexican Blood".

In Canada, the b-side of the single was "Girls", written by Lynott, former Thin Lizzy guitarist Brian Robertson and ex-Rainbow bassist Jimmy Bain. "Girls" was not a Thin Lizzy recording, having previously appeared on Lynott's solo album Solo in Soho.

== TV performance ==
The poor chart showing of the single was despite exposure on primetime television in the UK, when the band performed the single as guests on BBC One's Saturday evening show Jim'll Fix It, on 9 January 1982. The show normally made arrangements for children to have their wishes granted but on this occasion, May Booker, a grandmother in her 70s, had asked if she could perform with Thin Lizzy. The song was slightly rearranged for the purposes of the TV performance, with Lynott singing slightly different lyrics, and Booker playing a keyboard solo that she had written herself. The band's regular keyboard player, Darren Wharton, performed alongside her. She also contributed backing vocals together with Wharton, Gorham and the band's other guitarist Snowy White. Afterwards, Lynott and the show's host Jimmy Savile presented Booker with the usual Jim'll Fix It medal, some Thin Lizzy memorabilia and a framed copy of the sheet music for her solo.

== Cover version ==
Warrant covered the song on their 2001 cover album, Under The Influence.

"Hollywood" was covered by Adler's Appetite on their 2005 EP of the same name.

== Personnel ==
- Phil Lynott – bass guitar, vocals
- Scott Gorham – lead and rhythm guitar
- Snowy White – lead and rhythm guitar
- Darren Wharton – keyboards
- Brian Downey – drums

== Charts ==
Chart (1982)	Peak position
UK Singles (OCC)	53
US Mainstream Rock (Billboard)	24
