= Arthur's Club-Geneve 1995 =

Live album by Mick Taylor & Snowy White
- Released: 21 October 1995
- Recorded: 4 April 1995
- Genre: Blues rock
- Length: 76:30
- Label: Dirty Pig
- Producer: Mick Taylor

Arthur's Club-Geneve 1995 was a 75-minute performance in Geneva by blues guitarist Mick Taylor, featuring Snowy White, recorded for a television special and a promotional album. It consists of a collections of blues classics, a Jimi Hendrix song and a Rolling Stones song with long jams.

== Track listing ==
1. "You Gotta Move" (Mississippi Fred McDowell) - 13:47
2. "I Wonder Why" (Albert King) - 12:18
3. "You Shook Me" (Willie Dixon, J. B. Lenoir) - 15:39
4. "Judgment Day" (Snowy White) - 5:09
5. "Little Wing" (Jimi Hendrix) - 6:54
6. "Can't You Hear Me Knocking" (Mick Jagger, Keith Richards) - 22:40

== Personnel ==
- Mick Taylor - guitar, vocals
- Snowy White - guitar, vocals
- Kuma Harada - bass guitar
- John "Rabbit" Bundrick - piano, organ, keyboards
- Jeff Allen - drums, percussion
