= White Flames =

Studio album by Snowy White
- Released: August 1983
- Recorded: Winter 1982
- Studio: Good Earth Studios
- Genre: Blues rock
- Length: 48:26 (CD)
- Label: Towerbell (LP), Repertoire (CD)
- Producer: Tom Newman, Kuma Harada

Snowy White chronology
White Flames (1983)	Snowy White (1984)

White Flames is the first solo album by British blues guitarist Snowy White, released in 1983. It includes the song "Bird of Paradise", which reached No. 6 on the UK charts when it was released as a single.

The album has been issued with several different track lists and at least once under the title Bird of Paradise, after the hit single. It was remastered and reissued on CD in 2010 with the bonus track "For the Rest of My Life", a non-album B-side recorded live in the studio. Several songs differ slightly between the vinyl and CD editions of the album, with alternative mixes or edits in addition to the altered running order.

Professional ratings
Review scores
Source	Rating
Allmusic	3/5 stars

== Track listing ==
All tracks are written by Snowy White.

Original UK LP
No.	Title	Length
1.	"Lucky Star"	6:41
2.	"Bird of Paradise"	5:03
3.	"The Journey – Part I"	3:28
4.	"The Journey – Part II"	2:52
5.	"Don't Turn Back"	3:48
6.	"It's No Secret"	3:50
7.	"Lucky I've Got You"	3:57
8.	"The Answer"	3:36
9.	"Open Carefully"	3:08
10.	"At the Crossroads"	4:44

2010 CD
No.	Title	Length
1.	"Open Carefully"	3:09
2.	"At the Crossroads"	4:51
3.	"The Journey (Part I)"	3:46
4.	"The Journey (Part II)"	2:50
5.	"Lucky Star"	7:02
6.	"It's No Secret"	3:51
7.	"Don't Turn Back"	3:50
8.	"Bird of Paradise"	5:00
9.	"Lucky I've Got You"	3:57
10.	"The Answer"	3:37
11.	"For the Rest of My Life" (recorded live)	8:24

== Personnel ==
- Snowy White – guitars, vocals
- Kuma Harada – bass guitar, double bass
- Jess Bailey – keyboards, moog synthesizer, electric piano (except tracks 1, 2) (LP)
- Richard Bailey – drums, percussion
- Godfrey Wang – string synthesizer (tracks 1, 2) (LP)

== Production ==
- Tom Newman – producer (except tracks 1, 2), engineer (except tracks 1, 7)
- Kuma Harada – producer (tracks 1, 2)
- Snowy White – production assistant
- Martin Adam – remixing and engineering (tracks 1, 2)
- Chris Porter – engineer
- Bernd Matheja – sleeve notes (CD)
- Alan Ballard – photography (LP back sleeve)
- Chris Craymer – photography
- Kouji Shimamura – cover concept and artwork
- Bob England – project director

== Charts ==
Chart (1984)	Peak position
Australian Albums (Kent Music Report)	34
Dutch Albums (Album Top 100)	7
UK Albums (OCC)	21
