= Cathie Felstead =

English illustrator

- Born: 1954 (age 71–72); Welwyn Garden City, United Kingdom
- Education: Royal College of Art
- Occupation: Illustrator

Cathie Felstead (born 1954 in Welwyn Garden City, Hertfordshire) is an English illustrator.

== Early life and education ==
Felstead attended Chelsea School of Art where she gained a BA in graphic design. She then studied illustration at the Royal College of Art, graduating with a Master of Arts in 1980.

== Career ==
Felstead commenced her career by creating designs for book covers. Among the authors whose books she worked on were William Golding (including Rites of Passage), Iris Murdoch (including The Philosopher's Pupil), Isabel Allende, Nadine Gordimer, and Alice Walker. She has produced artwork for advertising campaigns, packaging, T-shirts, opera, ballet, television, magazines, greeting cards and books. Felstead's commercial clients have included British Airways, Channel 4, Ballet Rambert, Fiat, Oxfam, Lynx (the anti fur trade organisation), Walker Books, Barclays Bank, the Glastonbury Festivals, Penguin Books, Radio Times, and The Body Shop. She also created the cover illustration for John Martyn's 1984 album Sapphire.

Her artwork has been shown in many exhibitions in Britain and abroad. She was runner-up in the Mother Goose Award for her illustrations in A Caribbean Dozen and has also received awards for book illustration in the United States.

Reviewers have praised the wide range of media and styles which Felstead uses in her work, as well as the way they "realize and complement" the texts. A Caribbean Dozen, one reviewer said, "is made even more attractive by the wide-ranging artwork of Ms. Felstead. Her styles sweep from collages to pastels, watercolors to oils to inks. Some illustrations are bold and primitive, others impressionistic." The Circle of Days, an adaptation of Canticle of the Sun, is made "outstanding [by] .. the immediacy of Ms. Lindbergh's verse and the beauty of Ms. Felstead's collage paintings, which combine childlike cut-paper images with earthy watercolour and gouache backgrounds. Just like the writing, what at first appears simple is actually quite complex." In Who Made Me?, a reviewer found, "The art matches the text in its mood--it, too, is reverent but childlike. Mixed-media illustrations combining paints with delicate cut-paper work, they capture the awe-inspiring vastness of the African landscape as well as the intimacy and warmth of Zanele's relationship to her homeland and her seven friends." In Flamingo Dream, another reviewer said, "The art is a wonderful collage mix: objects, torn paper, and childlike drawings colored in pencil or crayon, echo the honesty and realism in the text and are exactly what this little girl would have drawn or collected." One reviewer said about Earthshake - Poems from the Ground Up, "Felstead’s energetic collages of maps, tiny photocopied figures, colored pencil, and paint marvelously evocate action and mood."

Cathie Felstead lives in Ashwell, Hertfordshire.

== Bibliography ==
- 1994 - A Caribbean Dozen: Poems from Caribbean Poets, John Agard and Grace Nichols, editors; Cathie Felstead, illustrator
- 1998 - The Circle of Days, Reeve Lindbergh, author; Cathie Felstead, illustrator
- 2000 - Who Made Me?, Shirley Tullock, author; Cathie Felstead, illustrator
- 2000 - Big Wolf and Little Wolf, Sharon Phillips Denslow, author; Cathie Felstead, illustrator
- 2002 - Flamingo Dream, Donna J. Napoli, author; Cathie Felstead, illustrator
- 2003 - Earthshake - Poems from the Ground Up, Lisa Westberg Peters, author; Cathie Felstead, illustrator
- 2006 - An Island Grows, Lola M. Schaefer, author; Cathie Felstead, illustrator
- 2007 - Family Lullaby, Jody Fickes Shapiro, author; Cathie Felstead, illustrator
