= Mates on the Road =

Live album by John Williamson with Warren H. Williams and Pixie Jenkins
- Released: 23 February 2004
- Recorded: July 2003
- Label: EMI Music

John Williamson albums chronology
True Blue Two (2003)	Mates on the Road (2004)	From Bulldust to Bitumen: 20 Queensland Songs (2005)

Mates on the Road is a live album by Australian country music artist John Williamson with fiddle player Pixie Jenkins and country music singer Warren H. Williams. The album was recorded during the True Blue Reunion tour in support on the 2003 album True Blue Two. The album was released on 2xCD and on DVD in February 2004.

== Track listing ==
CD 1
No.	Title	Writer(s)	Length
1.	"Mallee Boy"	John Williamson	3:28
2.	"Dear Little Quambatook"	Williamson	3:33
3.	"Chook Routine"	Williamson	1:16
4.	"It Goes Without Saying"		3:17
5.	"Cracker Night"		2:56
6.	"Flower on the Water"		3:16
7.	"Forty Years Ago"		3:38
8.	"Hawkesbury River Lovin'"	Williamson	4:07
9.	"The Flight of the Blowfly" (with Warren H. Williams)		1:55
10.	"Boomerang Café"	Williamson	3:45
11.	"Buried in Her Bedclothes"		3:47
12.	"You and My Guitar"	Williamson	2:49
13.	"Galleries of Pink Galahs"	Williamson	4:01
14.	"Cootamundra Wattle"	Williamson	4:09

CD 2
No.	Title	Writer(s)	Length
1.	"Old Man Emu"	Williamson	3:50
2.	"Teach Me to Drive, Dad" (with Warren H. Williams)	Williamson	5:14
3.	"Cape York Peninsula"	Williamson	3:47
4.	"Crocodile Roll"	Williamson	3:12
5.	"Wrinkles"		4:58
6.	"Diamantina Drover"	Hugh McDonald	3:09
7.	"Amazing Day"	Williamson	2:53
8.	"Three Sons"		3:35
9.	"Keeper of the Stones"		4:20
10.	"A Thousand Feet" (with Warren H. Williams)		2:55
11.	"What a Place" (with Warren H. Williams)		2:49
12.	"Raining on the Rock" (with Warren H. Williams, Pixie Jenkins)	Williamson	4:36
13.	"Chain Around My Ankle"		1:11
14.	"I Can't Feel Those Chains Any Longer"		2:13
15.	"Diggers of the ANZAC"	Williamson	3:05
16.	"Waltzing Matilda"	Banjo Patterson	4:02
17.	"A Number On My Back" (with Warren H. Williams, Pixie Jenkins)		3:38
18.	"True Blue"	Williamson	4:15
19.	"A Bushman Can't Survive"	Williamson	3:50
20.	"Glory to Australia"		3:00
21.	"Mates On the Road" (with Warren H. Williams, Pixie Jenkins)		2:44

== Charts ==
Chart performance for Mates on the Road
Chart (2004)	Peak position
Australian Albums (ARIA)	98
Australian Country Albums (ARIA)	6
Australian Music DVDs (ARIA)	18

== Release history ==
Release history and formats for Mates on the Road
Country	Date	Format	Label	Catalogue
Australia	23 February 2004	2×CD	EMI Music	5981832
Australia	23 February 2004	DVD	EMI Music	
Australia	11 July 2014	2×CD; DD	Warner Music Australia	5419625852
