= Change My Life =

Studio album by Snowy White
- Released: 1988
- Recorded: 1988
- Genre: Blues
- Label: Bellaphon Records
- Producer: The Blues Agency

Snowy White chronology
| That Certain Thing (1987) | Change My Life (1988) | Open for Business (1989) |

Change My Life is the fourth solo album by British blues guitarist Snowy White, and the first under the Snowy White's Blues Agency name, released in 1988.

White retained the services of bassist Kuma Harada, who had featured on his first three solo albums, and they were joined for this album by singer Graham Bell, who had previously worked with Skip Bifferty and Long John Baldry. The album featured five original tracks and seven cover versions of old blues songs.

== Track listing ==
1. "Woke Up This Morning" (B.B. King) – 4:27
2. "The Thrill is Gone" (Roy Hawkins) – 4:09
3. "You Know It Ain't Right" (Walter Jacobs) – 2:57
4. "Change My Life" (Snowy White, Kuma Harada, Graham Bell, Jeff Allen) – 6:25
5. "The Agency Blues" (White, Harada, Bell, Allen) – 3:32
6. "Judgement Day" (White) – 5:02
7. "Ooh-Wee Baby" (Willie Dixon) – 3:24
8. "The Rest of My Life" (White) – 5:22
9. "Parchman Farm" (Mose Allison) – 3:53
10. "The Agency Shuffle" (White, Harada, Bell, Allen) – 3:33
11. "Another Man" (Trad. arr. Bell) – 1:50
12. "No Place to Go" (Chester Burnett) – 4:28 [bonus track]

== Personnel ==
- Snowy White – lead guitar, rhythm guitar
- Graham Bell – vocals, harmonica
- Kuma Harada – bass guitar
- Jeff Allen – drums, percussion
- Recorded at Studio House, Wraysbury, Berkshire
- Engineer – John Burns
- Executive producers – Brian Adams, Van Kaiser
- Photography – Garry Clarke
