= Well Kept Secret (John Martyn album) =

Studio album by John Martyn
- Released: August 1982
- Studio: RAK Studios, London
- Genre: Pop rock
- Length: 37:08
- Label: WEA
- Producer: Sandy Roberton

John Martyn chronology
Glorious Fool (1981)	Well Kept Secret (1982)	Sapphire (1984)

Professional ratings
Review scores
Source	Rating
AllMusic	3/5 stars

Well Kept Secret is John Martyn's second and final album for WEA. It was released in 1982. "Never Let Me Go" featured Ronnie Scott on saxophone. Recorded at RAK Studios, London.

== Track listing ==
All tracks composed by John Martyn except where indicated.

1. "Could've Been Me" – 3:44
2. "You Might Need a Man" – 3:09
3. "Hung Up" – 3:58
4. "Gun Money" – 5:01
5. "Never Let Me Go" (Joseph Scott) – 2:48
6. "Love Up" – 3:19
7. "Changes Her Mind" – 4:35
8. "Hiss on the Tape" – 3:59
9. "Back with a Vengeance" – 3:08
10. "Livin' Alone" – 3:27

== Personnel ==
- John Martyn – vocals, guitars
- Jim Prime – keyboards
- Geraint Watkins – accordion
- Pete Wingfield – keyboards (7)
- Alan Thomson – guitars, bass
- Jeff Allen – drums (1–6, 8, 10)
- Andy Duncan – drums (7, 9)
- Danny Cummings – percussion
- Mel Collins – saxophones, flute
- Ronnie Scott – saxophone (5)
- Martin Drover – trumpet
- Lee Kosmin – harmony vocals
- Stevie Lange – harmony vocals

=== Production ===
- Sandy Roberton – producer
- Phil Thornalley – engineer
- Mike Nocito – recording
- Bill Smith – sleeve
- Andrew Douglas – photography
