= Singing in the Suburbs =

Live album by John Williamson
- Released: 1983
- Venues: Collector Tavern, Smithfield Tavern
- Labels: Gumleaf Records, Festival Records
- Producer: Phil Matthews

John Williamson chronology
Fair Dinkum J.W. (1982)	Singing in the Suburbs (1983)	The Smell of Gum Leaves (1984)

Singles from Singing in the Suburbs
- 1. "The Vasectomy Song" Released: November 1983; 2. "Lillee and McEnroe" Released: January 1984

Alternative cover
- John Williamson Live (1996 re-release)

Singing in the Suburbs is the first solo live album by Australian country music artist John Williamson. The album was released in 1983. The album included the track "The Vasectomy Song", which peaked at number 28 on the Kent Music Report, which remains Williamson's second highest-charting single, behind "Old Man Emu".

The album was re-released in 1996 under the title John Williamson Live and again in 2000 under the title Waltzing Matilda: John Williamson Live .

== Track listing ==
Side A
No.	Title	Writer(s)	Length
1.	"It's Good To Be Me"	Tony Dennett	3:37
2.	"Lillee and McEnroe"	Williamson	2:40
3.	"The Vasectomy Song"	Williamson	4:30
4.	"The Sheik of Scrubby Creek" (A Salute to Chad Morgan)	Chad Morgan	4:05
5.	"Waratah Rock 'N Roll Ball" (A Salute to Chad Morgan)	Williamson	3:30
6.	"Bound for South Australia"	traditional	2:30
7.	"And the Band Played Waltzing Matilda"	Eric Bogle	5:50

Side B
No.	Title	Writer(s)	Length
1.	"Singing at a Party"	Williamson	5:10
2.	"Chain Around My Ankle"	Williamson	2:50
3.	"I Can't Feel Those Chains Any Longer"	Williamson	4:03
4.	"Botany Bay"	traditional	2:55
5.	"Stuffed If I Know"	B. J. Black, Williamson	3:45
6.	"Home Among The Gum Trees"	Wally Johnson, Bob Brown	3:10
7.	"Waltzing Matilda"	Banjo Patterson	3:05

== Release history ==
Country	Title	Date	Format	Label	Catalogue
Australia	Singing in the Suburbs	1993	Vinyl Record; CD; Cassette	Gum Leaf, Festival Records	L38100
Australia	John Williamson Live	1996	CD	EMI Music	8146532
Australia	Waltzing Matilda – John Williamson Live	2000	CD	EMI Music	8145782
