= Sir Don =

Single by John Williamson

from the album Pipe Dream
- Released: June 1996
- Genre: Country
- Label: EMI Music
- Songwriter(s): John Williamson
- Producer(s): John Williamson

John Williamson singles chronology
"Tropical Fever" (1994)	"Sir Don" (1996)	"Bush Telegraph" (1997)

Sir Don is a song written and recorded by Australian country singer John Williamson. The song is a tribute to Australian cricketer, Donald Bradman and $1 from each sale went towards the Bradman Museum. The song was released in June 1996 as the lead single from Williamson's thirteenth studio album Pipe Dream and peaked at number 72 on the ARIA Charts.

Following Bradman's death in February 2001, Williamson performed the track at Bradman's Memorial Service at St Peter's Cathedral, Adelaide. The original scraps of paper this song was written on have been framed and hang in the Bradman Museum at Bowral.

== Track listing ==
No.	Title	Length
1.	"Sir Don"
2.	"My Oath to Australia"
3.	"Paint Me a Wheelbarrow"
4.	"Sydney 2000"

== Charts ==
Chart performance for "Sir Don"
Chart (1996)	Peak position
Australia (ARIA)	72

== Release history ==
Region	Date	Format	Edition(s)	Label	Catalogue
Australia	June 1996	Cassette; CD single	Standard	EMI Music	8740883
