= The Way It Is (Snowy White album) =

The Way It Is ...

Studio album by Snowy White & the White Flames
- Released: 21 June 2005
- Recorded: September 2001–early 2005
- Genre: Blues rock
- Length: 50:45
- Label: White Flames Records
- Producer: Snowy White

Snowy White & the White Flames chronology
Restless (1970)	The Way It Is ... (2005)	The Way It Is...Live! (2005)

Professional ratings
Review scores
Source	Rating
AllMusic	

The Way It Is ... is the comeback album by blues guitarist Snowy White, featuring his band, The White Flames, with two new 2004 members: Max Middleton and Richard Bailey, released in 2005 by his Record Company: White Flames Records. It was recorded between 2001 & 2005, featuring early White Flames drummer Juan Van Emmerloot and keyboardist John "Rabbit" Bundrick, .

This is the new album including a new acoustic version of the 1983 hit, "Bird of Paradise", and a blues version of Peter Green's "Black Magic Woman".

== Track listing ==
All songs by Snowy White, except where noted.

1. "No Stranger to the Blues" (Snowy White/Gilchrist/Gil Marais) – 3:24
2. "Bird of Paradise" – 3:43
3. "Black Magic Woman" (Peter Green) – 3:17
4. "What I'm Searching For" – 5:17
5. "Angel Inside You (Part 1)" – 4:08
6. "Angel Inside You (Part 2)" – 5:17
7. "Falling" – 4:24
8. "The Way It Is" – 3:48
9. "A Piece of your Love" – 3:51
10. "This Time of My Life" – 4:38
11. "Easy" (Snowy White/Walter Latupeirissa/Juan Van Emmerloot) – 3:25
12. "Sweet Bluesmaker" – 5:26

== Personnel ==
=== Snowy White & The White Flames ===
- Snowy White: Guitars, bass guitar, keyboards, piano, percussion, congas, vocals.
- Walter Latupeirissa: Bass guitar, guitars, keyboards, percussion, vocals.
- Max Middleton: Keyboards, piano, Hammond Organ.
- Richard Bailey: Drums, percussion, congas, shakers, synthesizer, Bodhran (Tracks 4–12).

=== Guest musicians ===
- Kuma Harada: Bass guitar, guitars, percussion, keyboards.
- John "Rabbit" Bundrick: Keyboards, organ, piano.
- Juan Van Emmerloot: Percussion, congas, maracas (Tracks 1–3).
- Orlando Sandoval: Piano, keyboards (Tracks 2–3).
- James Lascelles: Keyboards, Hammond organ.
- Dawn Knight: Backing vocals.
- Ray Carless: Sax.

=== Production ===
- Snowy White: Producer.
- Kuma Harada: Engineer.
- Noel Haris: Engineer.
- Curtis Schwartz: Engineer.
- Denis Blackham: Mastering.
