= The Smell of Gum Leaves =

Live album by John Williamson
- Released: September 1984
- Recorded: 28 April 1984
- Venue: The Vicar of Wakefield, Dural, New South Wales
- Label: Gumleaf Records, Festival Records
- Producer: John Williamson

John Williamson chronology
Singing in the Suburbs (1983)	The Smell of Gum Leaves (1984)	Humble Beginnings (1985)

Singles from The Smell of Gum Leaves
- 1. "I'm Fair Dinkum" Released: July 1984; 2. "Dad's Flowers" Released: December 1984

Alternative cover
- Home Among the Gum Tree (1997 re-release)

The Smell of Gum Leaves is the second solo live album by Australian country music artist John Williamson. The album was released in September 1984 and become Williamsons' first charting album; peaking at number 49 on the Kent Music Report.

At the Country Music Awards of Australia in January 1985, Williamson won his first golden guitar award; winning 'Song of the Year' for "Queen in the Sport of Kings".

The album was re-released in 1997 under the title Home Among the Gum Trees.

== Track listing ==
Side A
No.	Title	Writer(s)	Length
1.	"Dad's Flowers"	Tony Dennett	3:40
2.	"The Bush Barber"	Williamson	2:55
3.	"Good Tobacci When I Smoke"	Slim Dusty	2:55
4.	"The Trees Have Now Gone"	Williamson	4:05
5.	"The Last of the Pioneers"	Williamson	4:00
6.	"Queen in the Sport of Kings"	Williamson	3:55
7.	"I've Always Been A Drover"	Williamson	3:40

Side B
No.	Title	Writer(s)	Length
1.	"I'm Fair Dinkum"	Williamson	3:15
2.	"Drunken Duncan" (as Merv Currawong)	Williamson, Pat Alexander	2:00
3.	"Stoned This Afternoon" (as Chad Morgan)		2:12
4.	"Billabong"	Williamson	3:00
5.	"Only 19"	John Schumann	4:50
6.	"We Will Stop the War"	Williamson, Ami Williamson, Georgie Williamson	4:07
7.	"I'll Be Gone"	Mike Rudd	3:45

== Charts ==
Chart (1984)	Peak position
Australian Kent Music Report Albums Chart	49

== Release history ==
Country	Title	Date	Format	Label	Catalogue
Australia	The Smell of Gum Leaves	September 1984	Vinyl Record; CD; Cassette	Gum Leaf, Festival Records	L38245
Australia	Home Among the Gum Trees	1997	CD	EMI Music	724381457627
