= All the Best (John Williamson album) =

Compilation album by John Williamson
- Released: July 1986
- Recorded: 1970–1986
- Label: Gumleaf Records, Festival Records, EMI Music
- Producer: John Williamson

John Williamson chronology
Road Thru the Heart (1985)	All the Best (1986)	Mallee Boy (1986)

Singles from All the Best
- 1. "Goodbye Blinky Bill" Released: March 1986

All the Best is a compilation album by Australian country music artist John Williamson. The album was released in July 1986 and peaked at number 27 on the Kent Music Report. The album includes Williamson's debut single "Old Man Emu" from 1970 and includes one new track "Goodbye Blinky Bill".

== Track listing ==
Side A - Studio
No.	Title	Writer(s)	Length
1.	"You and My Guitar"	John Williamson	2:47
2.	"Goodbye Blinky Bill" (with Bullamakanka and Ami & George Williamson)	Williamson	3:30
3.	"Just a Dog"	Williamson	3:20
4.	"Wrinkles"	Williamson	4:38
5.	"Diggers of the ANZAC"	Williamson	3:37
6.	"Old Man Emu"	Williamson	2:52
7.	"The Shed"	Williamson, Tony Dennett	2:39
8.	"Hawkesbury River Lovin'"	Williamson	3:31
9.	"The Breaker" (with Bud Tingwell)	Williamson	4:04
Total length:			31:58

Side B - Live
No.	Title	Writer(s)	Length
1.	"I'm Fair Dinkum"	Williamson	3:29
2.	"The Bush Barber"	Williamson	3:00
3.	"Dad's Flowers"	Dennett	3:42
4.	"Billabong"	Williamson	3:15
5.	"Chain Around My Ankle"	Williamson	2:32
6.	"I Can't Feel Those Chains Any Longer"	Williamson	3:31
7.	"The Vasectomy Song"	Williamson	3:52
8.	"Stuffed If I Know"	B.J Vidler, Williamson	3:36
9.	"Home Among The Gum Trees"	Wally Johnson, Bob Brown	3:03
Total length:			30:00

== Charts ==
Chart (1986)	Peak position
Australian Kent Music Report Albums Chart	27

== Release history ==
Country	Date	Format	Label	Catalogue
Australia	July 1986	Vinyl record; Cassette	Gum Leaf, Festival Records	RML 53190
