= That's the Way It Is =

That's the Way It Is may refer to:

- That's the Way It Is (Milt Jackson album), a 1969 album by the jazz vibraphone player Milt Jackson
- ...That's the Way It Is, a 1976 album by Harry Nilsson
- That's the Way It Is (Elvis Presley album), a 1970 album by Elvis Presley
- "That's the Way It Is" (Celine Dion song), a 1999 song by Celine Dion
- "That's the Way It Is" (Johnny Mathis song), a 1962 song by Johnny Mathis
- "That's the Way It Is" (Mel and Kim song), a 1988 song performed by Mel and Kim Appleby
- "Kore ga Watashi no Ikiru Michi" ("That's the Way It Is"), a song by Puffy AmiYumi
- "And that's the way it is...", the sign-off/catchphrase of American television journalist Walter Cronkite
- Elvis: That's the Way It Is, a 1970 documentary film about Elvis Presley

== See also ==
- "That's Just the Way It Is", a 1990 song by Phil Collins
- The Way It Is (disambiguation)
