= Bullamakanka =

Australian country music band

- Origin: Australia
- Genres: country music
- Years active: 1978–present
- Labels: Mercury, RCA, EMI
- Past members: Ray Young, Dave Ovenden, Rex Radonich (1978-1986), Rod McCormack (1986-)

Bullamakanka was an Australian country music trio formed in 1978. The band toured extensively throughout the 1980s and their distinctive melding of Australian bush music with American bluegrass gained them a large following.

In 1986, Rex Radonich died in a car accident and Rod McCormack joined the band. The band's single, "Home Amongst the Gum Trees", brought them a considerable measure of crossover success.

Ray Young died of liver cancer in March 2004.

== Discography ==
=== Albums ===
==== Studio albums ====
List of studio albums, with Australian positions
Title	Details	Peak chart positions
Title	Details	AUS
Bullamakanka	Released: May 1982; Label: Mercury (6437150); Formats: Cassette, LP	97
In Search of	Released: June 1983; Label: RCA (VPL1-0415); Formats: cassette, LP	88
From the Heart	Released: 1988; Label: True Blue Records (463253-1); Formats: cassette, LP	-

==== Live albums ====
List of live albums
Title	Details
Bullas Live	Released: 1985; Label: EMI (EMX.430029)

==== Compilation albums ====
List of compilation albums
Title	Details
The Best of Bullamakanka	Released: 1993; Label: Music World (MWCD-306)
Then and Now: The Best of Bullamakanka	Released: 2001; Label: MasterSong (504422)

=== Singles ===
List of singles, with Australian chart positions
Year	Title	Peak chart positions	Album
Year	Title	AUS	Album
1982	"Waratah and Wattle"	-	Bullamakanka
1982	"Home Among the Gumtrees"	88	Bullamakanka
1983	"Dr Who"	-	In Search Of
1983	"Gaylene" / "Dingo Hang Dog Blues"	-	In Search Of
1986	"Goodbye Blinky Bill" (with John Williamson)	-	All the Best (John Williamson album)
1988	"Ride These Roads"	-	From the Heart
1990	"Dust"	-	

== Awards ==
=== Country Music Awards of Australia ===
The Country Music Awards of Australia (CMAA) (also known as the Golden Guitar Awards) is an annual awards night held in January during the Tamworth Country Music Festival, celebrating recording excellence in the Australian country music industry. They have been held annually since 1973.

Year	Nominee / work	Award	Result
1982	"Home Among the Gum Trees"	Vocal Group or Duo of the Year	Won
1984	"Gaylene"	Vocal Group or Duo of the Year	Won
1985	"G'Day"	Vocal Group or Duo of the Year	Won
1989	"Bullabounce"	Instrumental of the Year	Won
1990	"Ride These Roads"	Vocal Group or Duo of the Year	Won
1991	"Dust"	Vocal Group or Duo of the Year	Won

- Note: wins only
