= The Big Red =

Studio album by John Williamson
- Released: 27 January 2012
- Recorded: 2011
- Studios: ENREC Studios, Sony Music Studio; Tamworth, New South Wales, Australia
- Length: 39:05
- Label: Warner Music Australia
- Producer: John Williamson

John Williamson chronology
John Williamson in Symphony (2011)	The Big Red (2012)	Hell of a Career (2013)

Singles from The Big Red
- 1. "Hang My Hat in Queensland" Released: 16 December 2011; 2. "The Big Red" Released: 2 July 2012; 3. "Prairie Hotel Parachilna" Released: 11 January 2013

The Big Red is the eighteenth studio album by Australian country music artist John Williamson. It was released in January 2012 and peaked at number 15 on the ARIA Charts. It was the first all-original album in almost four years for Williamson. The album was supported with a national tour.

== Singles ==
- "Hang My Hat in Queensland" was released in December 2011 as the album's lead single. It's an autobiographical song that follows his life from the Mallee region in Victoria, on to Sydney and up to Queensland where he and partner Meg live part of the year in the Gold Coast hinterland. Williamson sings of his love of their mountain retreat in this land of mangoes and warm beaches in June and July.
- "The Big Red" was released in July 2012 as the album's second single. Williamson said "That's just about being in the city and wanting to get out and I think it's one of those songs that bush people will get into more than anything."
- "Prairie Hotel Parachilna" video was released in December 2012, with the digital single being released in January 2013. The song was written after a trip to the South Australian pub.

== Reception ==
98.9 FM reviewed The Big Red as the album of the week saying "There are twelve tracks on this release, not one that doesn't stand up to the quality that the iconic songwriter is known for. Each one is crafted perfectly and sure to become chants, wedding first dance tracks or songs to belt out amongst friends and family around the fire, lounge room or penthouse apartment."

== Track listing ==
No.	Title	Writer(s)	Length
1.	"Kissing on a City Corner"	John Williamson	2:16
2.	"The Big Red"	Williamson	3:47
3.	"Marree Girl"	Williamson	2:58
4.	"Prairie Hotel Parachilna"	Williamson	2:56
5.	"Rescue Me"	Williamson	3:51
6.	"Hang My Hat in Queensland"	Williamson	4:44
7.	"Look Out Cunnamulla"	Williamson	3:00
8.	"Mates Around the Fire"	Williamson	2:51
9.	"The Weight of a Man"	Alan Doyle, Russell Crowe	3:36
10.	"I'm a Basher"	Williamson	3:20
11.	"Movie Star"	Williamson	3:18
12.	"The Men of League"	Williamson	2:35

== Charts ==
=== Weekly charts ===
Chart (2012)	Peak position
Australian Albums (ARIA)	15

=== Year-end charts ===
Chart (2012)	Position
ARIA Country Albums Chart	18

== Release history ==
Country	Date	Format	Label	Catalogue
Australia	27 January 2012	CD; DD	Shrinesong, Warner Music Australia	5310507502
