= John Williamson in Symphony =

Live album by John Williamson with the Sydney Symphony
- Released: 28 January 2011
- Recorded: October 2010
- Venue: Sydney Opera House
- Label: Warner Music Australia
- Producer: John Williamson

John Williamson albums chronology
Absolute Greatest: 40 Years True Blue (2010)	John Williamson in Symphony (2011)	The Big Red (2012)

John Williamson in Symphony is a live album by Australian country music artist John Williamson with the Sydney Symphony conducted by Guy Noble. The album was recorded at the Sydney Opera House in October 2010, two days after being inducted into the ARIA Hall of Fame. Directly after the concert, Mark Poston, Chairman of EMI Australia presented Williamson with a plaque showing all thirty-five of his EMI album covers from his forty year career. The plaque reads: "Presented to John Williamson in recognition of 40 Years 'True Blue'. This plaque is awarded in tribute to four decades of great stories and songs ... and making Australia a better place. With respect and best wishes from all your mates at EMI Australia."

The album was released in January 2011 and was certified platinum in 2013.

== Track listing ==
No.	Title	Writer(s)	Length
1.	"Islands of Oceans"		4:19
2.	"Wintergreen"	Williamson	2:51
3.	"Cootamundra Wattle"	Williamson	4:11
4.	"Hawkesbury River Lovin'"	Williamson	3:52
5.	"Salisbury Street"		3:34
6.	"Flower on the Water"		3:16
7.	"Boogie with M'Baby"	Williamson	8:01
8.	"Tubbo Station"		3:27
9.	"You and My Guitar"		3:02
10.	"A Bushman Can't Survive"		3:48
11.	"Galleries of Pink Galahs" (featuring Shannon)		4:11
12.	"Cape York Peninsula"		2:42
13.	"Look Out Cunnamulla"		3:02
14.	"The Prettiest Girl in the Kimberley"	Williamson	3:03
15.	"Chandelier of Stars"		3:22
16.	"Raining on the Rock"	Williamson	4:37
17.	"Waltzing Matilda"	Banjo Paterson	3:23
18.	"True Blue"	Williamson	4:23
19.	"Old Man Emu"	Williamson	3:51

The DVD includes bonus features including the presentation to Williamson of "40 Years 'True Blue'", interviews with industry and family members, and out-takes.

== Charts ==
Chart (2011)	Peak position
Australian DVD Chart	2

== Certifications ==
Region	Certification	Certified units/sales
Australia (ARIA)	Platinum	15,000^{^}
^{^} Shipments figures based on certification alone.

== Release history ==
Country	Date	Format	Label	Catalogue
Australia	28 January 2011	CD/DVD; DD	Shrinesong, Warner Music Australia	0944772
