= That Certain Thing (album) =

Studio album by Snowy White
- Released: 1987
- Genre: Pop rock
- Length: 52:17 (CD)
- Labels: Legend Records; Repertoire Records (CD)
- Producers: Snowy White, Kuma Harada

Snowy White chronology
Snowy White (1984)	That Certain Thing (1987)	Change My Life (1988)

That Certain Thing is the third album by guitarist Snowy White, released in 1987. It was the last album before White's change of direction towards blues music with the Snowy White Blues Agency. CD releases in 1997, 2002 and 2005 featured a different track list with two extra tracks.

The song "For You" had previously been released as a single in 1985 on R4 Records, with the non-album track "Straight On Ahead" on the B-side. "I'll Be Holding On" featured as an additional track on the 12-inch single. The song was a minor hit, reaching No. 65 in the UK. "For You" was released as a single again in 1987, this time on Legend Records, with "Sky High" on the B-side, again a non-album track.

Another single was issued by Legend Records in 1987, with two non-album tracks, "I Can't Let Go" / "Rush Hour". The 12-inch release also featured an instrumental version of "I Can't Let Go", and another track, "Changing Ways".

== Track listing ==
All tracks are written by Snowy White, except where noted.

Original UK LP
No.	Title	Writer(s)	Length
1.	"For You"		4:26
2.	"That Certain Thing"		6:18
3.	"Lonely Heart"		7:07
4.	"This Heart of Mine"	White, Kuma Harada	5:18
5.	"I Can't Believe It"	White, George Polehill	3:50
6.	"Walking Away"	White, Godfrey Wang	5:28
7.	"I'll Be Holding On"		5:45
8.	"Voices in the Rain"	White, Harada, Linda Taylor	4:57

The track "For You" is credited to White, Polehill on some releases.

CD Edition
No.	Title	Writer(s)	Length
1.	"That Certain Thing"		6:18
2.	"Lonely Heart"		7:07
3.	"This Heart of Mine"	White, Harada	5:18
4.	"I Can't Believe It"	White, Polehill	3:50
5.	"Walking Away"	White, Wang	5:28
6.	"I'll Be Holding On"		5:45
7.	"Voices in the Rain"	White, Harada, Taylor	4:57
8.	"Out of Reach"		4:39
9.	"For You"		4:26
10.	"Mai Tai"	Richard Bailey, Winston Delandro, Tony Maronie	4:29

== Personnel ==
- Snowy White – guitars, vocals
- Kuma Harada – bass guitar
- Godfrey Wang – keyboards
- Max Middleton – keyboards
- Steve Gregory – flute, saxophone
- Richard Bailey – drums, percussion
- Sonia Morgan – backing vocals
- Tessa Niles – backing vocals
- Linda Taylor – backing vocals
- Producers – Snowy White, Kuma Harada
