= Goodbye Blinky Bill =

1986 song by Joh Williamson

Single by John Williamson

from the album All the Best
- Released: March 1986
- Studio: Trafalgar Studios, Sydney Australia
- Label: GumLeaf Records, Festival Music
- Songwriter(s): John Williamson
- Producer(s): John Williamson

John Williamson singles chronology
"You and My Guitar" (1985)	"Goodbye Blinky Bill" (1986)	"True Blue" (1986)

"Goodbye Blinky Bill" is a song written and recorded by John Williamson with Bullamakanka and John’s daughters Ami and Georgie. The song was released in a limited edition in March 1986 as the only single from Williamson's 1986 compilation album All the Best.

The song is a conservation song, raising awareness of the decline in numbers of the Australian koala due to deforestation of eucalypts trees; with reference to an anthropomorphic koala named Blinky Bill. A$1 from each sale was donated to the Koala Preservation Society in Port Macquarie.

The song has been covered by The Wayfarers.

== Track listing ==
7"

Side A: "Goodbye Blinky Bill" (with Ami & Georgie Williamson and Bullamakanka)
Side B: "Koala Koala"

== Release history ==
Region	Date	Format	Edition(s)	Label	Catalogue
Australia	March 1986	7" Vinyl	Limited Edition	GumLeaf Records, Festival Records	K-9977
