= That's the Way It Goes =

That's the Way It Goes may refer to:

- "That's the Way It Goes" (George Harrison song), 1982
- "That's the Way It Goes" (Anne Murray song), 1997
- "That's The Way It Goes", a 1957 song by Eddie Fisher
- "That's The Way It Goes", a 1959 song by Wally Lewis
- "That's The Way It Goes", a 1961 song by Chubby Checker
- "That's The Way It Goes", a 1964 song by the Swinging Blue Jeans from the album Blue Jeans a'Swinging
- "That's The Way It Goes", a 1965 song by The Mojos
- "That's The Way It Goes", a 1981 song by Steve Marriott and Ronnie Lane from the album Majik Mijits
- "That's The Way It Goes", a 2000 song by the Eyeliners from the album Here Comes Trouble
