= Pipe Dream (John Williamson album) =

Studio album by John Williamson
- Released: August 1997
- Length: 51:00
- Label: Gumleaf Records, EMI Music
- Producer: John Williamson

John Williamson chronology
Country Classics (1997)	Pipe Dream (1997)	John Williamson for Aussie Kids (1998)

Singles from Pipe Dream
- 1. "Sir Don" Released: May 1996; 2. "Bush Telegraph" Released: July 1997

Pipe Dream is the thirteenth studio album by Australian country music artist John Williamson. The album was released in August 1997, peaked at number 6 on the ARIA Charts and was certified platinum.

At the Country Music Awards of Australia in January 1998, the album won 'Top Selling Album'.

== Track listing ==
No.	Title	Writer(s)	Length
1.	"On The Improve"	John Williamson	3:21
2.	"Wedding Ring"	Williamson	3:23
3.	"The Blues Sometimes"	Williamson	3:10
4.	"Coolabah Blue"	Williamson	3:21
5.	"Pipe Dream"	Williamson	2:57
6.	"Veggie Bill"	Williamson	3:37
7.	"Prettiest Girl in the Kimberley"	Williamson	3:47
8.	"The Girl I Met"	Williamson	3:15
9.	"Missin' the Kisses"	Williamson	3:12
10.	"Power Over Me"	Williamson	3:22
11.	"Woman on the Land"	Williamson	3:04
12.	"Bush Telegraph"	Williamson	2:57
13.	"Rosewood Hill"	Williamson	4:04
14.	"Old Pancho"	Williamson	2:57
15.	"Sir Don"	Williamson	3:11

Bonus Disc (Behind the Dream)
No.	Title	Writer(s)	Length
1.	"Behind the Dream"	John Williamson	30:37
2.	"Old Farts in a Caravan Park"	Williamson	4:05
3.	"All Good News"	Williamson	3:15
4.	"Raining on the Rock" (with Warren H. Williams)	Williamson	4:19

== Charts ==
=== Weekly charts ===
Chart (1997)	Peak position
Australian Albums (ARIA)	6

=== Year-end charts ===
Chart (1997)	Position
ARIA Albums Chart	58
ARIA Australian Artist Albums Chart	14

== Certifications ==
Region	Certification	Certified units/sales
Australia (ARIA)	Platinum	70,000^{^}
^{^} Shipments figures based on certification alone.

== Release history ==
Country	Date	Format	Label	Catalogue
Australia	August 1997	CD; Cassette	Gum Leaf, EMI Music	8590492
Australia	6 September 2013	CD; digital download	Warner Music Australia	5310583902
