= Number on My Back / The Baggy Green =

Single by John Williamson

from the album The Way It Is
- Released: December 1999
- Label: EMI Music
- Songwriter(s): John Williamson
- Producer(s): John Williamson

John Williamson singles chronology
"Purple Roses" (1999)	"Number on My Back / The Baggy Green" (1999)	"This Ancient Land" (2000)

"Number on My Back / The Baggy Green" is a double A-sided single recorded by Australian country singer John Williamson. The single was released in December 1999 as included as bonus tracks as the third and final single from Williamson's fourteenth studio album The Way It Is and peaked at number 95 on the ARIA Charts.

Williamson suggested to Rod Macqueen the coach of the Australia national rugby union team the song "Waltzing Matilda" may inspire the team; nicknamed "The Wallabies" against the All Blacks. The offer was accepted and on 28 August 1999, Williamson sang "Waltzing Matilda" at Stadium Australia, Sydney in front of a (then) world record rugby crowd of 107,042 people. After being inspired by the Wallabies Williamson wrote and recorded "A Number On My Back".

"The Baggy Green" was written with Gavin Robertson and Steve Waugh and features Waugh on vocals as well as the Boys of The Bankstown District Cricket Association.

== Track listing ==
No.	Title	Writer(s)	Length
1.	"Number on My Back"	Williamson	2:54
2.	"The Baggy Green" (featuring Steve Waugh and Boys of The Bankstown District Cricket Association)	Williamson, Gavin Robertson and Steve Waugh	3:36

== Charts ==
Chart performance for "Number on My Back" / "The Baggy Green"
Chart (1999)	Peak position
Australia (ARIA)	95

== Release history ==
Region	Date	Format	Edition(s)	Label	Catalogue
Australia	December 1999	Cassette; CD single	Standard	EMI Music	
