= Old Man Emu (EP) =

EP by John Williamson
- Released: January 1973
- Recorded: 1970–1972
- Studio: Bill Armstrong Studios; Melbourne, Australia
- Label: Fable Records
- Producer: June Productions of Australia Pty. Ltd.

John Williamson chronology
John Williamson (1970)	Old Man Emu (1973)	Travlin' Out West in Concert (1973)

Singles from Old Man Emu
- 1. "Misery Farm" Released: 1972; 2. "Big Country Round" Released: 1972

Old Man Emu is the debut extended play by Australian country music artist John Williamson. It was released in January 1973.

== Background and release ==
In 1970, Williamson entered New Faces, an Australian talent show, with the self-penned track "Old Man Emu". Williamson won the contest and signed with the newly formed label Fable Records. "Old Man Emu" was released in May 1970 which peaked at number 4 on the Kent Music Report and was certified gold in Australia. Williamson released his debut studio album in 1970 but failed to chart. He released four non-charting solo singles between 1970 and 1972.

== Track listing ==
Side A
No.	Title	Writer(s)	Length
1.	"Old Man Emu"	John Williamson	2:50
2.	"Big Country Round"	Williamson	2:36

Side B
No.	Title	Writer(s)	Length
1.	"Misery Farm"	Jay Wallis	2:08
2.	"Pitt Street Farmer"	Williamson	2:04

== Release history ==
Country	Date	Format	Label	Catalogue
Australia	January 1973	Vinyl Record	Fable Records	FBEP-160
