= The Way It Is...Live! =

The Way it Is...Live!

Video by Snowy White & the White Flames
- Released: 15 November 2005
- Recorded: August 2004
- Genre: Blues rock
- Length: 80:56
- Label: White Flames Records
- Producer: Snowy White

Professional ratings
Review scores
Source	Rating
AllMusic	

The Way It Is...Live! is a concert film by Snowy White and his band The White Flames, recorded during a 2004 tour, and released in 2005. It features a promotional video of Peter Green's "Black Magic Woman". Originally edited as a DVD, a bonus audio CD includes the complete concert.

== Track listing ==
All songs by Snowy White, except where noted.

1. "No Stranger to the Blues" (Snowy White, Gil Marais-Gilchrist) – 3:57
2. "What I'm Searching For" – 6:24
3. "Little Wing" (Jimi Hendrix) – 5:24
4. "Blues Is the Road" – 4:44
5. "I Loved Another Woman" (Peter Green) – 4:47
6. "The Answer" – 2:56
7. "Land of Plenty" – 6:42
8. "Lucky Star" – 5:19
9. "Terpisah" (Walter Latupeirissa) – 7:35
10. "Working Blues" – 6:14
11. "Angel Inside You, Part I & II" – 12:28
12. "This Time of My Life" – 3:41
13. "A Piece of Your Love" – 4:12
14. "Black Magic Woman" (Green)

== Personnel ==
- Snowy White – guitars, vocals.
- Walter Latupeirissa – bass guitar, vocals.
- Max Middleton – Hammond organ, keyboards, piano, vocals.
- Richard Bailey – drums, percussion.
