= 2YOU =

88.9 FM New England North West, 99.5 FM Liverpool Plains (2YOU)
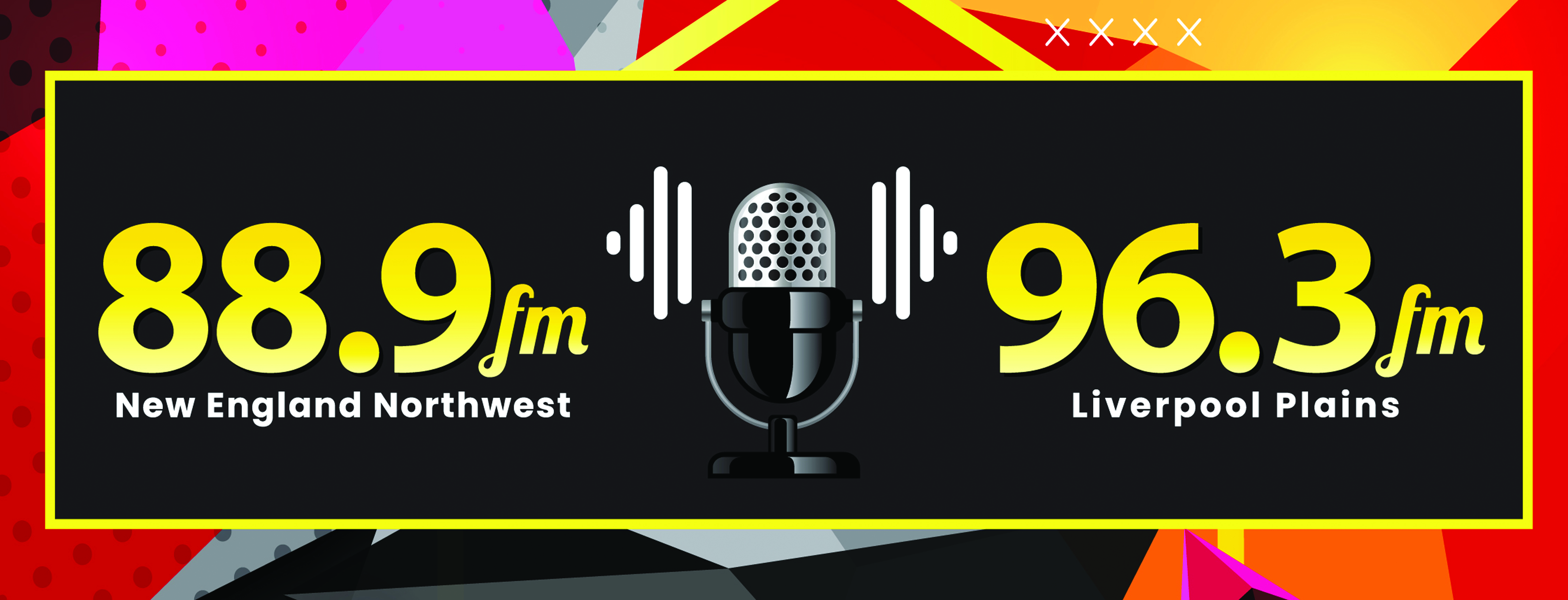
- Tamworth, Australia; Australia
- Frequency: 88.9 MHz FM

Programming
- Language: English
- Format: Classic Hits

Ownership
- Owner: Tamworth Broadcast Services Pty Ltd

History
- First air date: 16 July 1983
- Former frequencies: 95.5 MHz FM (1983–1999)

Technical information
- Class: Community radio
- Repeater: 99.5 MHz FM Quirindi

Links
- Webcast: Listen Live on iHeart Radio
- Website: 889fmtamworth.com.au

88.9 FM (call sign 2YOU) is a community radio station broadcasting from Tamworth, Australia and is available online via iHeartRadio. 88.9/99.5fm Services North West NSW, Liverpool Plains and New England.

88.9 FM was the first FM station in Tamworth and has been broadcasting since 1983 across parts of the New England and Northwest. 88.9 FM is a member of the Community Broadcasting Association of Australia (CBAA) and aims to be a local voice for the Tamworth, New England/Northwest/Liverpool Plains area, offering regional news, outside broadcasts, local information, community announcements, coverage of major events and broadcasting essential emergency information.

The station's main frequency is 88.9 MHz on the FM band, with a repeater 99.5 MHz in the Liverpool Plains area covering Quirindi and Werris Creek.

== History ==
2YOU FM started in small studios on Marius Street Tamworth. The walls of the studio were lined with egg cartons for sound insulation. It had two B&W turntable, a cassette player, a six-slider panel and a microphone. The studio moved twice, to Peel Street in 1984 and then to the National Trust Railway Building on Darling Street, East Tamworth.

== Change to 88.9 FM ==
In May 2014, the Board approved several changes and appointed a new CEO and the call sign 2YOU was dropped and the stations name was changed to its frequency 88.9 FM, which allowed listeners to remember the station. With the new image, included new presenters, a contracted national voice-over production company and to complement a strong music format.

Logo used from 2014 to 2020

The previous format was changed from numerous music genres and "ad hoc programs" that had poor listening audience into a format of '70s, '80s, '90s and the best in country. Regular shifts across the board were implemented, new image jingles, regional news from 88.9 FM Newsroom plus Macquarie National News cross promotion with Prime 7 Television.

The station broadcasts from its own building and tower from Bald Hill at 956-meter's which is 5 kilometres east of Tamworth in its broadcast coverage, including Tamworth City, Tamworth Regional, [, New South Wales, Manilla, Quirindi and various towns in New England and The Northwest of New South Wales.

In September 2019 after further research the station introduced a new theme "We've Got the Music" with new jingles to build on their 45 to 65 year old market. The station imaging is also on Regional/City Buses and posters in local shopping centres to promote the new image of the station.

In June 2020, Tamworth Broadcasting Society serving the Liverpool Plains area as part of their licence on 96.3FM, therefore with 88.9FM the station now covers the New England/ Northwest and Liverpool Plains of New South Wales. In 2021 the station commenced both Streaming and iHeart Nationally and Internationally and in 2024, the repeater frequency for the Liverpool Plains was moved to 99.5FM

== Programming ==
There is a mixed listening format all day with songs from the '60s, '70s, '80s, ‘90s and the best in country. 88.9 FM operates Locally from Tamworth 24/7. Including, Breakfast, Morning, Afternoon, Drive, Nights and Weekends.

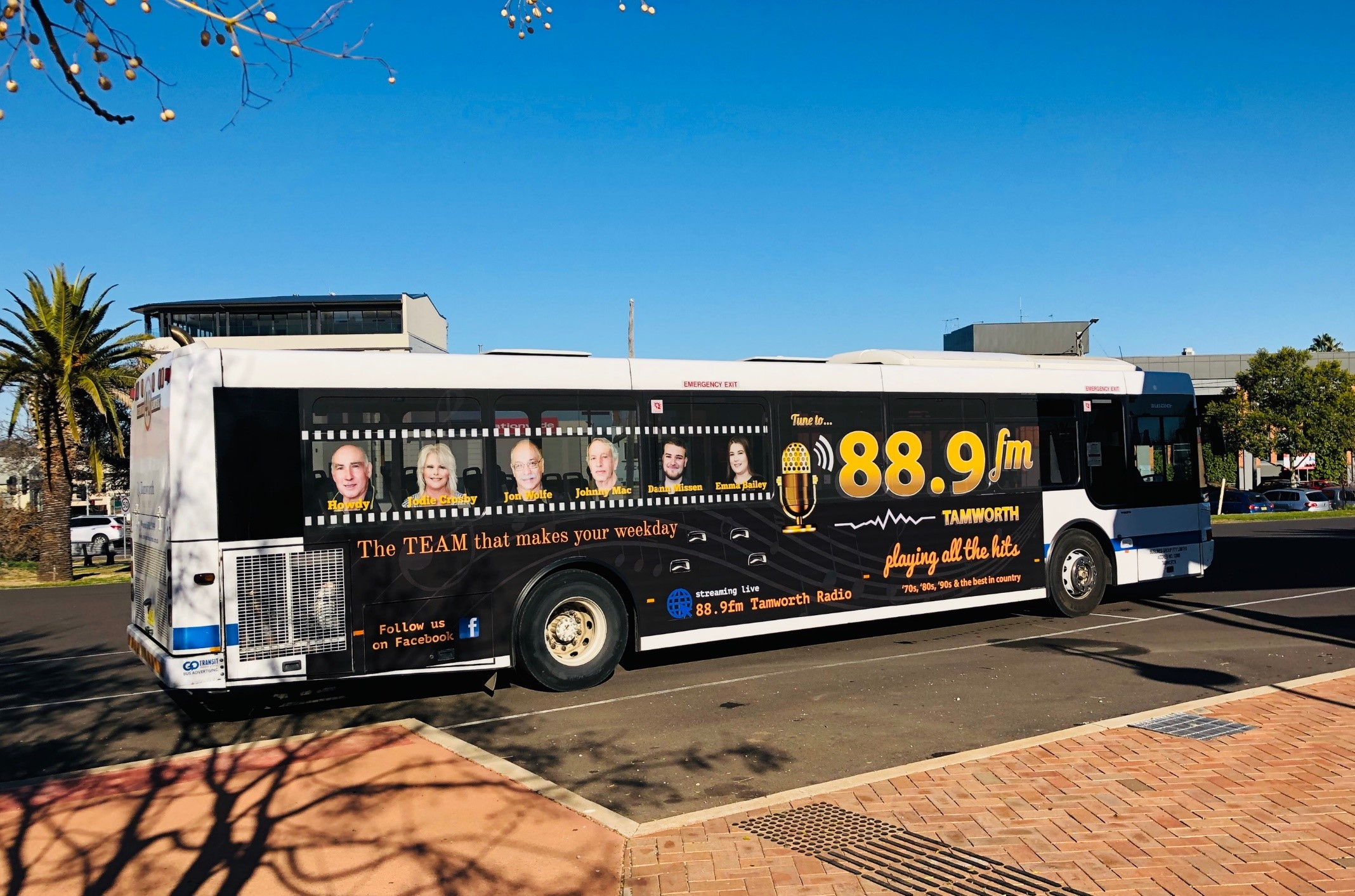
88.9FM advertisement on city buses in Tamworth

Segments on 88.9FM include:

Weekdays

- Howdy 5 am to 9 am Mon/Fri
- MacCa in the mornings 9 am to noon Mon/Fri
- Adam Parker "Grizzly" 12 noon to 3 pm Mon/Fri
- Ray McCoy 3 pm to 7 pm Mon/Fri

Weekends

- Johnny Mac Sat/Sun 6 am to 9 am
- George Frame Sat/Sun 9 am to 12noon
- Richard Manning Sunday 12 pm - 2 pm
- Ian Cousins Sat 6 pm - 8 pm
- Emma Bailey Sat 8 pm to 12 midnight
- Brett Larkham Sunday 6 pm to 8 pm
- Howdy & Dan Hoedown Sunday 8 pm to 10 pm
- The Late Show Sunday 10 pm - 12 midnight

Nine News hourly 7 days

Overnight 7 Days

- hit format 12 midnight to 5:00 am

== Income ==
The station earns income mainly from sponsors, outside broadcasts and membership. Sponsorship takes the form of payment for on-air promotions of local business from a set Rate Card. 88.9 FM sales offers broadcast and social media packages.

88.9 FM has a full-time staff of 15, including administration, production, news, engineering, sales/marketing team.

== Technical data ==
- Frequency – 88.9 FM Tamworth
- Broadcasts Site – Bald Hill, 938 Metres high, 5 kilometres East of Tamworth City
- Multiplexed ZPG high gain antenna array
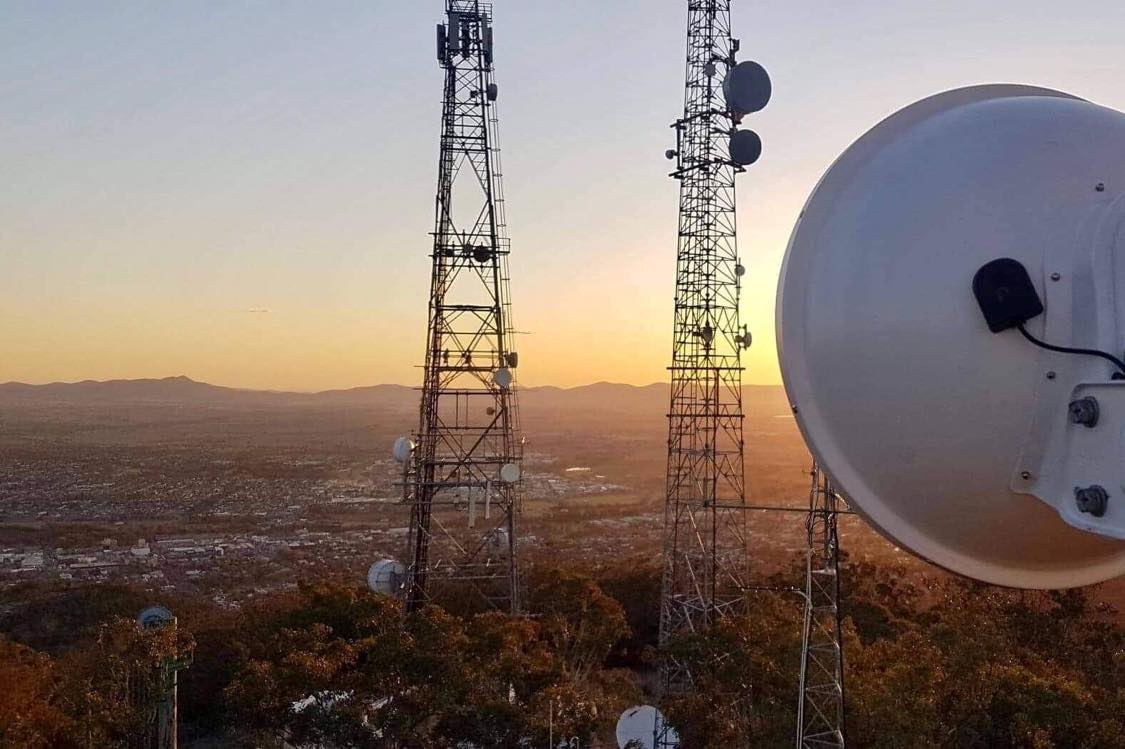
  Photo taken from 88.9FM's transmitter site at Bald Hill
- Transmitter 1 – 2016 BWFM transmitter
- Transmitter 2 – 2015 BWFM transmitter
- Full emergency backup power
- FM RDS

Liverpool Plains Repeater

- Frequency – 99.5 FM Quirindi
- Broadcast Site – Who‘d-A-Thought-It Lookout, 508 Metres high, 5 kilometres west of Quirindi
- Transmitter 1 – 2020 BWFM transmitter

Studios

- Automation System – Studio's A, C, D Newsroom all interfaced through automation; "Maximation 7"
- Production studios: Adobe
- Desk: Elan 'Kestral 12' Studio in A, Studio B custom Auditron news/producers desk, Studio C and D – Elan "Merlin" both set up with full digital editing facilities.
