= Bird of Paradise (Snowy White song) =

- UK single cover

Single by Snowy White

from the album White Flames
- B-side: "The Answer"
- Released: December 1983
- Genre: Soft rock
- Length: 4:21
- Label: Towerbell Records
- Songwriter: Snowy White
- Producer: Kuma Harada

Picture disc
- UK picture disc

"Bird of Paradise" is the debut single by former Thin Lizzy guitarist Snowy White, from his debut album, White Flames, released in 1983. The single became White's biggest hit, peaking at no. 6 on the UK Singles Chart in January 1984, remaining on the chart for 11 weeks. The song was the only single released from the album, and is White's signature song.

The song has featured on various compilations of White's material, such as Goldtop: Groups & Sessions '74–'94, Pure Gold and The Best of Snowy White. White performed the song on the BBC Television show Top of the Pops in 1984.

British radio DJ Steve Wright described "Bird of Paradise" as "one of my favourite songs of all time", after playing the song on BBC Radio 1 during its run in the charts.

== Personnel ==
- Snowy White – guitars, vocals
- Kuma Harada – bass guitar
- Godfrey Wang – string synthesizer
- Richard Bailey – drums, percussion

== Charts ==
=== Weekly charts ===
Chart (1983-84)	Peak position
Australian Singles (Kent Music Report)	32
Belgium (Ultratop 50 Flanders)	8
Netherlands (Dutch Top 40)	6
Netherlands (Single Top 100)	7
South African Top 20	13
UK Singles (OCC)	6

=== Year-end charts ===
Chart (1984)	Peak position
Belgium (Ultratop 50 Flanders)	87
Netherlands (Dutch Top 40)	62
Netherlands (Single Top 100)	65

== Certifications ==
Region	Certification	Certified units/sales
United Kingdom (BPI)	Silver	250,000^{^}
^{^} Shipments figures based on certification alone.
