= The Way It Is (John Williamson album) =

Studio album by John Williamson
- Released: July 1999
- Studio: ENREC Studios, Tamworth, New South Wales
- Length: 55:52
- Label: Gumleaf Records, EMI Music
- Producer: John Williamson

John Williamson chronology
Laugh Along with John Williamson (1999)	The Way It Is (1999)	Australia (1999)

Singles from The Way It Is
- 1. "A Thousand Feet" Released: 1999; 2. "Purple Roses" Released: 1999; 3. "Number on My Back / The Baggy Green" Released: December 1999

The Way It Is is the fourteenth studio album by Australian country music artist John Williamson. The album was released in July 1999, peaked at number 10 on the ARIA Charts and was certified platinum.

At the Country Music Awards of Australia in January 200, the album won 'Top Selling Album'. "Campfire on the Road" won Heritage Song of the Year and "Three Sons" won Bush Ballad of the Year.

At the ARIA Music Awards of 2000, the album was nominated for Best Country Album.

== Track listing ==
No.	Title	Writer(s)	Length
1.	"Campfire on the Road"	John Williamson	3:35
2.	"A Thousand Feet" (featuring Warren H. Williams)	Williamson	2:50
3.	"Three Sons"	Williamson	3:33
4.	"Queensland Bungalow"	Williamson	3:38
5.	"Wonthaggi"	Williamson	4:06
6.	"Mountain Highway"	Williamson	3:34
7.	"Singing in the Rain"	Williamson	2:58
8.	"Would I Be the One"	Williamson	3:13
9.	"We're Still Here"	Williamson	3:25
10.	"Happy Birthday My Old Friend"	Williamson	2:59
11.	"Railwaymen"	Williamson	5:17
12.	"Great Ocean Road"	Williamson	3:23
13.	"Purple Roses"	Williamson	3:13
14.	"Do I Love You?"	Williamson	3:25
15.	"Thargomindah (The Way It Is)"	Williamson	3:33
16.	"The Land Of The Truly Free"	Williamson	3:11

Bonus Tracks
No.	Title	Writer(s)	Length
17.	"The Baggy Green" (with Steve Waugh and Boys of The Bankstown District Cricket Association)	Williamson, Steve Waugh, Gavin Robertson	2:53
18.	"A Number On My Back" (featuring The Rugby Club Choir, Rugby Club Sydney)		3:43

== Charts ==
=== Weekly charts ===
Chart (1999)	Peak position
Australian Albums (ARIA)	10

=== Year-end charts ===
Chart (1999)	Position
Australian Albums (ARIA)	86

== Certifications ==
Region	Certification	Certified units/sales
Australia (ARIA)	Platinum	70,000^{^}
^{^} Shipments figures based on certification alone.

== Release history ==
Country	Date	Format	Label	Catalogue
Australia	July 1999	CD; Cassette	Gum Leaf, EMI Music	5215152
