= Snowy White =

English guitarist

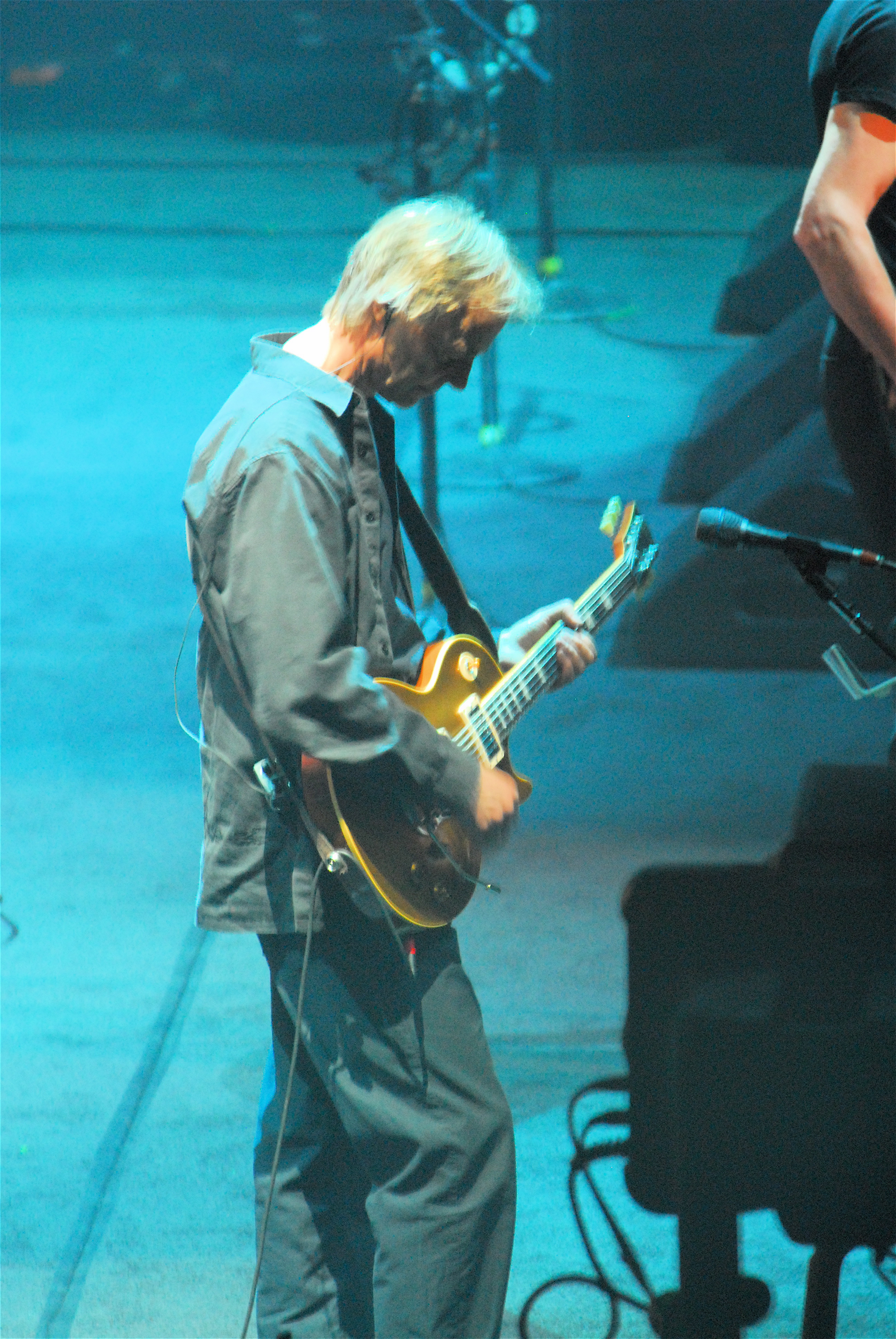
- White performing with Roger Waters in 2007

Background information
- Born: Terence Charles White; 3 March 1948 (age 78); Barnstaple, Devon, England
- Genres: Blues rock; hard rock; pop rock; progressive rock
- Occupations: Musician; singer-songwriter
- Instruments: Guitar; vocals
- Years active: 1965–present
- Labels: Towerbell; White Flames; Repertoire; Hypertension; Cleopatra
- Formerly of: Thin Lizzy, Pink Floyd, Roger Waters & The Bleeding Heart Band, Snowy White's Blues Agency, Snowy White & The White Flames, Snowy White Blues Project
- Website: snowywhite.com

Terence Charles "Snowy" White (born 3 March 1948) is an English guitarist, known for having played with Thin Lizzy (permanent member from 1980 to 1982) and with Pink Floyd (as a backing guitarist from 1977 to 1980), and later for Roger Waters' band. He is also known for his 1983 single "Bird of Paradise", which became a UK Singles Chart Top 10 hit single.

== Early life ==
Terence Charles White was born on 3 March 1948 in Devon, England. He grew up on the Isle of Wight and was self-taught as a guitarist, having received his first guitar from his parents at the age of ten. He moved to Stockholm in 1965 at the age of seventeen, spending more than a year there playing in a trio called the Train. In 1968, he purchased his signature guitar, a Gibson Les Paul Goldtop.

== Career ==
White made his way to London by 1970 and found work as a session player and as a member of Heavy Heart. During this time, he met Peter Green, and the two began a lifelong friendship (he later appeared on Green's album In the Skies).

In 1977, White was recommended to Pink Floyd by EMI's Head of Promotions Hilary Walker, as they were looking for an additional guitarist for the live band on the In the Flesh tour to promote the Animals album. White's solo on "Pigs on the Wing" (8-track version only), was his first time playing for the band. During the tour, White started off the show by playing bass guitar on the song "Sheep", as well as soloing during "Have a Cigar" and "Shine on You Crazy Diamond Part VIII". Following the tour, which ended in July 1977, White played guitar on Pink Floyd keyboardist Richard Wright's debut solo album Wet Dream, recorded in January–February 1978 and released in September 1978.

In 1979 Thin Lizzy guitarist Scott Gorham, having seen White play with Pink Floyd in New York City during the Animals tour, approached him about joining Thin Lizzy.

The collaboration with these two bands was very complicated; the invitation to rehearse the live show of The Wall for Pink Floyd, happened at the same time he was invited to become a full-time member of Thin Lizzy, with whom he recorded/co-wrote their Chinatown and Renegade albums. White left Thin Lizzy in August 1982.

White's connection to Pink Floyd continued in later decades. White was invited by former Pink Floyd bassist Roger Waters to perform at The Wall Concert in Berlin in 1990, by the ruins of the Berlin Wall, along with other artists. Waters also called on White in 1991 for the "Guitar Legends" concert, in Seville. David Gilmour was the guest on White's 1994 album Highway to the Sun, appearing on the track "Love, Pain and Sorrow", with Gilmour playing his DigiTech Whammy pedal-enhanced Fender Stratocaster, which was recorded at Gilmour's houseboat studio, The Astoria.

Apart from guest appearances by Chris Rea, David Gilmour and Gary Moore, the album also introduced two new Dutch-Indonesian musicians, Juan van Emmerloot (drums) and Walter Latupeirissa (bass and rhythm guitar). Kuma Harada also played bass and rhythm guitar.

White's next album project was entitled Goldtop, named after his Gibson Les Paul Goldtop Standard guitar. It featured material in which White has been involved from 1974 until 1994, including two tracks from Thin Lizzy, jams from the Peter Green In the Skies session, and the extended, 8-track tape version of the Pink Floyd song "Pigs on the Wing", featuring White's guitar bridge between the two parts.

White has recorded five albums with his White Flames band. The first three were No Faith Required in 1996, Little Wing in 1998 and Keep Out: We Are Toxic in 1999.

In 1999 White joined Waters for his band's In the Flesh US tour and in 2000, Waters again toured the US, this time recording a live album and making a film of the show. Again, from February to July 2002 White toured the world with Roger Waters.

Another White Flames album (as a three-piece), entitled Restless, was released in May 2002. Spring 2005 saw the release of a new White Flames album, titled The Way It Is, with a basic four-piece outfit consisting of Richard Bailey (drums/percussion), Walter Latupeirissa (bass) and Max Middleton (keyboards). A DVD, The Way It Is...Live!, was completed and issued.

White toured with Waters in The Dark Side of the Moon Live tour from June 2006, having played in Europe, North America, Australia, Asia and South America. He also performed with Waters at Live Earth.

White formed a new band in 2008 named the Snowy White Blues Project. In Our Time of Living was released in April 2009. The group featured Matt Taylor: guitar/vocals, Ruud Weber: bass/vocals, Juan van Emmerloot: drums, and Snowy White: guitar/vocals.

In 2010 White toured again with Roger Waters, in The Wall Live.

In 2016, White's "Midnight Blues" was sampled on rapper Meek Mill's track "Blue Notes".

Due to health issues, he announced his retirement from playing live in 2019. White continues to record and release albums to this day.

== Discography ==
- 1983 – White Flames
- 1984 – Snowy White
- 1987 – That Certain Thing
- 1988 – Change My Life (as Snowy White's Blues Agency)
- 1989 – Open for Business (as Snowy White's Blues Agency)
- 1994 – Highway to the Sun
- 1995 – Arthur's Club-Geneve 1995 (with Mick Taylor)
- 1996 – No Faith Required (as Snowy White & The White Flames)
- 1998 – Little Wing (as Snowy White & The White Flames) (re-released as Melting in 1999)
- 1999 – Keep Out – We Are Toxic (as Snowy White & The White Flames)
- 2002 – Restless (as Snowy White & The White Flames)
- 2005 – The Way It Is (as Snowy White & The White Flames)
- 2007 – Live Flames (as Snowy White & The White Flames)
- 2009 – In Our Time of Living (as Snowy White Blues Project)
- 2010 – In Our Time... Live (as Snowy White Blues Project)
- 2011 – Realistic (as Snowy White & The White Flames)
- 2012 – After Paradise
- 2016 – Released
- 2017 – Reunited... (as Snowy White & The White Flames)
- 2019 – The Situation (as Snowy White & The White Flames)
- 2020 – Something On Me (as Snowy White & The White Flames)
- 2022 – Driving On The 44
- 2024 – Unfinished Business
- 2026 – The Finishing Touch (as Snowy White & The White Flames)

=== Compilations ===
- 1993: Snowy White's Blues Agency – The Best of Snowy White's Blues Agency
- 1996: Snowy White – Goldtop: Groups & Sessions '74–'94
- 1998: Snowy White's Blues Agency – The Masters (compilation of 'Change My Life and 'Open For Business')
- 1999: Snowy White – Pure Gold – The Solo Years 1983–98 (compilation)
- 2003: Snowy White – Bird of Paradise – An Anthology (compilation, Double CD)
- 2009: Snowy White's Blues Agency – Twice as Addictive
- 2009: Snowy White – The Best of Snowy White (double CD, compilation)

=== Thin Lizzy ===
- 1980: Chinatown
- 1981: Renegade
- 1983: Life (3 tracks)

=== Pink Floyd ===
- 1977: Animals (bridging piece on 8-track cartridge only)
- 2000: Is There Anybody Out There? The Wall Live 1980-81

==== Rick Wright ====
- 1978: Wet Dream

==== Roger Waters ====
- 1990: The Wall Live in Berlin
- 2000: In the Flesh: Live
- 2002: Flickering Flame: The Solo Years Vol. 1
- 2015: Roger Waters: The Wall

=== Other recordings featuring Snowy White ===
- 1974: ...Waiting on You by Jonathan Kelly's Outside
- 1975: New Worlds Fair by Michael Moorcock and The Deep Fix, United Artists
- 1979: In the Skies by Peter Green
- 1980: Solo in Soho by Philip Lynott
- 1984: One Man Mission by Jim Capaldi
- 1993: Rio Grande by Eddy Mitchell (Polydor); solo guitar on "je me sens mieux quand je me sens mal" and "te perdre"
- 1997: Snow Blind by Tom Newman and Friends (Snowy White on two tracks, recorded 1983)
- 1997: Looking for Somebody Rattlesnake Guitar: The Music of Peter Green
- 2017: Blue Notes by Meek Mill

=== DVDs ===
- 2012: Snowy White and Friends – After Paradise [г., Blues Rock, DVD9]
- 2005: Live from London
- 2005: The Way It Is...Live!
- 2005: Instropective
- 2004: Thin Lizzy at Rockpalast
