= Alan Thomson (musician) =

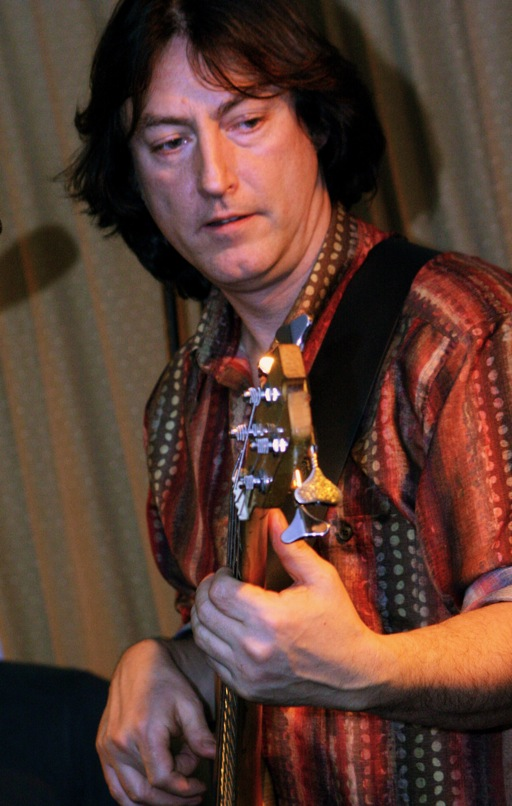
- Thompson playing live

Background information
- Born: 3 May 1960 (age 66); Glasgow, Scotland
- Genres: Rock, folk, jazz
- Occupation: Musician
- Instruments: Bass guitar, fretless bass guitar, guitar, keyboards, ebony oboe mandolin
- Website: alanthomsonbass.com

Alan Thomson (born 3 May 1960) is a Scottish bassist and vocalist with many acts, including the late John Martyn.

== Biography ==
Starting out playing guitar for the Arthur Trout Band (1976–1980), he then switched to fretless bass guitar and was invited to work with John Martyn, Alan toured and recorded with John until Martyn's death in 2009. Thomson played keyboards with the Scottish band Strangeways (1984–1986). Other collaborations in the 1980s included touring with Black Sabbath's Geezer Butler and recording with The Mighty Wah.

While working with Yahama, a meeting with Jerry Donahue led to Thomson joining the Backroom Boys along with Doug Morter and a subsequent invite to join the Hellecasters in 1987, and then to touring with John Jorgenson's Electric Band (1997 – present). In 1998, an offshoot from the Backroom Boys started Then Came the Wheel.

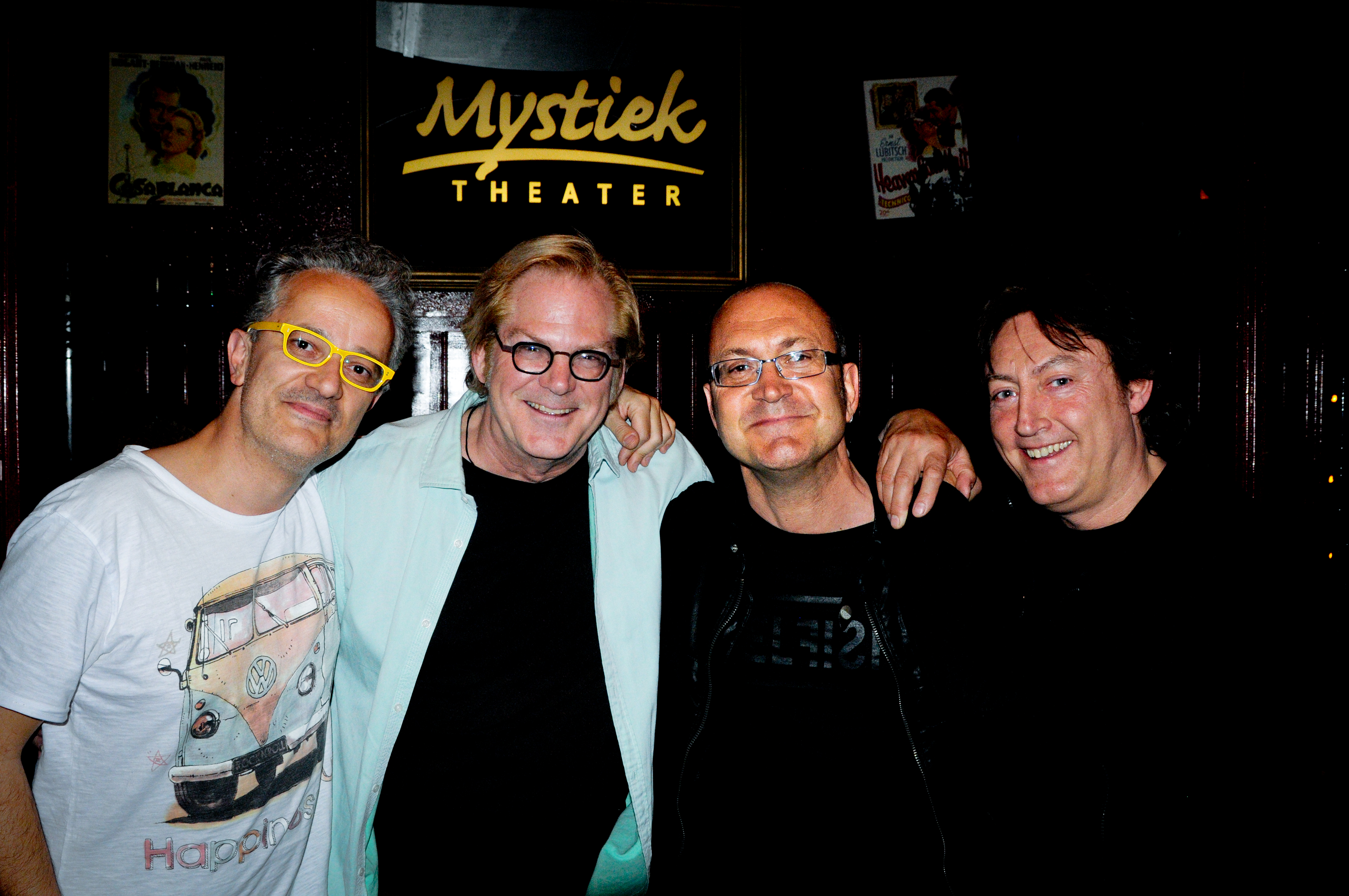
John Jorgenson Electric Band 2015 (Thomson first on the right)

He has toured with Canadian guitarist Amos Garrett, backed American guitarist Brent Mason, plus Hank Marvin and made several tours of Europe with Long John Baldry. He has recorded with Dick Gaughan, Sally Barker, Maggie Reilly, Nigel H Seymour, Shonu Das, and Frank O'Hagan.

Thomson has also worked with Denny Laine (2008–2009), toured and recorded with Rick Wakeman in both duo and band formats from 1989 to 2004, recorded and toured with Julia Fordham, Carol Decker, and guitarist Andy Summers, and has songwriting credits with Robert Palmer, John Martyn, Sally Barker, Rev Doc and The Congregation, The Backroom Boys and Then Came the Wheel.

He tours and records with Jacqui McShee's Pentangle (since 1997), John Jorgenson's Electric Band, Rev Doc and The Congregation, Then Came The Wheel, and with Martin Barre.
