= One World (John Martyn album) =

Studio album by John Martyn
- Released: 4 November 1977
- Recorded: 16 July–September 1977
- Studios: Woolwich Green Farm, Theale, Berkshire, England
- Genres: Experimental pop; dub; blues; jazz-funk; rock; ambient
- Length: 38:38
- Label: Island
- Producer: Chris Blackwell

John Martyn chronology
Sunday's Child (1975)	One World (1977)	Grace and Danger (1980)

Singles from One World
- 1. "Dancing" Released: February 1978

One World is the seventh studio album by the British guitarist and singer John Martyn, released in November 1977 by Island Records. The album, produced by Island owner Chris Blackwell at his Berkshire farm, was recorded with myriad musicians, including Steve Winwood, Danny Thompson, John Stevens, Hansford Rowe and Rico. The album followed a sabbatical where, at Blackwell's invite, Martyn holidayed in Jamaica in 1976 with his family, having become disillusioned with the music business. The trip helped revitalise his interest in music.

The album combines Martyn's experimental tendencies with more pop-leaning material, with influences from the dub music of Lee "Scratch" Perry, with whom Martyn worked during the trip to Jamaica and co-wrote the song "Big Muff". The record features a relaxing, echoing sound with usage of Martyn's distinctive Echoplex guitar effects, while his lyrics discuss love, specific people and his disintegrating marriage. Some of the recording was achieved outdoors, with Island's mobile recording studio being used to operate a live feed across the farm's surrounding lake; microphones picked up the full ambience of the area, including natural reverb and surrounding geese and trains, helping contribute to the album's sweeping sound.

Upon its release, One World received acclaim from music critics who hailed its inventive, unique sound and lyrics. Martyn toured in promotion of the album in late 1977, whilst a televised performance at the Collegiate Theatre, London in January 1978 helped the album become Martyn's first chart success, reaching number 54 on the UK Albums Chart. "Dancing" was released as the album's sole single a month later. In later times, the album has been credited for helping develop trip hop music. In 2004, a deluxe edition of the album was released by Island, containing bonus live material. The album is included in the music reference book 1001 Albums You Must Hear Before You Die.

== Background ==
John Martyn's sixth album Sunday's Child (1975) was more conventionally song-oriented than his previous works, particularly its more adventurous direct predecessor Inside Out (1973). He spent 1975 touring to an excessive schedule, but by the end of the year had become disillusioned with the music industry, particularly session musicians who he believed prioritised finance over creativity in their decisions, deceitful managers and agencies, and threatened to end his career. He felt he needed to tour excessively to help aid his wife Beverley Martyn and their children. A live album from the tour, Live at Leeds (1976), was released through mail order from the Martyns' home and sold successfully, but Martyn's bad moods, drinking problems and poor relationship with his wife continued, later worsening when Paul Kossoff, the guitarist on tour with Martyn in 1975, died. His death, combined with the earlier death of Nick Drake, caused Martyn to lose two of his closest friends in close succession, and expanded the musician's weariness of the music industry.

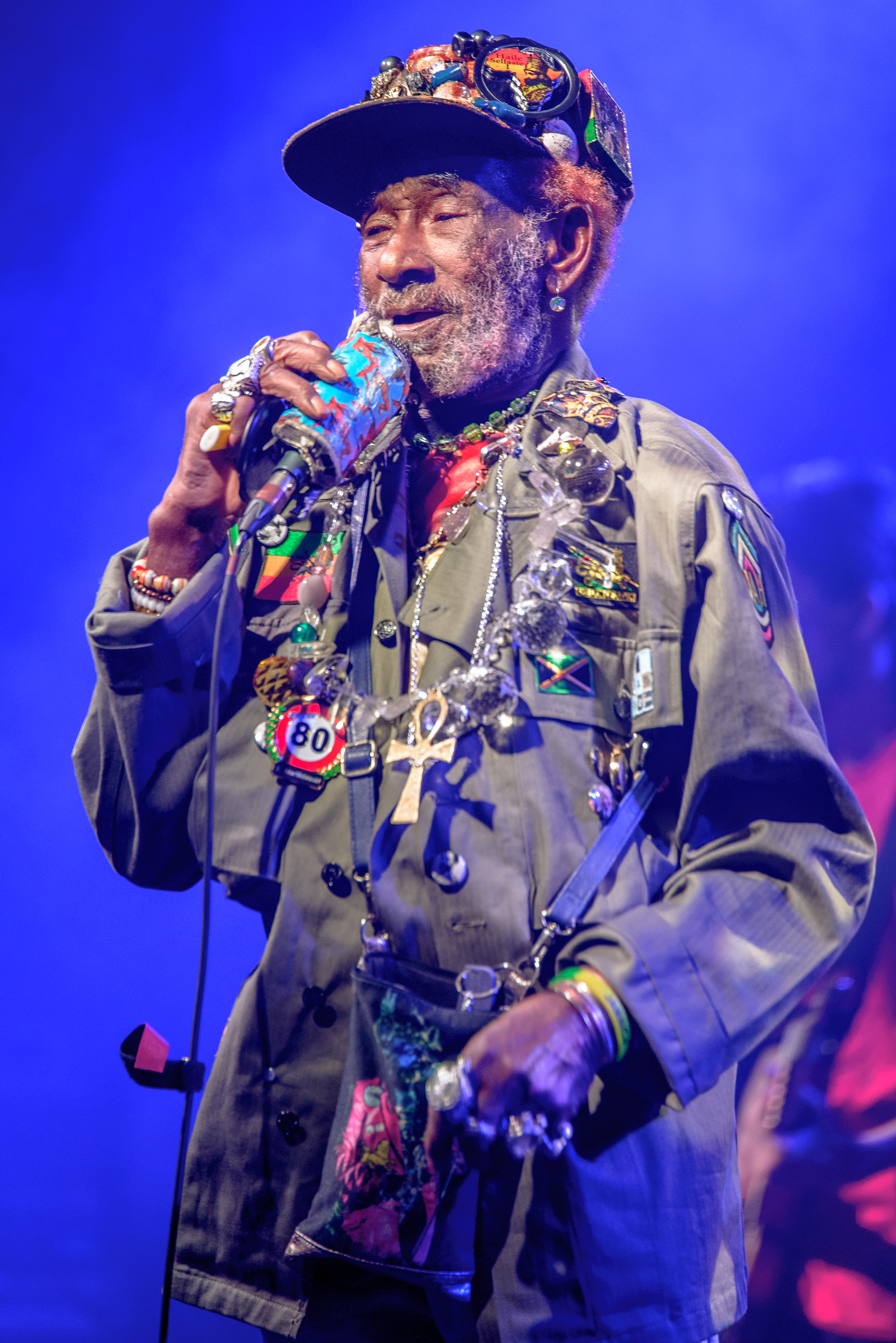
Dub producer Lee "Scratch" Perry (pictured 2016) in Jamaica, whom Martyn co-wrote "Big Muff" with, influenced the album's sound.

Tired of his incessant "tour-record-tour-record" cycle, Martyn spent his savings on a year-long sabbatical where he could reassess his career. As part of this break, Chris Blackwell, founder of Martyn's label Island Records, invited the musician and his family to his home in Jamaica, a trip during which Martyn's enthusiasm for music was generally regained. The length of his trip is unknown; Martyn later said "I may have been there for seven weeks; it may have been seven months. I stayed rather longer than my visa extended." The trip has been seen as a busman's holiday, as the artist socialised with reggae musicians Burning Spear, Max Romeo and Lee "Scratch" Perry, the latter of whom co-wrote the One World song "Big Muff" with Martyn. Blackwell introduced Martyn to Perry at the latter's Black Ark Studios due to the musicians' similar recording techniques involving echo. Martyn said: "I was using rhythm boxes and Echoplex, and my man Scratch was into the same effect, a dub thing, man. It was the echo thing that invented dub for Scratch – and I just came across my version of it by accident." While at the studios, he appeared on Spear's Man in the Hills (1976), and recorded a cover of "Johnny Too Bad" by reggae band the Slickers from The Harder They Come soundtrack (1972).

After returning home from Jamaica, Martyn began recording demos of the songs on One World at his home near Hastings, having set up a "little thing in the conservatory", which included black curtains for sound insulation and two rhythm boxes. Martyn's song structures became tighter in this era, a result of him becoming disillusioned with the attitudes of jazz musicians, who he found more competitive than folk singers. He later said: "I found them even more hustly, and even more petty. And I've never been one for coteries; I don't like scenes. Fuck the scene — there ain't no 'scene' — the whole thing's a scene." The new compositions downplayed acoustic guitar and instead focused on rock, world and jazz fusion. He began performing live again in 1976, with gigs including a solo benefit performance in Nottingham, and in early 1977 Island released the compilation So Far So Good – dedicated to Martyn's first decade as an Island artist – which was later certified Gold, although it did not chart. Despite Martyn's general low sales, Blackwell did not lose faith in him, having started to view him as "more of a jazz artist", and offered to produce One World, a comeback record for the singer. Music writers have described One World as the result of Martyn's sabbatical.

== Recording ==
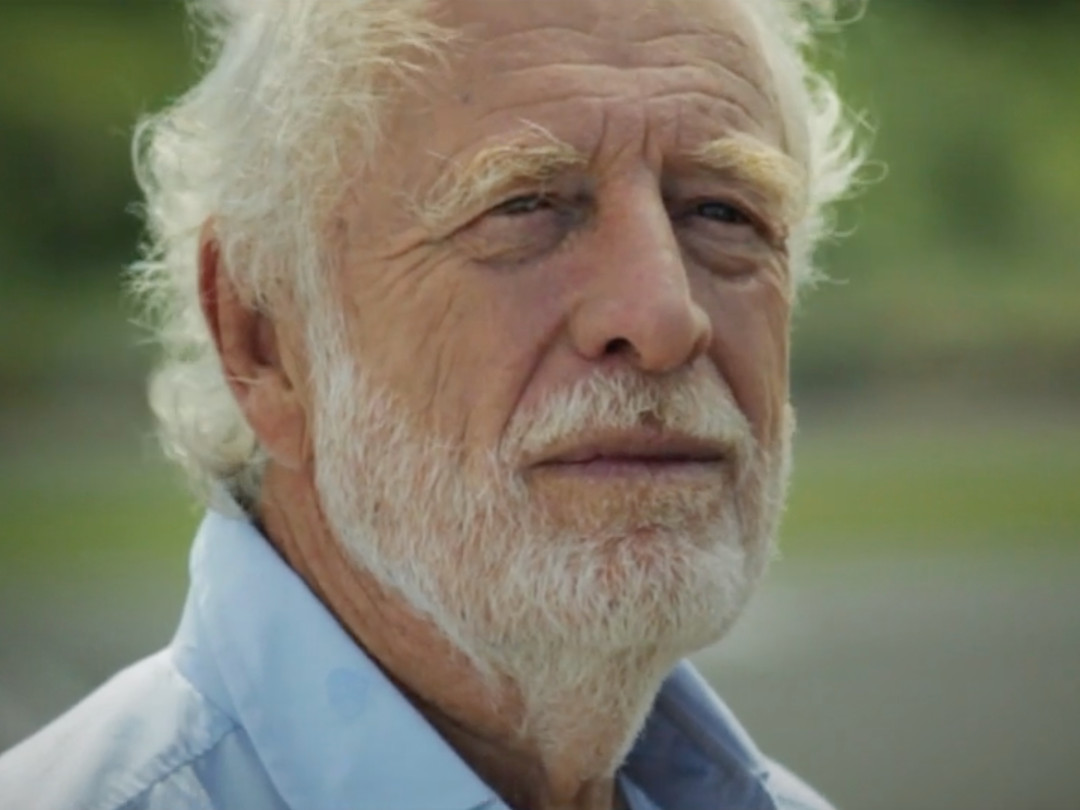
Chris Blackwell produced One World at his Woolwich Green Farm in Theale, Berkshire.

One World was recorded during July–September 1977 at Blackwell's Woolwich Green Farm in Theale, Berkshire. According to Martyn, the location was chosen because Blackwell did not want to travel to and from London on a daily basis to record the album. The musician said of the farm: "Vast grounds, lovely lake, a fine environment. It was my way of saying, it's not all rock'n'roll and mirrors". While at the farm, Martyn and engineer Phill Brown resided in two converted stables. Although Martyn had said he brought his wife and children to the cottage, he also claimed that Beverley did not attend the sessions and felt she may have erroneously thought he was living a hedonistic lifestyle at the farm. Martyn trusted Blackwell, a personal friend of his, with choosing which songs he should record for the album, later explaining: "he has what I call 'cross-over ears,' he'd as soon listen to Coltrane as anyone else. He knows what people will dig, right, which is something I've lost sight of. I don't honestly know what's strongest of my material."

Island Records' mobile recording unit was operated in a courtyard over half a mile away from the main farmhouse. Brown recalled that a typical day's recording would begin at 2pm, occasionally working through to 4 or 5am. At Blackwell's recommendation, microphones were used to record the lapping sounds of the lake and the resident geese, with speakers shipped out onto a punt at the centre of the water, creating what Martyn deemed a unique sound. As an engineer, Brown had developed the idea of outdoor recording when working with Murray Head in 1973, but it was when using these techniques on Robert Palmer's Pressure Drop (1975) that he inspired Blackwell. Brown later recalled: "That was possibly the seed of recording One World that way. I don't think at this point there was any great plan about using the water. That just kind of evolved once we got set up and realised the possibility of the place." He credited the outdoor recording, "pumping whatever John was playing through a PA system and across the lake and miking it up", for making the sessions seem "magical".

Blackwell booked a large array of musicians to play on One World, resulting in what biographer Daryl Easlea compared to an "underground supergroup" with members and ex-members of Gong, Fairport Convention, Pentangle, Brand X, John Stevens Away, Gilgamesh and Traffic, among them Martyn's regular collaborators Danny Thompson, Steve Winwood, Dave Pegg, John Stevens and Kesh Sathie. Stevens, a drummer, brought jazz influences, and Winwood was responsible for a variety of instrumentation, whilst reggae trombonist Rico also makes an appearance. Rhythm sections vary between songs, with Winwood, Hansford Rowe, Thompson and Pegg variably appearing as bassist while Andy Newmark and Bruce Rowland appear as drummers. When not working, Martyn and the musicians spent time relaxing on a rubber dinghy on the lake or sunbathing; a large supply of opium also fuelled Martyn's drug habits during the stay at the farm. Brown felt that the opium generally helped keep Martyn's moods up during recording, with only occasional times when he would become drunk and difficult.

== Composition ==
"Recorded mostly outdoors by a Berkshire lake, a watery spaciousness haunts grooves never cluttered despite a support cast including Lee Perry, ska trombonist Rico Rodriguez, Steve Winwood and most of Traffic among a score of musos from the Island family."

— Mat Snow, Mojo

One World features an echoing, meditative sound with heavy usage of guitar effects. According to writer Wilson Neate, the album combines the experimental nature of Inside Out with the traditional song structures of Sunday's Child, with subtle explorations of mood influenced by the experimentation of dub music. Particularly, the dub recordings made by Perry at Black Ark influenced the album's usage of space, especially on "Smiling Stranger" and "Big Muff". Martyn's aim for the record, relative to earlier efforts, was for "the nasty bits to get nastier and the gentle bits to get more gentle." While some songs are in the vein of the "rootsy jazzy folk-rock" of Martyn's earlier work, others move into pop territory. The album's rhythm tracks feature a jazz-funk base of bass and drums overlaid with chiming guitars and intricate, delicate cross-rhythms; a Rhythm Doctor drum machine is used on "Small Hours" and "One World". Hubert Adjei-Kontoh of Pitchfork describes One World as an experimental pop record. (Note: Simon Reynolds has referred to the album as "a Let's Get It On for the Great Barrier Reef", a description largely inspired by the "reverb-rippling aquafunk" of "Dealer" and "Big Muff", two songs which "mingle the language of sex and drugs such that you're not sure what brand of addiction they're really about.")

Martyn sings on the record in a breathy, laid-back style, ranging from smooth, warm tones to a more abrasive, bluesy style; however, his voice bore a new huskiness, described by Rob Young of The Wire as "a weary grinding of words in the throat's mill." Martyn's lyrics, which highlight universal themes of love and people and occasionally social commentary, were described by journalist Monty Smith as "sensitive, sly, obsessional and elliptical, but always passionate." The lyrics also reflect the musician's troubled personal life, particularly the disintegrating relationship with his wife. "Dealer" and "Smiling Stranger" were written about Martyn's experiences with people "of dubious legality," and more explicitly divulged Martyn's drug habits than earlier songs.

=== Side one ===
"Dealer" features heavy usage of Echoplex-created reverb, blending echoing guitar with heavy drums and sinuous Moog synthesizer work to create a "dub-soaked" sound. Among the gentler songs, the title track is ethereal in style with febrile guitar, multitracked flutes and a walking bass line, eventually fading with a breathy wail. Martyn felt the theme of the title track did not need an explanation, adding: "regardless of political boundaries it is one world whether you like it or not, just because people look different on the other side of the world doesn't mean to say that they are different." In the song, the realisation that people share "one world" leaves Martyn "cold and lonely." The "dubby suspension" of "Smiling Stranger" features a complex, layered bed of voice, guitar, bass, drums, Moog synthesizer, tabla, saxophone and strings, in which George Lee's brief modal saxophone solo disrupts the shifting melody lines. Inspired by "gangsters and lowlives", the song was described by Martyn as "a piece of advice to the public", adding "I've always distrusted a smiling stranger".

Co-written with Lee Perry, "Big Muff" originated when Martyn and Perry were eating breakfast with Blackwell and his girlfriend Marianne with tea cups shaped like animals. Martyn recalled: "Scratch is going, ‘Boy, look at the muff on that!’, looking at this horse. ‘Now put this with the pig, see? Now boy, this is one big muff!’ And he was going on about his big muff, and how it was going to get away with the powder puff and everything. That guy's sense of humour is in the song. It's silly, Jamaican silly." The pair wrote the lyrics together at the breakfast table while Martyn later added the song's simplistic chords. Described by critic Vivien Goldman as resembling "a new musical form, jazz-dub", the song's reverb-heavy guitar serves as counterpoint to soft funk bass, while Moog synthesiser phases from left to right. Goldman adds that Martyn's voice "performs abrupt disappearances, bobbing up immediately at some other angle to the ears."

=== Side two ===
Side two largely comprises love songs, starting with "Couldn't Love You More", a ballad of unrequited love featuring a soft organ part from Winwood, an incessant bass line and high notes from Martyn on the line "move". The "samba-esque" "Certain Surprise" is a moderately upbeat love song featuring dense orchestration and a trombone solo from Rico. Munro said the track's bossa nova feel likely harked back to Martyn's days with session musicians Mike Kowalski and Ed Carter, who had introduced him to Latin music. "Dancing" is a joyous song with a swirling rhythm and a few momentary guitar phrases influenced by highlife music, though Munro interpreted its lyrics as "a plea – presumably to Beverley – asking that she understands how a music man must live in a world." He further described this trio of songs as some of Martyn's more commercial-leaning material to date.

The closing, eight-and-a-half minute "Small Hours" is a relaxed piece, featuring Winwood's Moog work, Echoplex-treated guitar and subtle background percussion, with a short slurred lyric centred around the refrain "Keep on loving till your love is gone, keep on loving till your love is strong, all the way." According to Blackwell, the song was recorded outdoors in the early hours, with the sound of geese audible in the background, as well as a passing train at the two-and-a-half minute mark, according to Martyn. Martyn later recalled: "I remember thinking this is fucking wonderful, recording from a speaker a half a mile away across a load of water. It was just a cool thing to do. That was ambience. They talk about ambient music now – that was real ambience". Blackwell considers the song to be "one of the best tracks I ever worked on. I think it's just magical," while musician Ralph McTell, a friend of Martyn's, has said: "If that doesn't move you, there's something wrong with you... It's a hymn to the night: reflective, dark, experimental, absolutely beautiful."

== Release ==
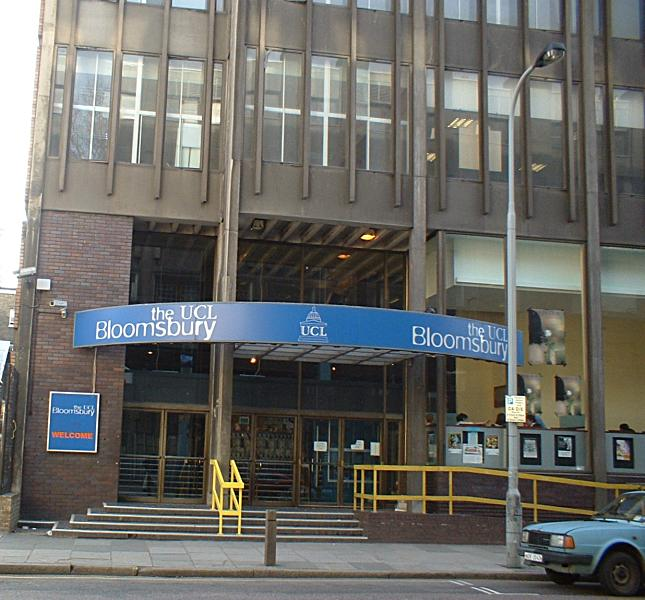
A filmed performance at the Collegiate Theatre (now the Bloomsbury Theatre) helped One World become Martyn's first chart success.

Martyn's first studio album for almost three years, One World was released by Island on 4 November 1977. The sleeve, designed by Tony Wright, depicts a mermaid rising from the ocean in an arc, with sea creatures trailing behind her alongside several cultural symbols. The track listing on the back cover listed the two sides in reversed order, due to the design being completed before the album was delivered. Martyn announced a tour of the United Kingdom for the second half of November 1977, ending with a performance at the Newcastle Polytechnic. On 20 November, when playing at the Rainbow Theatre, London, Martyn and his backing band of Rowe, Thompson and Pierre Moerlen were joined by Steve Winwood, making his first live appearance in almost a year. Martyn received criticism from fans for using the Rhythm Doctor drum machine on stage. He recalled: "People thought it was so funny, that this geezer would walk onstage with a glorified metronome. They could not see that it was in fact a bass drum, with a kick drum at the top. A lot of the things I used to fiddle about with confused people at first."

After his late 1977 tour, the musician played at the Collegiate Theatre, London on 10 January 1978; the performance was filmed by the BBC for a special edition of The Old Grey Whistle Test dedicated to introducing Martyn's music to a wider audience. Aired later the same night with an introduction from presenter Bob Harris, it helped One World debut and peak at number 54 on the UK Albums Chart at the end of the month, becoming Martyn's first charting album, although it only stayed on the chart for one week. Its success was despite being one of the musician's more experimental records of the era, and for being released at the height of the British punk rock movement; Simon Reynolds of The Guardian wrote that the album's "oceanic funk and ambient ethereality was gloriously out of step with the UK rock scene in 1977." "Dancing" was released as a single in February, backed with "Dealer". As of 1981, One World was Martyn's biggest-selling album.

== Critical reception ==
Professional ratings
Review scores
Source	Rating
AllMusic	4.5/5 stars
Encyclopedia of Popular Music	5/5 stars
The Great Rock Discography	7/10
Mojo	5/5 stars
Record Mirror	4/5 stars
The Rolling Stone Album Guide	3/5 stars
Sounds	4.5/5 stars
Uncut	5/5 stars

Upon release, One World received acclaim from music critics. In a review for Record Mirror, Mary Ann Ellis praised it as a "beautiful album with an ability to touch you with a lazy line or high/low note," adding that its sensitive, sincere nature would prevent it from selling well, but "[s]omehow I wouldn't want it to." Steven X Rea of Crawdaddy! similarly said the album – with its "private territory" feel – was not radio friendly, despite the short lengths of four songs and appearances from Winwood, Newmark and Fairport Convention's rhythm section. Describing Martyn's style as a mix of blues, jazz and rock, he hailed One World for being "as blotto and as blessed with sometimes hazy, sometimes crystalline music, as anything he's ever done," drawing comparisons with Bessie Smith, Hoagy Carmichael and Skip James. Monty Smith of NME felt the "mean, moogy and magnificent" album was the most "mesmerising" he had heard that year, deeming it "plain better than anything else."

Mark Prendergast of Melody Maker commented that Martyn "seems fated to inspire madness and mayhem, no matter how utterly shambolic the circumstances he finds himself in," feeling this may be due to his uniquely "foggy" voice and ability to "trick out what are invariably simple songs with ravishing detail." In Sounds, Vivien Goldman hailed Blackwell's deeply sympathetic production and the inventive music, praising Martyn for carrying the "spirit of John Cale/Terry Riley music expansion", while feeling he is "not taken as seriously as he should be". Dave Belbin of Gongster described the album as very warm and "full-sounding", comparable to "an armchair before an open fire, somewhat stoned, keeping the cold winter at bay." In an article for Liverpool Echo, Chris Salewicz said the "strong and very worthwhile" One World features a more brittle and creative side to Martyn's "always powerful emotions and moods." In their critics' polls, NME ranked it the 26th best album of 1977, whilst OOR ranked it 42nd best of 1978.

Among retrospective reviews, Wilson Neate of AllMusic felt that the "electrified swagger" of "Big Muff" was the highlight of the pop-leaning songs, while finding the album's "understated explorations of mood" to be even more compelling, particularly citing the title track and "Small Hours" for their "mesmerizing, smoky grooves". Reviewing the reissue, Uncut hailed the album as "[t]rue, liquid essence", saying Martyn "achieved the sort of rich sonic brine that perfectly depicts the state of his soul," with songs taking listeners to "a place of solitude and intimacy like only he can," highlighting "Small Hours" for being arguably Martyn's finest song. In The Great Rock Discography, Martin C. Strong said that One World was, despite Martyn's increasing fan base in 1977, as "esoteric as ever" with its influences from dub and "oblique ambience." Nick Dale listed the "pretty drugged-out record" among Martyn's essential albums in Rock: The Rough Guide, saying it contained some of the musician's most powerful and enduring songs, and highlighting the guitar effects and overall "wonderful echoing and meditative soundscape".

== Legacy ==
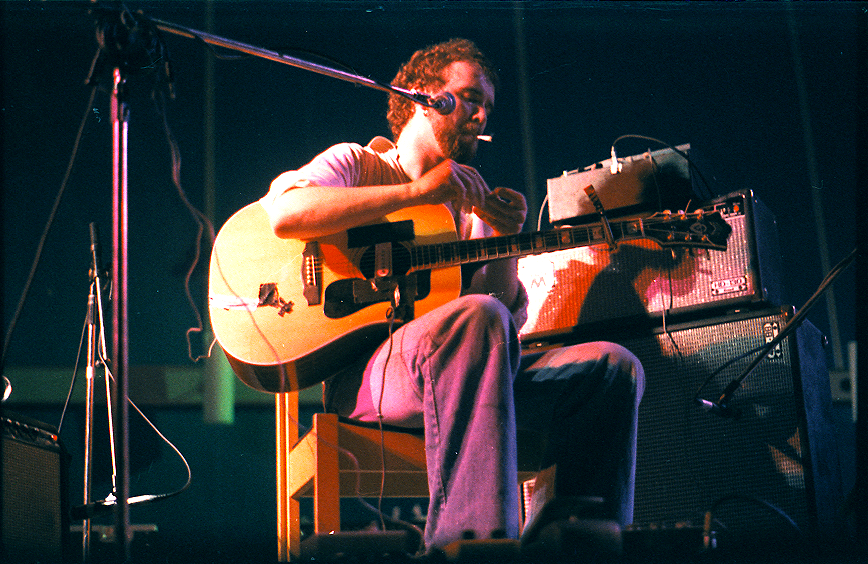
Martyn on tour in Bristol, 1978

One World is considered one of Martyn's best-loved albums. The musician, who had a noted distaste for some of his previous records, was pleased with the album, and continued to play some of its songs live for the rest of his life. He later said: "You can really tell we were somewhere else when we made it. I was really pleased with it." The album's more pop-oriented songs signalled the slicker pop direction Martyn began exploring with Grace and Danger (1980), an album which expanded on the personal themes of One World following John and Beverley's divorce. Easlea considers One World to bridge Martyn's earlier, more simple folk-based music with the "strutting, jazz-inflected rock" he began exploring in the 1980s and 1990s. In 2004, Island Records released a "Deluxe Edition" of the record with bonus material, including alternate versions of songs and five live performances.

Due to its dubby, "echoing soundscapes" and experimental nature, One World has been cited as originating trip hop music, which emerged in earnest in the 1990s with groups like Portishead, whom Martyn later covered. According to Brian Boyd of The Irish Times, the "weirdly experimental" album – which he considers possibly Martyn's most underrated – is regarded as the first album in the genre. "Smiling Stranger" has been described as a forerunner to the sound of Massive Attack and was called "one of the great moments in dub" by world music pioneer Jah Wobble. In The Guardian, Reynolds credited "Small Hours" for anticipating the Durutti Column, feeling this possibly exemplified Factory Records's "hippy-dippy side" – the staff had been fans of Martyn – for returning "after the rupture of punk". In his liner notes for the reissue, Easlea credits the album's sonic developments, namely being able to operate a live feed across a lake so sessions could be taped in the open air, "picking up the full ambience of the surroundings", as an innovation which would prove as important as Giorgio Moroder's contemporary production of "I Feel Love" by Donna Summer.

One World was ranked number 948 in Colin Larkin's All Time Top 1000 Albums (2000), comparing its lack of indifference to Martyn's temperament. It is listed in the book 1001 Albums You Must Hear Before You Die (2008), where Easlea describes it as "an almost perfect piece of work, a smart album made by one very smart hippie." In 2005, The Word included the album in their list "Hidden Treasure: Great Underrated Albums of Our Time", having been chosen for inclusion by Anton Corbijn, who directed music videos for Martyn. When selecting Martyn as part of a "100 Great Voices" feature, Mojo chose the title track as an example of his talent. "Small Hours" was later reworked by Martyn into the track "Anna" as the backdrop for Esben Storm's 1978 Australian film production of In Search of Anna. Martyn later re-recorded the acoustic ballad "Couldn't Love You More" for Glorious Fool (1981). In 2007, the song was covered by Lisa Hannigan in collaboration with Faultline.

== Track listing ==
All tracks composed by John Martyn except where indicated.

=== Side one ===
1. "Dealer" – 4:58
2. "One World" – 4:10
3. "Smiling Stranger" – 3:29
4. "Big Muff" (Martyn, Lee Perry) – 6:30

=== Side two ===
1. "Couldn't Love You More" – 3:07
2. "Certain Surprise" – 3:52
3. "Dancing" – 3:43
4. "Small Hours" – 8:45

=== Deluxe Edition track listing ===
==== Disc one (original album remastered) ====
1. "Dealer" – 4:59
2. "One World" – 4:04
3. "Smiling Stranger" 3:30
4. "Big Muff" – 6:32
5. "Couldn't Love You More" – 3:08
6. "Certain Surprise" – 3:52
7. "Dancing" – 3:56
8. "Small Hours" – 8:44

==== Disc two ====
1. "Certain Surprise" (Live) – 3:06
2. "Couldn't Love You More" (Live) – 3:12
3. "One World" (Live) – 5:20
4. "Dealer" (Live) – 6:11
5. "Small Hours" (Live) – 7:23
6. "Black Man At Your Shoulder" – 5:54
7. "Dealer" (Alternate Version #1) – 4:31
8. "One World" (Alternate Version) – 4:06
9. "Smiling Stranger" (Instrumental) – 4:43
10. "Big Muff" (Alternate Version) – 6:47
11. "Certain Surprise" (Alternate Version) – 4:48
12. "Dancing" (Alternate Version) – 3:44
13. "Big Muff" (Drum Machine Version) – 4:53
14. "Dealer" (Alternate Version #2) – 4:56
15. "Small Hours" (Instrumental) – 10:20

== Personnel ==
Adapted from the liner notes of One World

- John Martyn – vocals, guitar, harmonica
- Jon Field – flute (2)
- Steve Winwood – bass (1), electric piano (2, 6), Moog synthesiser (1, 3, 8), Yamaha organ (5, 8)
- Dave Pegg – bass (7)
- Neil Murray – bass (3)
- Andy Newmark – drums (1)
- Morris Pert – percussion (4, 8)
- Harry Robinson – string arrangements (3, 6)
- Hansford Rowe – bass (2, 4)
- Bruce Rowland – drums (6, 7)
- Keshav Sathe – tabla (3)
- Danny Thompson – bass (5, 6)
- John Stevens – drums (3, 4)
- George Lee – saxophone (3)
- Rico Rodriguez – trombone (6)

Technical

- Phill Brown, Frank Owen, Robert Ash – recording engineers
- Tony Wright – cover design
