= Glasgow Walker =

Studio album by John Martyn
- Released: May 22, 2000
- Studio: The Joe Snowdon Memorial Shed: Million Dollar Studios (Cornwall, UK); The Washoose (South Lanarkshire, Scotland); Mill Studios (Kilkenny, Ireland)
- Genre: Folk rock, folk jazz, trip hop
- Length: 53:02
- Label: Independiente
- Producer: John Martyn: Spencer Cozens; Guy Barker; Anthony Minghella; Graham Walker; Gabriel Yared

John Martyn chronology
The Church with One Bell (1998)	Glasgow Walker (2000)	On the Cobbles (2004)

Professional ratings
Review scores
Source	Rating
AllMusic	3/5 stars
The Encyclopedia of Popular Music	3/5 stars

Glasgow Walker is a 2000 album by the British singer-songwriter John Martyn. It was his first album to be written on a keyboard rather than a guitar, after a suggestion from his friend Phil Collins. It contains trip hop influences, which Martyn had experimented with on his earlier album And. Kathryn Williams is featured on backing vocals on "Can't Live Without" and "The Field of Play." The album was dedicated to Rod Woolnough.

Glasgow Walker peaked at No. 66 on the UK Albums Chart.

== Critical reception ==
The Birmingham Post called the album "probably [Martyn's] most assured album in a decade, a moving, heart-on-sleeve affair that finds him in fine voice."

== Track listing ==
All tracks composed by John Martyn except where indicated.

1. "So Sweet" - 4:50
2. "Wildflower" - 6:24
3. "The Field of Play" - 5:48
4. "Cool In This Life" - 4:20
5. "Feel So Good" - 5:20
6. "Cry Me a River" (Arthur Hamilton) - 5:45
7. "Mama T" - 5:52
8. "Can't Live Without" - 4:12
9. "The Cat Won't Work Tonight" - 4:57
10. "You Don't Know What Love Is" (Gene DePaul, Don Raye) - 5:19

== Personnel ==
- John Martyn – vocals, guitars, keyboards (2)
- Spencer Cozens – keyboards (1–7, 9), programming (1–4)
- Stefon Taylor – programming (1–3, 6, 7, 9), keyboard bass (1, 7)
- Phil Cunningham – accordion (3)
- Glasgow Gangster Funk [Gary Gilroy] – programming (4, 5, 7, 8)
- Alex Boyesen – programming (6)
- Reginald Hastings – slide guitar (1, 2, 5), milk bottles (9)
- Alan Thomson – bass guitar (3, 6, 9), slide acoustic guitar (6)
- Jim Lampi – Chapman stick (3, 4)
- Stanley Guffogg – bass guitar (4, 5)
- Arran Ahmun – drums (1, 2), percussion (1, 7)
- Dave Heath – bass flute (2)
- Rowen Cozens – violin (3)
- Kathryn Williams – backing vocals (3), additional backing vocals (8)

The Guy Barker International Quintet on "You Don't Know What Love Is"

- Guy Barker
- Perico Sambeat
- Bernardo Sassetti
- Geoff Gascoyne
- Sebastian De Krom

== Production ==
- John Martyn – executive producer, producer
- Spencer Cozens – producer (1–9), engineer, mixing
- Douglas "Bone" Graham – co-producer (1–3, 6, 9), engineer
- Reginald Hastings – co-producer (1–3, 6, 9), mixing
- Stefon Taylor – co-producer (1–3, 6, 9), engineer
- Dave Brinkworth – additional producer (4, 5, 7, 8), additional mixing (4, 5, 7, 8)
- Gary Gilroy – additional producer (4, 5, 7, 8), additional mixing (4, 5, 7, 8)
- Harry Warren – additional producer (4, 5, 7, 8), additional mixing (4, 5, 7, 8)
- Guy Barker – producer (10)
- Anthony Minghella – producer (10)
- Graham Walker – producer (10)
- Gabriel Yared – producer (10)
- Alex Boyesen – additional engineer
- Spenser McGeachy – additional engineer
- Nick Webb – mastering at Abbey Road Studios (London, UK)
- Ryan Art – sleeve design
- Paul Cox – photography
