= So Far So Good =

So Far So Good may refer to:

- So Far So Good (film), 2014
- So Far So Good (Bryan Adams album), 1993
- So Far So Good (The Chainsmokers album), 2022
- So Far So Good (John Martyn album), 1977
- So Far So Good (Meernaa album), 2023
- So Far So Good (video), a 2001 DVD by Atomic Kitten
- "So Far So Good" (song), by Thornley, 2004
- So Far So Good, a 2011 album by Tito Jackson
- "So Far So Good", a song by Bryan Adams from Anthology
- "So Far So Good", a song by Sheena Easton from the soundtrack of the 1986 film About Last Night...
- "So Far So Good", a song by Slade from Slade in Flame
- "So Far So Good", a 1994 autobiography by Burgess Meredith
- "So Far So Good", a song by Andy Breckman on the album Proud Dad
- "So Far So Good: Final Poems 2014–2018", a collection of poems by Ursula K. Le Guin
- So Far So Good, a French company that developed the game Incredibox

== See also ==
- So Far, So Good... So What!, an album by Megadeth
