= So Far So Good (John Martyn album) =

Compilation album by John Martyn
- Released: 4 March 1977
- Genre: Folk rock
- Label: Island
- Producer: John Martyn, John Wood

Professional ratings
Review scores
Source	Rating
Allmusic	3/5 stars

So Far So Good is a compilation album by John Martyn, with selected tracks taken from the albums Bless The Weather, Solid Air and Sunday's Child. The live track I'd Rather Be The Devil is unique to this release and was recorded 16th March 1975 at the Rainbow Theatre, London.

== Track listing ==
=== Side One ===
1. "May You Never"
2. "Bless The Weather"
3. "Head and Heart"
4. "Over The Hill"
5. "Spencer the Rover"

=== Side Two ===
1. "Glistening Glyndebourne"
2. "Solid Air"
3. "One Day Without You"
4. "I'd Rather Be The Devil"
