= Bless the Weather =

Studio album by John Martyn
- Released: November 1971
- Recorded: 17–21 May 1971
- Studio: Sound Techniques, Chelsea, London
- Genre: British folk rock, folk jazz
- Length: 37:32 (original release); 75:19 (2005 reissue)
- Label: Island
- Producer: John Martyn, John Wood

John Martyn chronology
The Road to Ruin (1970)	Bless the Weather (1971)	Solid Air (1973)

Professional ratings
Review scores
Source	Rating
AllMusic	4.5/5 stars
The Guardian	4/5 stars
Record Collector	4/5 stars

Bless the Weather is a 1971 album by John Martyn and marks his return to being a solo artist, having released two albums with his wife Beverley Martyn. The writing reflects their move from London to Hastings Old Town. When it was released it garnered his best reviews to date and remains a favourite among fans, featuring such standards as "Head and Heart" along with the title track. The album is predominantly acoustic, although it does feature Martyn's first real 'echoplex track' in "Glistening Glyndebourne".

Q in 1999 chose Bless the Weather among the dozen essential folk albums of all time. According to Q the album was recorded in just three days (but one of the two bass players, Tony Reeves, has Monday 17 May, 6pm Sound Techniques and Friday 21 May 1pm to 6pm in his 1971 diary). In November 2007 Bless the Weather was included in a list by The Guardian of '1000 Albums to Hear Before You Die'. It was voted number 684 in Colin Larkin's All Time Top 1000 Albums third edition (2000).

== Track listing ==
All tracks composed by John Martyn except where indicated.

1. "Go Easy" – 4:15
2. "Bless the Weather" – 4:29
3. "Sugar Lump" – 3:43
4. "Walk to the Water" – 2:49
5. "Just Now" – 3:39
6. "Head and Heart" – 4:54
7. "Let the Good Things Come" – 3:05
8. "Back Down the River" – 2:40
9. "Glistening Glyndebourne" – 6:30
10. "Singin' in the Rain" (Nacio Herb Brown, Arthur Freed) – 1:28

Bonus tracks

1. "Walk to the Water" (Take 3) (3:34)
2. "Bless the Weather" (Take 4) (5:37)
3. "Back Down the River" (Take 1) (2:44)
4. "Go Easy" (Take 1) (4:39)
5. "Glistening Glyndebourne" (Take 2) (7:48)
6. "Head and Heart" (Band Version) (10:17)
7. "May You Never" (Single Version) (2:45)

== Personnel ==
- John Martyn - vocals, guitar, harmonica, keyboards
- Richard Thompson - guitar
- Smiley De Jonnes - percussion
- Beverley Martyn - guitar, vocals
- Danny Thompson - double bass
- Tony Reeves - double bass, bass guitar
- Ian Whiteman - keyboards
- Roger Powell - drums

Technical

- Steve Mayberry - engineer
- Visualeyes - design, photography
