= Inside Out (John Martyn album) =

Studio album by John Martyn
- Released: October 1973
- Recorded: 2–8 July 1973
- Studio: Island (London)
- Genres: Folk jazz, folk rock
- Length: 39:46
- Label: Island
- Producer: John Martyn

John Martyn chronology
Solid Air (1973)	Inside Out (1973)	Sunday's Child (1975)

Professional ratings
Review scores
Source	Rating
Allmusic	3/5 stars

Inside Out is an album released in 1973 by British singer-songwriter John Martyn. His fifth solo album, it was also his most experimental, and the jazziest album in his catalog. The album features two that are favourites with his fans, "Fine Lines" and "Make No Mistake", as well as two songs that he enjoyed playing live as jazz epics, "Outside In" and "Look In".

An 18-minute live version of "Outside In" appears on Martyn's self-distributed Live at Leeds album.

The song "Make No Mistake" references John Coltrane's "A Love Supreme".

== Track listing ==
All tracks composed and arranged by John Martyn

1. "Fine Lines" (3:49)
2. "Eibhli Ghail Chiuin Ni Chearbhail" (Traditional; arranged by Martyn) (3:08)
3. "Ain't No Saint" (3:36)
4. "Outside In" (8:23)
5. "The Glory of Love" (Billy Hill) (1:57)
6. "Look In" (2:54)
7. "Beverley" (3:55)
8. "Make No Mistake" (5:58)
9. "Ways To Cry" (2:59)
10. "So Much in Love With You" (2:50)

=== Bonus tracks ===
1. "Beverley/Make No Mistake" (5:21)
2. "Fine Lines" (3:12)
3. "Eibhli Ghail Chiuin Ni Chearbhail" (2:57)
4. "Outside In" (7:48)

Bonus tracks 1–3 recorded 10 October 1973, for session for Bob Harris's show Sounds of the Seventies on BBC Radio 1; bonus track 4 recorded 23 May 1973, for same series

== Personnel ==
- John Martyn – vocals, guitar
- Danny Thompson – bass, double bass
- Chris Stewart – bass
- Steve Winwood – bass, keyboards
- Chris Wood – flute, horns
- Remi Kabaka – percussion
- Keshav Sathe – tabla
- Bobby Keyes – saxophone

== See also ==
- Echoplex
