= Whatever (Danny Thompson album) =

Studio album by Danny Thompson
- Released: 1987
- Studio: Magritte Studios, Middlesex, UK
- Genre: Folk jazz
- Label: Rykomusic
- Producer: Dan Priest; Danny Thompson

Danny Thompson chronology
Whatever (1987)	Whatever Next (1989)

Professional ratings
Review scores
Source	Rating
Allmusic	3.5/5 stars
The Penguin Guide to Jazz	4/4 stars

Whatever is the debut solo album by the English double bassist Danny Thompson. It was released by Rykomusic in 1987.

== Reception ==
AllMusic awarded the album with 3.5 stars and its review by Steve Leggett states: "Highlights include the atmospheric "Till Minnie Av Jan", the very Pentangle-like "Swedish Dance," and "Lament for Alex". The Penguin Guide awarded the album with 4 stars and its review describes the album as: "One of the most intriguing group debuts in British music of the 1980s".

== Track listing ==
All compositions by Danny Thompson, Tony Roberts and Bernie Holland except where noted.

1. "Idle Monday" – 4:08
2. "Till Minnie Av Jan" – 4:50
3. "Yucateca" – 5:14
4. "Lovely Joan" (Traditional) – 6:34
5. "Swedish Dance" (Traditional) – 5:44
6. "Lament for Alex" (for Alex Campbell) – 4:42
7. "Crusader" – 5:26
8. "Minor Escapade" – 5:13

== Musicians ==
- Danny Thompson: double bass
- Tony Roberts: tenor, alto and soprano saxophones, Northumbrian pipes, clarinet, flute, sopranina, whistle
- Bernie Holland: guitars, B-H tone harp
