= Danny Thompson =

English double bassist (1939–2025)

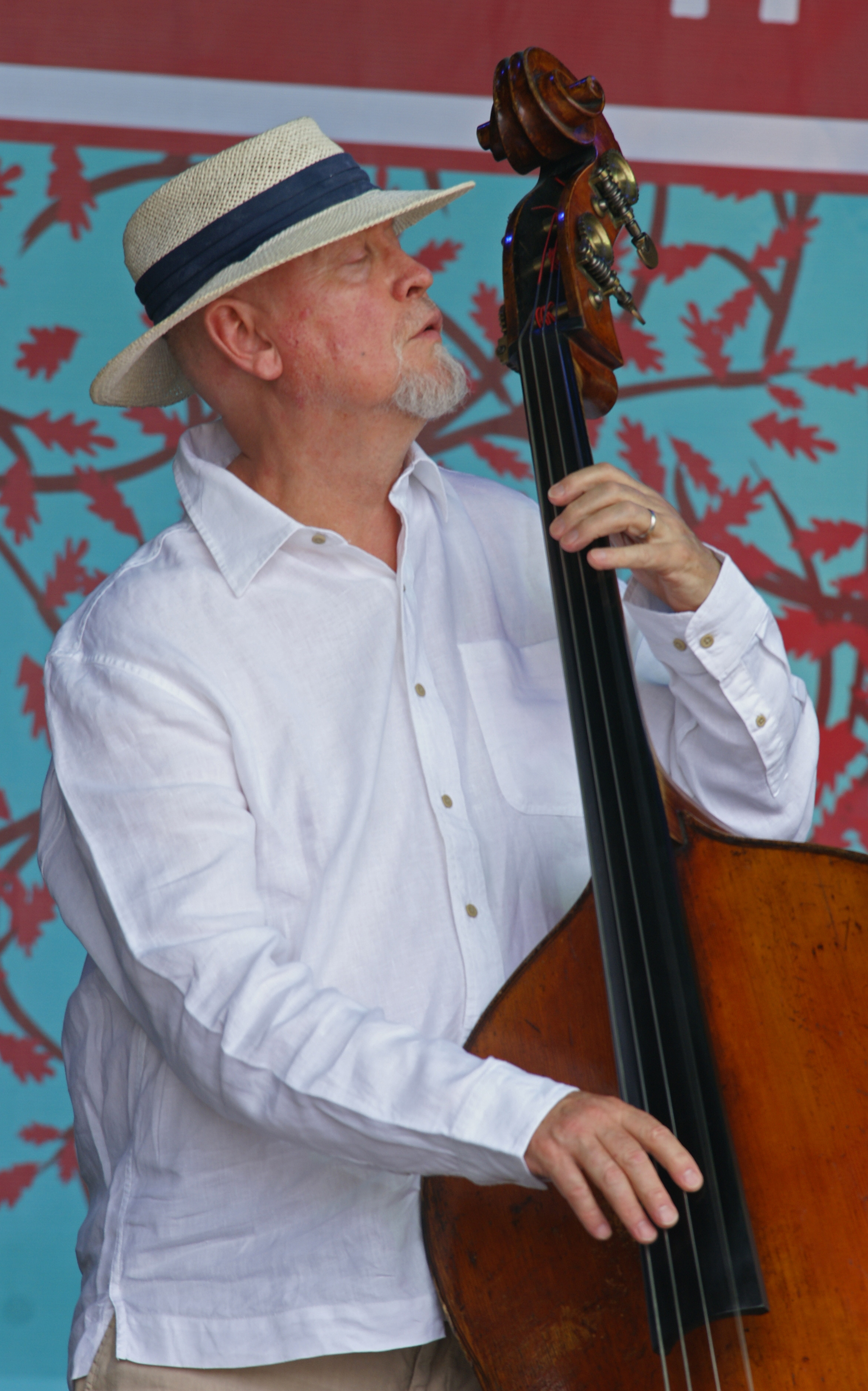
- Thompson performing in 2008

Background information
- Also known as: Hamza Thompson
- Born: Daniel Henry Edward Thompson; 4 April 1939; Teignmouth, Devon, England
- Died: 23 September 2025 (aged 86) Rickmansworth, Hertfordshire, England
- Genres: Folk; rock; jazz; blues; skiffle
- Occupation: Musician; songwriter; record producer
- Instruments: Upright bass; tea chest bass
- Years active: 1964–2024
- Labels: Island; Rykodisc
- Website: Official website

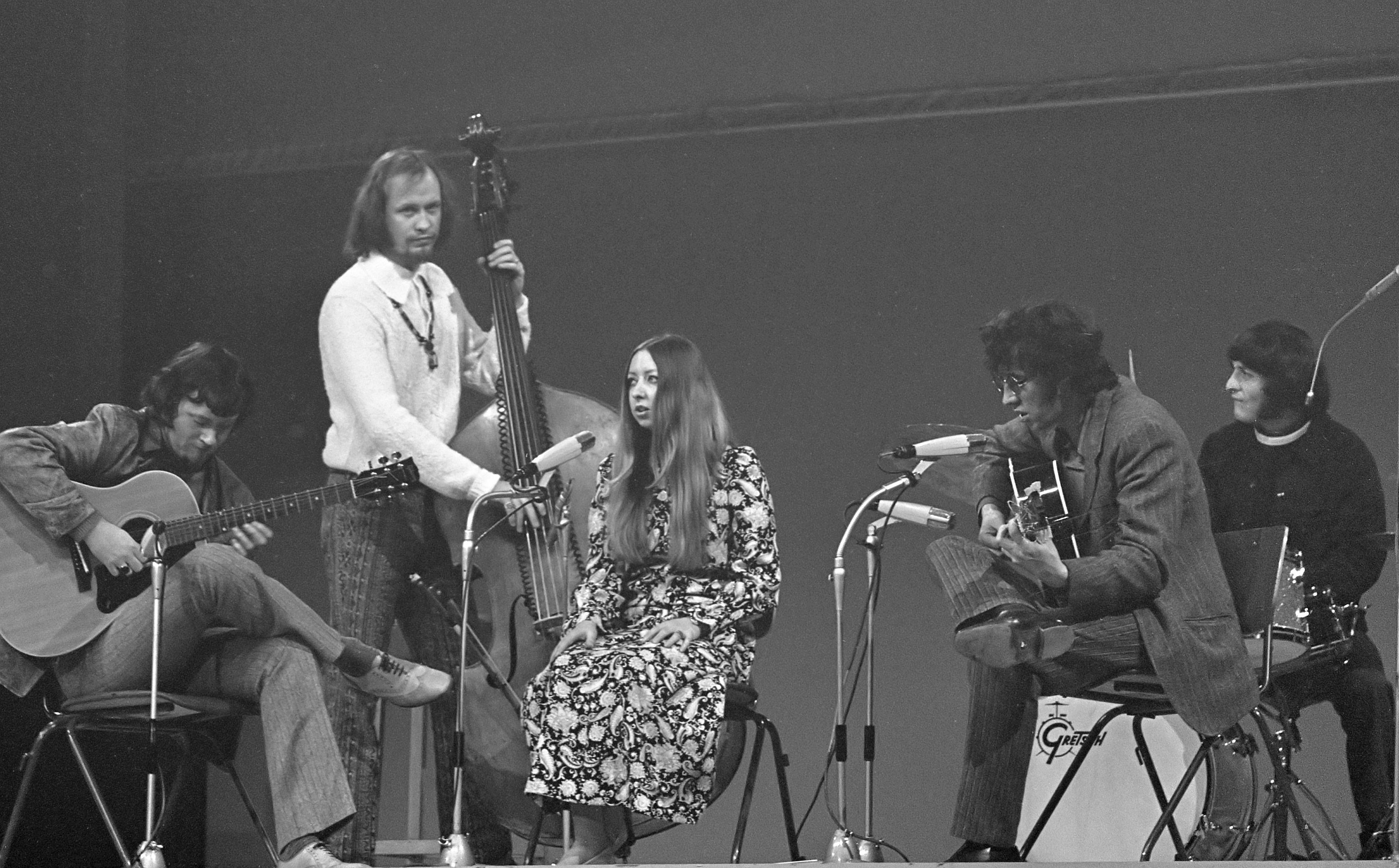
Thompson with Pentangle, in Amsterdam, 1969

Daniel Henry Edward Thompson (4 April 1939 – 23 September 2025) was an English multi-instrumentalist, best known as a double bassist. During a long musical career he played with a large variety of other musicians, particularly Richard Thompson and John Martyn. The Times said he had "a technical virtuosity and an intuitive feel for whatever he was playing".

For four years between 1964 and 1967 Thompson was a member of Alexis Korner's Blues Incorporated. He led a trio that included guitarist John McLaughlin and was a founding member of the British folk-jazz band Pentangle. Between 1987 and 2012 he recorded six solo albums. He converted to Islam in 1990.

== Life and career ==
Thompson was born in Teignmouth, Devon, England, on 4 April 1939. He was named after a favourite song of his parents, 'Danny Boy'. His father, a miner, joined the Royal Navy at the start of World War II and was lost in action as a submariner. When Thompson was aged six the family moved to London and he was brought up in the working-class area of Battersea. At school he played competitive football and was a junior for Chelsea, the team he would support for the rest of his life, and was also a competent boxer. While at school he learnt guitar, mandolin, trumpet and trombone before settling on the double bass as his instrument of choice. He played his first professional gig, while under age, in a Soho strip club.

Thompson was called up for National Service and spent two years in Penang, Malaysia, where he played trombone in the army band. He was discharged in 1963 and resumed playing double bass. In 1964 he spent £5, to be paid in instalments of five shillings a week, on a double bass at Foote's bass shop in Brewer St, Soho, London, which he used for his entire career. The instrument had been painted brown, but wear and tear revealed it to be an original, and valuable, French Gand, made in 1865. As the instrument was from the Victorian era he named it "Victoria". He acquired a second double bass in 2007 for use when travelling overseas.

His varied session work, often three sessions in a day, ranged from working with Marianne Faithfull to the theme tune of Thunderbirds, and "most nights he could be found playing in jazz clubs. For four years between 1964 and 1967 he was a member of Alexis Korner's Blues Incorporated, replacing future Cream bassist Jack Bruce. He led a trio that included guitarist John McLaughlin. Thompson was a member of the folk-jazz group Pentangle throughout its first incarnation (1967–1973) and in some of its subsequent versions and reunions.

In the early 1980s he worked with documentary film-maker Roy Deverell to compose music for two of his award-winning films, Echo of the Wild and A Passion to Protect, about John Aspinall's work with endangered mammals. In 1987 Thompson released his debut solo album, Whatever, to critical acclaim and recorded three more.

While he had his own album releases, Thompson was predominantly a session musician contributing to other artists' recordings and tours. He worked with John Martyn and with Richard Thompson on Mirror Blue (1994), The Old Kit Bag (2003) and the concert DVD release Richard Thompson Live in Austin Texas (2001), (from the Austin City Limits televised concerts). Between 1995 and 2013 he was a member of the house band in five of the six series of the BBC/RTE Transatlantic Sessions. Thompson received a Lifetime achievement award in the 2007 BBC Radio 2 Folk Awards. After several years of "rock'n'roll" touring with John Martyn, he bought a 16th century manor house and 27 acres of land in Suffolk and took up horse-riding and bird-watching.

On 8 June 2024 Thompson performed at the Royal Albert Hall London as part of Fairport Convention guitarist Richard Thompson's 75th birthday celebration. Than aged 85, he contributed to an acoustic section which featured a guest appearance from Ralph McTell, with Michael Doucet of BeauSoleil on fiddle and John Etheridge of Soft Machine on guitar.

Reported by Uncut magazine, Kate Bush recalled, "You never just worked with Danny. You also worked with his double bass he called Victoria. The two of them were joined at the hip and together they were the most fascinating storytellers – earthy and of the wild."

== Private life and death ==
Thompson lived in Clopton, Suffolk, during the late 1970s and early 1980s with his wife, Daphne, and son Dan (Danny Junior), who became the drummer with Hawkwind (1985–88). Early in the 1980s he moved back to London. He converted to Islam in 1990 and adopted the Muslim name Hamza.

Thompson died at his home in Rickmansworth, Hertfordshire, on 23 September 2025, at the age of 86.

== Partial discography ==
=== Alexis Korner's Blues Incorporated ===
- Red Hot from Alex (1964)
- Sky High (1966)
- Blues Incorporated (1967 – re-issue of Sky High)

=== Alexis Korner ===
- I Wonder Who (1967)
- A New Generation of Blues (1968)

=== Pentangle ===
- The Pentangle (1968)
- Sweet Child (1968)
- Basket of Light (1969)
- Cruel Sister (1970)
- Reflection (1971)
- Solomon's Seal (1972)
- Open the Door (1984)

=== Danny Thompson ===
- Whatever (1987)
- Whatever Next (1989)
- Elemental (1990)
- Whatever's Best (1995)
- Danny Thompson & Peter Knight (1995) Resurgence – RES108CD
- Connected (2012)

=== Danny Thompson, Allan Holdsworth and John Stevens ===
- Propensity (2009, recorded 1978)

=== Dizrhythmia ===
- Dizrhythmia (1988)
- Too (2016)

=== Richard Thompson ===
- Amnesia (1988)
- Mirror Blue (1994)
- Live at Crawley (1995)
- You? Me? Us? (1996)
- Two Letter Words (1996)
- Celtschmerz (1998)
- Mock Tudor (1999)
- Semi-Detached Mock Tudor (2002)
- The Old Kit Bag (2003)
- Ducknapped! (2003)
- Live from Austin, TX (2005)
- Sweet Warrior (2007)

=== Richard Thompson and Danny Thompson ===
- Live at Crawley (1995)
- Industry (1997)

=== Jon Thorne & Danny Thompson ===
- Watching the Well (2010)

=== John and Beverly Martyn ===
- John Martyn: Bless the Weather (1972); Solid Air (1973); Inside Out (1973); Sunday's Child (1975); Live at Leeds (1975); One World (1977); Germany 1986 (July 2001); On the Cobbles (2004)
- John & Beverley Martyn: The Road to Ruin (1970)

=== Others ===
Danny Thompson has played on dozens of albums and singles during his career. The following is only a small selection.

- ABC: Alphabet City (1987)
- Ayuo: Songs from a Eurasian Journey (1997)
- Richard Barbieri: Stranger Inside (2008)
- Eric Bibb & North Country Far: The Happiest Man in the World (2016)
- The Blind Boys of Alabama: Spirit of the Century (2001), Go Tell It on the Mountain (2003)
- Sam Brown: Stop! (1988)
- Tim Buckley: Dream Letter: Live in London 1968 (1968)
- Kate Bush: The Dreaming (1982); Hounds of Love (1985); Director's Cut (2011); 50 Words for Snow (2011)
- John Cameron: Off Centre (1969)
- Christine Collister: The Dark Gift of Time (1998); An Equal Love (2001)
- Graham Coxon: The Spinning Top (2009)
- Barbara Dickson: Don't Think Twice (1992); Dark End of the Street (1995)
- Donovan: Barabajagal (1968); HMS Donovan (1971); Essence to Essence (1973); Love Is Only Feeling (1981); Sutras (1996); Beat Cafe (2004)
- Nick Drake: Five Leaves Left (1969)
- Everything but the Girl: Amplified Heart (1994)
- Marianne Faithfull: North Country Maid (1966); The World of Marianne Faithfull (1970)
- Peter Gabriel: Up (2002)
- Davey Graham: Folk Blues & Beyond (1965); Large as Life & Twice as Natural (1968); Hat (1969); Fire in the Soul (1999)
- Boo Hewerdine: Baptist Hospital (1995)
- Mary Hopkin: Earth Song / Ocean Song (1971); Live at the Royal Festival Hall 1972 (2005)
- Hunter Muskett: Every Time You Move (1970)
- The Incredible String Band: The 5000 Spirits (1967); Hard Rope & Silken Twine (1973)
- Bert Jansch: Birthday Blues (1969); Moonshine (1972); L.A. Turnaround (1974); Avocet (1979); Sketches (1990)
- Tasmin Archer: Great Expectations (1992)
- Linda Lewis: Fathoms Deep (1973)
- Mike Lindup: Changes (1990)
- Magna Carta: Lord of the Ages (1973)
- Mara!: Images (1984); On the Edge (1987)
- The Chris McGregor Septet: Up to Earth (1969. released 2008 by Fledg'ling CD, Stamford Audio vinyl)
- Loreena McKennitt: The Book of Secrets (1997)
- Ralph McTell: Easy (1974)
- Alison Moyet: Hoodoo (1991)
- Duffy Power (as Duffy's Nucleus): Mary Open the Door/Hound Dog single (1967; re-released on various compilation albums)
- Deva Premal: Dakshina (2005)
- Cliff Richard: Congratulations (1968)
- Andrew Ridgeley: Son of Albert (1990)
- S. E. Rogie: Dead Men Don't Smoke Marijuana (1997)
- Darrell Scott: Theatre of the Unheard (2003); Live in NC (2004)
- Skin: Fleshwounds (2003)
- Justin Sullivan: Navigating By The Stars (2003)
- Songhai. Collaboration with flamenco group Ketama and kora player Toumani Diabaté: Songhai (1988); Songhai 2 (1994)
- Vivian Stanshall: Crank (1991)
- Rod Stewart: Every Picture Tells a Story (1971)
- David Sylvian: Brilliant Trees (1984); Secrets of the Beehive (1987)
- T. Rex: Light of Love (1974); Zinc Alloy and the Hidden Riders of Tomorrow (1974)
- Talk Talk: The Colour of Spring (1986); Spirit of Eden (1988)
- Sean Taylor: Chase The Night (2013)
- Thunderbirds (TV series): (theme tune) (1964)
- Loudon Wainwright III: I'm Alright (1985); More Love Songs (1986); Therapy (1989)
- Dawud Wharnsby: Vacuous Waxing (2004)
