= On the Cobbles =

On The Cobbles

Studio album by John Martyn
- Released: 26 April 2004
- Genre: Folk jazz, folk rock, electronica
- Length: 45:15
- Label: Independiente
- Producer: Jim Tullio: Garry Pollitt; Spencer Cozens

John Martyn chronology
| Glasgow Walker (2000) | On The Cobbles (2004) | Heaven and Earth (2011) |

On the Cobbles was the final studio album by John Martyn released during his lifetime (his last studio album, Heaven and Earth, was released posthumously), released in 2004. The album was recorded at various studios in Ireland, the UK and US including Woolengrange in Ireland; The Toolshed, Chicago USA; Doon The Cellar, Birkenhead; Swan Yard Studios, London; Parr Street Studios, Liverpool; Hornyold Road Studios, Worcestershire and at The Caliope Recorders, Chicago, USA. It features guest appearances from Paul Weller, Nick McCabe, and long-time collaborator Danny Thompson.

The album was dedicated to "the surgical team & nurses of Orthopaedic Ward One at Waterford Hospital, Waterford, Ireland."

== Track listing ==
All tracks composed by John Martyn except where indicated.

1. "Baby Come Home" (Frankie Miller) – 3:28
2. "Under My Wing" – 4:10
3. "Ghosts" – 4:03
4. "Back to Marseilles" – 4:20
5. "Cobbles" – 3:52
6. "My Creator" – 7:17
7. "One for the Road" – 4:05
8. "Go Down Easy" – 4:57
9. "Walking Home" – 4:49
10. "Goodnight Irene" (Lead Belly, John Lomax) – 4:14

== Personnel ==
- John Martyn – vocals, acoustic guitar (1–5, 9), Mutron guitar (1, 3–5, 7), hi-string acoustic guitar (7), electric guitar (8, 9)
- Scott Steiner – Hammond B3 organ (2)
- Paul Weller – Wurlitzer electric piano (2), Hammond B3 organ (2), acoustic guitar (2), backing vocals (2)
- Spencer Cozens – acoustic piano (6, 10), electric piano (9), organ (10)
- John Scully – keyboards (6)
- Chris Cameron – Rhodes electric piano (8)
- John Rice – mandolin (1)
- Nick McCabe – electric guitar (9)
- Alan Thomson – bass (1, 2, 5, 9, 10), electric bass (6)
- John Giblin – bass (3, 7), acoustic bass (4), electric bass (6)
- Danny Thompson – acoustic bass (6)
- Arran Ahmun – drums (2, 5, 6, 9, 10), percussion (5)
- Greg Marsh – drums (3, 4, 8), percussion (6)
- Paul Burn – drums (7)
- Garry Pollitt – percussion (1), keyboards (5)
- Jim Tullio – percussion (1–4, 6, 7, 9), acoustic guitar (2, 9, 10), keyboards (5), bass (7), acoustic bass (8)
- Peter Erskine – congas (7)
- Kahil El'Zabar – percussion (8)
- Paul Mertens – bass harmonica (1)
- Steve Eisen – alto flute (2)
- Tony Peers – trumpet (3)
- Andy Sheppard – soprano saxophone (6), tenor saxophone (6)
- Ari Brown – tenor saxophone (8)
- Mavis Staples – vocals (10)

The bass line on "My Creator" is a combination of parts recorded by Danny Thompson, Alan Thomson and John Giblin.

=== Production ===
- Jim Tullio – producer, engineer, mixing
- Garry Politt – co-producer, engineer
- Spencer Cozens – co-producer (10)
- Scott Steiner – mixing, additional engineer
- John Giblin – additional engineer
- Joshua Shapera – additional engineer
- Lonny "DJ 007" Bonds – assistant engineer
- Mick Cave – assistant engineer
- Jan Lowenhaupt – assistant engineer
- Darren Simpson – assistant engineer
- Andrea Wright – assistant engineer
- Adam Ayan – mastering at Gateway Mastering (Portland, Maine, USA)
- Lawrence Watson – photography
- Ritch Ames – sleeve design
