= Grace and Danger =

Studio album by John Martyn
- Released: October 13, 1980
- Recorded: Summer 1979
- Studio: DJM, London; Basing Street, London; Morgan, London
- Genre: Folk rock, folk jazz, jazz-rock, blue-eyed soul, reggae rock
- Length: 39:25
- Label: Island
- Producer: Martin Levan

John Martyn chronology
One World (1977)	Grace and Danger (1980)	Glorious Fool (1981)

Grace and Danger is the eighth studio album by John Martyn, released on October 13, 1980, by Island Records.

== Background ==
The album was written and recorded while John Martyn was in the process of divorcing his wife Beverley, and the songs strongly reflect the emotional upheaval that he was experiencing at the time. Phil Collins played drums and provided backing vocals. Martyn and Collins forged a close friendship during the writing and recording of the album, with both musicians going through painful divorces at the time – a strong kinship exists between Grace and Danger and Collins' contemporaneous album Face Value, which also contained a strong narrative relating to relationship breakdown. The release of the album was delayed by Island Records for well over a year because Chris Blackwell, the label owner (and friend of both John and Beverley) found the album too depressing. Producer Martin Levan said of the delay that "the messages I was getting back was that Chris [Blackwell] felt it was too sad and he didn't want to put it out. He felt it too depressing and didn't want it released." Speaking in 1981, Martyn captured his frustration at the situation, "I freaked: 'Please get it out! I don't give a damn how sad it makes you feel – It's what I'm about: direct communication of emotion.'"

The album cover was created by UK photographer/artist Sandy Porter.

Grace and Danger was released in a deluxe edition in February 2007, which featured the original album remastered, with a second CD of demos and offcuts.

== Reception ==
Professional ratings
Review scores
Source	Rating
AllMusic	4.5/5 stars
Encyclopedia of Popular Music	5/5 stars

When released, Rolling Stone described the album as "a very strong outing for John Martyn, placing him in a class with such intelligent eclectics as Joan Armatrading and Joni Mitchell." The BBC Scotland programme Scotland's Music, presented by Phil Cunningham included a performance of "Hurt In Your Heart" by Martyn during its November 2007 episode "Love & Loss". It was voted number 327 in Colin Larkin's All Time Top 1000 Albums third edition (2000). In the book he stated “Martyn shared the break-up of his marriage to Beverly with us, tearing open his heart and exposing all his emotions on record."

== Track listing ==
All tracks are written by John Martyn, except "Johnny Too Bad", written by Winston Bailey, Hylton Beckford, and Derrick Crooks with additional lyrics by Martyn, and "Our Love", co-written with Beverley Martyn.

Side one
No.	Title	Length
1.	"Some People Are Crazy"	4:20
2.	"Grace and Danger"	4:03
3.	"Lookin' On"	5:12
4.	"Johnny Too Bad"	3:57
Total length:		17:32

Side two
No.	Title	Length
1.	"Sweet Little Mystery"	5:28
2.	"Hurt In Your Heart"	4:59
3.	"Baby Please Come Home"	3:56
4.	"Save Some (For Me)"	3:34
5.	"Our Love"	3:57
Total length:		21:53

== Deluxe edition track listing ==
Disc 1

1. "Some People Are Crazy" – 4:19
2. "Grace and Danger" – 4:02
3. "Lookin' On" – 5:11
4. "Johnny Too Bad" – 3:56
5. "Sweet Little Mystery" – 5:28
6. "Hurt In Your Heart" – 4:58
7. "Baby Please Come Home" – 3:56
8. "Save Some (For Me)" – 3:34
9. "Our Love" – 3:57
10. "Sweet Little Mystery" (The Old Grey Whistle Test performance, 10/01/81) – 4:56
11. "Lookin' On" (Old Grey Whistle Test performance, 10/01/81) – 5:10
12. "Some People Are Crazy" (Rock Goes to College performance, 02/03/81) – 4:19
13. "Grace and Danger" (Rock Goes To College performance, 02/03/81) – 4:25
14. "Save Some (For Me)" (Rock Goes To College performance, 02/03/81) – 3:34

Disc 2

1. "Small Hat"
2. "Johnny Too Bad" (First version)
3. "Running Up The Harbour"
4. "Sweet Little Mystery" (First version)
5. "Dead On Arrival"
6. "Some People Are Crazy" (First version)
7. "Baby Please Come Home" (First version)
8. "Grace And Danger" (First version)
9. "Hurt In Your Heart" (Instrumental)
10. "After Tomorrow Night"
11. "Our Love" (First version)
12. "Lilo Blondino"
13. "Johnny Too Bad" (Dub mix)

Tracks 1–12 from CD2 recorded at Basing Street Studios, London, 29 March 1979. Tracks 4–6 were mixed there 4 June 1979. The rest 9 June 1979.

== Personnel ==
Original album

- John Martyn – guitar, vocals
- Tommy Eyre – keyboards, synthesizers
- John Giblin – bass
- Phil Collins – drums, backing vocals
- Dave Lawson – additional synthesizers on "Some People Are Crazy", "Sweet Little Mystery" and "Baby Please Come Home"

Other musicians, Deluxe Edition

- Alan Thomson – bass on Disc 1, tracks 10–14
- Danny Cummings – percussion on Disc 1, tracks 10–14
- Jeff Allen – drums on Disc 1, tracks 12–14

Technical

- Martin Levan – producer, engineer
- Mark Freegard – assistant engineer
- Bruno Tilley – design
- Sandy Porter – photography
