= Heaven and Earth (John Martyn album) =

Studio album by John Martyn
- Released: 16 May 2011
- Recorded: 2008–2009
- Studio: Woolengrange (Thomastown, Ireland): Doon The Cellar (Birkenhead, England); Parr Street Studios (Liverpool, England); Washoose (South Lanarkshire, Scotland); Butcher Boy (Chicago, Illinois, USA)
- Length: 52:23
- Label: Hole in the Rain Music Ltd.
- Producer: Jim Tullio: Garry Pollitt

John Martyn chronology
On the Cobbles (2004)	Heaven and Earth (2011)

Heaven and Earth is a posthumous studio album by John Martyn, completed by Gary Pollitt, released online on 16 May 2011. During recording the album was provisionally entitled Willing to Work.

== Track listing ==
All tracks composed by John Martyn except "Can't Turn Back The Years", a Phil Collins composition that originally appeared on his album Both Sides.

1. "Heel of the Hunt" - 5:38
2. "Stand Amazed" - 6:50
3. "Heaven and Earth" - 7:04
4. "Bad Company" - 4:35
5. "Could've Told You Before I Met You" - 5:08
6. "Gambler" - 5:17
7. "Can't Turn Back The Years" (Phil Collins) - 4:17
8. "Colour" - 5:30
9. "Willing to Work" - 8:04

== Personnel ==
- John Martyn – vocals, guitar
- Chris Cameron – Hammond organ, Fender Rhodes, Wurlitzer electric piano, clavinet, synthesizers
- Phil Collins – synthesizers, backing vocals (1, 7)
- Spencer Cozens – acoustic piano, synthesizers, steel drums
- Jim Tullio – synthesizers, atmospheric guitar
- Stefon "Bionik" Taylor – organ, synthesizers, electric guitar
- Garth Hudson – accordion
- Garry Pollitt – electric guitar
- Frank Usher – electric guitar
- Jim Weider – electric guitar
- John Giblin – acoustic bass
- Alan Thomson – bass
- Arran Ahmun – drums, percussion
- Suzi Chunk – percussion
- Gary "Spacey" Foote – baritone saxophone
- Martin Winning – saxophones, bass clarinet
- Nathan Bray – trumpet
- Rene Robinson – backing vocals
- Stevie Robinson – backing vocals
- Cheryl Wilson – backing vocals

=== Production ===
- Jim Snowden – executive producer
- Teresa Walsh – executive producer, photography
- Garry Pollitt – producer, engineer, mixing
- Jim Tullio – producer, additional engineer, mixing
- Spencer Cozens – additional production, additional engineer
- Stefon "Bionik" Taylor – additional production, additional engineer
- Andrea Wright – additional engineer
- Adam Ayan – mastering at Gateway Mastering (Portland, Maine, USA)
- Michael Page – art direction
- Reggie Hastings – cover artwork, concept
- Dylan Vaughan – photography
