= The Road to Ruin (John and Beverley Martyn album) =

Studio album by John and Beverley Martyn
- Released: November 1970
- Recorded: spring 1970
- Studios: Sound Techniques, Chelsea, London
- Genre: Folk rock
- Length: 42:18 (2005 reissue)
- Labels: UK Island: ILPS 9133; USA Warner Bros.: WS 1882
- Producer: Joe Boyd

John and Beverley Martyn chronology
Stormbringer! (1970)	The Road to Ruin (1970)	Bless the Weather (1971)

Professional ratings
Review scores
Source	Rating
AllMusic	3/5 stars
Mojo	4/5 stars
The Word	(favourable)

The Road to Ruin is a 1970 album released by husband and wife John and Beverley Martyn. It was the second (and last) album released as a duo, after which Island Records persuaded John Martyn to resume his solo career as they believed that the public were more interested in John as a solo artist rather than as part of a duo. The album marked the first collaboration on record between John and bassist Danny Thompson, who featured on many of Martyn's subsequent recordings.

The album's first track, "Primrose Hill", about the simple joys of domesticity, was written and sung by Beverley Martyn and featured Ray Warleigh on saxophone. It was extensively sampled by Fatboy Slim for the track "North West Three" from his 2004 album Palookaville.

== Track listing ==
All tracks composed by John Martyn except where indicated.

1. "Primrose Hill" (Beverley Martyn)
2. "Parcels"
3. "Auntie Aviator" (John & Beverley Martyn)
4. "New Day"
5. "Give Us a Ring" (Paul Wheeler)
6. "Sorry to Be So Long" (John & Beverley Martyn)
7. "Tree Green"
8. "Say What You Can" (John & Beverley Martyn) (titled "Let It Happen" on cover)
9. "Road to Ruin"

The remastered CD release includes the following previously unreleased track:

1. "Here I Am Now"

== Personnel ==
=== Musicians ===
- John Martyn - vocals, guitar, harmonica, keyboards
- Beverley Martyn - vocals, guitar
- Dudu Pukwana - saxophone on "Road to Ruin", "Sorry to Be So Long" and "Say What You Can"
- Lyn Dobson - flute on "New Day"; saxophone on "Say What You Can"
- Dave Pegg - bass on "Say What You Can"and "Give Us a Ring"
- Rocky Dzidzornu - congas
- Paul Harris - keyboards
- Wells Kelly - drums on all tracks, except "Auntie Aviator"; bass on "Auntie Aviator"
- Mike Kowalski - drums on "Auntie Aviator"
- Alan Spenner - bass on "Primrose Hill", "Road to Ruin" and "Sorry to Be So Long"
- Ray Warleigh - saxophone on "Primrose Hill"
- Danny Thompson - double bass on "New Day"

Arrangement for "Say What You Can" by Tony Cox. All other arrangements by John Martyn and Paul Harris.

=== Technical ===
- John Wood - engineer
- Nigel Waymouth - design, photography
- Max Ernst - front cover engraving (from "Une Semaine De Bonté")
