= Lewisham Academy of Music =

Coordinates: 51°28′37.6″N 0°1′42.3″W

The Lewisham Academy of Music was a walk-in music academy which operated in London from 1980 to 2000.

== History ==
The Academy was established by music teacher, Bruce Cole and Jack Balchin, musical instigator in 1980 as a resource centre for young people in South East London. Marion Fudger joined staff soon after beginning. Fitzroy King became involved as a staff member on a voluntary basis with his connections to the local black community. John Hunt and Denise --- were the first members of the academy. Youth and community music organisation Community Music (CM) (founded by Dave O'Donnell and John Stevens (drummer)) held regular music workshops there during the 1980s.

== Campus ==
It was located in the old coroners court and morgue in Watson Street in Deptford, South-East London. The Lewisham Academy of Music evolved through the early days and developed the class rooms as money allowed. Money in the early days came from The Combination at the Albany Empire that umbrellered the project to start the ball rolling. Funding was then pursued with aid from the Albany and a council of management that was established for guidance for the project once it was proven of value to the community. The premises were eventually taken over by The Midi Music Company after the collapse of funding sources brought the life of the Academy to an end.

== Notable alumni ==
The Academy includes M People percussionist Shovell as one of its alumni (he is also a patron of the Midi Music Company) and television composer Jeffrey Scott Pearson.
