= Sunday's Child =

Studio album by John Martyn
- Released: 28 January 1975
- Recorded: August 1974
- Studio: Island (London)
- Genre: Folk rock
- Length: 38:40
- Label: Island
- Producer: John Martyn

John Martyn chronology
Inside Out (1973)	Sunday's Child (1975)	One World (1977)

Professional ratings
Review scores
Source	Rating
Allmusic	4/5 stars
Record Collector	3/5 stars

Sunday's Child is a John Martyn album released in 1975. John Martyn's follow-up to 1973's Inside Out is a more song-oriented, less experimental album. His eighth record, including two with his wife Beverley Martyn, shows the many facets of Martyn's playing, from his effects-driven electric guitar to his acoustic work. This album contains a collection of original songs along with a pair of covers: the traditional British ballad "Spencer the Rover", and the country standard "Satisfied Mind". The song "The Message" features a pair of verses written by Martyn sung in his typical style, alternating with a pair of verses from the Scottish folk ballad "Mairi's Wedding" sung with a Scottish lilt.

== Track listing ==
All tracks composed and arranged by John Martyn except where indicated

1. "One Day Without You"
2. "Lay It All Down"
3. "Root Love"
4. "My Baby Girl"
5. "Sunday's Child"
6. "Spencer the Rover" (Traditional; arranged by John Martyn)
7. "Clutches"
8. "The Message"
9. "Satisfied Mind" (Red Hayes, Jack Rhodes; falsely credited as Traditional, arranged by John Martyn)
10. "You Can Discover"
11. "Call Me Crazy"

=== Bonus tracks ===
1. "Ellie Rhee" (outtake)
2. "A Satisfied Mind" (first mix)
3. "One Day Without You" (live)
4. "You Can Discover" (live)
5. "My Baby Girl" (live)
6. "The Message" (live)
7. "Spencer The Rover" (live)

Bonus tracks 3–7 recorded 7 January 1975 for John Peel session. John Martyn solo, with guitar.

== Personnel ==
- John Martyn – vocals, guitar, Moog synthesiser, clavinet
- Danny Thompson – double bass
- Liam Genockey – drums
- Al Anderson – bass on "One Day Without You"
- John Bundrick – piano on "My Baby Girl"
- Beverley Martyn – backing vocals on "My Baby Girl"
- Terry Wilson – bass on "Clutches"
- Tony Braunagel – drums on "Clutches"
- Keshav Sathe – tabla on "Call me crazy"

Technical

- Richard Digby Smith – engineer
- Dick Cuthell – technician
- Visualeyes – photography
