= Solid Air =

Studio album by John Martyn
- Released: February 1973
- Recorded: November–December 1972
- Studios: Island (London); Sound Techniques (London)
- Genres: Folk rock; folk jazz; folk; psychedelia
- Length: 34:44
- Label: Island
- Producers: John Martyn; John Wood

John Martyn chronology
Bless the Weather (1971)	Solid Air (1973)	Inside Out (1973)

Solid Air is the fourth studio album by the British singer-songwriter John Martyn, released in February 1973 by Island Records.

== Recording ==
The album was recorded over eight days and features instrumental contributions by bassist Danny Thompson and members of Fairport Convention.

== Tracks background ==
"Solid Air", the title track, was dedicated to a friend of Martyn's, Nick Drake, who would die of an antidepressant overdose 18 months after the album was released. Martyn said of the track "It was done for a friend of mine, and it was done right with very clear motives, and I'm very pleased with it, for varying reasons. It has got a very simple message, but you'll have to work that one out for yourself."

The album features an avant-garde cover of Skip James' "Devil Got My Woman", here retitled "I'd Rather Be the Devil" and performed with heavy use of Martyn's Echoplex tape delay effect.

"May You Never" became something of a signature song for Martyn, becoming a staple of his live performances. Released in November 1971 as a single in an early form, the song was re-recorded during the Solid Air sessions. Eric Clapton covered "May You Never" on his 1977 album Slowhand.

== Album cover ==
The album cover is an example of schlieren photography demonstrating the 'solid' nature of air.

== Later reissues and performances ==
A remastered CD was issued by Universal Records in October 2000. This CD was packaged in a card slipcase, and featured a remastered version of the original album with the addition of a live version of "I'd Rather Be The Devil". Solid Air was given a further remastering and repackaging when a double CD deluxe edition (curated by John Hillarby) was released in 2009, and which included several alternate studio and live versions.

In 2006, Martyn performed the album live in its entirety as part of the All Tomorrow's Parties-curated Don't Look Back series and subsequently toured the UK.

== Reception ==
Professional ratings
Retrospective reviews
Review scores
Source	Rating
AllMusic	5/5 stars
American Songwriter	5/5 stars
Encyclopedia of Popular Music	5/5 stars
Pitchfork	10/10
Sputnikmusic	4.5/5 stars

Contemporary reviews were favourable, with music weekly Sounds declaring that "Solid Air flows beautifully and shows the entire spectrum of music that John Martyn has at his fingertips." In a retrospective review, American Songwriter described the album as "timeless" and stated that "audacious, hypnotic and groundbreaking only begins to describe Martyn's still unique combination of folk, jazz, blues and space rock, wrapped around riveting, unforgettable melodies." AllMusic called Solid Air "one of the defining moments of British folk" and noted its genre-blending. BBC Music stated that "it's a classic with not a note out of place.. And ably assisted by John Wood's late night production it's now firmly esconced in the hearts of chillers, smokers and music lovers the world over."

Solid Air was rated as the 67th Greatest British Album Ever by the British music magazine Q, and was also included in their list of Best Chill-Out Albums Of All Time. The album is included in the book 1001 Albums You Must Hear Before You Die by Robert Dimery. It was voted number 826 in Colin Larkin's All Time Top 1000 Albums 3rd Edition (2000).

== Track listing ==
All tracks written by John Martyn except where noted.

Side one

1. "Solid Air" – 5:45
2. "Over the Hill" – 2:53
3. "Don't Want to Know" – 3:02
4. "I'd Rather Be the Devil" (Skip James) – 6:18

Side two

1. "Go Down Easy" – 3:35
2. "Dreams by the Sea" – 3:17
3. "May You Never" – 3:41
4. "The Man in the Station" – 2:53
5. "The Easy Blues" – 3:20
- Note: On the original 1987 CD release of the album, the final track "The Easy Blues" was split into two separate tracks, "Jelly Roll Blues" (2:15) and "Gentle Blues" (1:07). The 2000 remastered reissue lists the track as "The Easy Blues (Jelly Roll Blues/Gentle Blues)", and the 2009 deluxe edition lists it as "The Easy Blues/Gentle Blues".

=== 2000 remastered reissue bonus track ===
10. "I'd Rather Be the Devil" (live) (Skip James) – 6:11

=== 2009 Deluxe Edition ===
Disc 1

As original album.

Disc 2

1. "Solid Air" (alternative take) – 5:48
2. "Over the Hill" (alternative take) – 3:28
3. "Don't Want to Know" (alternative take) – 3:26
4. "I'd Rather Be the Devil" (alternative take) (Skip James) – 7:39
5. "Go Down Easy" (alternative take) – 4:55
6. "Dreams by the Sea" (alternative take) – 3:22
7. "May You Never" (alternative take) – 3:33
8. "The Man in the Station" (alternative take) – 5:32
9. "The Easy Blues/Gentle Blues" (alternative take) – 4:49
10. "Keep On" – 4:57
11. "When It's Dark" – 8:36
12. "In the Evening" – 4:04
13. "May You Never" (single version) – 2:43
14. "The Easy Blues" (live) – 3:24
15. "May You Never" (live) – 3:39
16. "I'd Rather Be the Devil" (live) (Skip James) – 8:33

== Personnel ==
- John Martyn – vocals, acoustic and electric guitar; keyboards on "The Easy Blues"
- Richard Thompson – mandolin on "Over the Hill"
- Simon Nicol – autoharp on "Over the Hill"
- Sue Draheim – violin on "Over the Hill"
- Tony Coe – saxophone on "Dreams by the Sea" and "Solid Air"
- John "Rabbit" Bundrick – acoustic and electric piano, organ, clavinet
- Tristan Fry – vibraphone on "Solid Air"
- Danny Thompson – acoustic bass
- Dave Pegg – bass
- Dave Mattacks – drums
- Neemoi "Speedy" Acquaye – congas

=== Technical ===
- John Wood – engineer
- Fabio Nicoli – sleeve design
- John Webster – front cover photography

== Charts ==
Chart performance for Solid Air
Chart (2026)	Peak position
Greek Albums (IFPI)	35
