= Stormbringer! =

Studio album by John and Beverley Martyn
- Released: February 1970
- Recorded: Summer 1969, Woodstock, USA
- Genre: British folk rock
- Length: 55:15 (2005 reissue)
- Labels: UK: Island; USA: Warner Bros.
- Producer: Joe Boyd

John and Beverley Martyn chronology
The Tumbler (1968)	Stormbringer! (1970)	The Road to Ruin (1970)

Professional ratings
Review scores
Source	Rating
Allmusic	3/5 stars
Mojo	3/5 stars
The Word	(favourable)

Stormbringer! is a 1970 album released by John and Beverley Martyn. It has no connection to Michael Moorcock's 1965 Elric novel of the same name. John Martyn wrote six of the ten songs and Beverley four. The album was recorded under the direction of Paul Harris in Woodstock, New York.

Two of the tracks feature the drumming of Levon Helm of the Band, who were an influence on John Martyn's music.

== Track listing ==
All tracks composed by John Martyn except where indicated.

1. "Go Out and Get It"
2. "Can't Get the One I Want" (Beverley Martyn)
3. "Stormbringer"
4. "Sweet Honesty" (Beverley Martyn)
5. "Woodstock"
6. "John the Baptist"
7. "The Ocean" (Beverley Martyn)
8. "Traffic-Light Lady"
9. "Tomorrow Time" (Beverley Martyn)
10. "Would You Believe Me?"

The remastered CD issue contained the following previously unreleased tracks:

1. "One of Those Days"
2. "I Don't Know"
3. "John the Baptist"
4. "Traffic-Light Lady"

The bonus tracks were recorded during a demo session at Sound Techniques Studios, Chelsea on 16 April 1969

== Personnel ==
- John Martyn - vocals, acoustic guitar, electric guitar
- Beverley Martyn - vocals, acoustic guitar
- Harvey Brooks - bass
- Paul Harris - piano, organ, musical direction, arrangements
- John Simon - harpsichord on "Tomorrow Time"
- Levon Helm - drums on "Sweet Honesty" and "John The Baptist"
- Herbie Lovelle - drums on "Stormbringer!" and "Would You Believe Me"
- Billy Mundi - drums on "Go Out and Get It"

Technical

- John Wood - engineer
- Nigel Waymouth - front cover design
- Hiroshi - photography
