= Cooltide =

Studio album by John Martyn
- Released: 1991
- Genre: Rock
- Length: 51:58
- Label: Permanent Records
- Producers: John Martyn: Brian Young; Spencer Cozens

John Martyn chronology
The Apprentice (1990)	Cooltide (1991)	And (1996)

Cooltide is an album by John Martyn. Recorded at CaVa Sound Workshops, Glasgow, Scotland. Originally released on CD by Permanent Records, catalogue number PERM CD 4. The album marks the handover by longtime Martyn keyboard collaborator Foster Patterson to his successor Spencer Cozens. Cozens had to sit his college final examinations during the recording, and Patterson returned to deputise in his absence.

== Track listing ==
All tracks composed by John Martyn except where indicated.

1. "Hole In The Rain" - 4:38
2. "Annie Says" - 4:58
3. "Jack The Lad" - 6:39
4. "Number Nine" - 3:36
5. "The Cure" - 4:13
6. "Same Difference" - 4:21
7. "Father Time" - 5:34
8. "Call Me" - 5:36
9. "Cooltide" - 12:23

== Personnel ==
(as listed on original CD release)

- John Martyn – vocals, guitars
- Spencer Cozens – keyboards, synth bass
- Foster Patterson – keyboards
- Dave Ball – bass (4)
- Alan Thomson – bass (6, 8)
- John Henderson – drums (1–3, 5–9)
- Arran Ahmun – drums (4)
- Miles Bould – percussion
- Joe Locke – vibraphone
- Andy Sheppard – soprano saxophone
- Jessica King – backing vocals (6)

=== Production ===
- John Martyn – producer
- Spencer Cozens – producer
- Brian Young – producer, engineer, mixing
- Tony Doogan – assistant engineer, mixing
- Douglas McKechnie – cover artwork
