= Ain't No Saint =

Compilation album by John Martyn
- Released: September 2008
- Genres: Folk, blues
- Label: Island

Professional ratings
Review scores
Source	Rating
Allmusic	4.5/5 stars
The Guardian	4/5 stars
The Independent	favourable
Mojo	4/5 stars
Rolling Stone	(No Rating)
Uncut	4/5 stars

Ain't No Saint is a career-spanning retrospective of folk musician John Martyn, released on the eve of the singer's 60th birthday in 2008.

The four-CD compilation album was compiled by John Hillarby, and is divided into two 'studio' discs and two 'live' discs. Hillarby selected at least one song from each of Martyn's 22 albums, along with rarities and outtakes, and added over 30 unreleased pieces.

== Track listing ==
1. "Fairy Tale Lullaby" (John Martyn) – 2:51
2. "Sing a Song of Summer" (Martyn) – 2:19
3. "Stormbringer" (Martyn) – 4:17
4. "Tree Green" (Martyn) – 3:10
5. "Head and Heart" (Martyn) – 4:52
6. "In the Evening" (Martyn) – 4:06
7. "Solid Air" (Martyn) – 5:47
8. "Keep On" (Martyn) – 4:58
9. "The Glory of Love" (Billy Hill, Martyn) – 2:16
10. "Go Down Easy" (Martyn) – 3:37
11. "Ain't No Saint" [instrumental] (Martyn) – 5:55
12. "Fine Lines" (Martyn) – 3:49
13. "Eight More Miles" (Martyn) – 2:03
14. "Call Me Crazy" (Martyn) – 7:26
15. "Black Man at Your Shoulder" (Martyn) – 7:22
16. "All for the Love of You" (Martyn) – 5:05
17. "Working It Out" (Martyn) – 2:44
18. "Couldn't Love You More" (Martyn) – 3:05
19. "Advertisement" (Martyn) – 0:34
20. "Small Hours" [instrumental] Martyn 10:20
21. "Anna" (Martyn) – 4:13
22. "Lookin' On" (Martyn) – 5:16
23. "Amsterdam" (Martyn) – 5:29
24. "Hung Up" (Martyn) – 4:00
25. "Acid Rain" (Martyn, Alan Thomson) – 4:12
26. "Who Believes in Angels" (Martyn) – 4:57
27. "The Apprentice" (Martyn) – 4:22
28. "Hole in the Rain" (Martyn) – 4:40
29. "One World" (Martyn) – 6:27
30. "Sunday's Child" (Martyn) – 6:12
31. "Carmine" (Martyn) – 5:29
32. "The Sky Is Crying" (Elmore James, Clarence L. Lewis, Morgan Robinson) – 4:01
33. "So Sweet" (Martyn) – 4:50
34. "Back to Marseilles" (Martyn) – 4:20
35. "Bless the Weather" [live] (Martyn) – 11:49
36. "Make No Mistake" [live] (Martyn) – 5:16
37. "So Much in Love with You" [live/#] Martyn 5:55
38. "Spencer the Rover" [live] (Martyn, Traditional) – 4:07
39. "My Baby Girl" [live] (Martyn) – 2:48
40. "You Can Discover" [live] (Martyn) – 5:15
41. "Solid Air" [live] (Martyn) – 7:00
42. "I'd Rather Be the Devil (Devil Got My Woman)" [live] (James) – 8:55
43. "Outside In" [live] (Martyn) – 13:09
44. "Advertisement" [live] (Martyn) – 0:17
45. "Big Muff" [live] (Martyn) – 9:32
46. "One Day Without You" [live] (Martyn) – 3:27
47. "Dealer" [live] (Martyn) – 7:14
48. "Smiling Stranger" [live] (Martyn) – 7:44
49. "Johnny Too Bad" [live] (Hylton Beckford, Derrick Leapold Crooks, Shadow Wilson, Delroy Wilson) – 3:56
50. "Hurt in Your Heart" [live] (Martyn) – 6:49
51. "John Wayne" [live] (Martyn) – 6:37
52. "Angeline" [live] (Martyn) – 5:21
53. "Mad Dog Days" [live] (Martyn) – 5:12
54. "The Moment" [live] (Martyn) – 4:16
55. "Fisherman's Dream" [live] (Martyn) – 5:06
56. "Sweet Little Mystery" [live] (Martyn) – 5:55
57. "May You Never" [live]" (Martyn) – 5:37
58. "Step It Up" [live]" (Martyn) – 3:47
59. "Sunshine's Better" [live] (Martyn) – 5:05
60. "One for the Road" (Martyn) – 3:28
61. "Over the Hill" [live] (Martyn) – 3:27

== Personnel ==
- Arran Ahmun – drums
- Spencer Cozens – piano
- John Paul "J.P." Jones – mandolin
- John Martyn – guitar
- Alan Thomson – bass
- Martin Winning – saxophone

=== Production ===
- Joe Black – project coordinator
- Paschal Byrne – mastering
- Daryl Easlea – liner notes, sleeve notes
- John Hillarby – liner notes, compilation, tape research
- Kenny Mathieson – photography
- Barry Plummer – photography
- Phil Smee – design
- Shamil Tanna – cover photo
