= Industry (Richard Thompson and Danny Thompson album) =

Studio album by Richard Thompson and Danny Thompson
- Released: May 12, 1997
- Recorded: 1997, Livingston Studios, London
- Genre: Rock
- Length: 44:01
- Label: Hannibal
- Producer: Richard Thompson and Danny Thompson

Professional ratings
Review scores
Source	Rating
AllMusic	3/5 stars
Uncut	3/5 stars

Industry is an album by Richard Thompson and Danny Thompson released in 1997.

The two unrelated Thompsons had known each other since the late sixties, and had toured together throughout the nineties. This long-planned collaborative work was finally recorded in 1997.

The compositions on the album - both Richard Thompson's songs and Danny Thompson's instrumental pieces - portray various impressions of the impact of industry on England, ranging from the birth of the Industrial Revolution to the closing of the Grimethorpe Colliery and the effects of unemployment. "Sweetheart on the Barricade" features Danny Thompson's uncles Albert and Harold Thompson, who held factory jobs and played in brass bands.

== Track listing ==
1. "Chorale" (Danny Thompson)
2. "Sweetheart On The Barricade" (Richard Thompson)
3. "Children Of The Dark" (Danny Thompson)
4. "Big Chimney" (Richard Thompson)
5. "Kitty 'Tommy, quick! I can hear clogs going up the street.' Tommy 'Well stick mine out and see if they'll go with 'em!'" (Danny Thompson)
6. "Drifting Through The Days" (Richard Thompson)
7. "Lotteryland" (Richard Thompson)
8. "Pitfalls" (Danny Thompson)
9. "Saboteur" (Richard Thompson)
10. "New Rhythms" (Danny Thompson)
11. "Last Shift" (Richard Thompson)

== Personnel ==
- Richard Thompson: guitar, vocals, acoustic guitar (05)
- Danny Thompson: double bass, bass trombone (02), col legno (09)
- Paul Clarvis: percussion (01, 10), drums (10)
- Christine Collister : vocals (02, 04, 07)
- Paul Dunmall: soprano saxophone (01, 02, 03, 05, 06, 08, 10), tenor saxophone (04-second solo)
- Dylan Fowler: rhythm guitar (02), cor anglais (01, 10, 11), acoustic guitar (03, 08, 10), electric guitar (05-solo, 10), oboe (06, 10, 11)
- Peter Knight: violin (01, 02, 03, 05, 06, 08, 10, 11)
- Dave Mattacks: drums (02, 04)
- Tony Roberts: tenor saxophone (01, 02, 04-first solo, 05, 06, 08-solo, 10), harmonium (02), flute (02, 03), border pipes (01, 10), Northumbrian pipes (10), bass clarinet (02, 11), baritone saxophone (04), alto flute (11)
- Albert Thompson: first tenor trombone (02)
- Harold Thompson: second tenor trombone (02)
