= John Martyn =

British musician (1948–2009)

John Martyn OBE
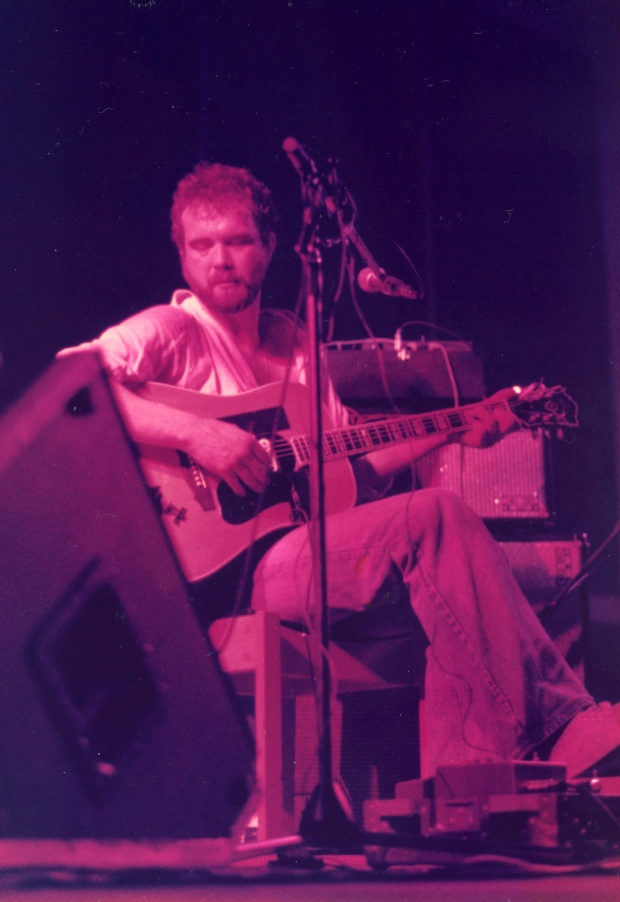
- Martyn in 1978

Background information
- Born: Iain David McGeachy; 11 September 1948; New Malden, Greater London, England
- Died: 29 January 2009 (aged 60) Thomastown, Ireland
- Genres: Folk; jazz; rock; blues
- Occupations: Musician; songwriter
- Instruments: Guitar; vocals
- Years active: 1967–2009
- Labels: Island; WEA
- Partner(s): Beverley Martyn (m. 1969; div. 1980) Annie Furlong (m. 1996) Theresa Walsh (m. 1999–2009)
- Website: johnmartyn.com

Iain David McGeachy (11 September 1948 – 29 January 2009), known professionally as John Martyn, was a British singer-songwriter and guitarist. Over a 40-year career, he released 23 studio albums and received frequent critical acclaim. The Times described him as "an electrifying guitarist and singer whose music blurred the boundaries between folk, jazz, rock and blues".

Martyn began his career at age 17 as a key member of the Scottish folk music scene, drawing inspiration from American blues and English traditional music, and signed with Island Records. By the 1970s he had begun incorporating jazz and rock into his sound on albums such as Solid Air (1973) and One World (1977), as well as experimenting with guitar effects and tape delay machines like the Echoplex. Domestic and substance abuse problems marked his personal life throughout the 1970s and 1980s, though he continued to release albums while collaborating with figures such as Phil Collins and Lee "Scratch" Perry. He remained active until his death in 2009.

== Early life and education ==
Martyn was born Iain David McGeachy at Beechcroft Avenue, New Malden, Surrey on 11 September 1948, to Belgian-Jewish mother Beatrice "Betty" Ethel (née Jewitt) and Greenock-born Scottish father Thomas Paterson "Tommy" McGeachy. His parents, both opera singers, divorced when he was five and he spent his childhood alternating between Scotland and England. Most of this time was spent in the care of his father and grandmother, Janet, in Shawlands, Glasgow, part of his holidays each year spent on his mother's houseboat. He adapted his accent depending on context or company, changing between broad or refined Glaswegian and southern English accents, and continued to do so throughout his life. He attended Shawlands Academy in Glasgow. At school, he was a keen rugby player. On leaving school he attended Glasgow School of Art, but left to pursue his musical aspirations.

== Career ==
=== 1960s and 1970s ===
Mentored by Hamish Imlach, Martyn began his professional musical career when he was 17, playing a fusion of blues and folk resulting in a distinctive style which made him a key figure in the British folk scene during the mid-1960s. He signed to Chris Blackwell's Island Records in 1967 and released his first album, London Conversation, the same year. Released in 1968, his second album, The Tumbler, was moving towards jazz.

"Eibhli Ghail Chiuin Ni Chearbhail"
"Eibhli Ghail Chiuin Ni Chearbhail" (1973), built around a traditional tune, was featured on Inside Out. It typifies Martyn's unique use of the echoplex effect, coupled with a fuzzbox and phase-shifter.

By 1970 Martyn had developed a wholly original and idiosyncratic sound: acoustic guitar run through a fuzzbox, phase shifter and Echoplex. This sound was first apparent on Stormbringer!, released in February 1970.

Stormbringer! was written and performed by Martyn and his then-wife Beverley Martyn, who had previously recorded solo as Beverley Kutner. Their second duo album, The Road to Ruin, was released in November 1970. Island Records felt that it would be more successful to market Martyn as a solo act and this was how subsequent albums were produced, although Beverley continued to make appearances as a backing singer as well as continuing as a solo artist herself.

Released in 1971, Bless the Weather was Martyn's third solo album. In February 1973, Martyn released the album Solid Air, the title song a tribute to the singer-songwriter Nick Drake, a close friend and label-mate who would die in 1974 from an overdose of antidepressants. In 2009, a double CD Deluxe edition of Solid Air was released featuring unreleased songs and out-takes, and sleeve notes by Record Collector's Daryl Easlea. On Bless the Weather and on Solid Air Martyn collaborated with jazz bassist Danny Thompson, with whom he proceeded to have a musical partnership which continued until his death.

Following the commercial success of Solid Air, later on in 1973 Martyn quickly recorded and released the experimental Inside Out, an album with emphasis placed on feel and improvisation rather than song structure. In 1975, he followed this with Sunday's Child, a more song-based collection that includes "My Baby Girl" and "Spencer the Rover", which are references to his young family. Martyn subsequently described this period as 'very happy'. In September 1975, he released a live album, Live at Leeds — Martyn had been unable to persuade Island to release the record, and resorted to selling individually signed copies by mail from his home in Hastings. Live at Leeds features Danny Thompson and drummer John Stevens. In 2010, a 2CD Deluxe version of Live at Leeds was released, and it was discovered that not all of the songs on the original album were from the Leeds concert. After releasing Live at Leeds, Martyn took a sabbatical, including a visit to Jamaica, spending time with reggae producer Lee "Scratch" Perry.

In 1977, he released One World, which led some commentators to describe Martyn as the "Father of Trip-Hop". It included tracks such as "Small Hours" and "Big Muff", a collaboration with Lee "Scratch" Perry. "Small Hours" was recorded outside; the microphones picked up ambient sounds, such as geese from a nearby lake. In 1978, he played guitar on the album Harmony of the Spheres by Neil Ardley.

=== 1980s ===
Martyn's marriage broke down at the end of the 1970s and "John hit the self destruct button" (although other biographers, including The Times obituary writer, attribute the break-up of his marriage to his already being addicted to alcohol and drugs). In her autobiography, Beverley described protracted domestic violence. Out of this period, described by Martyn as "a very dark period in my life", came the album Grace and Danger. Released in October 1980, the album had been held up for well over a year by Chris Blackwell. He was a close friend of John and Beverley, and found the album too openly disturbing to release. Only after intense and sustained pressure from Martyn did Blackwell agree to release the album. Commenting on that period, Martyn said, "I was in a dreadful emotional state over that record. I was hardly in control of my own actions. The reason they finally released it was because I freaked: Please get it out! I don't give a damn about how sad it makes you feel—it's what I'm about: the direct communication of emotion. Grace and Danger was very cathartic, and it really hurt."

In the late 1980s, Martyn cited Grace and Danger as his favourite album, and said that it was "probably the most specific piece of autobiography I've written. Some people keep diaries, I make records." The album has since become one of his highest-regarded, prompting a deluxe double-disc reissue in 2007, containing the original album remastered and including b-sides, outtakes and other rarities related to the album sessions.

Phil Collins played drums and sang backing vocals on Grace and Danger and subsequently played drums on and produced Martyn's next album, Glorious Fool, in 1981. Martyn left Island records in 1981, and recorded Glorious Fool and Well Kept Secret for WEA achieving his first Top 30 album. In 1983 Martyn released a live album, Philentropy, and married Annie Furlong but the couple, who had lived in Scotland, later separated. Returning to Island records, he recorded Sapphire (1984), Piece by Piece (1986) and the live Foundations (1987) before leaving the label in 1988.

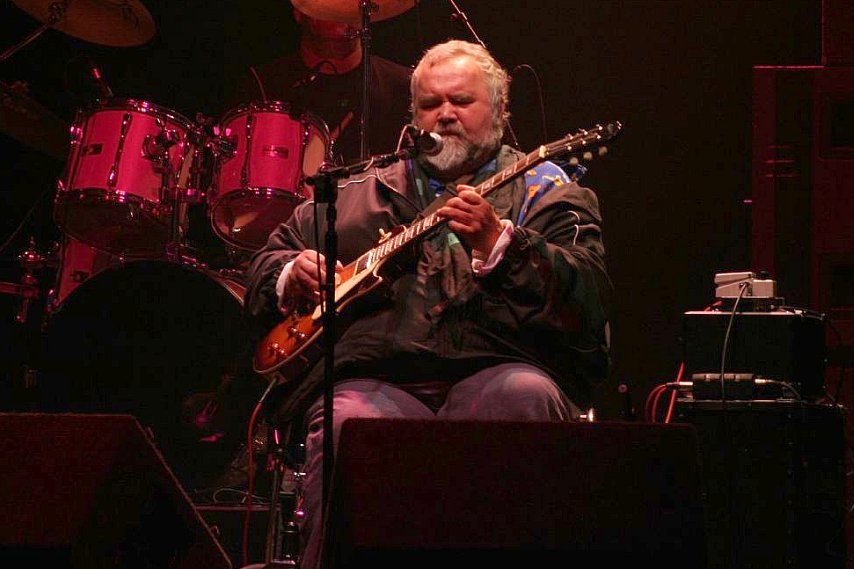
Martyn in 2006

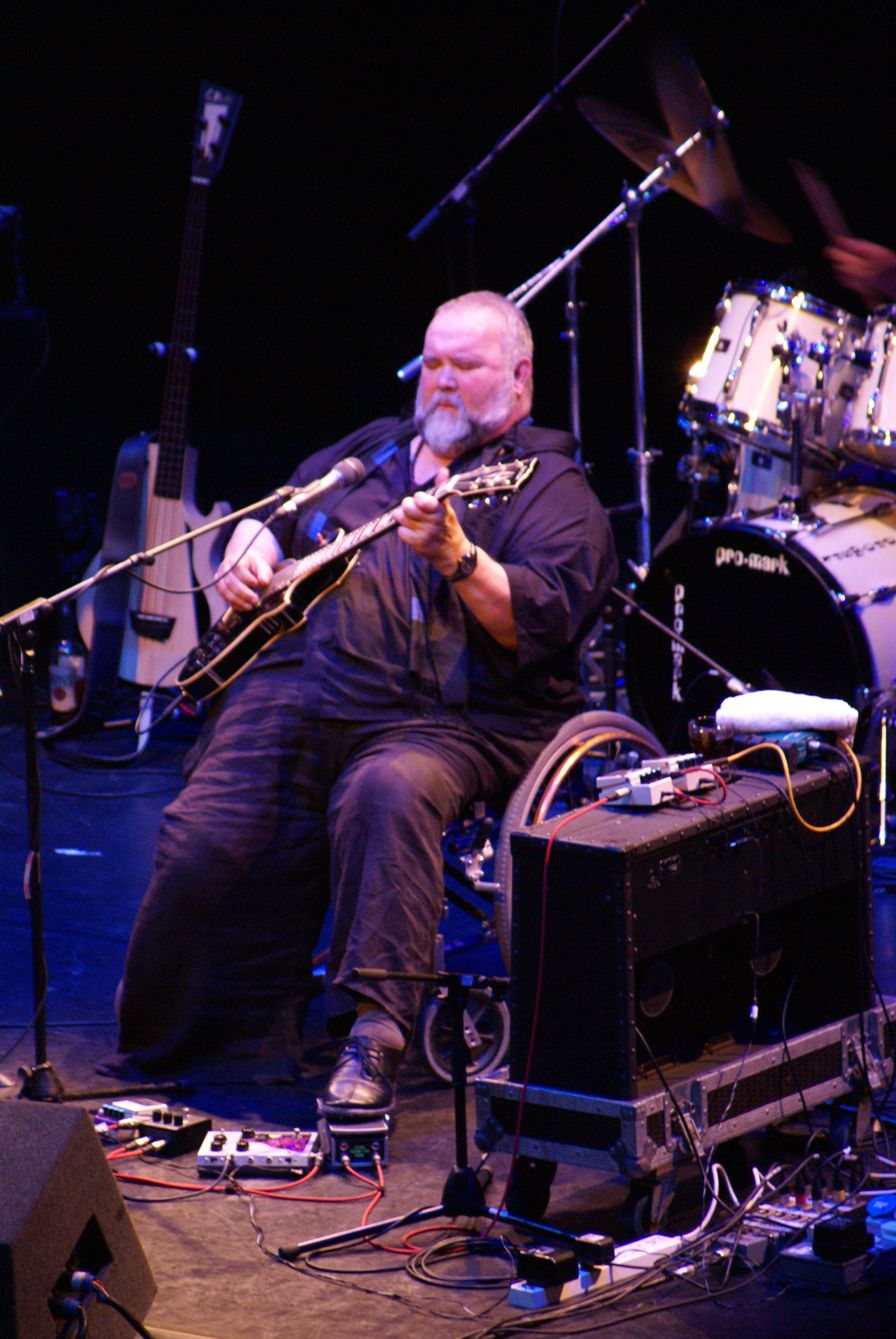
Martyn performing at the Barbican Centre in London, 2008

=== 1990s and 2000s ===
Martyn released The Apprentice in 1990 and Cooltide in 1991 for Permanent Records, and reunited with Phil Collins for No Little Boy (1993), which featured rerecorded versions of some of his classic tracks. The similar 1992 release Couldn't Love You More was unauthorised and disowned by Martyn. Material from these recordings and his two Permanent albums have been recycled on many releases. Permanent Records also released a live 2-CD set titled Live in 1994. And (1996) came out on Go! Discs and saw Martyn draw heavily on trip-hop textures, a direction which saw more complete expression on 2000's Glasgow Walker. The Church with One Bell (1998) is a covers album of blues classics, which draws on songs by other artists, including Portishead and Ben Harper. In 2001, Martyn appeared on the track "Deliver Me" by Faithless keyboard player and DJ Sister Bliss.

In July 2006, the documentary Johnny Too Bad was screened by the BBC. The programme documented the period surrounding the operation to amputate Martyn's right leg below the knee (the result of a burst cyst that had led to septicaemia) and the writing and recording of On the Cobbles (2004), an album described by Peter Marsh on the BBC Music website as "the strongest, most consistent set he's come up with in years." Much of Cobbles was a revisiting of his acoustic-based sound. Martyn's last concerts were in November 2008, reprising Grace and Danger.

In collaboration with his keyboard player Spenser Cozens, Martyn wrote and performed the score for Strangebrew (Robert Wallace, 2007), which won the Fortean Times Award at the London Short Film Festival in the same year. The film concept being a strong influence of the album design of Martyn's Heaven and Earth (2011). On 4 February 2008, Martyn received the lifetime achievement award at the BBC Radio 2 Folk Awards. The award was presented by his friend Phil Collins. The BBC website stated Martyn's "heartfelt performances have either suggested or fully demonstrated an idiosyncratic genius." Eric Clapton was quoted saying that Martyn was "so far ahead of everything, it's almost inconceivable."

To mark Martyn's 60th birthday, Island released a 4 CD boxed set, Ain't No Saint, on 1 September 2008. The set includes unreleased studio material and rare live recordings.

Martyn was appointed OBE in the 2009 New Year Honours and died a few weeks later. His partner Theresa Walsh collected the award at Buckingham Palace. Martyn had recorded new material before he died and his final studio album, Heaven and Earth, was completed and released posthumously in May 2011. The sleeve note says, "all the tracks on this recording were kept as John wished — in their entirety".

== Death ==
Martyn died on 29 January 2009, at a hospital in Thomastown, County Kilkenny, Ireland, from acute respiratory distress syndrome. Martyn's health was affected by his life-long use of drugs and alcohol. He was survived by his partner of 10 years, Theresa Walsh, his children with Beverley Martyn, Mhairi and Spenser, and stepson, Beverley’s son Wesley.

=== Tributes ===
Following Martyn's death, Rolling Stone lauded his "progressive folk invention and improvising sorcery". Phil Collins paid tribute to him, saying, "John's passing is terribly, terribly sad. I had worked with and known him since the late 1970s and he was a great friend. He was uncompromising, which made him infuriating to some people, but he was unique and we'll never see the likes of him again. I loved him dearly and will miss him very much."

Mike Harding introduced an hour-long tribute to Martyn in his BBC Radio 2 programme on 25 February 2009. A tribute album, Johnny Boy Would Love This, was released on 15 August 2011, comprising cover versions of his songs by various artists.

The "Grace & Danger: A Celebration of John Martyn" tribute concert held on 27 January 2019 at Glasgow Royal Concert Hall marked the tenth anniversary of his passing. Curated and hosted by Danny Thompson, artists including Eddi Reader, Eric Bibb and Paul Weller performed "to do full justice to a selection of Martyn's finest songs and channel some of the great man's spirit".

On 19 April 2025 his song "May You Never" was featured in an episode of the BBC Radio 4 series Soul Music.

== Discography ==
=== Studio albums ===
Year	Album	Peak chart positions
Year	Album	UK
1967	London Conversation: Released: October 1967; Label: Island (ILP 952)	-
1968	The Tumbler: Released: December 1968; Label: Island (ILPS 9091)	-
1970	Stormbringer! (with Beverley Martyn): Released: February 1970; Label: Island (ILPS 9113)	-
1970	The Road to Ruin (with Beverley Martyn): Released: November 1970; Label: Island (ILPS 9133)	-
1971	Bless the Weather: Released: November 1971; Label: Island (ILPS 9167)	-
1973	Solid Air: Released: February 1973; Label: Island (ILPS 9226)	-
1973	Inside Out: Released: October 1973; Label: Island (ILPS 9253)	-
1975	Sunday's Child: Released: 28 January 1975; Label: Island (ILPS 9296)	-
1977	One World: Released: 4 November 1977; Label: Island (ILPS/ZCI 9492)	54
1980	Grace and Danger: Released: 13 October 1980; Label: Island (ILPS/ZCI 9560)	54
1981	Glorious Fool: Released: September 1981; Label: WEA (WEA K/K4 99178)	25
1982	Well Kept Secret: Released: August 1982; Label: WEA (WEA K/K4 99255)	20
1984	Sapphire: Released: November 1984; Label: Island (ILPS/ICT 9779)	57
1986	Piece by Piece: Released: February 1986; Label: Island (ILPS/ICTCID 9807)	28
1990	The Apprentice: Released: March 1990; Label: Permanent Records (PERM CD/MC/LP 1)	-
1991	Cooltide: Released: November 1991; Label: Permanent Records (PERM CD/MC/LP 4)	-
1992	Couldn't Love You More: Released: August 1992; Label: Permanent Records (PERM CD/MC/LP 9)	65
1993	No Little Boy: Released: July 1993; Label: Permanent Records (PERM CD/MC 14)	-
1996	And: Released: August 1996; Label: Go! Discs (828798-2/-4)	32
1998	The Church with One Bell: Released: 23 March 1998; Label: Independiente (ISOM 3CD)	51
2000	Glasgow Walker: Released: May 2000; Label: Independiente (ISOM 15CD)	66
2004	On the Cobbles: Released: 26 April 2004; Label: Independiente (ISOM 43CD)	95
2011	Heaven and Earth: Released: 16 May 2011; Label: Hole in the Rain (LSM4010)	51
"-" denotes a release that did not chart. Note: the 2009 reissue of Solid Air reached 88 in the UK chart.

=== Live albums ===
- Live at Leeds (Island ILPS 9343, September 1975)
- Philentropy (Body Swerve JMLP 001, November 1983)
- Foundations (Island ILPS 9884, October 1987)
- BBC Radio 1 Live in Concert (30 March 1992)
- Live (July 1995)
- The New York Session (November 2000)
- Germany 1986 (July 2001) (with Danny Thompson)
- The Brewery Arts Centre, Kendal 1986 (August 2001) (with Danny Thompson)
- Live at the Town & Country Club, 1986; Collectors Series 2 (August 2001)
- Sweet Certain Surprise (live in New York, 1977) (October 2001)
- Live at the Bottom Line, New York, 1983; Collectors Series 3 (November 2001)
- Live in Milan, 1979; Collectors Series 4 (May 2002)
- And Live (June 2003) (recorded in 1996)
- Live in Concert at the Cambridge Folk Festival BBC 1985 (December 2003)
- Classics Live (November 2004)
- Live in Nottingham 1976 (May 2005)
- On Air (Bremen Town Hall, Germany, September 1975) (May 2006)
- In Session (August 2006) (BBC sessions, recorded for John Peel and Bob Harris, between 1973 and 1978)
- Live at The Roundhouse (May 2007)
- BBC Live in Concert (June 2007)
- The Battle of Medway: 17 July 1973 (November 2007)
- The Simmer Dim (Garrison Theatre, Lerwick, August 1980) (June 2008)
- The July Wakes (July Wakes Festival, Chorley, Lancs, July 1976) (October 2008)
- Live at the Hanging Lamp (Richmond, London, May 1972) (2013) (vinyl-only release)

=== Compilation albums ===
- So Far So Good (March 1977)
- The Electric John Martyn (October 1982)
- Sweet Little Mysteries: The Island Anthology (June 1994)
- The Hidden Years (December 1996)
- The Very Best Of (April 1997)
- Serendipity — An Introduction to John Martyn (1998)
- Another World; Collectors Series Vol 1 (1998)
- Classics (March 2000)
- The Best of Live '91 (July 2000)
- Solid Air (Classics Re-visited) (September 2002) (2 disc set)
- Late Night John (May 2004)
- Mad Dog Days (June 2004)
- Anthology (September 2004)
- The John Martyn Story (May 2006)
- One World Sampler (November 2006)
- Sixty Minutes With (April 2007)
- Ain't No Saint (September 2008) (4 disc set)
- May You Never — The Very Best Of (March 2009)
- Remembering John Martyn (June 2012)
- Sweet Little Mystery: The Essential (September 2013)
- The Island Years (September 2013) (18 disc box set)
- The Best of the Island Years (November 2014)
- May You Never: The Essential John Martyn (November 2016) (3 disc set)
- Head and Heart: The Acoustic John Martyn (June 2017)

=== Tribute albums ===
- Johnny Boy Would Love This (August 2011)

=== Singles ===
- "John the Baptist" / "The Ocean" (Island WIP 6076, January 1970)
- "Anni Part 1" / "Anni Part 2" (with John Stevens' Away) (Vertigo 6059 140, 1976)
- "Over the Hill" / "Head and Heart" (Island WIP 6385, February 1977)
- "Dancing" / "Dealer" (version) (Island WIP 6414, January 1978)
- "In Search of Anna" / "Certain Surprise" (Island K7450, 1979)
- "Johnny Too Bad" / "Johnny Too Bad" (version) Island WIP 6547, October 1980)
- "Johnny Too Bad" (extended dub version) / "Big Muff" (extended remix) (Island IPR 2047, March 1981)
- "Sweet Little Mystery" / "Johnny Too Bad" (Island WIP 6718, June 1981)
- "Please Fall in Love with Me" / "Don't You Go" (WEA K 79243, August 1981)
- "Hiss on the Tape" / "Livin' Alone" (WEA K 79336, October 1982)
- "Gun Money" (U.S. remix) / "Hiss on the Tape" (live) (WEA 259987-7, November 1982)
- "Over the Rainbow" / "Rope Soul'd" (Island IS 209, October 1984)
- "Angeline" / "Tight Connection to My Heart" (Island IS 265, February 1986)
- "Classic John Martyn" (Island CID 265, February 1986)
- "Angeline" / "Tight Connection to My Heart" / "May You Never" / "Certain Surprise" / "One Day Without You" (Island 12 IS 265, February 1986)
- "Lonely Love" / "Sweet Little Mystery" (live) (Island IS 272, October 1986)
- "Send Me One Line" / "Patterns in the Rain" (Hypertension HYS 100 102, May 1990)
- "Deny This Love" (remix) / "The Apprentice" (live) (Permanent S12, August 1990, 7-inch vinyl)
- "Deny This Love" (remix) / "The Apprentice" (live) / "Deny This Love" (album version) (Permanent CD Perm 1, August 1990)
- "Jack the Lad" / "Annie Sez" / "The Cure" / "Jack Sez" (Permanent CD Perm 3, April 1992)
- "Sweet Little Mystery" / "Head and Heart" (Permanent, Perm 6, September 1982)
- "Lonely Love" / "May You Never" (Permanent, Perm 8, December 1992)
- "Somewhere Over the Rainbow" (Voiceprint, JMCD001, 1998)
- "Excuse Me Mister" / "God Song" (live) / "Rock, Salt & Nails" (live) / "John Wayne" (live) (Independiente, ISOM14MS CD, May 1998)
- "Deliver Me" (with Sister Bliss) (Multiply Records, CDMULTY72, March 2001)

=== DVD/video ===
- John Martyn in Vision 1973–81 (1982)
- Live from London (Camden Palace, 1984)
- Foundations: Live at The Town and Country Club (recorded 1986, released 1988)
- The Apprentice Tour (August 1990)
- Purely Music (January 1992) (released on LaserDisc)
- Tell Them I'm Somebody Else (2000)
- Live in Concert (John Martyn & Band at Camden Palace Theatre, London, 23 November 1984) (2001) (DVD release of 1986 Live from London; re-issued Live at the Camden Palace Theatre London 1984 (2004) & Live from the Camden Palace (2012))
- Live in Dublin (with Danny Thompson at Gaiety Theatre, Dublin, for RTE TV, Ireland, June 1986) (February 2005)
- John Martyn at the BBC (various 1973–1982) (August 2006)
- The Apprentice in Concert (John Martyn & Band with Dave Gilmour at Shaw Theatre, London, 31 March 1990) (2006) (DVD release of 1990 The Apprentice Tour)
- Empty Ceiling (John Martyn & Band recorded for Ohne Filter, German TV, April 1986) (November 2006)
- Solid Air Live at The Roundhouse (John Martyn & Band in London, 3 February 2007) (May 2007)
- The Man Upstairs (John Martyn (solo) recorded for Rockpalast, German TV, 17 March 1978) (April 2008)
- One World One John (John Martyn & Band recorded mostly at Vicar Street, Dublin in 1999, 2000 & 2003) (February 2012)
