= The Church with One Bell =

Studio album by John Martyn
- Released: 23 March 1998
- Studio: CaVa Sound Studios (Glasgow)
- Genre: Folk, blues
- Length: 42:09
- Label: Independiente
- Producer: Norman Dayron; John Martyn

John Martyn chronology
And (1997)	The Church with One Bell (1998)	Glasgow Walker (2000)

Professional ratings
Review scores
Source	Rating
AllMusic	3/5 stars

The Church with One Bell is a 1998 covers album by John Martyn. It was recorded in one week at CaVa Sound Studios, Glasgow, Scotland. The CD has a hidden bonus track after a 50-second break attached to the last track. It is a slower and remixed version without synthesizer of "How Fortunate The Man With None".

The cover depicts a former church in the village of Roberton in Lanarkshire, Scotland. Martyn, who at that time was living in an adjacent cottage, purchased the church and converted it into a recording studio.

== Track listing ==
1. "He's Got All the Whiskey" (Bobby Charles) - 3:17
2. "God's Song (That's Why I Love Mankind)" (Randy Newman) - 3:28
3. "How Fortunate the Man with None " (Dead Can Dance; words: Bertolt Brecht) - 4:57
4. "Small Town Talk" (Bobby Charles, Rick Danko) - 2:50
5. "Excuse Me Mister" (Ben Harper) - 4:35
6. "Strange Fruit" (Lewis Allan) - 4:02
7. "The Sky Is Crying" (Elmore James, Clarence Lewis, Morgan Robinson) - 4:02
8. "Glory Box" (Adrian Utley, Beth Gibbons, Geoff Barrow) - 5:43
9. "Feel So Bad" (Lightnin' Hopkins) - 3:29
10. "Death Don't Have No Mercy" (Reverend Gary Davis) - 5:46

== Personnel ==
- John Martyn – vocals, guitar
- Spencer Cozens – acoustic piano, keyboards
- John Giblin – bass
- Arran Ahmun – drums, percussion

Production

- John Martyn – producer
- Norman Dayron – producer
- Stefon Taylor – engineer
- Lawrence Watson – photography
