= So Far So Good (Meernaa album) =

Studio album by Meernaa
- Released: October 6, 2023
- Genre: Pop
- Length: 41:26
- Language: English
- Label: Keeled Scales

Meernaa chronology
Heart Hunger (2019)	So Far So Good (2023)

“I’ve adopted the term “zen nihilist” ’cause I feel like, especially when I wrote that song, too, it was just the beginning of the pandemic, and I didn’t have any money, and I just moved to LA with Rob [Shelton, musical collaborator], and we had no plans. Again, back to patience. You have no control. All you can do is wait it out and see what happens. So far so good is such a funny phrase to me ’cause it’s like, “Well, you know, we’ll see if shit hits the fan. I don’t know, but right now, it’s chill.”

—Meernaa on the title track.

So Far So Good is a 2023 studio album by American pop musician Meernaa.

== Reception ==
Neville Hardman's feature interview with Meernaa for Alternative Press called this release "a psychedelic soul-search" that "reflects a measured step forward" for the musician. In Billboard, Jason Lipshutz included the title track as one of 10 pop songs to recommend to readers, recommending it to "fans of idiosyncratic, relatively chilled-out indie-pop a la Aldous Harding, Westerman and Nilüfer Yanya" as a "quietly effective new track" with "elegant instrumentation" and "delectable hooks". At The Fader, editors chose this on the long list of the week's best albums. Editors at Pitchfork shortlisted this as a recommended album of the week and critic Vrinda Jagota gave it a 7.4 out of 10 for being able to pair "abstract imagery with elegant arrangements on her dreamy, open-ended second album" continuing that Meernaa's vocals have a sense of longing but "despite the intensity of the emotion, the symphonic, elegant arrangements make her words feel accessible and inviting".

== Track listing ==
1. "On My Line" – 3:12
2. "Another Dimension" – 4:31
3. "As Many Birds Flying" – 4:51
4. "Mirror Heart" – 3:34
5. "Black Eyed Susan" – 5:04
6. "I Believe in You" – 3:16
7. "Framed in a Different State" – 4:13
8. "Bhuta Kala" – 3:40
9. "So Far So Good" – 3:48
10. "Love Is Good" – 5:25

== Personnel ==
- Meernaa – instrumentation, vocals
- Andrew Maguire
- Rob Shelton
- Doug Stuart

== See also ==
- 2023 in American music
- List of 2023 albums
