= John Stevens (drummer) =

English drummer(1940

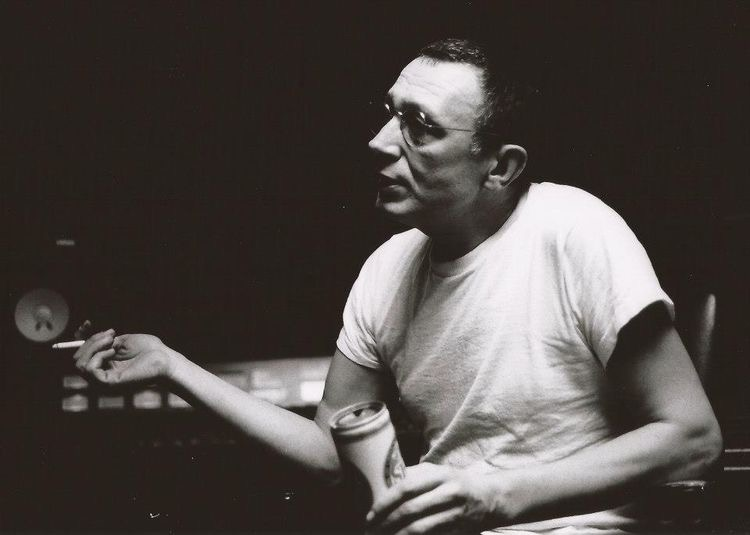

Background information
- Born: John William Stevens; 10 June 1940; Brentford, Middlesex, England
- Died: 13 September 1994 (aged 54) Ealing, London, England
- Genres: Jazz, free jazz
- Occupation: Musician
- Instrument: Drums
- Label: Nessa

Home sample
An audio sample of "Home" (from Touching On, 1977)

John William Stevens (10 June 1940 – 13 September 1994) was an English drummer, and a founding member of the Spontaneous Music Ensemble.

== Biography ==
Stevens was born in Brentford, Middlesex, England, the son of a tap dancer. He listened to jazz as a child but was more interested in drawing and painting, through which he expressed himself throughout his life. He studied at the Ealing Art College and then started work in a design studio, but left at 19 to join the Royal Air Force. He studied the drums at the Royal Air Force School of Music in Uxbridge, and while there met Trevor Watts and Paul Rutherford, two musicians who became close collaborators.

In the mid-1960s, Stevens began to play in London jazz groups with Tubby Hayes and Ronnie Scott, and in 1965 he led a quartet. He moved away from mainstream jazz when he heard free jazz from the U.S. by musicians like Ornette Coleman and Albert Ayler. In 1966, he formed the Spontaneous Music Ensemble (SME) with Watts and Rutherford. The band moved into the Little Theatre Club at Garrick Yard, St Martin's Lane, London. In 1967, their first album, Challenge, was released. Stevens then became interested in the music of Anton Webern, and the SME began to play quiet music. Stevens also became interested in non-Western music.

Stevens appears on John Lennon and Yoko Ono's Unfinished Music No. 2: Life with the Lions. Stevens and saxophonist John Tchicai join Ono and Lennon near the end of the piece "Cambridge 1969."

Stevens also devised a number of basic starting points for improvisation. These were not "compositions" as such, but rather a means of getting improvisational activity started, which could then go off in any direction. One of these was the so-called "Click Piece" which essentially asked for each player to repeatedly play a note as short as possible.

Stevens played alongside a large number of prominent free improvisors in the SME, including Derek Bailey, Peter Kowald, Julie Tippetts and Robert Calvert, but from the mid-1970s, the make-up of the SME began to settle down to a regular group of Stevens, Nigel Coombes on violin, and Roger Smith on guitar. During the mid-1970s Stevens played regularly with guitarist and songwriter John Martyn as part of a trio that included bassist Danny Thompson. This line up can be heard on Martyn's 1976 recording Live at Leeds.

From 1983, Stevens was involved with Community Music, an organisation through which he took his form of music making to youth clubs, mental health institutions, the Lewisham Academy of Music, and other unusual places. Notes taken during these sessions were later turned into a book for the Open University called Search and Reflect (1985). In the late 70s and early 1980s, John was a regular performer at the Bracknell Jazz Festival.

Stevens ran or helped to organise groups that were more jazz or jazz-rock based, such as Splinters, the John Stevens Dance Orchestra, Away, Freebop, Folkus, Fast Colour, PRS, and the John Stevens Quintet and Quartet. He contributed to Trevor Watts's group Amalgam, Frode Gjerstad's Detail, and collaborated with Bobby Bradford on several occasions.

SME played for its last time in 1994, when it included John Butcher. Stevens died later that year, from a heart attack, aged 54.

== Discography ==
- John Stevens Spontaneous Music Ensemble (Marmalade, 1969)
- John Stevens' Away (Vertigo, 1975)
- Somewhere in Between (Vertigo, 1976)
- Touching On (View, 1977)
- Chemistry (Vinyl, 1977)
- The Longest Night Vol. 1 with Evan Parker (Ogun, 1977)
- No Fear with Trevor Watts, Barry Guy (Spotlite, 1978)
- The Longest Night Vol. 2 with Evan Parker (Ogun, 1978)
- Ah! (Vinyl, 1978)
- Endgame with Barry Guy, Howard Riley, Trevor Watts (Japo, 1979)
- Application Interaction and... (Spotlite, 1979)
- Integration (Red, 1979)
- 4,4,4 with Evan Parker, Paul Rutherford, Barry Guy (View, 1980)
- Conversation Piece Part 1 & 2 with Gordon Beck, Alan Holdsworth (View, 1980)
- Bobby Bradford with John Stevens and the Spontaneous Music Ensemble Volume One (Nessa, 1980)
- Bobby Bradford with John Stevens and the Spontaneous Music Ensemble Volume Two (Nessa, 1981)
- Freebop (Affinity, 1982)
- Re Touch with Alan Holdsworth, Jeff Young, Barry Guy, Ron Mathewson (View, 1983)
- Backwards and Forwards, Forwards and Backwards with Frode Gjerstad, Johnny Dyani (Impetus, 1983)
- The Life of Riley (Affinity, 1984)
- Radebe They Shoot to Kill with Dudu Pukwana (Affinity, 1987)
- Playing with Derek Bailey (Incus, 1993)
- This That with Dick Heckstall-Smith, Jack Bruce (Atonal, 1994)
- Mutual Benefit (Konnex, 1994)
- New Cool (The Jazz Label, 1994)
- A Luta Continua (Konnex, 1994)
- One Time with Kent Carter, Derek Bailey (Incus, 1995)
- Seven Improvisations with Gary Smith (1995)
- Bird in Widnes with Dick Heckstall-Smith (Konnex, 1995)
- Sunshine with Frode Gjerstad (Impetus, 1996)
- Dynamics of the Impromptu with Derek Bailey (Entropy Stereo, 1999)
- Hello Goodbye with Frode Gjerstad, Derek Bailey (Emanem, 2001)
- Organic with Howard Riley, Barry Guy (Jazzprint, 2002)
- Live at the Plough (Ayler, 2003)
- Keep on Playing with Frode Gjerstad (FMR, 2005)
- Propensity with Allan Holdsworth, Danny Thompson (Art of Life, 2009)

With the Spontaneous Music Ensemble

- Quintessence (Emanem, 1974 [1986])
