= And (John Martyn album) =

Studio album by John Martyn
- Released: July 1996
- Studio: JMI (Nashville): The Washoose (Crawfordjohn)
- Genre: Rock, downtempo
- Length: 46:04
- Label: Go! Discs
- Producer: John Martyn: Stefon Taylor; Spencer Cozens

John Martyn chronology
Cooltide (1991)	And (1996)	The Church with One Bell (1998)

And is an album by John Martyn. It was recorded at JMI Studios (Nashville) and The Washoose (Crawfordjohn, Lanarkshire), and was released on CD by Go! Discs in 1996, with the catalogue number 828 798-2.

== Track listing ==
All tracks composed by John Martyn except where indicated.

1. "Sunshine's Better" – 5:12
2. "Suzanne" – 3:52
3. "The Downward Pull of Human Nature" – 5:05
4. "All in Your Favour" – 4:26
5. "A Little Strange" (John Martyn, Leon Ware, Arthur Ross) – 4:55
6. "Who Are They?" – 2:29
7. "Step It Up" – 4:27
8. "Carmine" – 5:29
9. "She's A Lover" – 5:19
10. "Sunshine's Better" [Acid Remix] (hidden track) – 5:50

== Personnel ==
(as listed on original CD release)

- John Martyn – vocals, backing vocals, keyboards, guitars
- Spencer Cozens – keyboards, programming
- Kirk Lothian – keyboards
- Foster Patterson – keyboards
- Stefon Taylor – programming
- Alan Thomson – bass
- John Giblin – bass
- Phil Collins – drums, backing vocals
- Jerry Underwood – saxophone
- Cheryl Wilson – backing vocals

=== Production ===
- Phil Collins – executive producer
- John Martyn – producer
- Stefon Taylor – producer, engineer, mixing (1–4, 8, 9)
- Spencer Cozens – co-producer, engineer, mixing (5, 7)
- Douglas "Bone" Graham – engineer, mixing (6)
- Gordon Vicary – mastering
- Lawrence Watson – cover photography
