= Live at Leeds (John Martyn album) =

Live album by John Martyn
- Released: 1976
- Recorded: 13 February 1975, Leeds University
- Genre: Folk rock, blues
- Length: 49:17
- Label: Island
- Producer: John Martyn

Professional ratings
Review scores
Source	Rating
AllMusic	4/5 stars
Mojo	4/5 stars
Record Collector	4/5 stars

Live at Leeds is a live album by the British singer-songwriter John Martyn. He independently released this album himself in an initial run of 10,000 that were numbered and signed, after a disagreement with Island about its commercial viability. The working title was "Ringside Seat"; photos of Martyn and bassist Danny Thompson in a boxing ring were taken for a prospective cover, though never used. It was recorded on 13 February 1975 (the sleeve incorrectly states October), at Leeds University, at the same venue that the Who recorded their album Live at Leeds in 1970.

The 1998 re-released version on Voiceprint/One World includes five bonus tracks ("My Baby Girl", "You Can Discover", "So Much in Love With You", "Clutches" and "Mailman") from the show, including the three Paul Kossoff of Free guested on.

In 2006 Recall released a 2CD set, Live At Leeds And More, comprising all the tracks from the 1998 version plus a 2nd CD of live material not from 1975 at all, recorded between 1979 and 1996, culled from his various One World releases.

A 2CD Deluxe Edition compiled and researched by John Hillarby was released in 2010 by Universal Music. It contains the 1975 concert in its entirety, complete with hold ups, chatter and profane drunken insults between Martyn and Thompson, with Disc 2 including 35 minutes of the afternoon rehearsal as bonus material. The versions of "Outside In" and "Solid Air" on the original (which were not recorded at the Leeds concert) are replaced. The profanity of the between song banter led to this version of the album featuring a Parental Advisory sticker, undermining the simple, bootleg-style artwork.

== Track listing ==
All tracks composed by John Martyn except where indicated.

1. "Outside In" – 18:56
2. "Solid Air" – 7:18
3. "Make No Mistake" – 5:04
4. "Bless The Weather" – 4:45
5. "The Man in the Station" – 4:18
6. "I'd Rather Be The Devil" (Skip James) – 8:54

== 1998 Re-release with Bonus Tracks ==
1. "Outside In" – 18:56
2. "Solid Air" – 7:18
3. "Make No Mistake" – 5:04
4. "Bless The Weather" – 4:45
5. "The Man in the Station" – 4:18
6. "I'd Rather Be The Devil" – 8:54
7. "My Baby Girl" – 2:39 (bonus track)
8. "You Can Discover" – 3:52 (bonus track)
9. "So Much In Love With You" – 5:23 (bonus track)
10. "Clutches" – 5:19 (bonus track)
11. "Mailman" – 5:28 (bonus track)

== 2006 'Live At Leeds And More' ==
CD1 – As the 1998 re-release, above, including bonus tracks.

CD2 – Various live recordings, 1979 - 1996.

1. "Big Muff" – 6:59 – live in Milan, 1979
2. "Over The Rainbow" (Harold Arlen, Yip Harburg) – 4:55 – live in London, Town & Country Club, 1986
3. "Yes We Can" (Allen Toussaint) – 6:32 – live on tour, 1996
4. "Step It Up" – 5:44 – live on tour, 1996
5. "Dealer" – 2:22 – live in Kendal, 1986
6. "Beverley" – 2:03 – live in Kendal, 1986
7. "Looking On" – 10:26 – live in London, Shaw Theatre, 1990
8. "The River" – 5:17 – live in London, Shaw Theatre, 1990
9. "Root Love" – 5:31 – live in New York, The Bottom Line, 1983
10. "Anna" – 8:34 – live in New York, The Bottom Line, 1983

== 2010 2CD Deluxe Edition ==
CD1

1. "May You Never"
2. "Outside In"
3. "Spencer The Rover"
4. "Make No Mistake"
5. "Bless The Weather"
6. "My Baby Girl"
7. "You Can Discover"
8. "Solid Air"

CD2

1. "I'd Rather Be The Devil"
2. "So Much in Love With You"
3. "Clutches"
4. "Mailman"
5. "May You Never" (Rehearsal)
6. "The Message" (Rehearsal)
7. "Outside In" (Rehearsal)
8. "The Man in the Station" (Rehearsal)
9. "Head and Heart" (Rehearsal)
10. "Clutches" (Rehearsal)

== Personnel ==
- John Martyn - vocals, guitar
- Danny Thompson - bass
- John Stevens - drums
- Paul Kossoff - guitar [bonus tracks only]
