= Beverley Martyn =

British musician (1947–2026)

Background information
- Born: Beverley Kutner; 24 March 1947 near Coventry, England
- Died: 27 April 2026 (aged 79)
- Genres: Folk; folk rock
- Occupations: Musician; singer; songwriter
- Years active: 1965–2026
- Labels: Island; Voiceprint

Beverley Martyn (née Kutner; 24 March 1947 – 27 April 2026) was an English folk musician. At various times, she worked with John Martyn, Levon Helm, Jimmy Page, Dave Pegg, Richard Thompson, John Renbourn, Ralph McTell, Davy Graham and Sandy Denny.

== Early life and career ==
Beverley Kutner was born near Coventry, England on 24 March 1947. While still a student, she was picked to front The Levee Breakers, a jug band featuring Mac McGann and Johnny Joyce, who played the folk circuit in south east England. She appeared in the photograph on the album sleeve of Bert Jansch's 1965 album, It Don't Bother Me, where she can be seen lounging in the background.

At the age of 16 she recorded her first single with The Levee Breakers, "Babe I'm Leaving You", which was released on the Parlophone label in 1965.

Kutner was then signed as a solo artist to the Deram Records label, releasing singles under the mononym "Beverley". In 1966 she released a single, "Happy New Year" (b-side "Where The Good Times Are"), written by Randy Newman, on which she was accompanied by Jimmy Page, John Paul Jones, Nicky Hopkins and Andy White. "Happy New Year" was chosen as the first single release on the brand new Deram label, distributed by Decca Records, in 1966, catalogue number DM 101. The second single was the Cat Stevens hit, "I Love My Dog" (DM 102). She also recorded a then unreleased single in the same year, "Picking Up The Sunshine" / "Gin House Blues". These last two tracks also featured John Renbourn and Mike Lease. The single was released only in April 2017. During that period she was taught the guitar by the folk guitarist Bert Jansch, who also encouraged her songwriting. Her follow-up single "Museum", written by Donovan and produced by Denny Cordell, was released in 1967.

Closely involved with the folk scene at the time, she met Paul Simon who invited her to New York. On the Simon & Garfunkel album Bookends, she contributed to the track "Fakin' It", in the middle of which she is heard saying: "Good morning, Mr Leitch, have you had a busy day?" She later appeared at the Monterey Pop Festival on 16 June 1967, as did Simon & Garfunkel.

== With John Martyn ==
In 1969, she met John Martyn (September 11, 1948 – January 29, 2009), whom she later married. As a duo they issued two albums, Stormbringer! and The Road to Ruin, both of which were released on Island Records. Following The Road to Ruin, Island persuaded John Martyn to resume his career as a solo artist, because they believed that there was more public interest in solo singer/songwriters. Although she was spending more time with her children, Martyn continued to contribute to her husband's solo projects until the breakdown of their marriage, owing heavily to her husband's alcoholism and abuse. The couple divorced during the making of John Martyn's album Grace and Danger in 1980 and she retired from music for years.

== Return to music ==
In the 1990s, with her children now grown, she was invited to join Loudon Wainwright III on his European tour. In 1998 she resumed her recording career with the release of the album No Frills.

In 2004, Martyn's song "Primrose Hill", about the simple joys of domesticity, which she wrote and sang on Road To Ruin, was sampled by Fatboy Slim for the track "North West Three" on his 2004 album Palookaville.

On 3 December 2013, she performed the song "Levee Breaks" with her band at the concert 'A Celebration Of Bert Jansch' at London's Royal Festival Hall, alongside Robert Plant, Donovan and various members of Pentangle, amongst others. The concert was broadcast by BBC Four in the UK on 28 March 2014 under the name The Genius of Bert Jansch: Folk Blues and Beyond.

Martyn released a new album in 2014 entitled The Phoenix and The Turtle. It contains a previously unrecorded Nick Drake and Martyn song, "Reckless Jane". The album featured bass by Matt Malley (Counting Crows), drums by Victor Bisetti (Los Lobos), acoustic guitars by Mark Pavey, electric guitars by Jakob Nebel (Livingston) and Michael Watts, and strings by Owain Roberts.

== Death ==
Martyn died at home on 27 April 2026, at the age of 79.

== Discography ==
=== Singles ===
- "Babe, I'm Leaving You" (McGann) / "Wild About My Lovin'" (Trad. Arr. Joyce) (June 1965 with the Levee Breakers)
- "Happy New Year" (Newman) / "Where The Good Times Are" (Martyn) (September 1966 as "Beverley")
- "Museum" (Leitch) / "A Quick One For Sanity" (by "D. Cordell Tea Time Ensemble") (July 1967 as "Beverley")
- "Picking Up The Sunshine" / "Me and My Gin" (1966 as "Beverley"; released 2017)

=== Albums ===
- Stormbringer! (February 1970 with John Martyn)
- The Road to Ruin (November 1970 with John Martyn)
- No Frills (1998)
- The Phoenix and the Turtle (2014)
- Where The Good Times Are (as Beverley) (2018)
