= Folk jazz =

Music genre

- Stylistic origins: Folk; jazz; world; experimental
- Cultural origins: 1950s, U.S.
- Typical instruments: Electric guitars; violins; double basses; string section; electric bass; piano; pipe organ; saxophone; woodwind instruments; trumpet; brass instruments; drums; hammond organ; tambourines; vocals; xylophone
- Derivative forms: New-age

Folk jazz is a musical style that combines traditional folk music with elements of jazz, usually featuring richly texturized songs. Its origins can be traced back to the 1950s, when artists such as Jimmy Giuffre and Tony Scott pursued distinct approaches to folk music production, initially, as a vehicle for soloist expression. Many already popular musical styles diversified as counter-culture bands embraced experimentation and inclusiveness in their works.

"Rainy Day Women #12 & 35" from Bob Dylan's 1966 double album Blonde on Blonde blends various Americana traditions with a jazzy rhythm. In 1968, Van Morrison released the influential Astral Weeks, a mixture of folk, jazz, blues, soul and classical music. In 1969, Tim Buckley released Happy Sad, an album in which he hinted at his early jazz influences – most notably Miles Davis – by infusing his folk-based songs with a non-traditional jazz timbre. Joni Mitchell released three albums in a folk-jazz hybrid style between 1975 and 1977, beginning with The Hissing of Summer Lawns.
