= List of Thin Lizzy members =

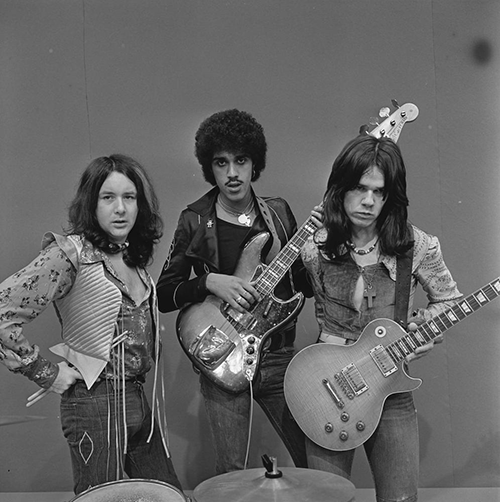
(left to right) Brian Downey, Phil Lynott and Gary Moore

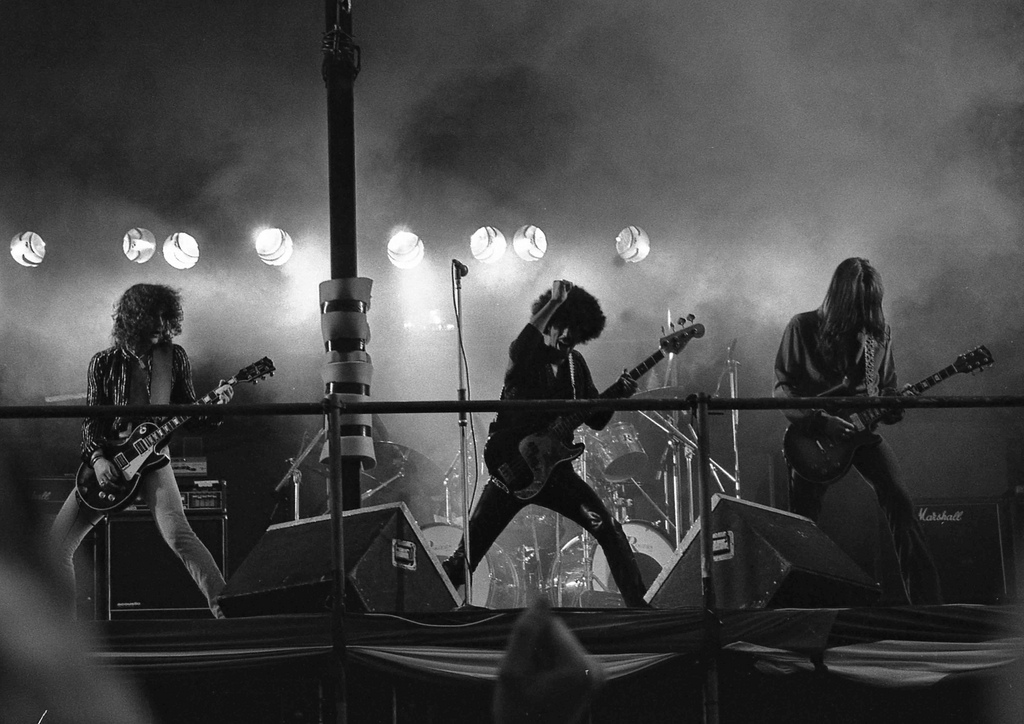
(left to right) Brian Robertson, Phil Lynott, Brian Downey (obscured) and Scott Gorham

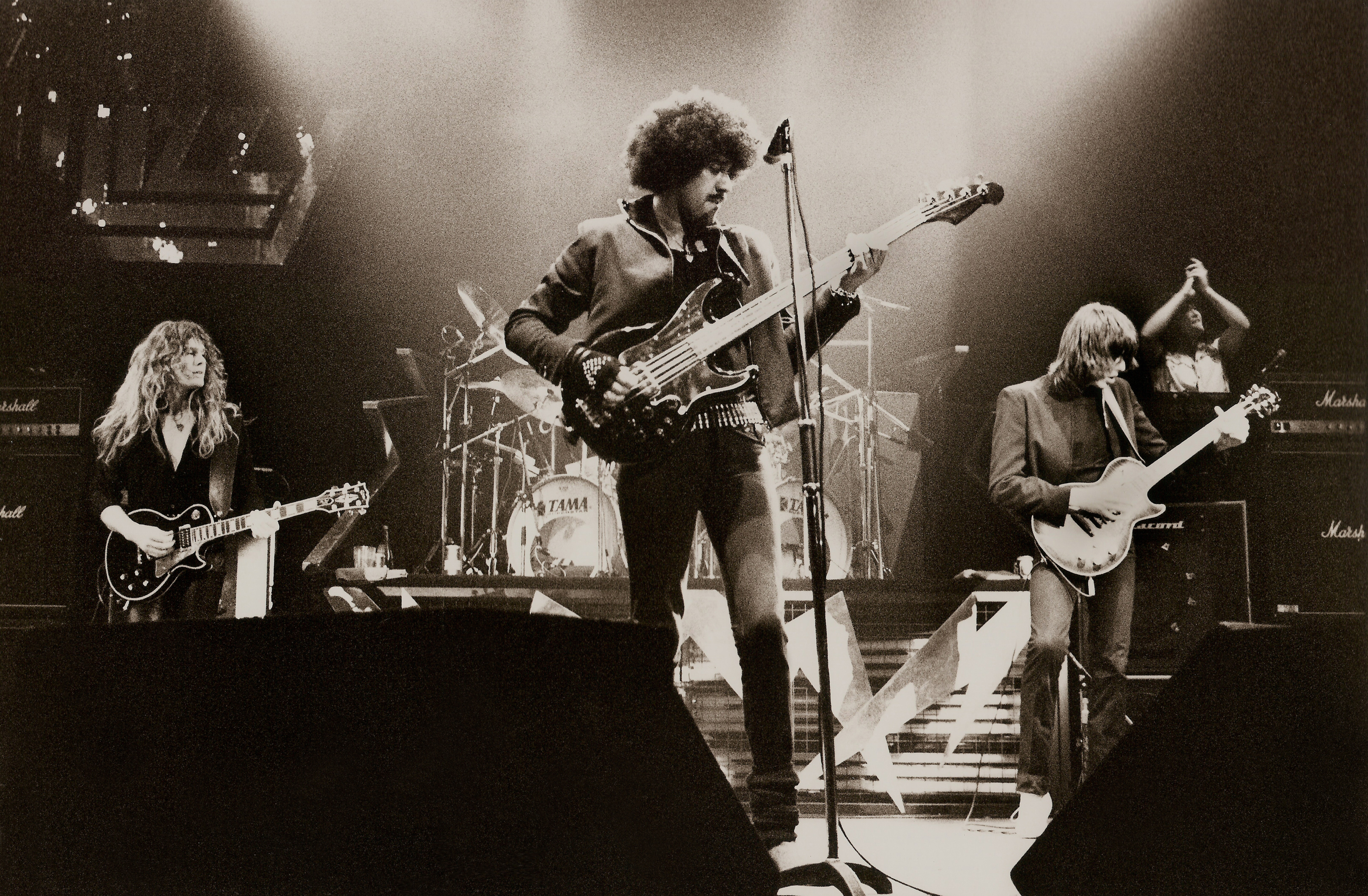
(left to right) John Sykes, Phil Lynott, Brian Downey (obscured), Scott Gorham and Darren Wharton

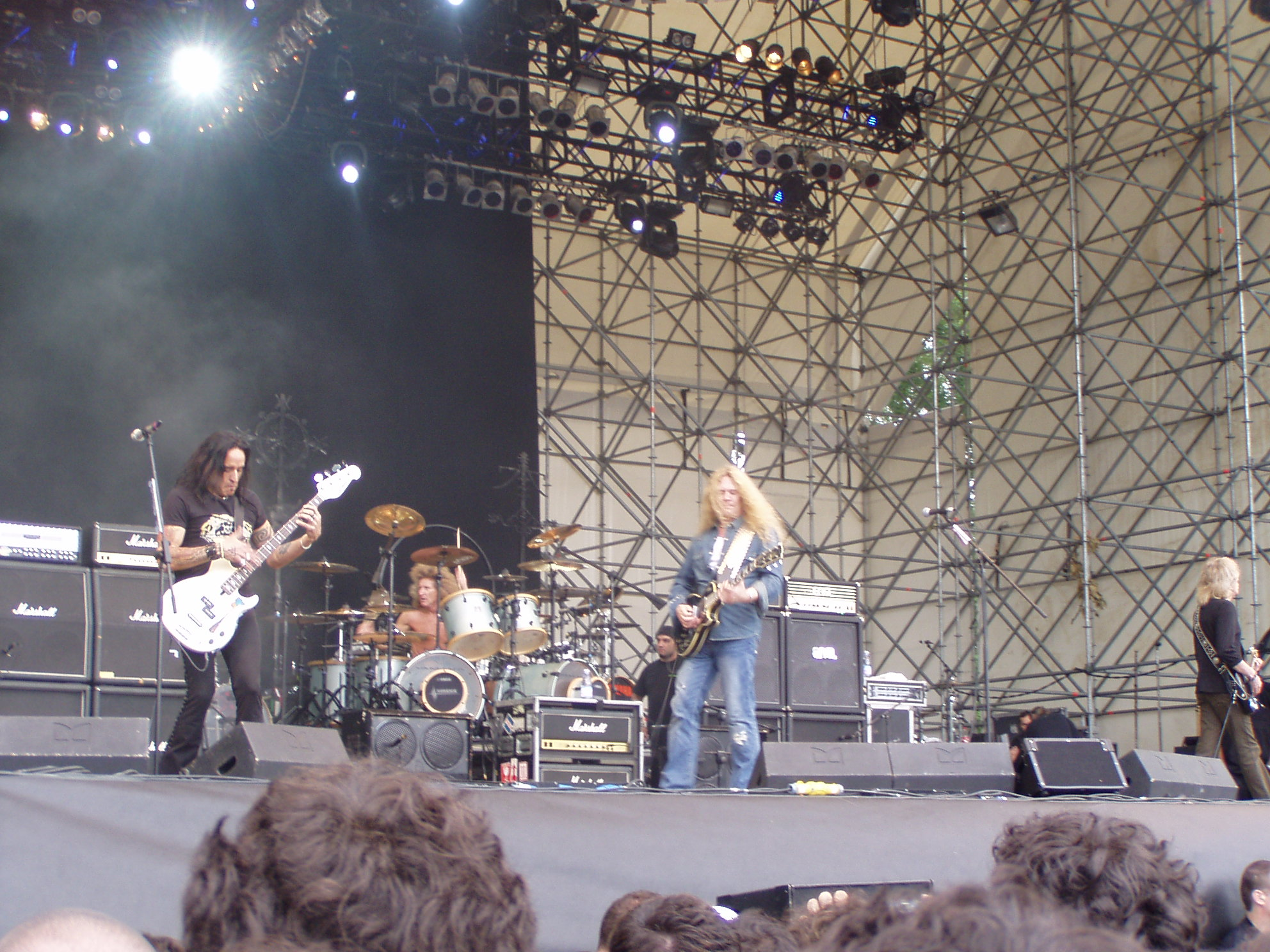
(left to right) Marco Mendoza, Tommy Aldridge, Scott Gorham and John Sykes.

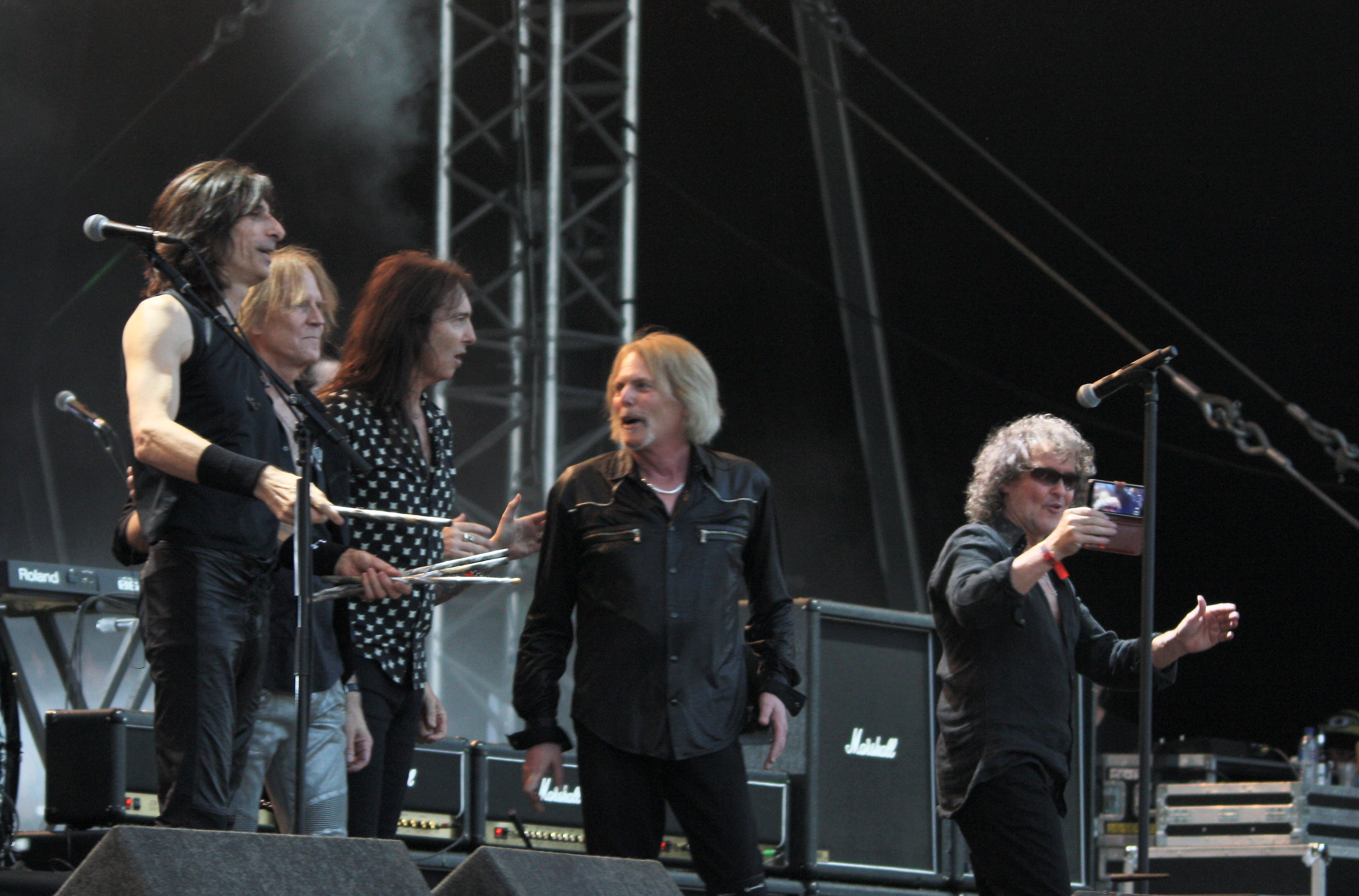
(left to right) Scott Travis, Tom Hamilton, Damon Johnson, Scott Gorham and Darren Wharton (Ricky Warwick not shown)

Five lineups of Thin Lizzy in 1974, 1978, 1983, 2007 and 2016

Thin Lizzy are an Irish hard rock band from Dublin. Formed in 1969, the group originally consisted of bassist and vocalist Phil Lynott, guitarist Eric Bell, drummer Brian Downey and keyboardist Eric Wrixon. The band broke up in September 1983, at which point the lineup included Lynott and Downey, guitarists Scott Gorham and John Sykes, and keyboardist Darren Wharton. In 1996, ten years after Lynott's death, the group reformed as a touring outfit with new bassist Marco Mendoza, and Sykes taking over lead vocal duties. The most recent lineup, which performed in 2019, consisted of Gorham, Wharton, vocalist Ricky Warwick (since 2010), guitarist Damon Johnson (since 2011), drummer Scott Travis (since 2016), and bassist Troy Sanders, who has so far only featured that year.

== History ==
=== 1969–1983 ===
Thin Lizzy were formed in December 1969, with four members joining from two bands: guitarist Eric Bell and keyboardist Eric Wrixon from Them, and bassist and vocalist Phil Lynott and drummer Brian Downey from Orphanage. Wrixon performed on the band's debut single "The Farmer", but left before it was released in July 1970. Bell left the band after a concert on New Year's Eve 1973, later citing "ill-health caused by the band's lifestyle" as the reason for his departure. The guitarist was replaced by Gary Moore, although he would only remain with the band for a matter of months. Andy Gee and John Du Cann took over for a tour in May, before Brian Robertson and Scott Gorham were enlisted later in the year as Bell's first full-time replacements.

The lineup of Lynott, Gorham, Robertson and Downey released five studio albums and one live album, all but two of which reached the top ten of the UK Albums Chart, before Robertson left in 1978 and was replaced by the returning Moore. Downey also briefly took a break from Thin Lizzy around the same time, with Mark Nauseef replacing him for a tour in late 1978. Moore left again in July 1979, and was temporarily replaced by Midge Ure. Dave Flett was brought in for a Japanese tour later in the year, as Ure moved over to keyboards, and in early 1980 Snowy White took Flett's place on a more permanent basis. Darren Wharton replaced Ure in April, initially as a touring member. White left the band in August 1982, and was replaced by John Sykes in September 1982, who featured on their last studio album Thunder and Lightning. Thin Lizzy broke up in 1983, with their final performance taking place on 4 September on the German Monsters of Rock Tour; Lynott later died of heart failure and pneumonia on 4 January 1986.

=== 1996 onwards ===
Thin Lizzy reformed in 1996, with Sykes taking over lead vocals and Marco Mendoza joining on bass, alongside returning members Gorham, Wharton and Downey. Tommy Aldridge replaced Downey in 1998, and Wharton left in 2001 to focus on his own band Dare. Mendoza and Aldridge left in 2003 to join Whitesnake, with their places taken by Guy Pratt and Michael Lee, respectively. Pratt was replaced later in the year by Randy Gregg. Mendoza had returned to the band by early 2005, as had Aldridge by early 2007. Mendoza was replaced by Francesco DiCosmo later in 2007. After more touring, Sykes departed Thin Lizzy in mid-2009, with DiCosmo and Aldridge leaving at the same time; speaking about the future of the band, Gorham claimed that "we will be back up to full speed soon".

Gorham reformed Thin Lizzy in 2010 with former members Mendoza, Downey and Wharton, in addition to new guitarist Vivian Campbell and lead vocalist Ricky Warwick. Campbell was replaced by Richard Fortus after returning to Def Leppard in mid-2011, before Damon Johnson became his permanent replacement later in the year. The band was put on hiatus in December 2012, when all members formed Black Star Riders, before returning in 2016 with Mikkey Dee initially announced on drums. Without performing with the band, Dee was replaced three months later by Judas Priest's Scott Travis, as Aerosmith's Tom Hamilton also replaced Mendoza. In April 2019, Mastodon's Troy Sanders took over from Hamilton on bass.

== Original tenure (1969–1983) ==
=== Official members ===
Image	Name	Years active	Instruments	Release contributions
	Phil Lynott	1969–1983 (died 1986)	bass; lead vocals; guitar; keyboards	all Thin Lizzy releases from "The Farmer" (1970) to The Boys Are Back in Town (1997); UK Tour '75 (2008); Live '77 (2009); Still Dangerous (2009)
	Brian Downey	1969–1983	drums; percussion	all Thin Lizzy releases to date, except The Boys Are Back in Town (1997) and One Night Only (2000)
	Eric Bell	1969–1973	guitar; backing vocals	all Thin Lizzy releases from "The Farmer" (1970) to Vagabonds of the Western World (1973); Life (1983) – one track only; The Peel Sessions (1995) – three tracks only
	Eric Wrixon	1969–1970 (died 2015)	keyboards; backing vocals	"The Farmer" (1970)
	Gary Moore	1974; 1977; 1978–1979 (died 2011)	guitar; backing vocals	Nightlife (1974) : one track only; Black Rose: A Rock Legend (1979); Life (1983) : two tracks only; The Peel Sessions (1995) : two tracks only; Live at Sydney Harbour '78
	Scott Gorham	1974–1983	guitar; backing vocals	all Thin Lizzy releases from Nightlife (1974) onwards
	Brian Robertson	1974–1977; 1977–1978	guitar; backing vocals	all Thin Lizzy releases from Nightlife (1974) to Live and Dangerous (1978); Live (1980); Killers Live (1981); Life (1983) – two tracks only; UK Tour '75 (2008); Live '77 (2009); Still Dangerous (2009)
	Snowy White	1980–1982	guitar; backing vocals	all Thin Lizzy releases from Chinatown (1980) to Renegade (1981); Life (1983) – three tracks only
	Darren Wharton	1980–1983	keyboards; backing vocals	all Thin Lizzy releases from Chinatown (1980) to BBC Radio One Live in Concert (1992); One Night Only (2000); all Thin Lizzy releases from Live in London 2011: 22.01.2011 (2011) onwards
	John Sykes	1982–1983 (died 2024)	guitar; backing vocals	Thunder and Lightning (1983); Life (1983); BBC Radio One Live in Concert (1992); One Night Only (2000)

=== Touring members ===
Image	Name	Years active	Instruments	Release contributions
	Andy Gee	1974	guitar; backing vocals	none
	John Du Cann	1974 (died 2011)	guitar; backing vocals	none
	Mark Nauseef	1978; 1982	percussion; drums	The Boys Are Back in Town (1997)
	Midge Ure	1979–1980 (guest 2016)	keyboards; backing vocals; guitar (1979)	The Continuing Saga of the Ageing Orphans (1979) – two tracks
	Dave Flett	1979	guitar; backing vocals	none

== Recent years (1996 onwards) ==
=== Most recent lineup (2019) ===
Image	Name	Years active	Instruments	Release contributions
	Scott Gorham	1996–2019	guitar; backing vocals	all Thin Lizzy releases from Nightlife (1974) onwards
	Darren Wharton	1996–2001; 2010–2019	keyboards; backing vocals	all Thin Lizzy releases from Chinatown (1980) to BBC Radio One Live in Concert (1992); One Night Only (2000); all Thin Lizzy releases from Live in London 2011: 22.01.2011 (2011) onwards
	Ricky Warwick	2010–2019	lead vocals; guitar	all Thin Lizzy releases from Live in London 2011: 22.01.2011 (2011) onwards
	Damon Johnson	2011–2019	guitar; backing vocals	Live 2012 (2012)
	Scott Travis	2016–2019	drums; percussion	none
	Troy Sanders	2019	bass; backing vocals	none

=== Former members ===
Image	Name	Years active	Instruments	Release contributions
	John Sykes	1996–2009 (died 2024)	lead vocals; guitar	Thunder and Lightning (1983); Life (1983); BBC Radio One Live in Concert (1992); One Night Only (2000)
	Marco Mendoza	1996–2003; 2005–2007; 2010–2013	bass; backing vocals	One Night Only (2000); all Thin Lizzy releases from Live in London 2011: 22.01.2011 (2011) onwards
	Brian Downey	1996–1998; 2010–2013	drums; percussion	all Thin Lizzy releases to date, except The Boys Are Back in Town (1997) and One Night Only (2000)
	Tommy Aldridge	1998–2003; 2007–2009	drums; percussion	One Night Only (2000)
	Michael Lee	2003–2007 (died 2008)	drums; percussion	none
	Guy Pratt	2003	bass; backing vocals	none
	Randy Gregg	2003–2005	bass; backing vocals	none
	Francesco DiCosmo	2007–2009	bass; backing vocals	none
	Vivian Campbell	2010–2011	guitar; backing vocals	Live in London 2011: 22.01.2011 and 23.01.2011 (2011)
	Richard Fortus	2011	guitar; backing vocals	High Voltage Recorded Live: July 23rd 2011 (2011)
	Tom Hamilton	2016–2017	bass	none
	Ian Haugland	2016	drums; percussion	none

== Lineups ==
Period	Members	Releases
December 1969 – July 1970	Phil Lynott – bass, lead vocals, guitar; Eric Bell – guitar, backing vocals; Brian Downey – drums, percussion; Eric Wrixon – keyboards, backing vocals	"The Farmer" (1970)
July 1970 – December 1973	Phil Lynott – bass, lead vocals, guitar, keyboards; Eric Bell – guitar, backing vocals; Brian Downey – drums, percussion	Thin Lizzy (1971); New Day (1971); Shades of a Blue Orphanage (1972); Vagabonds of the Western World (1973); The Peel Sessions (1995) – three tracks
January – April 1974	Phil Lynott – bass, lead vocals, guitar, keyboards; Gary Moore – guitar, backing vocals; Brian Downey – drums, percussion	"Sitamoia / Little Darling" (1974); Nightlife (1974) – one track only; The Peel Sessions (1995) – two tracks
May – June 1974	Phil Lynott – bass, lead vocals, guitar, keyboards; Brian Downey – drums, percussion; John Du Cann – guitar, backing vocals (touring); Andy Gee – guitar, backing vocals (touring)	none – live performances only
June 1974 – July 1978	Phil Lynott – bass, lead vocals, keyboards; Brian Robertson – guitar, backing vocals; Scott Gorham – guitar, backing vocals; Brian Downey – drums, percussion	Nightlife (1974); Fighting (1975); Jailbreak (1976); Johnny the Fox (1976); Bad Reputation (1977); Live and Dangerous (1978); Live (1980) – one track only; Killers Live (1981) – one track only; The Peel Sessions (1995) – ten tracks; UK Tour '75 (2008); Live '77 (2009); Still Dangerous (2009)
August – December 1978	Phil Lynott – bass, lead vocals, keyboards; Scott Gorham – guitar, backing vocals; Gary Moore – guitar, backing vocals; Mark Nauseef – drums, percussion (touring)	The Boys Are Back in Town (1997)
December 1978 – July 1979	Phil Lynott – bass, lead vocals, keyboards; Scott Gorham – guitar, backing vocals; Gary Moore – guitar, backing vocals; Brian Downey – drums, percussion	Black Rose: A Rock Legend (1979)
July 1979	Phil Lynott – bass, lead vocals, guitar, keyboards; Scott Gorham – guitar, backing vocals; Brian Downey – drums, percussion	none – live performances only
July – September 1979	Phil Lynott – bass, lead vocals, keyboards; Scott Gorham – guitar, backing vocals; Brian Downey – drums, percussion; Midge Ure – guitar, backing vocals (touring)	none – live performances only
September – December 1979	Phil Lynott – bass, lead vocals; Scott Gorham – guitar, backing vocals; Brian Downey – drums, percussion; Dave Flett – guitar, backing vocals (touring); Midge Ure – keyboards, backing vocals (touring)	none – live performances only
April 1980	Phil Lynott – bass, lead vocals; Scott Gorham – guitar, backing vocals; Snowy White – guitar, backing vocals; Brian Downey – drums, percussion; Midge Ure – keyboards, backing vocals (touring)	none – live performances only
April 1980 – August 1982	Phil Lynott – bass, lead vocals; Scott Gorham – guitar, backing vocals; Snowy White – guitar, backing vocals; Brian Downey – drums, percussion; Darren Wharton – keyboards, backing vocals	Chinatown (1980); Live (1980); Killers Live (1981); Renegade (1981)
September 1982 – September 1983	Phil Lynott – bass, lead vocals; Scott Gorham – guitar, backing vocals; John Sykes – guitar, backing vocals; Brian Downey – drums, percussion; Darren Wharton – keyboards, backing vocals	Thunder and Lightning (1983); Life (1983); BBC Radio One Live in Concert (1992); Thunder and Lightning Tour (2005)
Band inactive September 1983 – March 1996
March 1996 – early 1998	John Sykes – lead vocals, guitar; Scott Gorham – guitar, backing vocals; Marco Mendoza – bass, backing vocals; Brian Downey – drums, percussion; Darren Wharton – keyboards, backing vocals	none – live performances only
Early 1998 – early 2001	John Sykes – lead vocals, guitar; Scott Gorham – guitar, backing vocals; Marco Mendoza – bass, backing vocals; Tommy Aldridge – drums, percussion; Darren Wharton – keyboards, backing vocals	One Night Only (2000)
Early 2001 – March 2003	John Sykes – lead vocals, guitar; Scott Gorham – guitar, backing vocals; Marco Mendoza – bass, backing vocals; Tommy Aldridge – drums, percussion	none – live performances only
March – late 2003	John Sykes – lead vocals, guitar; Scott Gorham – guitar, backing vocals; Guy Pratt – bass, backing vocals; Michael Lee – drums, percussion	none – live performances only
Late 2003 – February 2005	John Sykes – lead vocals, guitar; Scott Gorham – guitar, backing vocals; Randy Gregg – bass, backing vocals; Michael Lee – drums, percussion	none – live performances only
February 2005 – January 2007	John Sykes – lead vocals, guitar; Scott Gorham – guitar, backing vocals; Marco Mendoza – bass, backing vocals; Michael Lee – drums, percussion	none – live performances only
January – November 2007	John Sykes – lead vocals, guitar; Scott Gorham – guitar, backing vocals; Marco Mendoza – bass, backing vocals; Tommy Aldridge – drums, percussion	none – live performances only
November 2007 – July 2009	John Sykes – lead vocals, guitar; Scott Gorham – guitar, backing vocals; Francesco DiCosmo – bass, backing vocals; Tommy Aldridge – drums, percussion	none – live performances only
Band inactive July 2009 – May 2010
May 2010 – April 2011	Ricky Warwick – lead vocals, guitar; Scott Gorham – guitar, backing vocals; Vivian Campbell – guitar, backing vocals; Marco Mendoza – bass, backing vocals; Brian Downey – drums, percussion; Darren Wharton – keyboards, backing vocals	Live in London 2011: 22.01.2011 (2011); Live in London 2011: 23.01.2011 (2011)
April – November 2011	Ricky Warwick – lead vocals, guitar; Scott Gorham – guitar, backing vocals; Richard Fortus – guitar, backing vocals; Marco Mendoza – bass, backing vocals; Brian Downey – drums, percussion; Darren Wharton – keyboards, backing vocals	High Voltage Recorded Live: July 23rd 2011 (2011)
November 2011 – March 2013	Ricky Warwick – lead vocals, guitar; Scott Gorham – guitar, backing vocals; Damon Johnson – guitar, backing vocals; Marco Mendoza – bass, backing vocals; Brian Downey – drums, percussion; Darren Wharton – keyboards, backing vocals	Live 2012 (2012)
Band inactive March 2013 – July 2016
July 2016 – January 2017	Ricky Warwick – lead vocals, guitar; Scott Gorham – guitar, backing vocals; Damon Johnson – guitar, backing vocals; Tom Hamilton – bass; Scott Travis – drums, percussion; Darren Wharton – keyboards, backing vocals	none – live performances only
Band inactive January 2017 – April 2019
April–July 2019	Ricky Warwick – lead vocals, guitar; Scott Gorham – guitar, backing vocals; Damon Johnson – guitar, backing vocals; Troy Sanders – bass, backing vocals; Scott Travis – drums, percussion; Darren Wharton – keyboards, backing vocals	none – live performances only

== Bibliography ==
- Byrne, Alan (20 September 2015), Are You Ready? Thin Lizzy: Album by Album, London, England: Soundcheck Books, ISBN 978-0992948085
- Doherty, Harry; Gorham, Scott (12 November 2012), Thin Lizzy: The Boys Are Back in Town, Bury St. Edmunds, England: Omnibus Press, ISBN 978-1780384320
- Thomson, Graeme (25 February 2016), Cowboy Song: The Authorised Biography of Philip Lynott, London, England: Hachette UK, ISBN 978-1472121042
