= Thin Lizzy discography =

Cataloguing of published recordings by Thin Lizzy

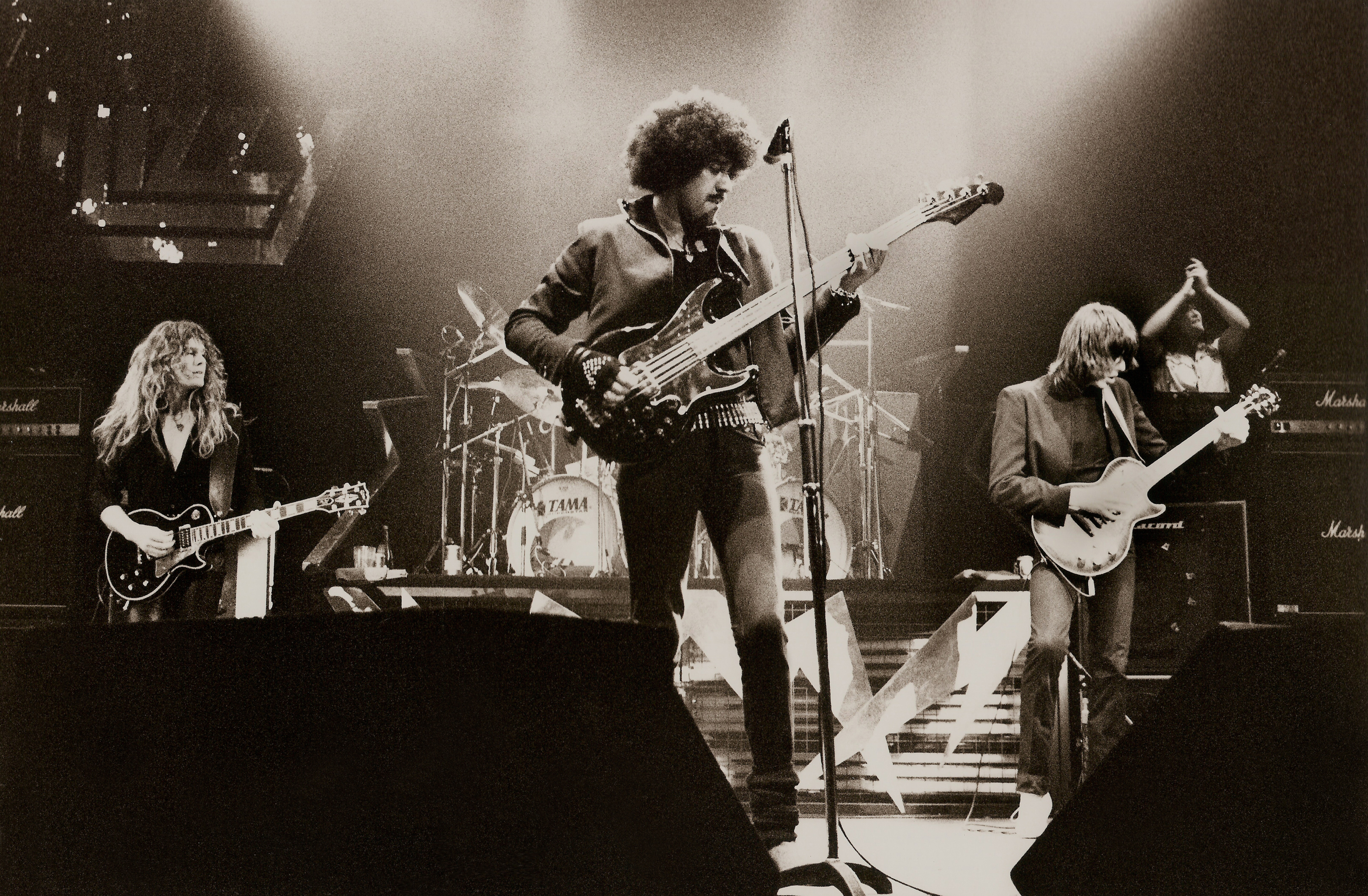
- Thin Lizzy in concert in 1983
- Studio albums: 12
- Extended plays: 7
- Live albums: 12
- Compilation albums: 35
- Singles: 33
- Video albums: 8
- Music videos: 13
- Archive albums: 2

The following is a discography of Thin Lizzy, an Irish hard rock band formed in Dublin in 1969. Originally led by frontman, bass guitarist, songwriter and singer Phil Lynott, their most commercially successful songs are "The Boys Are Back in Town", "Whiskey in the Jar" and "Jailbreak", all major international hits still played regularly on hard rock and classic rock radio stations.

Lynott dissolved Thin Lizzy in 1983, and died in 1986. Several former members reactivated the band in 1994. The current line-up of Thin Lizzy restrict themselves to playing the band's classic material live, and use the name Black Star Riders for recording and performing new material. Thin Lizzy still perform on an occasional basis and the most recent line-up consisted of longtime guitarist Scott Gorham, keyboardist Darren Wharton, and four other members who were not present during the band's main recording career.

== Albums ==
=== Studio albums ===
Title	Album details	Peak chart positions							Certifications
Title	Album details	AUS	UK	US	CAN	NZ	NOR	SWE	Certifications
Thin Lizzy	Released: 30 April 1971; Label: Decca	—	—	—	—	—	—	—	
Shades of a Blue Orphanage	Released: 10 March 1972; Label: Decca	—	—	—	—	—	—	—	
Vagabonds of the Western World	Released: 21 September 1973; Label: Decca	—	—	—	—	—	—	—	
Nightlife	Released: 8 November 1974; Label: Vertigo	—	—	—	—	—	—	—	
Fighting	Released: 12 September 1975; Label: Vertigo	—	60	—	—	—	—	49	
Jailbreak	Released: 26 March 1976; Label: Vertigo	51	10	18	5	—	—	21	CAN: Gold; UK: Gold; US: Gold
Johnny the Fox	Released: October 1976; Label: Vertigo	93	11	52	52	—	—	17	UK: Gold
Bad Reputation	Released: 2 September 1977; Label: Vertigo	58	4	39	44	—	13	9	UK: Gold
Black Rose: A Rock Legend	Released: 13 April 1979; Label: Vertigo	29	2	81	—	48	15	8	UK: Gold
Chinatown	Released: 10 October 1980; Label: Vertigo	16	7	120	—	31	20	13	UK: Silver
Renegade	Released: 20 November 1981; Label: Vertigo	—	38	157	35	—	—	24	
Thunder and Lightning	Released: 4 March 1983; Label: Vertigo	—	4	159	42	—	10	12	UK: Silver
"—" denotes a release that did not chart.

=== Live albums ===
Title	Album details	Chart					Certifications
Title	Album details	AUS	UK	IRE	SWE	US	Certifications
Live and Dangerous	Released: 2 June 1978; Label: Vertigo	20	2	2	27	84	IRE: Gold; UK: Platinum
Life	Released: October 1983; Label: Vertigo	—	29	29	29	185	
BBC Radio One Live in Concert	Released: 12 October 1992; Label: Windsong International	—	—	—	—	—	
Thin Lizzy Live at Sydney Harbour '78	Released: 16 September 1997; Label: Nippon Crown	—	—	—	—	—	
One Night Only	Released: 20 June 2000; Label: CMC International	—	—	—	—	—	
UK Tour '75	Released: 8 September 2008; Label: MLP	—	—	—	—	—	
Still Dangerous	Released: 2 March 2009; Label: VH1 Classic Records	—	98	—	—	189	
Live in London 2011 – 22.01.2011	Released: 22 January 2011; Label: Concert Live	—	—	—	—	—	
Live in London 2011 – 23.01.2011	Released: 23 January 2011; Label: Concert Live	—	—	—	—	—	
High Voltage Festival	Released: 23 July 2011; Label: Concert Live	—	—	—	—	—	
Live 2012 – 29.11.2012	Released: 29 November 2012; Label: Concert Live	—	—	—	—		
Live 2012 – 17.12.2012	Released: 17 December 2012; Label: Concert Live	—	—	—	—	—	
"—" denotes a release that did not chart.

=== Archive albums ===
Title	Album details	Chart (UK)	Notes
The Peel Sessions	Released: 31 October 1994; Label: Strange Fruit	—	All tracks later issued on the At The BBC box set.
At The BBC	Released: 7 November 2011; Label: Universal	—	Eight-disc box set, also available as a two-disc best of.
Rock Legends	Released: 24 October 2020; Label: Universal	71	Six-disc box set with a DVD, all UK singles and various demos.
1976	Released: 27 September 2024; Label: Mercury	—	Six-disc box set featuring remixed versions of Jailbreak and Johnny the Fox, plus outtakes, radio sessions and a live show.
Acoustic Sessions	Released: 24 January 2025; Label: Decca	90	Ten songs from 1971–1973 reworked with new acoustic guitar parts by Eric Bell, alongside the original vocals and drums.

=== Compilation albums ===
Title	Album details	Chart	Certifications	Notes
Title	Album details	UK	Certifications	Notes
The Beginning, Vol 12	Released: 1974; Label: Decca	—	—	Released only in Germany
Remembering – Part 1	Released: August 1976; Label: Decca	—	—	Released simply as Remembering in Germany, where it was released as a 27-track double album.
Rocker (1971–1974)	Released: 1977; Label: London	—	—	Re-released (2007) exclusively in Canada as Black Boys on the Corner (1970–1974) with several differences.
Greatest Hits	Released: 1977; Label: Decca Nova	—	—	Released only in Germany
The Continuing Saga of the Ageing Orphans	Released: September 1979; Label: Decca	—	—	Album contains remixed and altered versions of previously released songs.
Profile	Released: 1979; Label: Decca	—	—	Released only in Germany
The Japanese Compilation Album	Released: 25 February 1980; Label: Vertigo	—	—	Released only in Japan
The Adventures of Thin Lizzy	Released: 27 March 1981; Label: Vertigo	6	—	Also known as The Hit Singles Collection
Lizzy Killers	Released: 1981; Label: Vertigo	—	UK: Silver	Released only in Europe and Australia
V.I.P.	Released: 1981; Label: Vertigo	—	—	Released only in Germany
Whiskey in the Jar	Released: 1981; Label: Decca	—	—	Released only in Germany, entirely different from all other releases with the same title
Rockers	Released: December 1981; Label: Decca	—	—	Originally released only in UK
Thin Lizzy – Die Weisse Serie	Released: 1982; Label: Decca	—	—	Released only in Germany
Whiskey in the Jar	Released: 1983; Label: Karussell	—	—	Released only in Germany, entirely different from all other releases with the same title
The Boys Are Back in Town	Released: November 1983; Label: Pickwick	—	—	Entirely different from all other releases with the same title
The Collection	Released: November 1985; Label: Castle	—	UK: Silver	Not to be confused with other releases with a similar name.
Whiskey in the Jar	Released: April 1986; Label: Pickwick	—	—	Entirely different from all other releases with the same title
Remembering	Released: 1986; Label: Decca	—	—	Released only in Germany, credited as featuring Phil Lynott and Gary Moore
The Best of: Soldier of Fortune	Released: November 1987; Label: Telstar	55	UK: Gold	Credited as Phil Lynott and Thin Lizzy
Lizzy Lives	Released: 1989; Label: Grand Slamm	—	—	Released only in US
Dedication: The Very Best of Thin Lizzy	Released: 4 February 1991; Label: Vertigo	8	—	Also available as a VHS cassette
Best Tracks	Released: 15 June 1991; Label: Vertigo	—	—	4CD set released only in Japan
Wild One: The Very Best of Thin Lizzy	Released: 2 January 1996; Label: PolyGram	18	UK: Gold	Also available in Japan only as a 2CD set
Whiskey in the Jar	Released: 1996; Label: Spectrum	—	UK: Silver	Entirely different from all earlier releases with the same title
Master Series	Released: 1998; Label: Polygram	—	—	Later repackaged as Classic Thin Lizzy, Die Grössten Hits, Millennium Edition, Classic Rock Masters, Colour Collection and Star Club
The Boys Are Back in Town	Released: 6 December 2000; Label: Vertigo	—	—	2CD set released only in Sweden and Denmark (2010)
Vagabonds Kings Warriors Angels	Released: 7 December 2001; Label: Universal	—	—	4CD book / box set
The Hero and the Madman	Released: 12 August 2002; Label: Spectrum	—	—	Released only in Europe
Greatest Hits	Released: 7 June 2004; Label: Universal	3	IRE: 3× Platinum; UK: Platinum	Also available as a DVD.
The Definitive Collection	Released: 20 June 2006; Label: Universal	—	—	Released only in US
The Silver Collection	Released: 4 June 2007; Label: Universal	—	—	Also released as The Rocker
Waiting for an Alibi	Released: 12 April 2011; Label: Spectrum	—	IRE: Platinum; UK: Gold	Released only in UK
Icon	Released: 21 June 2011; Label: Mercury	—	—	Released only in US
Collected	Released: 7 May 2012; Label: Universal	—	—	3CD collection
Essential	Released: 12 June 2020; Label: Universal	16	—	3CD collection

== Extended plays ==
Title	EP details	Chart	Certifications	Notes
Title	EP details	UK	Certifications	Notes
New Day	Released: 20 August 1971; Label: Decca	—	—	Four-track EP
Things Ain't Working Out Down at the Farm	Released: August 1979; Label: Decca	—	—	Three-track EP
Star Trax	Released: 1979; Label: Vertigo	—	—	Four-track EP released only in Australia
Live	Released: February 1981; Label: Vertigo	—	—	Four-track 12-inch EP
Killers Live	Released: 16 April 1981; Label: Vertigo	19	—	Three-track 7-inch EP and four-track 12-inch EP
Rhino Hi-Five: Thin Lizzy	Released: 2006; Label: Rhino	—	—	Collection of five previously released tracks, EP only available for download.
Philip Lynott – The Lost Recordings	Released: 10 August 2006; Label: Hot Press	—	—	Collection of five previously unreleased tracks recorded by Thin Lizzy in 1970 at Trend Studios in Dublin.
"—" denotes a release that did not chart.

== Singles ==
Peak chart positions are shown for the following singles in the following territories. A shaded box indicates that this single was not released in the territory shown. Blank spaces indicate that there is no information available regarding its chart position. A dash indicates a non-charting release. Many of these singles were released in other countries, but chart information is not available.

Year	Single	AUS	UK	US	IRL	GER	CAN	Certifications
1970	"The Farmer"				—			
1972^{1}	"Whiskey in the Jar"	40	6	—	1	7		
1973	"Randolph's Tango"	—	—	—	14			
1973	"The Rocker"	—	—	—	11			
1974	"Little Darling"	—	—	—				
1974	"Philomena"	—	—	—	—	—	—	
1974	"Showdown"	—		—				
1975	"It's Only Money"	—				—		
1975	"Rosalie"	—	—	—	—	—	—	
1975	"Wild One"	—	—	—	—	—	—	
1976	"The Boys Are Back in Town"	56	8	12	1		8	
1976	"Jailbreak"	83	31					
1976	"Cowboy Song"	–		77				
1976	"Don't Believe a Word"	—	12		2			
1976	"Rocky"	—						
1977	"Johnny the Fox Meets Jimmy the Weed"	—						
1977	"Dancing in the Moonlight (It's Caught Me in Its Spotlight)"	59	14		4		84	
1978	"Rosalie/Cowgirl's Song (Medley)"	—	20		14			
1979	"Waiting for an Alibi"	—	9		6			
1979	"Do Anything You Want To"	—	14		25			
1979	"Got to Give It Up"	—						
1979	"Sarah"	—	24		26	—		
1979	"A Merry Jingle" ^{2}	—	28					
1980	"Chinatown"	74	21		12			
1980	"Killer on the Loose"	—	10		5			
1980	"Hey You"	—						
1981	"We Will Be Strong"	—						
1981	"Trouble Boys"	—	53		30			
1982	"Hollywood (Down on Your Luck)"	—	53		—			
1983	"Cold Sweat"	—	27		23			
1983	"Thunder and Lightning"	—	39		22			
1983	"The Sun Goes Down"	—	52					
1991	"Dedication"	—	35		2			
1991	"The Boys Are Back in Town" (re-issue)	—	63		16			BPI: Platinum

Notes

^{1} In some countries, "Whiskey in the Jar" was released in early 1973.
^{2} Credited to "The Greedies" – Lynott, Gorham, Downey, Steve Jones and Paul Cook. This line-up was frequently subtitled as "Thin Lizzy and The Sex Pistols".

== Videography ==
=== Video albums ===
Title	Release details	Chart	Certifications	Notes
Title	Release details	UK	Certifications	Notes
Live and Dangerous	Released: 1981; Label: PolyGram	—	UK Gold	Live at the Rainbow, 1978.
Thin Lizzy Live at Sydney Harbour '78	Released: 1988; Label: Warner Bros.	—	—	Live in Sydney, 29 October 1978.; Also released as The Boys Are Back in Town.
Dedication	Released: 18 February 1991; Label: PolyGram	—	—	Video companion to the 1991 album of the same name.
Rock Masters	Released: 22 January 2003; Label: VAP	—	—	Live in Hitchin, 1983.; Released only in Japan.
At Rockpalast	Released: 23 March 2004; Label: WDR Fernsehen	—	—	Live at Rockpalast, 29 August 1981.
Greatest Hits	Released: 4 July 2005; Label: Mercury	—	UK Gold	Video companion to the 2004 album of the same name.
Thunder and Lightning Tour	Released: 2005; Label: RTÉ	—	—	Live in Dublin, 1983.
Live at the National Stadium, Dublin	Released: 12 March 2012; Label: RTÉ	—	—	Live in Dublin, 1975.

=== Music videos ===
Year	Title	Album
1975	"Wild One"	Fighting
1976	"The Boys Are Back in Town"	Jailbreak
1976	"Don't Believe a Word"	Johnny the Fox
1976	"Johnny the Fox Meets Jimmy the Weed"	Johnny the Fox
1977	"Bad Reputation"	Bad Reputation
1977	"That Woman's Gonna Break Your Heart"	Bad Reputation
1979	"Waiting for an Alibi"	Black Rose: A Rock Legend
1979	"With Love"	Black Rose: A Rock Legend
1979	"Do Anything You Want To"	Black Rose: A Rock Legend
1979	"Sarah"	Black Rose: A Rock Legend
1980	"Chinatown"	Chinatown
1980	"Killer on the Loose"	Chinatown
1991	"Dedication"	Dedication
