= UK Tour =

UK Tour may refer to:

- UK Tour, a snooker tour held from 1997–2000, now called the Q Tour
- UK Tour '75, a Thin Lizzy album
