= One Night Only (Thin Lizzy album) =

Live album by Thin Lizzy
- Released: 20 June 2000
- Recorded: Europe 1999
- Genre: Hard rock, blues rock
- Length: 70:52
- Label: CMC International
- Producer: John Sykes & Scott Gorham

Thin Lizzy live albums chronology
The Boys Are Back in Town: Live in Australia (1997)	One Night Only (2000)	UK Tour '75 (2008)

Professional ratings
Review scores
Source	Rating
AllMusic	2/5 stars

One Night Only is a live album by rock band Thin Lizzy, released in 2000. Thin Lizzy had reformed in 1994 for a series of gigs marking ten years since the band split in 1984. Latter-day Lizzy guitarist John Sykes now took the lead vocal while Marco Mendoza was recruited on bass. The venture was popular enough to be repeated but by the time this album came out, original drummer Brian Downey had decided the affair was too disorganised and retired from the group leaving none of the original trio remaining. Keyboardist Darren Wharton also quit around the time of this album's release. The band, led by Sykes and Scott Gorham, subsequently continued performing with various lineups. This album features ex-Ozzy, Whitesnake, and Black Oak Arkansas drummer Tommy Aldridge.

== Track listing ==
1. "Jailbreak" (Phil Lynott) – 4:41
2. "Waiting for an Alibi" (Lynott) – 3:42
3. "Don't Believe a Word" (Lynott) – 2:38
4. "Cold Sweat" (Lynott, John Sykes) – 3:30
5. "The Sun Goes Down" (Lynott, Darren Wharton) – 7:40
6. "Are You Ready" (Brian Downey, Scott Gorham, Lynott, Brian Robertson) – 3:06
7. "Bad Reputation" (Downey, Gorham, Lynott) – 3:46
8. "Suicide" (Lynott) – 5:54
9. "Still in Love with You" (Lynott) – 8:44
10. "Cowboy Song" (Downey, Lynott) – 5:43
11. "The Boys Are Back in Town" (Lynott) – 5:11
12. "Rosalie" (Bob Seger) – 8:36
13. "Black Rose" (Lynott, Gary Moore) – 7:41

== Personnel ==
Thin Lizzy

- John Sykes – lead vocals, guitars, producer
- Scott Gorham – guitars, vocals, producer
- Darren Wharton – keyboards, vocals
- Marco Mendoza – bass guitar, vocals
- Tommy Aldridge – drums

Production

- Nick Els - engineer, mixing at The Bunker, Los Angeles
