= Thin Lizzy Live at Sydney Harbour '78 =

Album by Thin Lizzy

Video by Thin Lizzy
- Released: 1988
- Recorded: 29 October 1978
- Genre: Hard rock, blues rock
- Length: 40 min.
- Label: Warner Vision

Thin Lizzy video chronology
Live and Dangerous (1980)	Thin Lizzy Live at Sydney Harbour '78 (1988)	Dedication: The Very Best of Thin Lizzy (1991)

Professional ratings
Review scores
Source	Rating
AllMusic	3/5 stars

Thin Lizzy Live at Sydney Harbour '78 was a live concert performance by Thin Lizzy on 29 October 1978, subsequently produced in VHS and DVD format and available from Warner Vision. It was originally a made for television special produced by local radio station 2SM and Australia's Seven Network.

== Background ==
In late 1978, Sydney commercial radio station 2SM staged its annual Rocktober festival, a syndicated “big month” of live outdoor gigs across New South Wales; for the grand finale they coordinated with Irish band Thin Lizzy alongside local groups The Sports, Jon English and Wha-Koo, mounting a purpose-built stage on the Opera House forecourt and teaming with the Seven Network to broadcast the show on television; by offering free admission, 2SM guaranteed a massive crowd to drive both radio ratings and TV audience figures, funding the entire production through sponsorship and on-air advertising rather than ticket sales.

Following a tour of the United States between August and October 1978, which was Gary Moore's first tour as a permanent member of the band, Thin Lizzy embarked upon a six-date tour of Australia and New Zealand during late October. The band's regular drummer Brian Downey was unable to take part in these tours due to the hectic schedule and had taken a break from performing. He later explained his reasons as "exhaustion, and a lack of interest in seeing a stage again for a while". In early August 1978, during rehearsals with a number of drummers including Terry Bozzio, Thin Lizzy had chosen ex-Ian Gillan Band drummer Mark Nauseef to replace Downey. The Sydney concert was Nauseef's penultimate show as a member of Thin Lizzy, as Downey returned to the band in December.

The opening acts for the concert were The Sports, Jon English and Wha-Koo, though these acts do not appear on the CD or some of the video releases.

Thin Lizzy did a morning sound check which extended to a jam of around 25 minutes for those who had arrived extra early for the concert. The band performed for an estimated crowd of 100,000 on the steps of the famous Sydney Opera House.The large crowd was due to the free entry for the concert.

== Video and DVD ==
In 1988, the concert was produced in VHS format by Warner Vision as Thin Lizzy Live at Sydney Harbour '78. It has since been re-released on DVD in several countries under various titles including The Boys Are Back in Town. The audio is English Dolby Digital 2.0 stereo.

== CD ==
The Boys Are Back in Town: Live in Australia

Live album by Thin Lizzy
- Released: 1997
- Recorded: 29 October 1978
- Genre: Hard rock, blues rock
- Length: 42:40
- Label: Nippon Crown

Thin Lizzy live albums chronology
The Peel Sessions (1994)	The Boys Are Back in Town: Live in Australia (1997)	One Night Only (2000)

Professional ratings
Review scores
Source	Rating
AllMusic	2.5/5 stars
Collector's Guide to Heavy Metal	5/10

In 1997, the concert was released in Japan as a CD album titled The Boys Are Back in Town: Live in Australia, on the Nippon Crown label, featuring the same eight tracks as the video.

== Track listing ==
1. "Jailbreak" (Phil Lynott) – 4:30
2. "Bad Reputation" (Brian Downey, Scott Gorham, Lynott) – 3:14
3. "Cowboy Song" (Downey, Lynott) – 5:13
4. "The Boys Are Back in Town" (Lynott) – 5:02
5. "Waiting for an Alibi" (Lynott) – 5:01
6. "Are You Ready" (Downey, Gorham, Lynott, Brian Robertson) – 4:39
7. "Me and the Boys Were Wondering How You and the Girls Are Getting Home Tonight" (Lynott) – 6:18
8. "Baby Drives Me Crazy" (Downey, Gorham, Lynott, Robertson) – 6:23

On June 24, 2022, the entire concert was finally released via Mercury Studios as The Boys Are Back in Town: Live at Sydney Opera House, October 1978, featuring the additional five tracks performed that day: "Still in Love with You", "Warriors", "Johnny the Fox Meets Jimmy the Weed", "Don't Believe a Word" and "Suicide". Released on DVD/CD as a package including the complete 113-minute documentary on Phil Lynott, Songs For While I’m Away (on Blu-ray or DVD), the original multi-tracks were located and remixed, by producer and mix engineer Ben Findlay, to present the entire concert in its original running order. However, the visual quality of the original broadcast and the newly-found tracks are different, so they are sequenced on DVD in both options to view separately or in the original concert order.

== Personnel ==
- Phil Lynott – lead vocals, bass guitar
- Gary Moore – guitars, backing vocals
- Scott Gorham – guitars, backing vocals
- Mark Nauseef – drums
