= BBC Radio One Live in Concert (Thin Lizzy album) =

Live album by Thin Lizzy
- Released: 12 October 1992
- Recorded: 28 August 1983
- Venue: Reading Festival
- Genre: Hard rock, blues rock
- Length: 76:47
- Label: Windsong International
- Producer: Tony Wilson (original recording)

Thin Lizzy live albums chronology
Life (1983)	BBC Radio One Live in Concert (1992)	The Peel Sessions (1994)

Professional ratings
Review scores
Source	Rating
AllMusic	2/5 stars
Collector's Guide to Heavy Metal	8/10

BBC Radio One Live in Concert is a live recording from 1983 by Irish rock band Thin Lizzy, released in 1992. This show at the Reading Festival in 1983 came at the end of their farewell tour, and was originally intended to be the band's last concert.

Although they officially split up in 1983, Thin Lizzy played several more concerts after this recording, including the Monsters of Rock festival in Germany a week later. A similar lineup under the name Grand Slam performed a series of concerts in 1984 and 1985, before Phil Lynott's death in 1986.

== Track listing ==
1. "Jailbreak" (Phil Lynott) – 4:53
2. "Thunder and Lightning" (Brian Downey, Lynott) – 5:00
3. "Waiting for an Alibi" (Lynott) – 3:29
4. "Are You Ready" (Downey, Scott Gorham, Lynott, Brian Robertson) – 2:57
5. "Baby Please Don't Go" (Lynott) – 5:04
6. "A Night in the Life of a Blues Singer" (Lynott) – 6:58
7. "The Holy War" (Lynott) – 5:06
8. "The Sun Goes Down" (Lynott, Darren Wharton) – 5:56
9. "Emerald" (Gorham, Downey, Robertson, Lynott) – 4:11
10. "Cowboy Song" (Downey, Lynott) – 6:09
11. "The Boys Are Back in Town" (Lynott) – 4:44
12. "Suicide" (Lynott) – 5:05
13. "Rosalie Medley: Rosalie/Dancing in the Moonlight/The Cowgirl Song" (Bob Seger/Lynott/ Lynott, Downey) – 8:10
14. "Still in Love with You" (Lynott) – 9:10

== Personnel ==
- Phil Lynott – bass guitar, lead vocals
- Scott Gorham – guitars, backing vocals
- John Sykes – guitars, backing vocals
- Brian Downey – drums, percussion
- Darren Wharton – keyboards, backing vocals
