= Eric Wrixon =

Northern Irish musician (1947–2015)

- Born: 29 June 1947; Belfast, Northern Ireland
- Died: 13 July 2015 (aged 68) Italy
- Genres: Rock
- Occupation: Musician
- Instruments: Keyboards; vocals

Eric Wrixon (29 June 1947 – 13 July 2015) was a musician from Belfast, Northern Ireland, and a founding member of Them and Thin Lizzy. He came up with the band name "Them" (from the 1954 sci-fi film Them!), but as he was a minor his parents declined to sign a recording contract on his behalf and he was replaced in July 1964 prior to recording with the band. By August 1965, he had completed his studies and very briefly returned to Them.

Wrixon was next a member of Belfast R&B group The People and probably played on the two tracks they contributed to the February 1966 compilation album Ireland's Greatest Sounds: Five Top Groups From Belfast's Maritime Club (both tracks featured keyboards). While based in Blackpool, Wrixon left the band in mid-1966 to join another Belfast band, the Wheels, with whom he recorded the single "Kicks" in August 1966.

In 1967, he moved to Germany with The Never Never Band and subsequently joined the Irish Midlands-based pop group The Trixons, who also released several singles in the late 1960s. He quit in 1969, when he and fellow Belfast exile Eric Bell began recruiting a new band from the Dublin musical scene. The result in early 1970 was Thin Lizzy, but Wrixon left in July of that year due to lack of finances and returned to Germany, although he featured on their first single "The Farmer" released that year.

Wrixon briefly joined a reformed Them in Hamburg, recording the 1979 album, Shut Your Mouth but leaving before its promotional tour. In 1993, he formed Them – The Belfast Blues Band – often billed by media and promoters as 'Them' – for "progressive rhythm and blues" live performances throughout Europe (including a 1996 tour), featuring his songs such as "Crazy Woman" and "Marcel's Song". Wrixon later lived in Italy and toured with a line-up including himself (vocals and keyboards), Billy McCoy (guitars), Luca Nardi (bass) and Tom Wagener (drums). The band also recorded a studio album and were planning a live concert DVD.

Wrixon died on 13 July 2015 in Italy at the age of 68.
