= The Peel Sessions (Thin Lizzy album) =

Live album by Thin Lizzy
- Released: 31 October 1994
- Recorded: 1972–77
- Genre: Hard rock, blues rock
- Length: 61:32
- Label: Strange Fruit
- Producer: Tony Wilson, John Walters

Thin Lizzy live albums chronology
BBC Radio One Live in Concert (1992)	The Peel Sessions (1994)	The Boys Are Back in Town: Live in Australia (1997)

Professional ratings
Review scores
Source	Rating
AllMusic	4.5/5 stars
Collector's Guide to Heavy Metal	7/10

The Peel Sessions is an album by Irish band Thin Lizzy, released in 1994. This album consists of a series of recordings made for BBC Radio 1, and originally broadcast on the John Peel show.

== Track listing ==
1. "Whiskey in the Jar" (Trad. arr. Eric Bell, Brian Downey, Phil Lynott) - 5:52
2. "Rosalie" (Bob Seger) - 3:18
3. "Suicide" (Lynott) - 5:20
4. "Emerald" (Lynott, Downey, Scott Gorham, Brian Robertson) - 3:59
5. "Cowboy Song" (Lynott, Downey) - 5:13
6. "Jailbreak" (Lynott) - 4:06
7. "Don't Believe a Word" (Lynott) - 2:48
8. "Little Darling" (Lynott) - 3:07
9. "Still in Love With You" (Lynott) - 5:38
10. "Vagabond of the Western World" (Lynott) - 4:27
11. "Little Girl in Bloom" (Lynott) - 4:42
12. "Killer Without a Cause" (Gorham, Lynott) - 3:41
13. "Bad Reputation" (Downey, Gorham, Lynott) - 2:49
14. "That Woman's Gonna Break Your Heart" (Lynott) - 3:30
15. "Dancing in the Moonlight (It's Caught Me in Its Spotlight)" (Lynott) - 3:22

== Recording dates ==
- Track 1 recorded on 14/11/72
- Tracks 2–3 recorded on 29/5/75
- Tracks 4–6 recorded on 12/2/76
- Track 7 recorded on 23/9/76
- Tracks 8–9 recorded on 4/4/74
- Tracks 10–11 recorded on 31/7/73
- Tracks 12–15 recorded on 1/8/77

== Recording session details ==
- 14/11/72 at Langham 1, London; producer Tony Wilson, engineer Bob Conduct; for ‘John Peel, Sounds of the Seventies’ 28/11/72
- 31/7/73 at Langham 1, London; producer John Walters, engineer unknown; for ‘John Peel, Sounds of the Seventies’ 7/8/73
- 4/4/74 at Langham 1, London; producer Tony Wilson, engineer Bill Aitken; for ‘John Peel, Sounds of the Seventies’ 11/4/74
- 29/5/75 at Maida Vale 4, London; producer Tony Wilson, engineer Bill Aitken; for ‘John Peel ‘with Top Gear’’ 5/6/75
- 12/2/76 at Maida Vale 4, London; producer Tony Wilson, engineer Bill Aitken; for ‘John Peel’ 9/3/76
- 23/9/76 at Maida Vale 4, London; producer Tony Wilson, engineer Bill Aitken; for ‘John Peel’ 11/10/76
- 1/8/77 at Maida Vale 4, London; producer Tony Wilson, engineer Bill Aitken; for ‘John Peel’ 22/8/77

== Personnel ==
- Phil Lynott – bass guitar, vocals
- Brian Downey – drums, percussion
- Scott Gorham – guitars on tracks 2–7, 12–15
- Brian Robertson – guitars on tracks 2–7, 12–15
- Eric Bell – guitars on tracks 1, 10–11
- Gary Moore – guitars, vocals on tracks 8–9
