= Still Dangerous =

Live album by Thin Lizzy
- Released: 2 March 2009
- Recorded: 20 and 21 October 1977
- Venue: Tower Theater, Philadelphia
- Genre: Hard rock, blues rock
- Label: VH1 Classic
- Producer: Glyn Johns, Scott Gorham

Thin Lizzy live albums chronology
| UK Tour '75 (2008) | Still Dangerous (2009) |

Professional ratings
Review scores
| Source | Rating |
|---|---|
| AllMusic | 4/5 stars |
| Metal Hammer (GER) | 6/7 |
| Record Collector | 3/5 stars |

Still Dangerous is a live album by Irish rock band Thin Lizzy. It was compiled from two live concerts by the band at the Tower Theater in Upper Darby Township, Pennsylvania, U.S., just outside of Philadelphia, at 20 and 21 October 1977 during the tour in support of their Bad Reputation album. No overdubs were made to any tracks so the album is completely live. The tracks "Cowboy Song", "The Boys Are Back in Town", "Massacre" and "Emerald" were previously released on the album Live and Dangerous, while "Opium Trail" and "Bad Reputation" were issued on the Killers Live EP in 1981.

"Bad Reputation" and "Emerald" are bonus tracks made only available as downloads outside Japan. They are also available as a bonus 7" 45 RPM single on the U.S. vinyl version of the release.

The live recordings of "Jailbreak", "Cowboy Song", and "The Boys are Back in Town" from this album are available as downloadable content as a Thin Lizzy track pack for the music video game Rock Band.

The album features the common live Thin Lizzy practice of running one song straight into some more popular hit, typically using the ending note of one as the starting note of the next, notably with "Cowboy Song" which finishes with the first note of "The Boys Are Back in Town" and "Soldier of Fortune" which leads directly into "Jailbreak". This live version of "The Boys Are Back in Town" is used over the end credits of the film The Expendables (rather than the more well-known studio version from Jailbreak).

== Track listing ==
1. "Soldier of Fortune" (Phil Lynott) - 5:22
2. "Jailbreak" (Lynott) - 4:28
3. "Cowboy Song" (Brian Downey, Lynott) - 5:04
4. "The Boys Are Back in Town" (Lynott) - 4:46
5. "Dancing in the Moonlight" (Lynott) - 4:08
6. "Massacre" (Downey, Scott Gorham, Lynott) - 3:02
7. "Opium Trail" (Downey, Gorham, Lynott) - 4:51
8. "Don't Believe a Word" (Lynott) - 2:25
9. "Baby Drives Me Crazy" (Downey, Gorham, Lynott, Brian Robertson) - 6:11
10. "Me and the Boys" (Lynott) - 6:48
11. "Bad Reputation" (Downey, Gorham, Lynott) - 4:19
12. "Emerald" (Gorham, Downey, Robertson, Lynott) - 4:35

== Personnel ==
Thin Lizzy

- Phil Lynott – bass guitar, lead vocals
- Scott Gorham – lead and rhythm guitar, backing vocals, producer
- Brian Robertson – lead and rhythm guitar, backing vocals
- Brian Downey – drums, percussion

Additional musicians

- John Earle – saxophone on "Dancing in the Moonlight"

Production

- Glyn Johns - producer, mixing

== Charts ==
| Chart (2009) | Peak position |
|---|---|
| Scottish Albums (OCC) | 87 |
| UK Albums (OCC) | 98 |
| UK Independent Albums (OCC) | 9 |
| US Billboard 200 | 189 |
| US Independent Albums (Billboard) | 30 |
| US Top Tastemaker Albums (Billboard) | 9 |
