= Andy Gee =

German guitarist and musician (born 1950)

- Born: Andreas Gröber; 22 September 1950 (age 76); Berlin, West Germany
- Genres: Rock; house
- Occupations: Musician; singer-songwriter
- Instrument: Guitar
- Years active: 1962–present
- Website: Hot Property Music

Andy Gee (born Andreas Gröber, 22 September 1950 in Berlin) is a German guitarist and musician, best known for his time with Peter Bardens, Steve Ellis and as a temporary member of Thin Lizzy.

== Career ==
Gee began playing guitar in 1958, and was a member of a school band in the early 1960s. After passing through a number of Frankfurt groups, he moved to Ireland in 1967. He joined Irish showband The Nights in 1968, and subsequently played and toured with British band Springfield Park. He then teamed up with Pete Bardens, and played on his 1969 album, The Answer, also featuring Peter Green. Gee also featured on Bardens' follow-up album, Write My Name in the Dust. In 1970, Gee joined Follow the Buffalo, and the following year he teamed up with Steve Ellis and his new band Ellis. Ellis recorded two albums in the early 1970s, Riding on the Crest of a Slump and Why Not?, before splitting up.

In 1974, after Gary Moore had left Thin Lizzy, Phil Lynott was looking for two temporary guitarists to replace Moore for a tour of Germany. He chose Gee and ex-Atomic Rooster member John Cann. During the tour, Gee and Lynott reworked a then-unreleased track, "Suicide", from the single-guitar piece that the band had played with Eric Bell, into a dual-guitar arrangement. The track later surfaced on the Fighting album in 1975, with Scott Gorham playing Gee's parts. After the tour had ended, Gee helped Thin Lizzy audition for new guitarists, but was not considered for a permanent role as he was still under contract to a different record company.

Gee subsequently moved to Canada, and played with Avenir and Fighter, and also worked as a session musician on soundtracks for commercials. Moving back to London in 1983, he formed his own groups, Exit, and later Scandal, the latter with Reg Isidore. After this he worked for an independent music publishing company until 1994, and then switched genres to house music, releasing several solo albums and working with various notable musicians and DJs, including Chris Westbrook, Byron Burke and Marshall Jefferson. He is still an independent music publisher, and still records.

== Discography ==
=== With Pete Bardens ===
- The Answer (1969)
- Write My Name in the Dust (1971)

=== With Follow the Buffalo ===
- Follow the Buffalo (1970)

=== With Ellis ===
- Riding on the Crest of a Slump (1972)
- Why Not? (1973)

=== With Avenir ===
- Avenir (1975)

=== Solo (incomplete) ===
- Black Kettle's Revenge
- In the Face of Adversity
- Spirit Higher
- Take a Trip with Me
