= Thin Lizzy =

Irish rock band

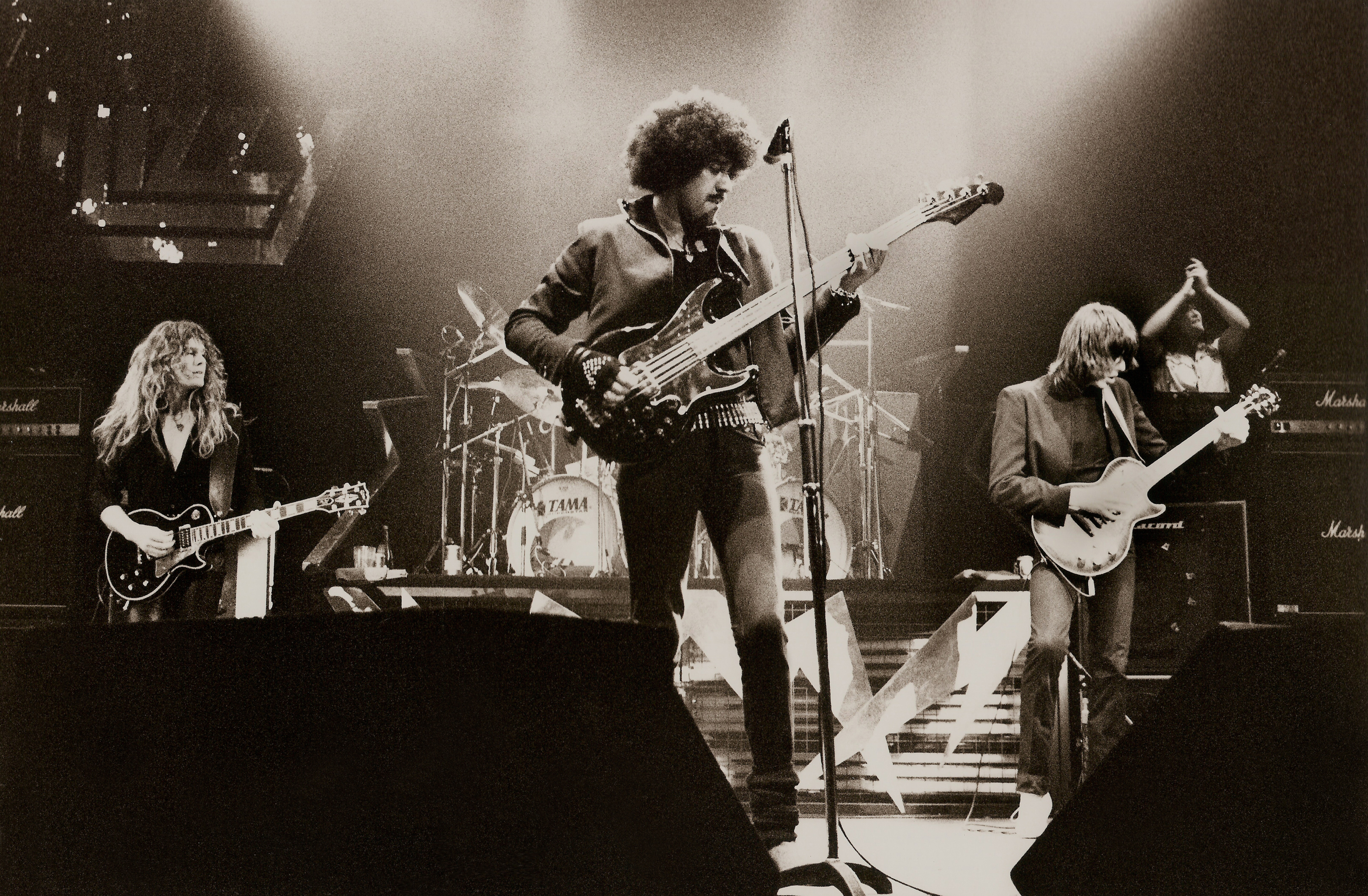
- Thin Lizzy performing in 1983 (left to right): John Sykes, Phil Lynott, Scott Gorham and Darren Wharton. (Brian Downey not visible)

Background information
- Origin: Dublin, Ireland
- Genres: Hard rock; blues rock; heavy metal; folk rock (early)
- Works: Discography
- Years active: 1969–1983 • 1994–2019
- Labels: Decca; Vertigo; Mercury (US); BMG; EMI; Deram; Warner Bros. (US)
- Spinoffs: Funky Junction; Grand Slam; Wild Horses; Blue Murder; Dare; 21 Guns; Black Star Riders
- Past members: Eric Bell; Brian Downey; Phil Lynott; Eric Wrixon; Gary Moore; Brian Robertson; Snowy White; John Sykes; Scott Gorham; Darren Wharton; Ricky Warwick; Damon Johnson; Scott Travis; Troy Sanders; see also list
- Website: thinlizzyofficial.com

Thin Lizzy were an Irish rock band formed in Dublin in 1969. The band initially consisted of bass guitarist, lead vocalist, and principal songwriter Phil Lynott, drummer Brian Downey, guitarist Eric Bell, and organist Eric Wrixon, although Wrixon left after a few months. Bell left at the end of 1973 and was briefly replaced by Gary Moore, who himself was replaced in mid-1974 by dual lead guitarists: Scott Gorham, who remained with the band until their break-up in 1983, and Brian Robertson, who remained with the band until 1978 when Moore re-joined. Moore left a second time and was replaced by Snowy White in 1980, who was himself replaced by John Sykes in 1982. The line-up was augmented by keyboardist Darren Wharton in 1980.

The singles "Whiskey in the Jar" (1972), "The Boys Are Back in Town" (1976) and "Waiting for an Alibi" (1979) were international hits, and several Thin Lizzy albums reached the top ten in the UK. The band's music reflects a wide range of influences including blues, soul music, psychedelic rock, and traditional Irish folk music, but is generally classified as hard rock or sometimes heavy metal. Lynott led the group throughout their fourteen-year recording career of twelve studio albums, writing or co-writing almost all the band's material. He was the first Black Irishman to achieve commercial success in the field of rock music. Thin Lizzy featured several guitarists throughout their history, with Downey and Lynott as the rhythm section on the drums and bass guitar. As well as being multiracial, the band drew their early members not only from both sides of the Irish border but from both the Catholic and Protestant communities during The Troubles.

After Lynott's death in 1986, various incarnations of the band emerged over the years based initially around guitarists Gorham and Sykes although Sykes left the band in 2009. Gorham later continued with a new line-up that included Downey. In 2012, Gorham and Downey decided against recording new material as Thin Lizzy so a new band, Black Star Riders, was formed to tour and produce new releases. Thin Lizzy have since reunited for occasional concerts.

Rolling Stone magazine describes the band as distinctly hard rock, "far apart from the braying mid-70s metal pack". AllMusic critic John Dougan wrote, "As the band's creative force, Lynott was a more insightful and intelligent writer than many of his ilk, preferring slice-of-life working-class dramas of love and hate influenced by Bob Dylan, Bruce Springsteen and virtually all of the Irish literary tradition."

== History ==
=== Pre-formation ===
Two of the founding members of Thin Lizzy, bass guitarist and vocalist Phil Lynott and drummer Brian Downey, met while at school in Dublin in the early 1960s. Lynott, born on 20 August 1949 in West Bromwich, England, to an Irish mother Philomena (1930–2019) and Guyanese father Cecil Parris (1925–2010), was brought up in Dublin from the age of three. Downey was born on 27 January 1951 in Dublin. Lynott joined local band the Black Eagles as vocalist in 1963, and Downey was recruited as drummer in 1965. In 1967, Lynott was asked to join Skid Row by bass guitarist Brush Shiels, who brought teenage Belfast guitarist Gary Moore into the band early in 1968. After a disappointing television appearance in June 1969, Shiels fired Lynott, although they remained on good terms and Shiels subsequently taught Lynott to play bass guitar. Lynott then formed Orphanage with Downey on drums after Downey's previous band, Sugar Shack, had split.

Guitarist Eric Bell, born in Belfast on 3 September 1947, began his career playing in local bands such as the Deltones, Shades of Blue and the Bluebeats, and the last incarnation of Them to feature Van Morrison, between September and October 1966. Bell then moved to Dublin and joined Irish showband the Dreams, but left in 1969 with a view to forming a rock band. An acquaintance of Bell's, Belfast organist Eric Wrixon, also a former member of Them, had also moved to Dublin and joined the showband circuit, but had similar plans to progress towards rock music.

=== Early years (1969–1972) ===
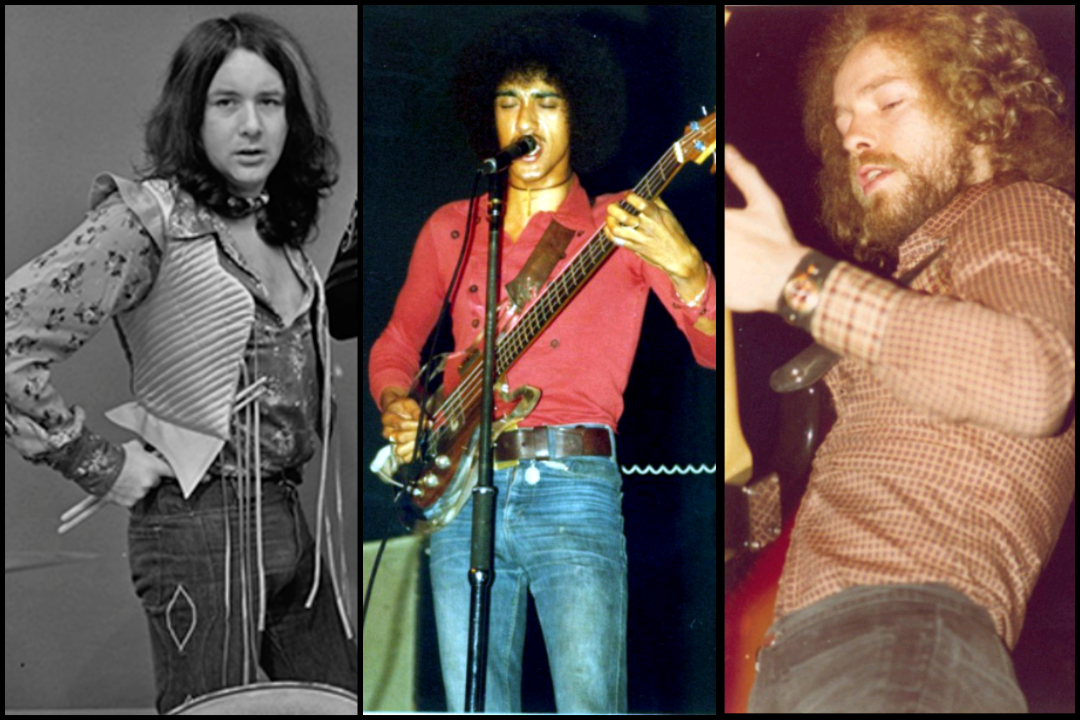
Brian Downey, Phil Lynott and Eric Bell, three of the four founding members of Thin Lizzy

In December 1969, Bell and Wrixon met by chance in a pub in Dublin and found that they shared similar ideas of forming a band, and decided to visit the Countdown Club where they saw Lynott and Downey perform with Orphanage. Lynott was not playing bass guitar at this time, but Bell was particularly impressed by Downey, and introduced himself to Lynott and Downey during a break. When Bell asked if they would consider forming a band together, Downey was initially sceptical, but both men were aware of Bell's musical reputation. They agreed that night on condition that Lynott play bass guitar as well as sing, and that the band would perform some of Lynott's compositions. Bell later said, "From there on in we were a band." Wrixon was also included as organist in the as yet unnamed band, making the initial line-up a quartet. The following week, Lynott visited Bell at his flat and played him recordings of some of his own songs. Bell was impressed: "They were so good. I knew right away I could put my guitar style into them."

The band began to attract attention in the Irish music press almost immediately, as the band began rehearsals in January 1970. On 1 January, New Spotlight magazine announced that Bell and Wrixon were to be a part of a new band. By early February, the press had begun to question the delay in any public announcement of the "Bell-Lynott supergroup". The name Thin Lizzy was announced to the press on 18 February. The name came from an idea by Bell about a robot character in The Dandy called Tin Lizzie, which they adjusted to Thin Lizzy as a playful reference to the local Dublin accent, in which "thin" would be pronounced as "t'in". For some of their early gigs, the band were mistakenly promoted as "Tin Lizzy" or "Tin Lizzie". The group's first gig was at a school hall in Cloghran, near Dublin Airport, in 1970, though sources vary on the date from 16 February, 19 February, and 20 February.

In July 1970, the band released a single, "The Farmer"/"I Need You", on EMI with the B-side written by John D'ardis, who owned Trend Studios where the single was recorded. The single sold just 283 copies and is now a collector's item. Wrixon left the band before the single's release, meaning there was a greater share of income for the three remaining members. He moved to mainland Europe before returning to Belfast, rejoining his old band, Them. Wrixon died on 13 July 2015.

By the end of the year, Thin Lizzy were signed to Decca Records by their manager, Brian Tuite, and they travelled to London in January 1971 to record their debut album, Thin Lizzy. The album sold moderately well, but did not chart in the UK despite airplay and support from influential DJs John Peel and Kid Jensen. Around March 1971, the band permanently relocated to London, before the release of the unsuccessful "New Day" EP in August. Despite poor sales, Decca agreed to finance the band's second album Shades of a Blue Orphanage, released in March 1972. Like the previous LP, the songs were filled with Lynott's personal anecdotes and references to his life in Dublin and the people he knew there. Musically the style was Celtic, with little warning of the hard rock direction that the band were to take in the future. This album also did not chart in the UK.

In mid-1972, Thin Lizzy were asked to record an album of Deep Purple covers. Vocals and keyboards were handled by members of another band, Elmer Fudd, and a few instrumental tracks composed by the band were also included, including Bell playing the traditional "Danny Boy" in the style of Jimi Hendrix. The album was issued as being by Funky Junction, with no mention of Thin Lizzy. It was released as Funky Junction Play a Tribute to Deep Purple in January 1973.

=== "Whiskey in the Jar" (1972–1974) ===
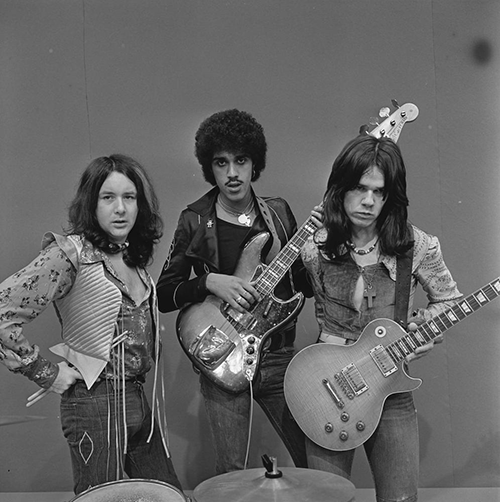
Thin Lizzy in early 1974 on TopPop; L–R: Brian Downey, Phil Lynott, and Gary Moore

In late 1972, the band embarked upon a high-profile tour of the UK with Slade, who were enjoying a string of hit singles at the time, and Suzi Quatro. Around the same time, Decca released Thin Lizzy's version of a traditional Irish ballad, "Whiskey in the Jar", as a single. The band was angry at the release, feeling that the song did not represent their sound or their image, but the single topped the Irish chart, and reached No. 6 in the UK in February 1973, resulting in an appearance on Top of the Pops. It also charted in many countries across Europe. However, the follow-up single, "Randolph's Tango", was a return to Lynott's more obscure work, and it did not chart outside Ireland.

The band's next album, Vagabonds of the Western World, was released in September 1973 following strong airplay in the UK, but again failed to chart. The accompanying single "The Rocker" also found little success outside Ireland, and the momentum gained from their hit single was lost. Towards the end of 1973, Eric Bell began to feel constricted with the changing style of the group, which left less room for free-form jamming and had people wanting the band to create a follow-up hit to "Whiskey in the Jar". Matters came to a head during a gig on New Year's Eve 1973 at Queen's University Belfast, where he walked off stage halfway through the show and had to be persuaded to finish the set. The next day, he quit the group, and was immediately replaced by ex-Skid Row guitarist Gary Moore to help finish the tour. Moore stayed until April 1974; the band recorded three songs with him in that time, including the version of "Still in Love with You" that was included on the fourth album Nightlife. He left the group after being concerned about his health and struggling to compete with Lynott for control, and formed Colosseum II with Jon Hiseman.

With the departure of Moore, Lynott decided to expand the line-up with two guitarists, and recruited two new members to complete a tour of Germany in May 1974. These were ex-Atomic Rooster and Hard Stuff guitarist John Cann, and Berlin-born Andy Gee, who had played with Peter Bardens and Ellis. This lineup proved to be temporary, as Lynott and Cann did not get on personally, and Gee was under contract to another record label. The tour was ended early when a disillusioned Downey quit the band, and had to be begged to reconsider, at a time when Thin Lizzy's contract with Decca was coming to an end.

Auditions were held for new members, and Lynott and Downey eventually settled on 18-year-old Glaswegian guitarist Brian Robertson, and Californian Scott Gorham. The new line-up gelled quickly, dropped most of the old songs when they played live, and secured a new record deal with Phonogram, but the resulting album Nightlife was a disappointment for the band due to its soft production and underdeveloped style. Robertson described Ron Nevison's production as "pretty naff" and Gorham said the record was "ridiculously tame". Like the previous three albums, it failed to chart, selling around 10,000 copies.

=== "The Boys Are Back in Town" (1975–1977) ===
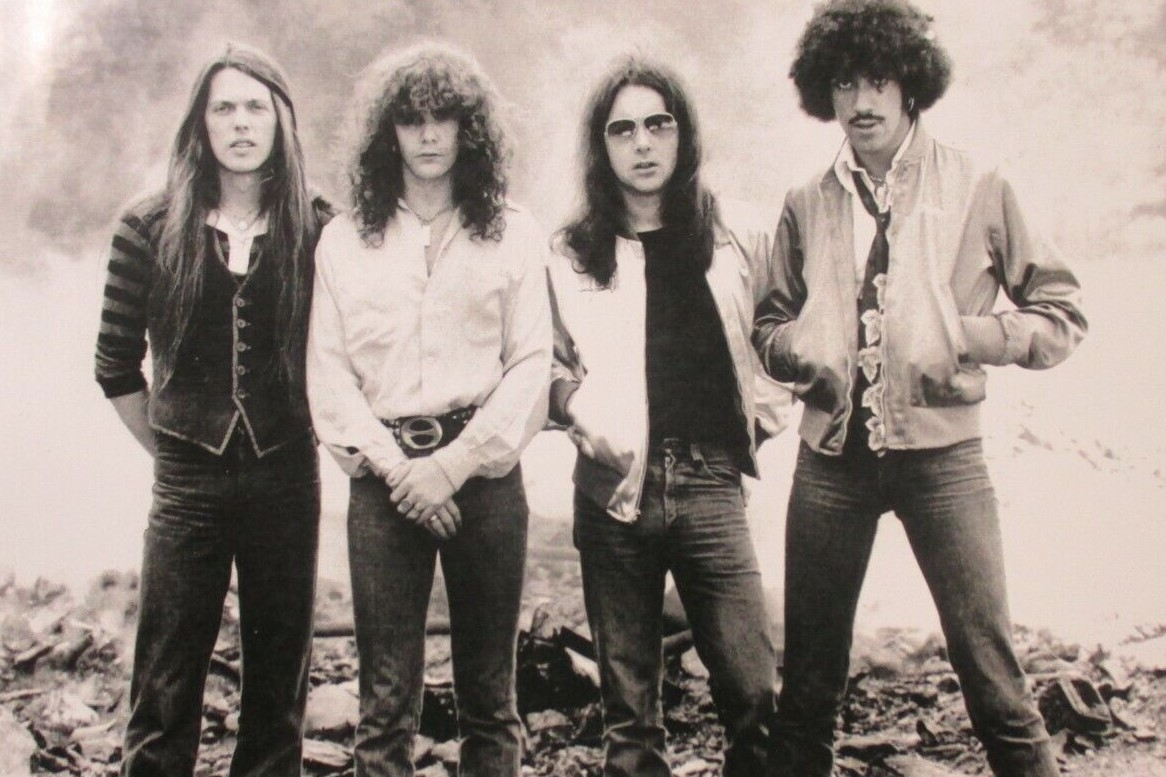
L–R: Scott Gorham, Brian Robertson, Brian Downey, and Phil Lynott, promotional photo, 1977

In early 1975, Thin Lizzy toured the United States for the first time, in support of Bob Seger and Bachman–Turner Overdrive (BTO). When BTO toured Europe later in the year to support their hit single "You Ain't Seen Nothing Yet", Thin Lizzy again accompanied them on what was a very high-profile tour. They then recorded the Fighting album, which became the first Thin Lizzy album to chart in the UK, reaching No. 60, although the singles still did not chart. Opening with Seger's "Rosalie", the album showed the first real evidence of the twin guitar sound that would lead the band towards their greatest successes, particularly with the dual harmonies of "Wild One" and both guitarists' soloing on "Suicide".

After a successful multi-band tour in support of Status Quo, the band recorded the album Jailbreak, which proved to be their breakthrough record. Released on 26 March 1976, it featured the worldwide hit "The Boys Are Back in Town" which reached No. 8 in the UK, and No. 12 in the US, their first charting record in that country. The album also charted well on both sides of the Atlantic, reaching No. 10 in the UK and No. 18 in the US, and the follow-up single, "Jailbreak", also performed well. The twin guitar sound had been fully developed by this time and was in evidence throughout the album, particularly on the hit single, and other tracks such as "Emerald", "Warriors" and "Cowboy Song". The album is considered to have financially secured the band, not only enabling them to survive and continue, but also be able to feel the freedom needed to be able to experiment with higher concept thought and Lynott's more lyrically challenging pieces that the group went on to pen. Thin Lizzy toured the US in support of various bands such as Aerosmith, Rush and REO Speedwagon, and they planned to tour there again in June 1976, this time with Rainbow. However, Lynott fell ill with hepatitis and the tour was cancelled, which set them back a few months.

While Lynott was ill, he wrote most of the following album, Johnny the Fox. The album was recorded in August 1976 and the sessions began to reveal tensions between Lynott and Robertson; for example, there was disagreement over the composition credits of the hit single "Don't Believe a Word". Lynott was still drawing on Celtic mythology and his own personal experiences for lyric ideas, which dominated Johnny the Fox and the other albums of Thin Lizzy's successful mid-1970s period. The tour to support the album was very successful and there were further high-profile TV appearances, such as the Rod Stewart BBC TV Special.

An important tour of the US in December 1976 had to be cancelled when Brian Robertson's hand was injured by a broken bottle during a fight at The Speakeasy Club in London, the night before the band were due to fly. Robertson maintains that, contrary to reports at the time, he was not drunk and had only gone to the venue for a meal. Lynott was angry and replaced Robertson with Gary Moore for another tour of the States in January–March 1977, this time supporting Queen. The tour was a success and Lynott asked Moore to stay on, but he returned to his previous band, Colosseum II. Robertson had not been sacked but was unsure of his position and made plans to start another band with Jimmy Bain of Rainbow. Before the American tour, Lynott had also invited Irish guitarist Jimi Slevin to "try out a few things" with Thin Lizzy, prompting speculation that the ex-Skid Row member could replace Robertson.

Thin Lizzy flew to Canada in May 1977 as a trio to record Bad Reputation, with Gorham handling all the guitar parts. A month into the sessions, at Gorham's urging, Robertson joined them, in his own words, "as a session player" and in Lynott's words, "as a guest". Robertson added lead guitar tracks to three songs as well as rhythm guitar and keyboards, and was officially reinstated in July. The album was released in September and sold well, reaching No. 4 in the UK, after a successful single, "Dancing in the Moonlight (It's Caught Me in Its Spotlight)". Also in 1977, Thin Lizzy headlined the Reading Festival, and played Dalymount Park on 21 August.

=== Live and Dangerous and the return of Gary Moore (1978–1979) ===
In 1978, Thin Lizzy released their first live album Live and Dangerous. There is some disagreement over just how much of the album is actually recorded live – producer Tony Visconti claimed that the only parts that were not overdubbed were the drums and the audience. However Brian Robertson has disputed this, saying that he had refused Lynott's request to re-record a guitar solo, and that the only overdubs were backing vocals and some guitar parts by Gorham. He added, "It's just not true. The only reason we said that it was recorded all over was obviously for tax reasons... so everything that Visconti claims is bollocks." Gorham concurs, stating that he attempted to re-record a solo but could not recreate the live sound, adding, "I re-did one rhythm track and a few backing vocals. But that's it." The album was a huge success, reaching No. 2 in the UK, and was ranked as the best live album of all time by Classic Rock magazine in 2004. The permanent departure of Robertson occurred some time after a gig in Ibiza on 6 July 1978, the disagreements with Lynott having reached a breaking point. (Robertson then teamed up with Jimmy Bain to front their new band, Wild Horses.)

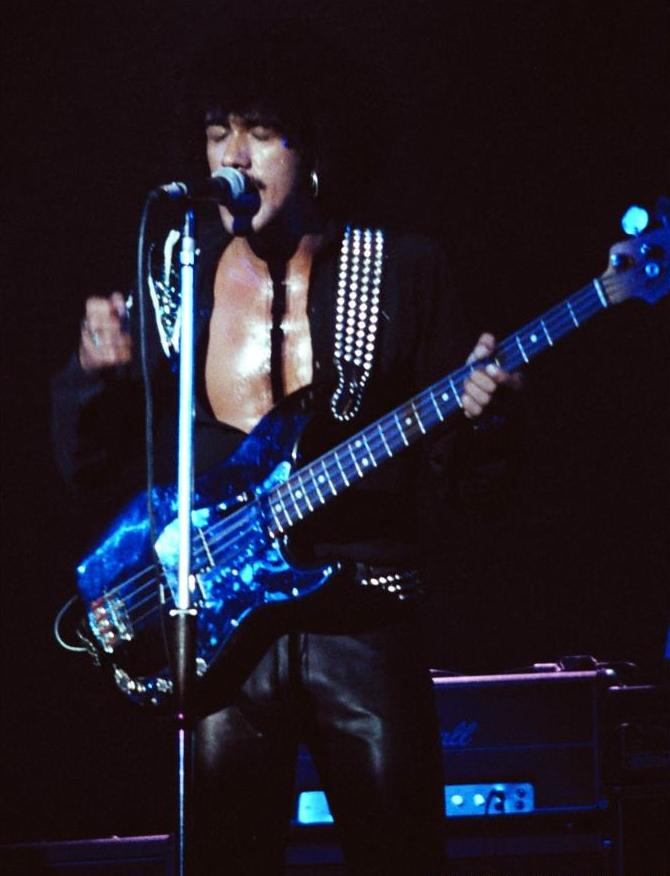
Phil Lynott in 1978

Lynott replaced Robertson with Gary Moore again, and around this time the band loosely joined forces with Steve Jones and Paul Cook of the Sex Pistols, and also with Chris Spedding and Jimmy Bain, to form The Greedy Bastards, who played a small number of gigs playing a varied selection of songs. In this way Lynott was able to align his band with the punk movement and avoid being tagged as a 'dinosaur' as many other 1970s rock bands had been. Other occasional members of The Greedy Bastards included Bob Geldof and Pete Briquette of the Boomtown Rats.

The band began another tour of the US in August of 1978, followed by a trip to Australia and New Zealand. Brian Downey did not accompany them, having contracted pneumonia and preferring to spend some time in Ireland. He was replaced for the tour by American drummer Mark Nauseef. On their return, Downey rejoined the band and at the beginning of 1979 they recorded Black Rose: A Rock Legend in Paris. The sessions were marked by the increasing drug habits of Lynott and Gorham, and the general presence of drugs around the band. This also showed in the subject matter on the album, in songs such as "Got to Give It Up". Celtic influences remained, however, particularly in the album closer "Róisín Dubh", a seven-minute medley of traditional Irish songs given a twin guitar rock veneer. Two singles, "Waiting for an Alibi" and "Do Anything You Want To", were successful, and the album reached No. 2 in the UK. A third, moderately successful single, "Sarah" was Lynott's ode to his new-born daughter.

However, on 4 July 1979, after playing their Day on the Green set in Oakland, Gary Moore abruptly left Thin Lizzy in the middle of another tour. Years later, Moore said he had no regrets about walking out, "but maybe it was wrong the way I did it. I could've done it differently, I suppose. But I just had to leave." He subsequently pursued his solo career, releasing several successful albums. He had collaborated with Lynott and Downey on his 1978 album Back on the Streets and the hit single "Parisienne Walkways" before leaving Thin Lizzy, and in 1985 he and Lynott teamed up again on the UK No. 5 single "Out in the Fields". Gary Moore died of a heart attack in Estepona, Spain, on 6 February 2011, aged 58.

After Moore's departure, Thin Lizzy continued the tour for a few nights as a trio before Lynott brought in Midge Ure to replace him on a temporary basis. Ure had prior plans to join Ultravox, but had co-written a song, "Get Out of Here", with Lynott on Black Rose: A Rock Legend, and agreed to help Thin Lizzy complete their touring commitments. He also contributed guitar parts for The Continuing Saga of the Ageing Orphans, a compilation album of remixed and overdubbed versions of Eric Bell-era tracks. On their return to the UK, the band were to headline the Reading Festival for the second time on 25 August 1979, but had to cancel due to the disruption within the line-up.

Before a tour of Japan beginning in September, Lynott decided to bring in another guitarist, Dave Flett, who had played with Manfred Mann's Earth Band, to enable Ure to switch to playing keyboards where necessary. The tour was completed successfully, but the line-up now contained two temporary members, and Lynott was spending a lot of time on projects outside Thin Lizzy, including composing and producing material for other bands, as well as putting together his first solo album, Solo in Soho. Lynott also reactivated The Greedy Bastards, who released a one-off Christmas single, "A Merry Jingle", in December 1979 as simply The Greedies. With the group now composed of Lynott, Gorham and Downey with Sex Pistols Jones and Cook, the single reached No. 28 in the UK.

=== Later years and break-up (1980–1983) ===
While Lynott searched for a permanent guitarist, he and the other members of Thin Lizzy, past and present, worked on Solo in Soho which was released in April 1980, and the next Thin Lizzy album, Chinatown. Lynott got married on 14 February, and his wife gave birth to a second daughter in July. Dave Flett had hoped to be made a permanent member of Thin Lizzy but Lynott chose Snowy White, who had played with Pink Floyd and Peter Green. Ure was still acting as a temporary keyboard player at gigs during early 1980, but was replaced by Darren Wharton in April, shortly after White joined the band. Wharton was only 18 at the time and was initially hired on a temporary basis. This new line-up completed the Chinatown album between short tours, and two singles were released from it. The first, "Chinatown", reached No. 21 in the UK, but the second, "Killer on the Loose", reached the top 10 amid much adverse publicity due to the ongoing activities of serial killer Peter Sutcliffe, known as "The Yorkshire Ripper".

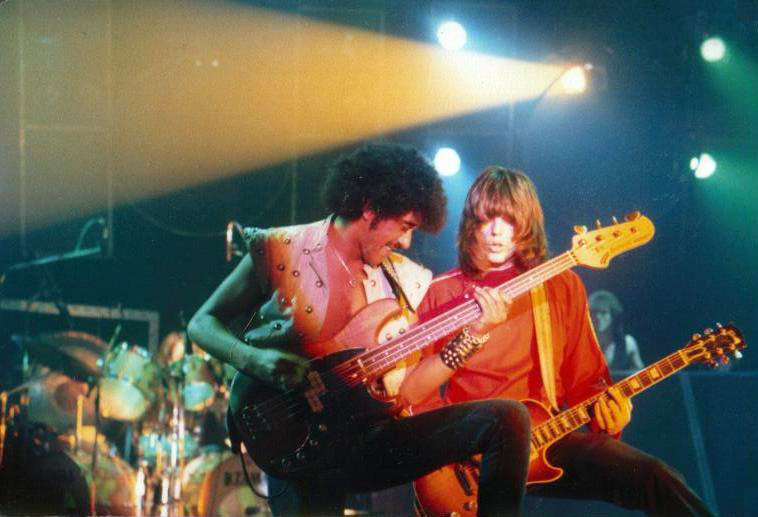
Thin Lizzy in concert, 1981

Chinatown was finally released in October 1980, and reached No. 7 in the UK, but by this time Thin Lizzy albums were not even reaching the top 100 in the US. After a successful tour of Japan and Australia, the band undertook what was to be their final tour of the US in late 1980. At the beginning of 1981, Lynott began work on his second solo album, using Thin Lizzy members among a large group of backing musicians. Around the same time, the band were recording material for the next Thin Lizzy album, and as before, the sessions seemed to merge to the extent that musicians were not always sure which album they were working on. Producer for the Thin Lizzy sessions, Chris Tsangarides, stated, "The feeling of confusion was in the air in that sometimes nobody knew if they were working on a Phil solo record or a Lizzy album." Snowy White had previously felt that, as a member of Thin Lizzy, he should have been paid as a session player to appear on Lynott's solo recordings.

In April 1981, the band's first 'greatest hits' album was released, and The Adventures of Thin Lizzy reached No. 6 in the UK, although a stand-alone single, "Trouble Boys", only reached No. 53, the band's worst chart placing since 1975. According to White and Wharton, Lynott was the only person who wanted to release it, and nobody else liked the song. "Trouble Boys" had even been pencilled in as the title for the new album, but the single's chart failure resulted in the song being dropped from the album and the title changed to Renegade. One highlight for the band at this time was headlining the first-ever Slane Castle concert on 16 August, with support from Kirsty MacColl, Hazel O'Connor and U2.

Lynott's second solo album, The Philip Lynott Album, was delayed until 1982 while Renegade was completed and released in November 1981. Renegade was not successful, only reaching No. 38 in the UK and No. 157 in the US. A single, "Hollywood (Down on Your Luck)", also flopped, although it did reach No. 24 on the US Mainstream Rock chart. Only two songs from the album were written solely by Lynott, with the other members of the band contributing more to the compositions. Both Gorham and Wharton have since stated their dissatisfaction with some of the songs, such as "Angel of Death", "Fats" and "Mexican Blood". Wharton was omitted from the band photos on the back of the record sleeve, despite the fact that he was by this time a permanent member of the band. "It hurt me a great deal", he later said.

==== Thunder and Lightning ====
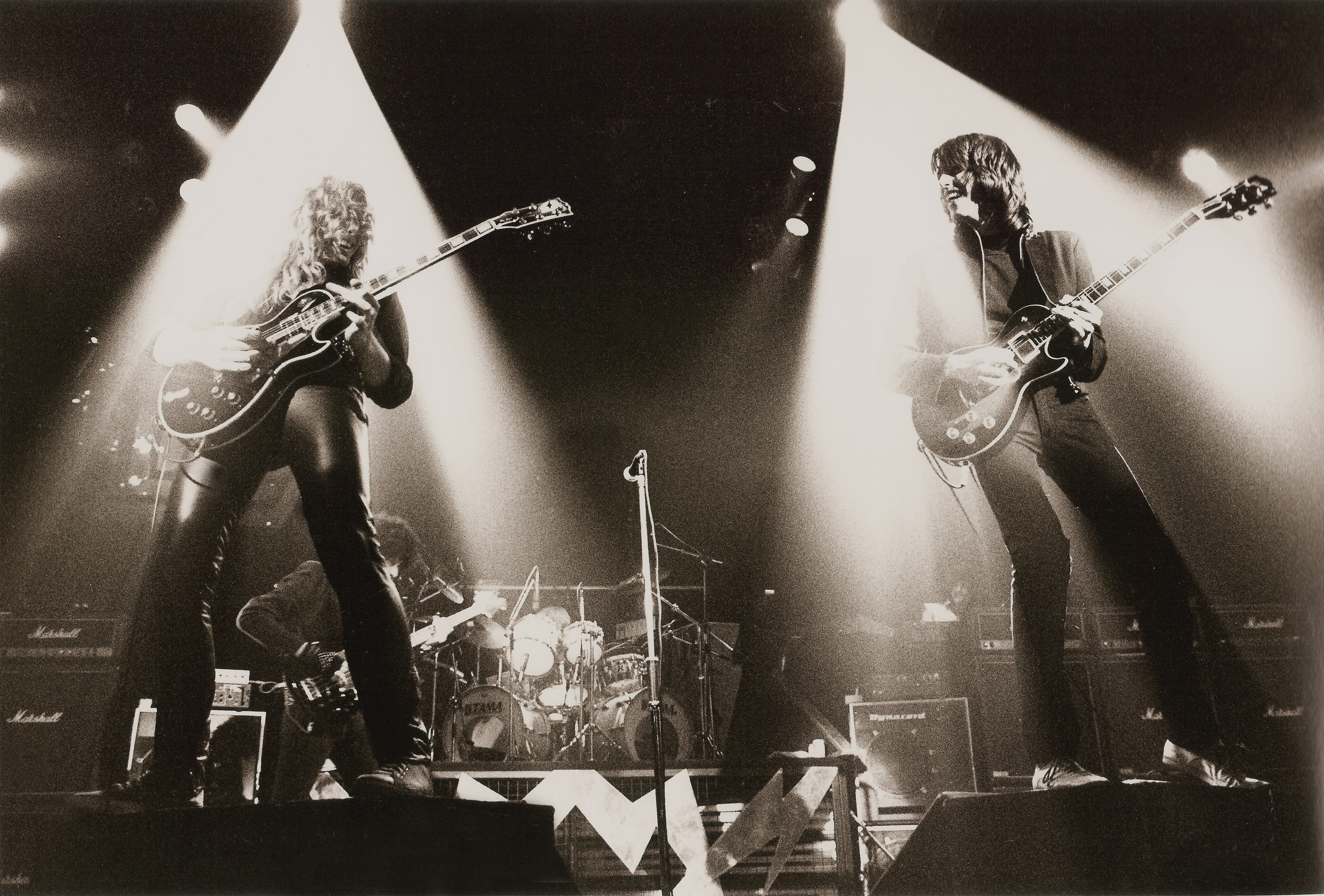
Thin Lizzy performing in 1983, with Sykes and Gorham on guitar

The beginning of 1982 was marred by both Downey and Gorham having to take breaks from the European tour to recover from personal problems. Downey was involved in a fight in a nightclub in Denmark in February, and Gorham was suffering from drug-induced exhaustion. Downey missed five concerts, and was replaced by Mark Nauseef again for three of them, and by Mike Mesbur of support band The Lookalikes for the other two. In March, Gorham collapsed and returned home; eight concerts were performed as a quartet and six others were postponed.

Later in the year, Lynott went on a solo tour and released his second solo album, which did not sell particularly well. Snowy White left the band in August 1982, having tired of the disorganised schedules and Lynott's drug problems, although by his own admission he was too restrained and quiet to fit in well with his more raucous bandmates. White went on to achieve top ten chart success in the UK with his single "Bird of Paradise" in 1983. Long-time co-manager Chris O'Donnell also left at this time, later stating, "A once-brilliant band was turning to crap before my very eyes."

Lynott wanted to find a replacement for White before starting to record the next album, which would turn out to be the band's last. By September 1982, after some unsuccessful rehearsals with Dutch guitarist Adrian Vandenberg, he had settled on John Sykes who had been a member of Tygers of Pan Tang and recorded "Please Don't Leave Me" single with members of Thin Lizzy. Sykes co-wrote the first single from the album, "Cold Sweat", although the rest of the album had already been written. Thunder and Lightning was released in March 1983, and was much more successful than its predecessor, reaching No. 4 in the UK, although it charted even worse than its predecessor in the US, reaching only No. 159, making it the band's worst charting album in the US. Sykes' presence had rejuvenated the band musically, the composing credits were evenly shared, and the style had grown much heavier, veering towards heavy metal.

The tour to support the album was to be a farewell tour, although Lynott was not convinced that this would be the end of the band. Sykes wanted to continue, although Gorham had had enough. The tour was successful, and some concerts were recorded to compile a live album. Partway into the tour, many of Thin Lizzy's past guitarists were invited onstage to contribute to some of the songs they had originally recorded, the only exception being Snowy White, who reportedly declined the invitation. The album was released in October 1983 as Life, which included older performances of "Renegade", "Hollywood (Down on Your Luck)" and "Killer on the Loose", featuring White, and reached No. 29 in the UK. The tour continued while two more singles were released, the last of them, "The Sun Goes Down", only reaching No. 52 in August. Lynott also undertook another solo tour, accompanied by Downey and Sykes, under the name of The Three Musketeers.

After a difficult leg of the tour in Japan, where some members of the band had difficulty obtaining heroin, Thin Lizzy played their final UK concert before their break-up at the Reading Festival on 28 August 1983, which was eventually released in 1992 as their BBC Radio One Live in Concert album. The last concert came in Nuremberg on 4 September, at the Monsters of Rock festival, after which the band members went their separate ways.

=== Post-Thin Lizzy projects, Lynott's death, and tributes (1985–1996) ===
Before the end of 1983, Lynott formed a new band called Grand Slam, but they were never able to secure a contract with a record company and split by the beginning of 1985. Sykes and Downey initially agreed to be a part of the band, but Sykes joined Whitesnake and Downey also changed his mind. Lynott began to focus more on his solo career and enjoyed a No. 5 hit single "Out in the Fields" with Gary Moore in May 1985. The song was composed by Moore and was taken from his solo album Run for Cover, which featured various contributions from Lynott. Lynott's solo efforts did not fare so well, and his last single, "Nineteen", only reached No. 76 in the UK.

Before his death, Lynott was planning a third solo album, and had spoken to Downey about a possible reformation of Thin Lizzy around March 1986, possibly with Gorham and Sykes, and had booked studio time for January of that year. "Phil asked Brian Downey and I to re-form Thin Lizzy and we both agreed," recalled guitarist Robin George, on whose album Dangerous Music Lynott had played. "We made some recordings in the studio in his back garden in the house at Kew during December [1985]. It went absolutely great… Unfortunately, the cassette of our material failed to resurface after his death. It was the only copy. It was such a shame as Phil was vibed up about the new Lizzy." Lynott died in hospital in Salisbury, Wiltshire, on 4 January 1986, aged 36, having suffered from internal abscesses, pneumonia and septicaemia, brought on by his drug dependency, which led to multiple organ failure.

On 17 May, Thin Lizzy reformed for the Self Aid concert, with a line-up of Gary Moore, Downey, Gorham, Wharton and Bob Daisley on bass. Bob Geldof and Moore handled most lead vocals, though various singers got onstage for "Whiskey in the Jar". A compilation album, Soldier of Fortune, was released in 1987, and also that year, the "Vibe for Philo" tribute concert in Lynott's memory was organised by Dublin DJ and promoter Smiley Bolger, which continues on an annual basis on the anniversary of Lynott's death.

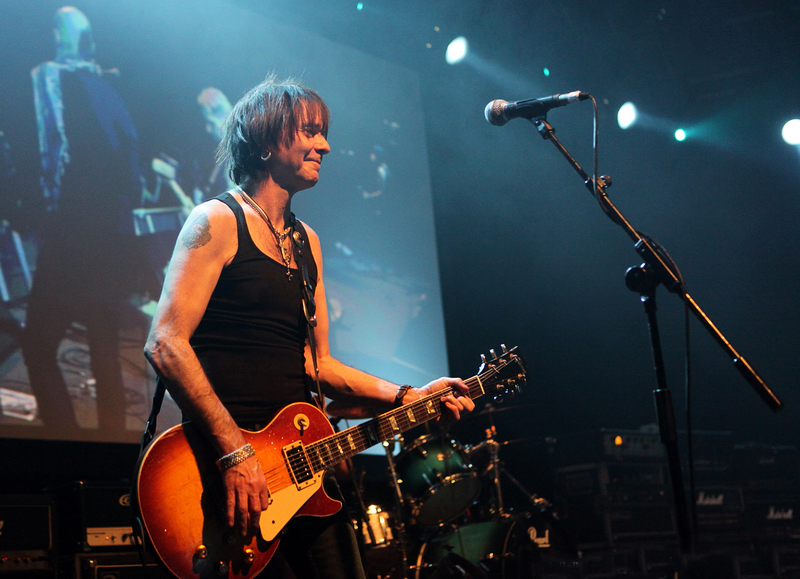
Brian Robertson performing at the 25th annual "Vibe for Philo", 4 January 2011

The remaining members of Thin Lizzy did not work together until the recording of the single "Dedication" in October 1990, when a rough demo of Lynott's called "Guiding Light" was worked into a finished song to commemorate the fifth anniversary of his death. The song dated from the Grand Slam days and had been originally written with guitarist Laurence Archer. Modern recording techniques were used to replace the guitar and drum tracks with new work by Downey and Gorham. Gary Moore had agreed to participate as well, but ultimately did not do so. The song charted in the UK at No. 35 during early 1991, and No. 2 in Ireland, and featured on another greatest hits compilation album, Dedication: The Very Best of Thin Lizzy, released in February of that year, which reached No. 8 in the UK album chart. However, a follow-up reissue of "The Boys Are Back in Town" only reached No. 63 in the UK, although it peaked at No. 16 in Ireland.

Following this, numerous small reunion projects began to appear. In 1991, a line-up featuring Robertson and Downey performed with Bobby Tench on lead vocals, ex-Grand Slam member Doish Nagle on guitar and Doug Brockie on bass. They toured Ireland briefly with a series of "An Evening of Thin Lizzy" concerts. In August 1994, Downey, Bell, Robertson and Wharton held a tribute concert in Wolverhampton, together with tribute bands Limehouse Lizzy, Ain't Lizzy and Bad Habitz. Another version of Thin Lizzy was formed later that year by John Sykes (now also performing lead vocals) with Downey, Gorham and Wharton, and with bass parts played by Marco Mendoza, who had played with Sykes in Blue Murder from 1991 to 1993. The tour was advertised as a tribute to Phil Lynott. This line-up also played at the Vibe for Philo gig on 4 January 1996, with a number of other notable musicians including Eric Bell, Midge Ure, Brush Shiels, Henry Rollins, and Joe Elliott and Rick Savage from Def Leppard. Boxer Steve Collins also performed, reciting the lyrics to "Warriors". Brian Robertson was absent due to injury.

In 1994, a collection of Thin Lizzy tracks from the BBC Radio 1 Peel Sessions was released, and yet another compilation album was brought out in 1996, called Wild One: The Very Best Of Thin Lizzy. This was successful, although it did not feature the title track, "Wild One". On 20 August 1996, Rude Awakening bassist Robert Ryder held "A Celebration of the Life of Philip Lynott" at the Palace in Hollywood, California, at the request of Lynott's mother, Philomena, to commemorate both Phil Lynott's birthday and the tenth year of his death. Philomena Lynott, her partner Dennis Keeley, and Smiley Bolger (Ireland's Vibe for Philo promoter) were flown to Los Angeles by Ryder to make a personal appearance at the show. It featured concert performances by Rude Awakening, Billy Sheehan, Rudy Sarzo, John Norum, Carmine Appice, Phantom Blue, Bang Tango and producer Roy Z and his band the Tribe of Gypsies.

=== John Sykes era (1996–2010) ===
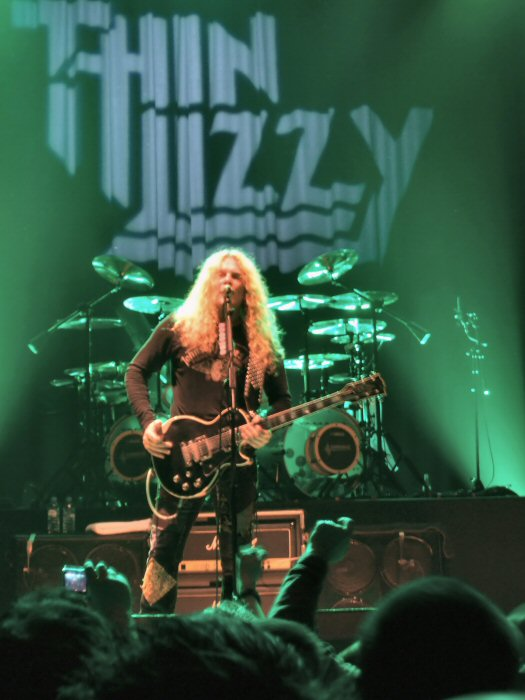
John Sykes fronting the reformed version of Thin Lizzy in December 2007

In 1996 John Sykes decided to reactivate Thin Lizzy, presenting the band as a tribute to Phil Lynott's life and work. He decided to take on the role of lead vocals himself in the absence of Lynott, and persuaded Scott Gorham, Brian Downey and Darren Wharton to return to the fold. To complete the line-up, Marco Mendoza continued in Lynott's role as bass player. They received criticism for using the Thin Lizzy name without Lynott being present, but the band only played hits from Thin Lizzy's back catalogue, and did not compose any new material.

In 1997, Tommy Aldridge filled in on drums when Brian Downey was unable to, and became a full member when Downey left shortly thereafter. This line-up remained stable through to 2000, when the group recorded a live album, One Night Only. The band went on to tour the US playing clubs in early 2001, but Wharton had already left the band by the time of the tour. From 2000 to 2003, Mendoza toured with Ted Nugent, and with Whitesnake in 2004. Sykes released two solo albums during 2002–03, while Gorham worked with his band 21 Guns. Thin Lizzy performed sporadically during this period, recruiting some musicians for single tours, such as bass guitarist Guy Pratt for the Global Chaos Tour of 2003.

Wharton later stated that Thin Lizzy would have been better suited to playing fewer concerts, in bigger venues. He also felt that after the experience of fronting his own band Dare, it was not satisfying enough to play keyboards behind Gorham and Sykes. Sykes said that all the previous Thin Lizzy members were welcome to play with Thin Lizzy at any time.

In 2004, Thin Lizzy worked together again, with Sykes and Gorham bringing in ex-Angel bassist Randy Gregg, and drummer Michael Lee, who had played with Robert Plant and The Cult among others. They toured in North America in both the winter and then the summer as special guests of Deep Purple. This line-up proved temporary however, with Mendoza returning in 2005, and Aldridge returning in 2007. There were no plans for a new album though Thin Lizzy continued to tour. At the London Hammersmith Apollo concert of 13 December 2007, the line-up was Sykes, Gorham, Aldridge and Francesco DiCosmo on bass.

Sykes stated that Thin Lizzy was now "more of a tribute thing" and that it would be wrong to record new material under that name. He added that while the existing band members might record together, it would not be as Thin Lizzy. In 2007, Gorham said that Lynott still received the biggest cheer of the night at concerts, and that the current Thin Lizzy was not active simply for money. "We'd stop if we thought we were just going through the motions... I think that has a lot to do with the songs – if they were inferior, then maybe we would have got tired of it all. But they're not and we haven't," he said. In January 2011, Gorham maintained that Lynott would have approved of the continuation of the band: "He worked long hours and travelled thousands of miles to get it to a certain level. There's no way he would have said 'No-one should play those songs again.'"

Thin Lizzy, along with support band The Answer, were to support AC/DC at stadium shows in England, Ireland and Scotland at the end of June 2009, but these appearances were cancelled after drummer Aldridge broke his collarbone in an accident. On 30 June, the band's website confirmed that Sykes had left Thin Lizzy and all shows for the rest of 2009 were cancelled or postponed. Gorham stated that he would announce Thin Lizzy's future plans shortly. In a statement, he said, "It's been a very tough time of late for myself and the band, firstly with drummer Tommy Aldridge's injury and now the subsequent decision for John and the rest of the group to go their separate ways. I can only apologise to everyone who has supported us over the years, but we will be back up to full speed soon." Sykes died from cancer in December 2024 at the age of 65.

=== Ricky Warwick era and Black Star Riders (2010–2019) ===
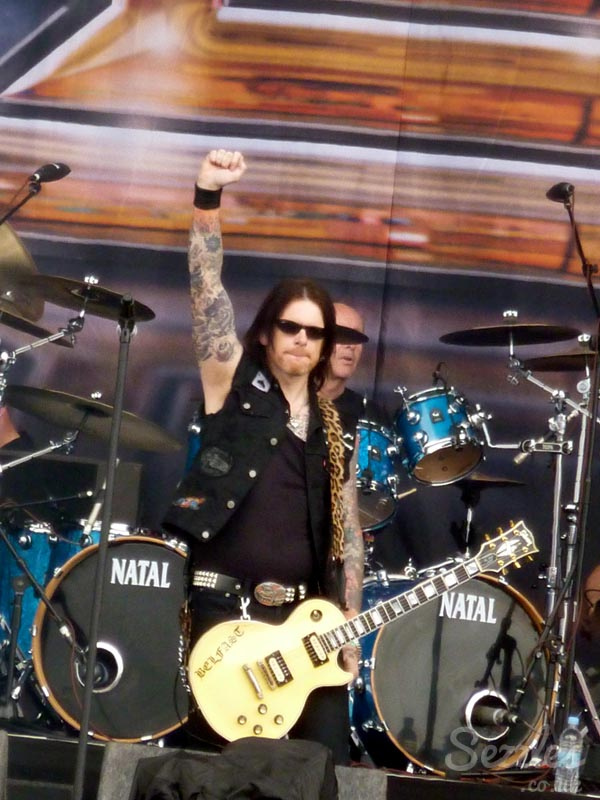
Ricky Warwick fronting Thin Lizzy at Download Festival, June 2011

In September 2009, Gorham began to assemble a new version of Thin Lizzy, and in May 2010 a new line-up was announced. Joining Gorham was original drummer Brian Downey, long-standing keyboardist Darren Wharton, Def Leppard guitarist Vivian Campbell, and singer Ricky Warwick from The Almighty, while Marco Mendoza returned to fill the bass guitar role. Ex-Lizzy guitarist Brian Robertson was asked if he wanted to participate but had previous commitments to his own solo career. In addition to a full UK and European tour beginning in January 2011, the band initially announced a concert for 4 January at the O2 Arena in Dublin, which was in conflict with the 2011 "Vibe for Philo". The tour itself started on 6 January at the Music Hall in Aberdeen, Scotland, with the band finishing the tour in The Olympia, Dublin on 17 February 2011, having cancelled the O2 show.

In April 2011 the band announced that Vivian Campbell would be leaving Thin Lizzy amicably to rejoin Def Leppard after one final gig on 28 May. He was replaced by Guns N' Roses guitarist Richard Fortus. On 28 August, it was announced that Damon Johnson of Alice Cooper's band would be replacing Fortus for Thin Lizzy's tour of the US with Judas Priest. Fortus returned to tour with Guns N' Roses for the rest of the year, and Johnson has since replaced Fortus permanently.

In March 2011, Gorham told Billboard.com that Thin Lizzy may record a new album in the future, saying, "That's the No. 1 question we're getting from people – are we gonna record some new material? The fans seem to trust this line-up, and I don't blame them. We've kind of jumped this emotional hurdle together. Ricky's writing some fucking killer lyrics, and with the kind of talent that's in Thin Lizzy now I think we can pull off a really cool set of tunes. At least it's something that we can think about now, where before it wasn't on the table."

On 25 June 2012, Thin Lizzy were in the studio recording new material, although it was not clear how many songs would be recorded or released. On 10 October 2012, Thin Lizzy announced that the new material would not be released under the Thin Lizzy name, but would be released under a different name in due course. According to Gorham, this was "out of respect to Phil Lynott and the legacy he created", though he confirmed that the new material would feature the classic Thin Lizzy sound. Ricky Warwick announced that the group would cease regular touring as Thin Lizzy at the end of 2012, but that this did not necessarily mean they would never play as Thin Lizzy again.

On 20 December 2012, Gorham revealed that the new material would be recorded under the name of Black Star Riders, and that Downey and Wharton had chosen not to participate in the new band project. Downey had decided to take a break from touring, and Wharton would be working on his own band Dare, and a film project. In March 2013, the band toured Australia under the Thin Lizzy name, with Downey and Wharton, as the opening act on a triple bill with Mötley Crüe and Kiss. Gorham stressed that Thin Lizzy would still perform together occasionally: "We'll still go out as Thin Lizzy. There are still certain big festivals that we will do. Thin Lizzy is still on the horizon, we will still go out and do that but in the meantime we have Black Star Riders that we are going to concentrate on also."

On 19 January 2016, the band revealed a "half dozen or so" dates in mid-2016 and early 2017 to commemorate the 40th anniversary of the release of Jailbreak and the 30th anniversary of Lynott's death. Two festival dates were initially confirmed: the Ramblin' Man Fair in Maidstone, Kent on 23 July 2016 – at which Midge Ure once again joined them on stage – and the Rock Legends Cruise in Fort Lauderdale, Florida, on 19–23 January 2017. The lineup for these shows was to be Gorham, Warwick, Johnson and Wharton with Motörhead drummer Mikkey Dee initially confirmed as standing in for Downey. Further dates were announced soon afterwards, at the Monsters of Rock shows in Germany on 17 and 18 June 2016, in Barcelona on 17 July, and the Skogsröjet Festival in Sweden on 6 August. On 19 April it was announced that Dee would not be participating after all, and that Judas Priest drummer Scott Travis would be taking Downey's place for all shows except Sweden on 6 August, when Europe drummer Ian Haugland played. Also, Aerosmith bass guitarist Tom Hamilton was confirmed as Thin Lizzy's bassist for these shows.

After the shows were completed, Gorham confirmed that extended Thin Lizzy tours were probably a thing of the past, but that the band would continue to perform in one-off events. He stated, "To kill it off stone dead I think would be the wrong thing." Four further shows were announced for 2019 in the UK, Spain and Belgium. Troy Sanders of Mastodon was recruited to replace Hamilton on bass guitar for these shows.

In September 2021, Gorham left Black Star Riders as the band were planning a "very heavy" touring schedule to promote their upcoming fifth album. Warwick stated, "He will be looking to put Thin Lizzy back out on the road from 2022 onwards with a busy schedule." Gorham made a statement complimenting the band and thanking the fans, and confirmed Warwick's position in Thin Lizzy, adding, "Regarding Thin Lizzy concerts in 2022 – this is currently in the planning stages and I will make sure to let you know of our progress regarding line-ups and dates." In late 2022, Gorham temporarily rejoined Black Star Riders' touring lineup and took part in a tenth anniversary tour of the UK in February 2023. Shortly before the tour began, Warwick spoke of Gorham's intentions for Thin Lizzy: "I know he's working on some stuff for later in the year, so I'm sure when it's all put in place I'll get a call."

Scott Gorham indicated in an interview with Classic Rock in July 2026 that he was not intending to do any further shows with Thin Lizzy, and that his touring version of the band had come to an end.

== Other Thin Lizzy releases and tributes ==
A boxed set of four CDs of Thin Lizzy material was released in December 2001 as Vagabonds, Kings, Warriors, Angels. It contained all of the band's major hits, and included some rare songs, such as the first single "The Farmer", and single B-sides. In 2004 and 2006, two further greatest hits compilations were released, with 2004's double CD Greatest Hits climbing to No. 3 in the UK album chart.

On 19 August 2005, Gary Moore staged a concert at the Point Theatre, Dublin, promoted as "The Boy Is Back in Town". The concert was staged to mark the unveiling of a bronze statue of Lynott on Dublin's Harry Street in the city centre. The performance also featured Brian Downey, Eric Bell, Brian Robertson and Scott Gorham, and included many classic Lizzy songs, such as "Whiskey in the Jar", "Still in Love With You", "Cowboy Song", "Emerald" and "The Boys Are Back in Town". A DVD of the concert was released as One Night in Dublin: A Tribute to Phil Lynott.

On 8 September 2008, a 15-track album UK Tour '75 was released featuring the band performing at Derby College on 21 November 1975. The album includes a 20-page booklet of previously-unseen photos, liner notes written by Brian Downey, and extra material of the band jamming during their soundcheck.

In March 2009, VH1 Classic Records issued the band-authorised Still Dangerous: Live At The Tower Theatre Philadelphia, 1977, a live CD recorded on the Bad Reputation tour. It was produced by Gorham and Glyn Johns, and Johns also mixed the record. It reached no. 98 in the UK chart. Gorham suggested there would be further archival releases in the future.

On 24 January 2011, Universal Music issued remastered and expanded editions of Jailbreak, Johnny the Fox and Live and Dangerous. Jailbreak and Johnny the Fox are double CD editions with the second disc containing outtakes, BBC session recordings and newly remixed versions of select album tracks. Live and Dangerous was a three-disc set, consisting of two CDs and a DVD. The former contains the original album plus two bonus tracks, recorded on the same tour and originally released on the Killers Live EP in 1981, while the DVD features a 1978 live performance from the Rainbow Theatre, recorded for television but never broadcast. Previous CD editions of Live and Dangerous were single discs. Universal followed that with remasters of Bad Reputation, Black Rose and Chinatown, and in early 2012, Nightlife and Fighting. Finally, Renegade and Thunder and Lightning were remastered and re-released in 2013.

On 27 September 2024, a six-disc box set including a Blu-ray disc was released featuring expanded versions of Jailbreak and Johnny the Fox. Titled 1976, the set includes original and remixed versions of both albums, two discs of outtakes and radio sessions, plus a live show recorded at The Agora in Cleveland on 5 November 1976. The Blu-ray disc also features the original and remixed albums. 1976 charted at number 58 on the Official UK Album Chart Update.

On 24 January 2025, an album of Eric Bell-era songs is to be released on the Decca label, featuring Lynott's original vocals, Downey's drums, and new acoustic guitar parts by Bell. Acoustic Sessions contains ten songs including "Slow Blues G.M.", a tribute to Gary Moore. A single, "Whiskey in the Jar", was previewed on Planet Rock Radio.

== Style and legacy ==
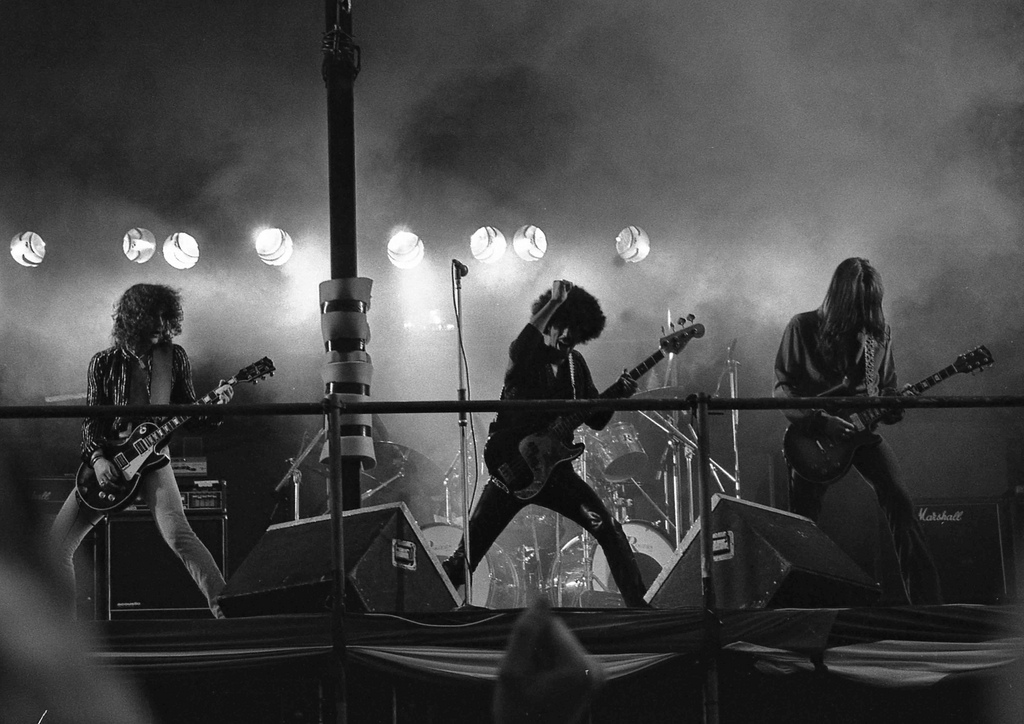
L–R: Brian Robertson (guitar), Phil Lynott (bass guitar), and Scott Gorham (guitar), 1978

As a lyricist, Lynott drew from his personal experiences growing up in Dublin and from Celtic literature. His songs featured a variety of themes and characters, from working-class stories to tales from Celtic culture. Lynott's style of singing also set him apart from other hard rock musicians of the day, utilizing a seemingly casual sense of off-the-beat phrasing "closer to folk or jazz."

From 1974, Thin Lizzy switched from using one lead guitarist to two. This twin lead guitar style was later refined and popularised in the mid-1970s by bands like Judas Priest, and later by the emerging new wave of British heavy metal groups such as Iron Maiden and Def Leppard. Iron Maiden covered the song "Massacre" from Thin Lizzy's Johnny the Fox album, and released it on their 1988 single "Can I Play with Madness". A cover of "Cowboy Song" appears on Sound of White Noise (1993) by Anthrax as a bonus track on the album's Japanese and Australian releases, and as a B-side on some singles of "Only" and "Black Lodge".

Thin Lizzy are also a major inspiration for modern heavy metal bands such as Metallica, Alice in Chains, Mastodon and Testament. Metallica have covered "Whiskey in the Jar" multiple times in honour of their former bassist Cliff Burton, who died in a bus accident in 1986. Thin Lizzy were one of Burton's favourite bands, and Lynott had a major influence on him as a bass player. In 2004, Robert Smith, lead singer of The Cure, commented that he had seen Thin Lizzy "probably 10 times over two years", and that "the actual sound of them live was so empowering, it was better than drinking." Alternative rock group The Hold Steady have also cited Thin Lizzy as an influence. Thin Lizzy are referred to in Belle and Sebastian's 2003 song "I'm a Cuckoo", and Uncle Tupelo's 1993 song "Fifteen Keys".

Guns N' Roses cited the band as an influence. Lead singer Axl Rose was a fan of the band, and the tattoo that inspired the skull cross cover of Appetite for Destruction was a reference to Thin Lizzy.

== Members ==
Most recent lineup

- Scott Gorham – guitars, backing vocals (1974–1983, 1996–2019)
- Darren Wharton – keyboards, co-lead and backing vocals (1981–1983, 1996–2000, 2010–2019)
- Ricky Warwick – lead vocals, occasional guitars (2010–2019)
- Damon Johnson – guitars, backing vocals (2011–2019)
- Scott Travis – drums, percussion (2016–2019)
- Troy Sanders – bass guitar, backing vocals (2019)

== Discography ==
- Thin Lizzy (1971)
- Shades of a Blue Orphanage (1972)
- Vagabonds of the Western World (1973)
- Nightlife (1974)
- Fighting (1975)
- Jailbreak (1976)
- Johnny the Fox (1976)
- Bad Reputation (1977)
- Black Rose: A Rock Legend (1979)
- Chinatown (1980)
- Renegade (1981)
- Thunder and Lightning (1983)
