= Life (Thin Lizzy album) =

Live album by Thin Lizzy
- Released: October 1983
- Recorded: 27 November 1981; 10–12 March 1983
- Venue: Hammersmith Odeon, London, UK; The Leisureland, Galway, Ireland
- Genre: Hard rock, blues rock
- Length: 97:45
- Label: Vertigo; Warner Bros. (US only)
- Producer: Phil Lynott, Thin Lizzy

Thin Lizzy live albums chronology
Live and Dangerous (1978)	Life (1983)	BBC Radio One Live in Concert (1992)

Professional ratings
Review scores
Source	Rating
AllMusic	3/5 stars
Collector's Guide to Heavy Metal	7/10

Life (subtitled Live, and labelled Life:Live on the original vinyl LP editions) is a double live album by Irish rock band Thin Lizzy, released in 1983. This double album was recorded during their farewell tour in 1983, principally at the Hammersmith Odeon in London, UK. Phil Lynott had felt reluctantly that it was time to disband the group after the 1983 tour and to mark the occasion, former Thin Lizzy guitarists Eric Bell (1969–73), Brian Robertson (1974–76 and 1977-78) and Gary Moore (1974, 1977 and 1978–79) joined the band on stage at the end of these gigs to do some numbers. This was called "The All-Star Jam".

The versions of "Renegade", "Hollywood" and "Killer on the Loose" featuring Snowy White had been performed two years earlier when he was still with the band. White's participation was only credited to "Renegade".

Lynott described the slower tempo version of "Don't Believe a Word" as being the original arrangement. A version of the song with the slower arrangement appears on Moore's Back on the Streets album from 1978, with Lynott on bass guitar and lead vocals and Brian Downey on drums.

During the performance of "The Rocker", all of the guitarists (except for White) played at the same time (Moore, John Sykes, Scott Gorham, Robertson and Bell), making a total of eight members on stage performing at once (including keyboard player Darren Wharton).

== Track listing ==
(CD issues combine sides 1 and 2 on CD1 and sides 3 and 4 on CD 2)

Side one
No.	Title	Writer(s)	Original album	Length
1.	"Thunder and Lightning"	Brian Downey, Phil Lynott	Thunder and Lightning (1983)	5:10
2.	"Waiting for an Alibi"	Lynott	Black Rose: A Rock Legend (1979)	3:20
3.	"Jailbreak"	Lynott	Jailbreak (1976)	4:05
4.	"Baby Please Don't Go"	Lynott	Thunder and Lightning (1983)	5:00
5.	"The Holy War"	Lynott	Thunder and Lightning (1983)	5:57

Side two
No.	Title	Writer(s)	Original album	Length
6.	"Renegade"	Lynott, Snowy White	Renegade (1981)	6:25
7.	"Hollywood (Down on Your Luck)"	Scott Gorham, Lynott	Renegade (1981)	4:02
8.	"Got to Give It Up"	Lynott, Gorham	Black Rose: A Rock Legend (1979)	6:55
9.	"Angel of Death"	Lynott, Darren Wharton	Renegade (1981)	6:06
10.	"Are You Ready"	Downey, Gorham, Lynott, Brian Robertson		2:56

Side three
No.	Title	Writer(s)	Original album	Length
1.	"The Boys Are Back in Town"	Lynott	Jailbreak (1976)	4:48
2.	"Cold Sweat"	Lynott, John Sykes	Thunder and Lightning (1983)	3:10
3.	"Don't Believe a Word"	Lynott	Johnny the Fox (1976)	5:10
4.	"Killer on the Loose"	Lynott	Chinatown (1980)	6:19
5.	"The Sun Goes Down"	Lynott, Wharton	Thunder and Lightning (1983)	5:02

Side four
No.	Title	Writer(s)	Original album	Length
6.	"Emerald"	Downey, Gorham, Lynott, Robertson	Jailbreak (1976)	3:50
7.	"Black Rose"	Lynott, Gary Moore	Black Rose: A Rock Legend (1979)	6:50
8.	"Still in Love With You"	Lynott	Nightlife (1974)	8:50
9.	"The Rocker"	Eric Bell, Downey, Lynott	Vagabonds of the Western World (1973)	4:50

== Personnel ==
- Phil Lynott – bass guitar, lead vocals
- Scott Gorham – guitars, backing vocals
- John Sykes – guitars, backing vocals except "Renegade", "Hollywood", "Killer on the Loose", "Emerald" and "Black Rose"
- Darren Wharton – keyboards, backing vocals
- Brian Downey – drums, percussion
- Snowy White - guitars, backing vocals ("Renegade", "Hollywood" and "Killer on the Loose")
- Gary Moore – guitars (“Black Rose” and “The Rocker”)
- Brian Robertson – guitars (“Emerald” and “The Rocker”)
- Eric Bell – guitars (“The Rocker”)

== Charts ==
Chart (1983–84)	Peak position
Swedish Albums (Sverigetopplistan)	29
UK Albums (OCC)	29
US Billboard 200	185

Chart (2023)	Peak position
Scottish Albums (OCC)	29
