= The Farmer (song) =

Single by Thin Lizzy
- B-side: "I Need You"
- Released: 31 July 1970
- Recorded: July 1970
- Studio: Trend Studios, Baggot Street, Dublin
- Length: 3:29
- Label: Parlophone
- Songwriter: Phil Lynott
- Producer: John D'Ardis

"The Farmer" is the debut single by Irish rock band Thin Lizzy, released on Parlophone in 1970. It is the only recording by the original four-piece line-up of Phil Lynott, Eric Bell, Brian Downey and Eric Wrixon.

== Background ==
Thin Lizzy were formed at the end of 1969, and quickly gained press reputation around Dublin, as the members were already known in local bands around the city.

After playing a showcase gig at St Aidan's Hall in July 1970, Thin Lizzy were signed by EMI Ireland to record a single. The song, written by lead singer and bassist Phil Lynott, was recorded at Trend Studios, Baggot Street, and produced by John D'Ardis. The B-side was a D'Ardis composition, "I Need You", which featured a brass section.

The group were inexperienced at recording, and turned up with their live PA, as guitarist Eric Bell thought D'Ardis would record the band live with their stage equipment, rather than use studio gear.

After recording, the group were told by their management that they were short of money and needed to get rid of one member. Keyboardist Eric Wrixon did not appear to fit in with the rest of the group's long-term plans, and quietly left. Lynott and Bell subsidised the band's income by performing as a folk duo in various Dublin pubs.

== Release ==
The single was released by Parlophone on 31 July 1970. Five hundred copies of the single were pressed, but only 283 copies were sold. The remainder of the unsold records were probably melted down and recycled. The group were disappointed with the failure of the single, but it is now one of the rarest releases by Thin Lizzy. In the 21st century, copies have been sold for around £800.

== Name ==
The band's name was written as Thin Lizzie on the record label.

== Critical reception ==
Upon its release, The Impartial Reporter and Farmers' Journal called "The Farmer" a "very commercial tune, while at the same time being unlike anything heard before from an Irish group". Record Mirror reported in August 1970 that the song's limited play on RTÉ Radio was a "pity as it's one of the best local [Dublin] pop records for a long time". A few months after its release, Tom Murdiff of the Evening Herald noted that the single "never seemed to get off the ground, despite the good basic quality in the number".

== Personnel ==
- Phil Lynott - lead vocals, bass guitar
- Eric Bell - guitar
- Brian Downey - drums
- Eric Wrixon - keyboards
