= UK Tour '75 =

Live album by Thin Lizzy
- Released: 8 September 2008
- Recorded: 21 November 1975
- Venue: Derby College, Derby, UK
- Genre: Hard rock, blues rock
- Length: 78:15
- Label: MLP
- Producer: Mike Dixon

Thin Lizzy live albums chronology
One Night Only (2000)	UK Tour '75 (2008)	Still Dangerous (2009)

Professional ratings
Review scores
Source	Rating
AllMusic	4/5 stars
Record Collector	3/5 stars

UK Tour '75 is a live album by Irish rock band Thin Lizzy, recorded at Derby College in Derby, England, on 21 November 1975 as part of the tour promoting the Fighting album. Released in 2008, UK Tour '75 was authorised by the surviving band members and the content was digitally remastered under their supervision.

Some of the songs had not yet been released on Thin Lizzy studio albums, such as "Cowboy Song", dubbed "Derby Blues" on the night by lead singer Phil Lynott.

== Track listing ==
No.	Title	Writer(s)	Original album	Length
1.	"Fighting My Way Back"	Phil Lynott	Fighting (1975)	3:51
2.	"It's Only Money"	Lynott	Nightlife (1974)	3:54
3.	"Wild One"	Lynott	Fighting (1975)	4:24
4.	"For Those Who Love to Live"	Brian Downey, Lynott	Fighting (1975)	5:06
5.	"Still in Love with You"	Lynott	Nightlife (1974)	9:22
6.	"Showdown"	Lynott	Nightlife (1974)	5:32
7.	"Suicide"	Lynott	Fighting (1975)	5:07
8.	"Rosalie"	Bob Seger	Fighting (1975)	3:59
9.	"The Rocker"	Eric Bell, Downey, Lynott	Vagabonds of the Western World (1973)	3:55
10.	"Sha La La"	Downey, Lynott	Nightlife (1974)	7:09
11.	"Baby Drives Me Crazy"	Downey, Scott Gorham, Lynott, Brian Robertson		6:24
12.	"Me and the Boys"	Lynott		6:43
13.	"Cowboy Song ("Derby Blues")"	Downey, Lynott	Jailbreak (1976)	6:49
14.	"Little Darling"	Lynott	single (1974)	3:13
15.	"Sound Check Jam"	Downey, Gorham, Lynott, Robertson		2:47

== Personnel ==
Thin Lizzy

- Phil Lynott – bass guitar, lead vocals
- Scott Gorham – lead and rhythm guitar, backing vocals
- Brian Robertson – lead and rhythm guitar, backing vocals
- Brian Downey – drums, percussion

Production

- John Moon, Geoff Woodward, John Arnold - engineers
- Dave Blackman - pre-production sequencing
- Richard Evans - mastering
- Mike Dixon - MLP producer
