= Cowboy Song (Thin Lizzy song) =

Single by Thin Lizzy

from the album Jailbreak
- B-side: "Angel from the Coast"
- Released: September 1976
- Genre: Hard rock; Southern rock
- Length: 3:17 (single); 5:16 (album)
- Label: Mercury
- Songwriter(s): Phil Lynott and Brian Downey
- Producer(s): John Alcock

Thin Lizzy singles chronology
| "Jailbreak" (1976) | "Cowboy Song" (1976) | "Rocky" (1976) |

"Cowboy Song" is a song by hard rock band Thin Lizzy that originally appeared on their 1976 album Jailbreak.

Released as a single in an edited version, it reached No. 77 on the US charts, but at the time did not gain as much attention as two of their most popular songs on the same album, "The Boys Are Back in Town" and "Jailbreak". The song was written by frontman Phil Lynott and drummer Brian Downey.

Written from the perspective of a cowboy, the lyrics tell of his wandering across the United States through various adventures and romances. The song begins with a mellow acoustic, country music-style introduction before a transition to up-tempo hard rock.

"Cowboy Song" has since been described as one of Thin Lizzy's great songs because it has "one of the catchiest, most memorable twin-guitar harmony leads ever". AllMusic described the song as turning the commonplace into legend, or bringing myth into the modern world. The author of Phil Lynott: The Rocker, Mark Putterford, described the song as "a cross between Clint Eastwood and Rudolph Valentino, with a bit of George Best thrown in for good measure". Rolling Stone magazine called the song "definitive".

Over time, it has become a fan favourite and one of Thin Lizzy's signature songs. The song is now one of their most popular and referred to as a classic.

== Use in media ==
Cowboy Song was used in the 2016 film Eddie the Eagle when Hugh Jackman's character, a drunk Bronson Peary, ski jumps down a 90-metre jump. The song was also featured in the 2013 independent film The Kings of Summer when the main character (Joe Toy) first bike rides into the woods.

Released in late February 2016, the authorised biography of Phil Lynott is titled Cowboy Song.

== Cover versions ==
- Dump released a version on their 2003 studio album A Grown-Ass Man. CMJ New Music Report called the song the best track on the disc.
- Golden Smog released a version on their 1992 five-song EP On Golden Smog.
- Million Dollar Reload released a version on their 2014 live album As Real As It Gets. PlanetMosh called the song a great choice of cover and a great way to end the [live] show.
- Anthrax released a version on selected singles from their 1993 studio album Sound of White Noise, and as the bonus track for the album's Japanese and Australian releases.
- Supersuckers regularly sing a version at their live concerts. They also released a version on their 2008 album Get It Together (DVD [live] bonus disc).

== Personnel (original 1976 version) ==
- Phil Lynott – bass, vocals, acoustic guitar
- Scott Gorham – lead and rhythm guitars
- Brian Robertson – lead and rhythm guitars
- Brian Downey – drums, percussion

== Charts ==
| Chart (1976) | Peak position |
|---|---|
| US Billboard Hot 100 | 77 |

== See also ==
- Thin Lizzy discography
- List of Thin Lizzy band members
