= Waiting for an Alibi =

- UK single sleeve featuring (L–R): Downey, Lynott, Gorham and Moore

Single by Thin Lizzy

from the album Black Rose: A Rock Legend
- B-side: "With Love"
- Released: 23 February 1979
- Recorded: December 1978
- Genre: Hard rock
- Length: 3:29
- Label: Vertigo
- Songwriter: Phil Lynott
- Producers: Tony Visconti and Thin Lizzy

Thin Lizzy singles chronology
"Rosalie/Cowgirl's Song (Medley)" (1978)	"Waiting for an Alibi" (1979)	"Do Anything You Want To" (1979)

"Waiting for an Alibi" is a song by the Irish rock band Thin Lizzy and the first single from the band's 1979 album, Black Rose: A Rock Legend. Black Rose was the only Thin Lizzy album recorded while Gary Moore was a member of the band, and he left soon after.

The song was released as a single reaching No. 9 in the UK Singles Chart and No. 6 in Ireland. An accompanying video was filmed. The band promoted the single with a performance on The Kenny Everett Video Show.

An extended version of this track can be found on The Adventures of Thin Lizzy compilation LP released in 1981, Dedication: The Very Best of Thin Lizzy released on CD in 1991, as well as Wild One: The Very Best of Thin Lizzy, released in 1996. It also appears on the compilation albums Lizzy Killers (1981) and Soldier of Fortune (1987). This version lasts 4:08 and has a third verse and chorus not included on the single.

== History ==
Before its release, the track had been reworked from its original recording. A demo of the song was recorded in early 1978 with Brian Robertson on lead guitar alongside Scott Gorham (this was before Gary Moore's return to the band). The song was also played at Thin Lizzy's major gig at Sydney Harbour in late 1978 where the version performed could be described lyrically as a cross-over between the original demo and the final version that was released the following year.

When Moore left Thin Lizzy in July 1979, Midge Ure was brought in to help finish a tour of the US, becoming the first in a string of guitarists to perform the song with the band. He was followed by Dave Flett, Snowy White and John Sykes before Thin Lizzy split up in 1983. In later incarnations of the band, Vivian Campbell, Richard Fortus and Damon Johnson also performed Moore's parts.

== Critical reception ==
Upon its release, Robin Smith of Record Mirror praised "Waiting for an Alibi" as the "ultimate single, unwinding like a sleepy cobra before a ton impact of dual guitars right between the eyes". He added that the chorus "serves as a good break between further Gary Moore onslaughts". Ian Birch of Melody Maker did not consider it to be "one of Lynott's stronger songs", but still believed it would chart. He said: "The structure is stout, if less than noteworthy, the sound clean, the musicianship astringent and Lynott's swagger as harmlessly romantic as ever, but definitely a case of could-have-done-much-better." Danny Baker of the NME noted the "belt of power this 45 possesses", but also did not believe it was one of Lynott's "greatest" efforts. He concluded: "You get the force but because of its unadventurous framework it cracks as hollow as the fabled blown egg."

== Personnel (studio version) ==
- Phil Lynott – bass guitar, lead vocals
- Scott Gorham – lead guitar
- Gary Moore – lead guitar
- Brian Downey – drums

== Charts ==
Chart (1979)	Peak position
Ireland (IRMA)	6
UK Singles (Official Charts)	9
