= John Norum discography =

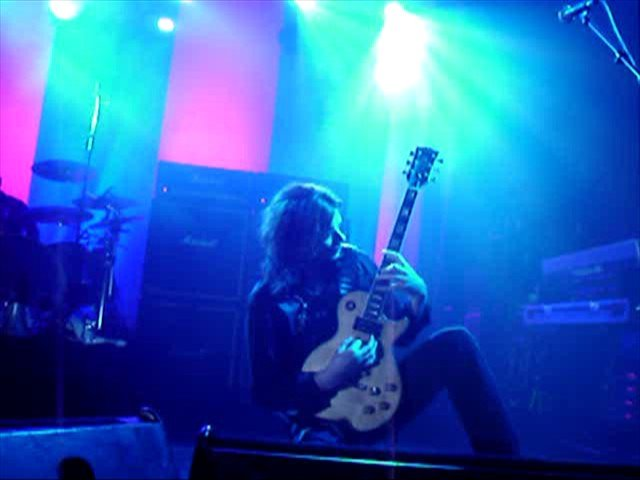
- Studio albums: 7
- Extended plays: 1
- Live albums: 1
- Singles: 8
- Music videos: 5

John Norum (born 23 February 1964) is a Norwegian-Swedish rock guitarist and one of the founders of the Swedish rock band Europe. Concurrent to his role with Europe, he also maintains a career as a solo artist.

== Studio albums ==
Year	Title	Peak chart positions
Year	Title	SWE
1987	Total Control: Release: 29 October 1987; Label: Epic Records; Formats: CD, CS, LP	4
1992	Face the Truth: Label: Epic Records; Format: CD, CS, LP	18
1995	Another Destination: Release: 23 May 1995; Label: Epic Records; Format: CD, CS, LP	44
1996	Worlds Away: Label: Shrapnel Records; Format: CD, CS, LP	—
1999	Slipped into Tomorrow: Label: Shrapnel Records; Format: CD, CS, LP	—
2005	Optimus: Label: Mascot Records; Format: CD, CS, LP	—
2010	Play Yard Blues: Release: 17 May 2010; Label: Mascot Records; Format: CD	36
2022	Gone to Stay: Release: 28 Oct 2022; Label: Gain Records; Format: CD	

== Extended plays ==
Year	Title
1990	Live in Stockholm: Label: Epic Records; Formats: CD, Cassette, LP

== Live albums ==
Year	Title
1997	Face It Live '97: Label: Shrapnel Records; Formats: CD, Cassette, LP

== Singles ==
Year	Title	Peak chart positions	Album
Year	Title	SWE	Album
1987	"Let Me Love You"	4	Total Control
1987	"Back on the Streets"	34 (us rock)	Total Control
1987	"Love Is Meant (to Last Forever)"	—	Total Control
1992	"We Will Be Strong"	32	Face the Truth
1992	"Face the Truth"	—	Face the Truth
1992	"In Your Eyes"	—	Face the Truth
1995	"Strange Days"	—	Another Destination
1996	"Where the Grass Is Green"	—	Worlds Away

== Music videos ==
Year	Title
1987	"Let Me Love You"
1987	"Back on the Streets"
1987	"Love Is Meant (to Last Forever)"
1992	"We Will Be Strong"
1995	"Strange Days"

== Collaborations ==
Year	With	Track (s)	Album
1979	Eddie Meduza	"Punkjävlar", "I'm a Fighter"	Eddie Meduza & The Roarin' Cadillacs
1983	Eddie Meduza	All tracks	Dåren É Lös! - The Roaring Cadillac's Live
1984	Eddie Meduza	"Hold Your Fire", "California"	West a Fool Away
1986	Tone Norum	All tracks	One of a Kind
1988	Tone Norum	"Love Me", "Somebody to Love"	This Time
1992	Glenn Hughes	"The Boy Can Sing the Blues", "I'm the Man"	L.A. Blues Authority Volume II: Glenn Hughes - Blues
1995	Joey Tempest	"Right to Respect"	A Place to Call Home
2024	Michael Schenker	"My Years with UFO"	Lights Out
