= Bad Reputation (Thin Lizzy album) =

Studio album by Thin Lizzy
- Released: 2 September 1977
- Recorded: May–June 1977
- Studios: Toronto Sound and Sounds Interchange, Toronto, Ontario, Canada
- Genres: Hard rock; blues rock
- Length: 35:50
- Label: Vertigo
- Producers: Thin Lizzy, Tony Visconti

Thin Lizzy chronology
Johnny the Fox (1976)	Bad Reputation (1977)	Black Rose: A Rock Legend (1979)

Singles from Bad Reputation
- 1. "Dancing in the Moonlight" Released: 29 July 1977

Bad Reputation is the eighth studio album by the Irish rock band Thin Lizzy, released in 1977. As the front cover suggests, most of the tracks feature only three-quarters of the band, with guitarist Brian Robertson only credited on three tracks. He had missed most of their previous tour, following a hand injury sustained in a brawl, and this album turned out to be his last studio effort with Thin Lizzy. On 27 June 2011, a new remastered and expanded version of Bad Reputation was released.

== Recording ==
With Robertson out of the band, band leader Phil Lynott had decided that Scott Gorham would be able to handle all the guitar duties himself, and that no replacement for Robertson would be recruited prior to recording the album. However, Gorham believed that a second guitarist was required, particularly for live work, performing songs that were written for two guitars. He later said, "I was always a big believer in the magic circle – once you broke the magic circle, the whole thing was broken, right?" He deliberately left two songs ("Opium Trail" and "Killer Without a Cause") without guitar solos recorded, and persuaded Lynott to allow Robertson to return to the band to record the solos for them. Lynott relented, and Robertson flew to Toronto and recorded his lead guitar parts. However, he initially refused to socialise with the other band members: "Christ, I wouldn't even have a drink with them," he said. He later added, "I tried not to go out to clubs for about a week, then succumbed..." Robertson and Gorham shared lead guitar parts on only one song, "That Woman's Gonna Break Your Heart".

"It was such an important album to us because of all the adversities that we'd been going through," recalled Gorham. "We had to pull this together or we were going to go down in a ball of flames."

Robertson stayed on for the subsequent Bad Reputation tour, which provided some tracks for the Live and Dangerous album (released 1978), but he left the band when the tour concluded.

== Cover art ==
Thin Lizzy's usual cover artist, Jim Fitzpatrick, did not contribute to the cover of Bad Reputation, after a misunderstanding between himself and Lynott. With the deadline for the submission of the cover drawing near, Lynott travelled to the US to meet Fitzpatrick at his home in Madison, Connecticut, but went to Madison, Wisconsin by mistake. Unable to meet with Fitzpatrick in time, Lynott agreed to use an image by Sutton Cooper which featured the band as a trio, without Robertson. A photo of the band including Robertson was used on the reverse. The interior artwork featured photos of all four members, plus photos from The Incredible Case of the Stack O'Wheat Murders by Les Krims, which Lynott had seen in New York. The album also featured the playing card suit motifs that previously featured on the Fighting album in 1975, with the spade (Lynott), club (Downey), heart (Gorham) and diamond (Robertson).

Lynott insisted that Robertson would not appear on the front cover, with which Robertson "agreed entirely", although he did appear in a group photograph on the back cover. Robertson later said, "This was another of my little moods. I didn't want my picture on the album cover because I hadn't done any of the backing tracks, and I was even in a bad mood shooting for the back of it."

== Reception ==
Professional ratings
Review scores
Source	Rating
AllMusic	4.5/5 stars
Collector's Guide to Heavy Metal	10/10

Hailing Bad Reputation as an improvement on the previous album, Johnny the Fox, Stephen Thomas Erlewine of AllMusic described the album as "leaner and tougher" than its predecessor, partly due to the influence of producer Tony Visconti. He claimed that Robertson's absence was not noticeable due to Scott Gorham's "double duty", and that this was "pure visceral rock & roll, the hardest and heaviest that Thin Lizzy ever made". He considered Bad Reputation as a rival to Jailbreak as the band's best studio album. Martin Popoff considered the album "a third stroke of genius in two short years", thematically resembling Fighting "but more confessional, reflecting and spiritual."

Released during the rise of punk rock music, and despite Thin Lizzy being a hard rock band, Bad Reputation saw the band appealing to many punks due to the band's "tuneful and musical approach" and with the "energy delivered both live and in the studio", ensuring a "youthful zest". As such, the album has been described as the band "finding fresh fields to cultivate, not only musically but also in terms of their audience".

Bad Reputation reached No. 4 in the UK Albums Chart. The single "Dancing in the Moonlight (It's Caught Me in Its Spotlight)" reached No. 14 in the UK Singles Chart in September 1977. The track should not be confused with a similarly titled song, "Dancing in the Moonlight", recorded by King Harvest and Toploader, amongst others.

== Cover versions and other uses ==
Although it was not released as a single, the title track became a live staple. American all-girl heavy metal band Phantom Blue covered "Bad Reputation" on their 1993 sophomore album Built to Perform. A cover version of the song is a playable track in the 2006 music video game Guitar Hero II, and the Thin Lizzy version was featured in the soundtrack of the 2001 documentary movie Dogtown and Z-Boys. 24-7 Spyz also covered the song on their album Face the Day (2006). Foo Fighters covered "Bad Reputation" and released it on their covers album, Medium Rare (2011). In 2012 video game Sleeping Dogs "Bad Reputation" was featured on the in-game radio station Sagittarius FM. In 2015 English speed metal band Raven covered "Bad Reputation" on their album of covers titled Party Killers. This album was only made available to backers of Raven's kickstarter for their album ExtermiNation, released in April 2015.

The Smashing Pumpkins covered "Dancing in the Moonlight (It's Caught Me in Its Spotlight)" for various live performances, turning the upbeat, overlaid melody of the original into a slowly paced acoustic tune; it was recorded as B-side of the single "Disarm". British indie pop singer-songwriter Diana Vickers covered the song as the first of several covers used as teasers leading up to the release of her second studio album. In 2005, the Thin Lizzy version of "Dancin' in the Moonlight" was used as part of an advertising campaign to launch Magners Irish Cider in the UK. In 2012 the English indie rock band Alt-J released a cover of "Dancing in the Moonlight" for the compilation The Saturday Sessions from The Dermot O'Leary Show .

Swedish guitarist John Norum of the Swedish rock band Europe covered "Opium Trail" on his second solo album, Face the Truth (1992).

== Track listings ==
Side one
No.	Title	Writer(s)	Length
1.	"Soldier of Fortune"	Phil Lynott	5:18
2.	"Bad Reputation"	Brian Downey, Scott Gorham, Lynott	3:09
3.	"Opium Trail"	Downey, Gorham, Lynott	3:58
4.	"Southbound"	Lynott	4:27

Side two
No.	Title	Writer(s)	Length
5.	"Dancing in the Moonlight (It's Caught Me in Its Spotlight)"	Lynott	3:26
6.	"Killer Without a Cause"	Gorham, Lynott	3:33
7.	"Downtown Sundown"	Lynott	4:08
8.	"That Woman's Gonna Break Your Heart"	Lynott	3:25
9.	"Dear Lord"	Gorham, Lynott	4:26

2011 remastered edition bonus tracks
No.	Title	Writer(s)	Length
10.	"Killer Without a Cause" (BBC Session 1 August 1977)		3:42
11.	"Bad Reputation" (BBC Session 1 August 1977)		2:49
12.	"That Woman's Gonna Break Your Heart" (BBC Session 1 August 1977)		3:28
13.	"Dancing in the Moonlight (It's Caught Me in Its Spotlight)" (BBC Session 1 August 1977)		3:22
14.	"Downtown Sundown" (BBC Session 1 August 1977)		3:53
15.	"Me and the Boys" (soundcheck - Universal monitor mixes)	Downey, Gorham, Lynott, Brian Robertson	4:17
Total length:			57:21

== Singles ==
- Dancing In The Moonlight/Bad Reputation – 7" (1977)

== Personnel ==
Thin Lizzy

- Phil Lynott – bass guitar, vocals, string synthesizer, Celtic harp
- Scott Gorham – lead and rhythm guitar
- Brian Downey – drums, percussion
- Brian Robertson – lead guitar on tracks 3, 6 and 8, voice box, keyboards

Additional musicians

- Jon Bojic, Ken Morris, Mary Hopkin-Visconti – backing vocals on "Dear Lord"
- John Helliwell – saxophone, clarinet

Production

- Tony Visconti – producer, engineer
- Jon Bojic, Ken Morris, Ed Stone – assistant engineers

== Charts ==
Chart (1977)	Peak position
Australian Albums (Kent Music Report)	58
Canada Top Albums/CDs (RPM)	44
Norwegian Albums (VG-lista)	13
Swedish Albums (Sverigetopplistan)	9
UK Albums (Official Charts)	4
US Billboard 200	39

== Certifications ==
Region	Certification	Certified units/sales
United Kingdom (BPI)	Gold	100,000^{^}
^{^} Shipments figures based on certification alone.
