= Live and Dangerous =

Live album by Thin Lizzy

Live album by Thin Lizzy
- Released: 2 June 1978
- Recorded: 14 November 1976, London, England with Maison Rouge Mobile, 20 and 21 October 1977, Philadelphia, Pennsylvania and; 28 October 1977, Toronto, Canada with Record Plant Mobile, January 1978, Des Dames Studio, Paris, France (overdubs and mixing)
- Genres: Hard rock, blues rock
- Length: 76:27
- Labels: Vertigo; Mercury (Canada); Warner Bros. (US)
- Producers: Thin Lizzy and Tony Visconti

Thin Lizzy live albums chronology
Live and Dangerous (1978)	Life (1983)

Singles from Live and Dangerous
- 1. "Rosalie/Cowgirl's Song" / "Me and the Boys" Released: 28 April 1978

Live and Dangerous is a live double album by the Irish rock band Thin Lizzy, released in June 1978. It was recorded in London in 1976, and Philadelphia and Toronto in 1977, with further production in Paris. It was also the last Thin Lizzy album to feature guitarist Brian Robertson, (Note: The live album Life, released in 1984, features Robertson as a guest artist.) who left the band shortly after its release.

The band decided to release a live album after their producer Tony Visconti did not have enough time to work on a full studio session. They listened through various archive recordings from earlier tours and compiled the album from the best versions. Various studio overdubs were made to the live recordings during early 1978 in Paris; exactly how much of the album is overdubbed has been a contentious topic since its release. The album reached No. 2 in the UK Albums Chart, ultimately selling over half a million copies in the UK. It has continued to attract critical acclaim and it has appeared in several lists of the greatest live albums of all time.

== Recording ==
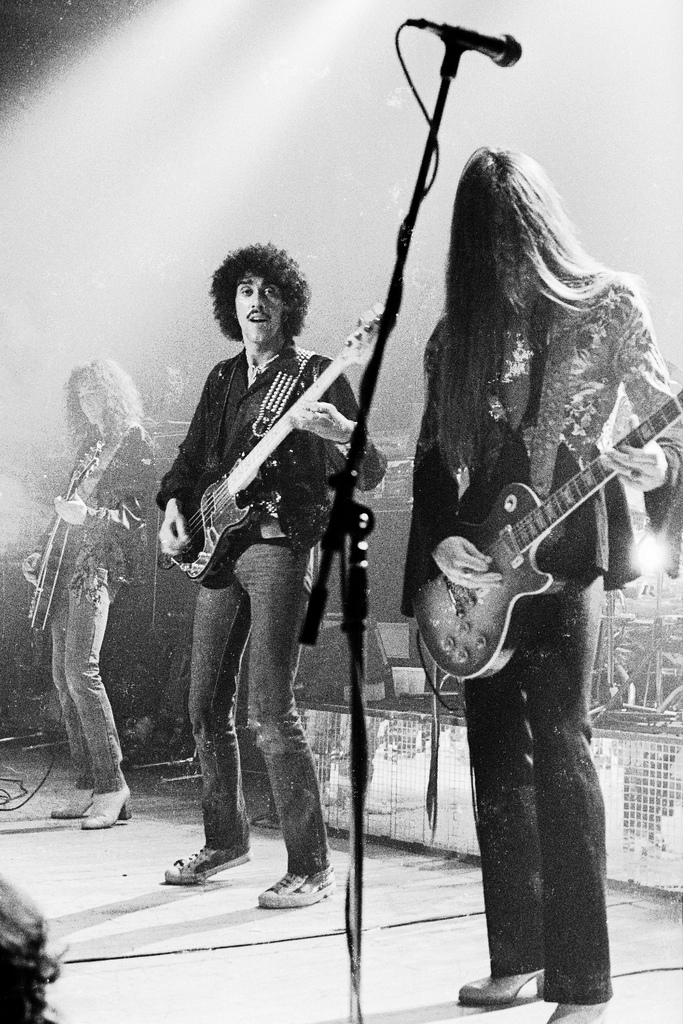
Thin Lizzy live on the Bad Reputation tour in 1977, during which concerts at Philadelphia and Toronto were recorded for the album.

By the mid-1970s, Thin Lizzy had stabilised around its founding members – singer and bassist Phil Lynott and drummer Brian Downey – and guitarists Scott Gorham and Brian Robertson. The band had scored hit singles and developed a strong live following, including headlining the Reading Festival. Robertson had briefly left the band in 1977 but subsequently returned.

The group planned to make a new studio album at the start of 1978, helmed by producer Tony Visconti, with whom they had created the successful Bad Reputation. However, Visconti had a very tight schedule and had committed to producing albums for other artists, so Lynott suggested they instead spend two weeks together compiling a live album.

The band and Visconti listened to over 30 hours of archive recordings, looking for the best performances. The album's sleeve notes credit two concerts as its source: Hammersmith Odeon, London, England on 14 November 1976 (part of the tour for Johnny the Fox, released earlier that year), and Seneca College Fieldhouse, Don Mills, Toronto, Ontario, Canada on 28 October 1977 (part of the tour for Bad Reputation).

Visconti later revealed that shows at the Tower Theater, Philadelphia on 20 and 21 October 1977, a week earlier than the Toronto gig, had also been recorded. The band had listened to the Hammersmith tapes shortly after recording and agreed that the performances sounded better than the studio versions. Thin Lizzy biographer Mark Putterford believes the majority of recordings on the finished album are from the Hammersmith show. Visconti later said the performance of "Southbound" came from a soundcheck before one of the Philadelphia gigs, with the audience reaction dubbed from another song.

On the album, the band segues immediately from "Cowboy Song" into "The Boys Are Back in Town", on the line "a cowboy's life is the life for me" – the last chord of the former was the first of the latter, although their studio versions were recorded as separate songs. This segue remained a staple of the band's setlist for the rest of their career, and examples can be found on other live releases. The band had rearranged "Still in Love with You" to be slower and more emotional than the original studio version, and the version on Live and Dangerous was considered by Putterford the highlight of Lynott's musical career. "That was us at our best," observed Gorham, "before the bad drugs came in."

To promote the album, the group filmed a gig at the Rainbow Theatre, London on 29 March 1978 for a television broadcast. However, this was cancelled and the footage went unaired.

== Production ==
"We are a very loud band ... how are you going to replace my guitar when it's so loud that it's going to bleed all over the bloody drum kit?"

— Brian Robertson countering claims that the album is mostly overdubbed

The album was mixed and overdubbed at Studio Des Dames, Paris in January 1978. All sources agree that overdubbing took place on Live and Dangerous, although there is considerable disagreement about the extent of them. According to Visconti, the album was "75% recorded in the studio" with only the drums and audience noise remaining from the original live recordings. Visconti later said the overdubs and production were essential in order that the listener could hear a professional sounding band. He claims to have created some audience sounds from a keyboard-triggered tape loop in a similar manner to a Mellotron or sampling keyboard. Nevertheless, Visconti was happy with the production and believes the end result sounds authentic.

However, manager Chris O'Donnell said the album was 75% live, with overdubs restricted to backing vocals and a few guitar solos to "clean the sound up". Lynott said that there were a few necessary overdubs, but "anything else would have ruined the atmosphere on those recordings and made a mockery of putting out a live album". Robertson has been particularly critical over Visconti's view. He has said the album is almost all live, and the sound levels on stage would make overdubbing impossible due to the lack of acoustic separation between instruments. He claims a recording of "Still In Love With You", featuring a guitar solo he felt was better than the one at the gig that was eventually released, could not be used due to phaser noise on the bass. From this, he concluded that if the bass could not be overdubbed, nothing else could either.

O'Donnell hired Chalkie Davies, a photographer for New Musical Express for two weeks to photograph the band on a US tour in early 1978 in order to capture enough pictures suitable for the album artwork. The front cover, featuring Lynott in the foreground, was originally supposed to be the back cover as the group wanted equal coverage of all members. O'Donnell disagreed and reversed the front and back photographs at the last minute. The album had a working title of Thin Lizzy Live but Lynott decided that Live and Dangerous was better.

Some pressings of the record sleeve include a montage photograph in the studio containing a mirror, straw, razor blade and a rolled up five pound note (as an overt reference to cocaine consumption). Lynott insisted on adding the picture over the rest of the band's objections.

== Release ==
Live and Dangerous

Video by Thin Lizzy
- Released: 1980
- Recorded: 29 March 1978
- Venues: Rainbow Theatre, London
- Genres: Hard rock, blues rock
- Length: 50 minutes
- Label: VCL Video
- Director: Ken O'Neill
- Producer: Archie Gormley

Thin Lizzy video chronology
Live and Dangerous (1980)	Thin Lizzy Live at Sydney Harbour '78 (1988)

Live and Dangerous was released as a double album on 2 June 1978. In the UK, it was released on Vertigo Records and reached a high of No. 2 in the UK album charts, held from the top spot by the Grease soundtrack album. It remained in the charts for 62 weeks and eventually sold 600,000 copies. It was also the first album to be released by Warner Bros. Records in America after the band left Mercury Records in that area. A single from the album, "Rosalie / Cowgirl's Song" backed with a live version of "Me And The Boys", which was a frequent encore but not included on the album, was released in April and reached No. 20 in the UK Singles Chart.

The band began touring to promote the album, but after a one-off gig in Ibiza, Lynott and Robertson had an acrimonious argument. Robertson subsequently quit Thin Lizzy permanently to form Wild Horses with former Rainbow bassist Jimmy Bain. He was replaced by a returning Gary Moore, who had already been a band member in 1974 and 1977.

The album was reissued on CD in 1989. The March 1978 footage from the Rainbow Theatre concert was released a first time in 1980 on VHS by VCL Video and as a 60-minute edit by Castle Communications in 1994 and titled Live & Dangerous. The footage was released on DVD in 2007, with other group performances including a show from their farewell tour on 26 January 1983, and four Top of the Pops clips from the 1970s.

In 2009, the live album Still Dangerous was released, which features material from the 20 October 1977 gig at Philadelphia that was used for some of Live and Dangerous. There is some overlap of tracks between the two albums, though Still Dangerous is completely live with no overdubs.

In 2022, a deluxe box set of the album was released, containing the original live recordings that made up the album. These showed that there was far less overdubbing than previously claimed.

== Reception ==
Professional ratings
Aggregate scores
Source	Rating
Metacritic	100/100 (super deluxe)
Review scores
Source	Rating
AllMusic	4.5/5 stars
Classic Rock	10/10
Collector's Guide to Heavy Metal	9/10
Sputnikmusic	5/5

Stephen Thomas Erlewine of AllMusic described the album as "one of the best double live LPs of the 70s", and "a true live classic", containing more energy and power than the original studio albums. He also praised the "expert song selection". Stuart Bailie in his review for Classic Rock magazine praised the quality of the music and played down rumours of studio overdubbing. NME reviewer Tim Chester declared Live and Dangerous "the best live album we ever heard" despite the alleged overdubs, which he dismissed as irrelevant. Canadian journalist Martin Popoff praised Live and Dangerous for "supercharging some of the old guitar-based tunes that were a bit stiff, dated or under-dressed on studio vinyl" and paired it with UFO's Strangers in the Night as critics' favourite live albums.

Kerrang! magazine listed the album at No. 50 among the "100 Greatest Heavy Metal Albums of All Time".

The album continues to attract critical praise. In 2010 Live and Dangerous was ranked number one in PlanetRock.com's The Greatest Live Album Top 40. The following year, the British music magazine NME ranked Live and Dangerous at No. 1 in its 50 Greatest Live Albums of All Time. In 2015, Rolling Stone put the album at No. 46 in its list of the greatest live albums. The album is included in the 2011 revision of 1001 Albums You Must Hear Before You Die.

== Track listings ==
Side one
No.	Title	Writer(s)	Length
1.	"Jailbreak"	Phil Lynott	4:31
2.	"Emerald"	Brian Downey, Scott Gorham, Lynott, Brian Robertson	4:18
3.	"Southbound"	Lynott	4:44
4.	"Rosalie / Cowgirl's Song"	Bob Seger / Downey, Lynott	4:00

Side two
No.	Title	Writer(s)	Length
5.	"Dancing in the Moonlight (It's Caught Me in Its Spotlight)"	Lynott	3:50
6.	"Massacre"	Downey, Gorham, Lynott	2:46
7.	"Still in Love with You"	Lynott	7:40
8.	"Johnny the Fox Meets Jimmy the Weed"	Downey, Gorham, Lynott	3:32

Side three
No.	Title	Writer(s)	Length
1.	"Cowboy Song"	Downey, Lynott	4:40
2.	"The Boys Are Back in Town"	Lynott	4:30
3.	"Don't Believe a Word"	Lynott	2:05
4.	"Warriors"	Gorham, Lynott	3:52
5.	"Are You Ready"	Downey, Gorham, Lynott, Robertson	2:40

Side four
No.	Title	Writer(s)	Length
6.	"Suicide"	Lynott	5:00
7.	"Sha La La"	Downey, Lynott	4:18
8.	"Baby Drives Me Crazy"	Downey, Gorham, Lynott, Robertson	6:36
9.	"The Rocker"	Eric Bell, Downey, Lynott	3:58

=== Remastered edition ===
A new remastered and expanded version of Live And Dangerous was released in 2011. As well as the full album, remastered by Andy Pearce and Matt Wortham, it featured two additional tracks from the period that were not originally included on the album (although they were later released on the Killers Live EP in 1981). The set also included a DVD with the Rainbow Theatre footage. The sleeve notes were written by Malcolm Dome and included a debate of exactly how much of the album was live and how much was overdubbed.

CD extra tracks
No.	Title	Writer(s)	Length
10.	"Opium Trail"	Downey, Gorham, Lynott	4:43
11.	"Bad Reputation"	Downey, Gorham, Lynott	6:04

DVD

1. "Introduction"/"Rosalie"
2. "The Boys Are Back in Town"
3. "Emerald"
4. "Dancing in the Moonlight (It's Caught Me in Its Spotlight)"
5. "Massacre"
6. "Still in Love with You"
7. "Don't Believe a Word"
8. "Are You Ready"
9. "Sha La La"
10. "Baby Drives Me Crazy"
11. "Finale"/"Me and the Boys"

== Personnel ==
Thin Lizzy

- Phil Lynott – lead vocals, bass guitar
- Scott Gorham – lead and rhythm guitar, backing vocals
- Brian Robertson – lead and rhythm guitar, backing vocals
- Brian Downey – drums, percussion

Additional musicians

- John Earle – saxophone on "Dancing in the Moonlight"
- Huey Lewis (as "Bluesey Huey Lewis") – harmonica on "Baby Drives Me Crazy" (Note: At the time of the recording, John "Irish" Earle was in Graham Parker & the Rumour, and Huey Lewis was in Clover. Both of these groups were support acts for the tours that made up this album.)

Production

- Tony Visconti - producer
- Will Reid Dick, Rod O'Brien - engineers
- Thin Lizzy, Chalkie Davies - cover design
- Chalkie Davies - photography
- Sutton Cooper - artwork

== Charts ==
Chart (1978–79)	Peak position
Australian Albums (Kent Music Report)	20
German Albums (Offizielle Top 100)	41
New Zealand Albums (RMNZ)	17
Swedish Albums (Sverigetopplistan)	27
UK Albums (Official Charts)	2
US Billboard 200	84

Chart (2023)	Peak position
Belgian Albums (Ultratop Flanders)	163
Belgian Albums (Ultratop Wallonia)	131
Dutch Albums (Album Top 100)	81
German Albums (Offizielle Top 100)	11
Irish Albums (Official Charts)	27
Japanese Hot Albums (Billboard Japan)	59
Scottish Albums (Official Charts)	7
Swiss Albums (Schweizer Hitparade)	27

Chart (2026)	Peak position
Greek Albums (IFPI)	88

== Certifications ==
Region	Certification	Certified units/sales
Ireland (IRMA)	Gold	25,000
United Kingdom (BPI)	Platinum	300,000^{^}
United Kingdom (BPI) 2007 DVD	Gold	25,000^{^}
^{^} Shipments figures based on certification alone.
