= Live in Stockholm (EP) =

Live album by John Norum
- Released: 24 January 1990
- Recorded: 14 March 1988
- Venue: Stockholm, Sweden
- Genre: Hard rock
- Length: 17:14
- Label: CBS, Epic
- Producer: John Norum

John Norum chronology
Total Control (1987)	Live in Stockholm (1990)	Face the Truth (1992)

Live in Stockholm is a live EP by John Norum, the guitarist in the Swedish hard rock band Europe. It was released in 1990.

== Track listing ==
1. "Eternal Flame" – 3:40 (John Norum, Marcel Jacob)
2. "Don't Believe a Word" – 3:00 (Phil Lynott)
3. "Bad Reputation" – 3:51 (Brian Downey, Scott Gorham, Phil Lynott) (Japanese bonus track)
4. "Blind" – 3:53 (John Norum, Marcel Jacob)
5. "Free Birds in Flight" (studio recording) – 3:00 (John Norum)

The first 4 live tracks were recorded at the Draken in Stockholm on 14 March 1988. The instrumental song "Free Birds in Flight", previously unreleased, was recorded at Stockholm Recording in 1987.

== Personnel ==
- John Norum – Guitars, lead and backing vocals on tracks 2 & 3
- Göran Edman – Lead vocals on tracks 1 & 4
- Marcel Jacob – Bass
- Henrik Hildén – Drums
- Peter Hermansson – Drums
- Mats Lindfors – Rhythm guitar, keyboards, backing vocals
- Per Blom – Keyboards

== Album credits ==
- Produced by: John Norum
- Mixed by: Per Blom for Peak Productions
