= Leif Sundin =

Swedish singer and songwriter

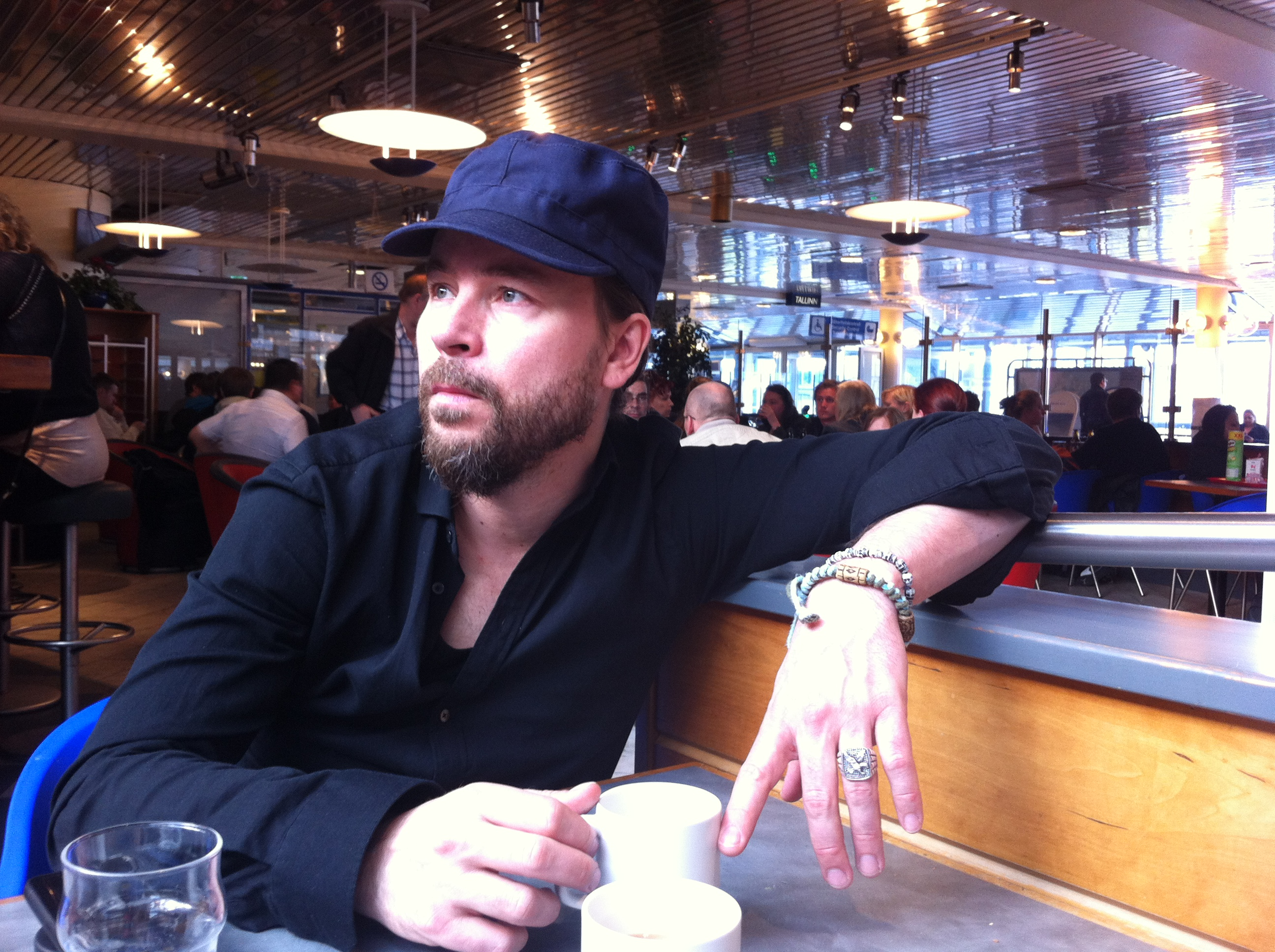

Background information
- Born: Leif Arne Sundin; 22 March 1971 (age 55); Skärholmen, Stockholm, Sweden
- Genres: Hard rock, heavy metal
- Occupations: Musician, singer-songwriter
- Instruments: Vocals, guitar, harmonica, drums
- Years active: 1990–present

Leif Arne Sundin (born 22 March 1971) is a Swedish rock vocalist and songwriter who has performed and recorded with Michael Schenker, John Norum and Brian Robertson among others.

== Career ==
Starting his career as vocalist with Swedish rock band Great King Rat, Sundin was described by Led Zeppelin guitarist Jimmy Page in Kerrang! magazine as "the nearest thing I've seen to a young Paul Rodgers". He later joined the Michael Schenker Group and co-wrote and performed on their 1996 album Written in the Sand, and also featured on a live album the following year. He later rejoined MSG in 2004 after the departure of Chris Logan.

Sundin subsequently joined forces with ex-Europe guitarist John Norum and has provided vocals for a number of his albums, also composing songs. In 2011, Sundin provided vocals for ex-Thin Lizzy and Motörhead guitarist Brian Robertson's solo album Diamonds and Dirt. Sundin has also formed his own band, House of Leaf, releasing an EP and an album in 2012.

== Discography ==
- Treat – The Pleasure Principal (1986), as drummer
- Great King Rat – Great King Rat (1992)
- The Johansson Brothers – The Johansson Brothers (1994)
- Johansson – Sonic Winter (1996)
- Michael Schenker Group – Written in the Sand (1996)
- Michael Schenker Group – The Michael Schenker Story Live (1997)
- John Norum – Face It Live '97 (1997)
- John Norum – Slipped into Tomorrow (1999)
- A-Teens – Teen Spirit (2001)*
- Markoolio – I skuggan av mig själv (2003)*
- Chris Norman – Break Away (2004)*
- Daniel Lindström – Daniel Lindström (2004)*
- Susie – In the Sun (2005)*
- Michael Schenker Group – Tales of Rock'n'Roll (2006)
- Markus Fagervall – Echo Heart (2006)*
- Erik Segerstedt – A Different Shade (2007)*
- John Norum – Play Yard Blues (2010)
- Brian Robertson – Diamonds and Dirt (2011)
- House of Leaf – Wrongs to Right EP (2011)
- House of Leaf – House of Leaf (2012)

* As backing vocalist
