= Don't Believe a Word =

"Don't Believe a Word" may refer to

- "Don't Believe a Word" (Thin Lizzy song)
  - "Don't Believe a Word" (Def Leppard song), cover of the Thin Lizzy song
- "Don't Believe a Word" (Ivy song)
- "Don't Believe a Word" (Third Eye Blind song)
