= Fighting (Thin Lizzy album) =

Studio album by Thin Lizzy
- Released: 12 September 1975
- Recorded: May 1975
- Studio: Olympic (London)
- Genres: Hard rock; blues rock
- Length: 37:56
- Label: Vertigo
- Producer: Phil Lynott

Thin Lizzy chronology
Nightlife (1974)	Fighting (1975)	Jailbreak (1976)

Alternative cover
- Cover of the North American releases

Fighting is the fifth studio album by Irish rock band Thin Lizzy, released in 1975. Following the release of four studio albums, the band finally forged an identifiable sound featuring the twin guitars of Scott Gorham and Brian Robertson. This sound draws from hard rock, folk, pop and rhythm and blues. It set the stage for the big commercial breakthrough of the follow-up album, Jailbreak. The album was also their first album to chart in the UK, hitting No. 60.

== Songs ==
The track "Suicide" was originally performed by Thin Lizzy when guitarist Eric Bell was still in the band, including on a BBC broadcast recorded in July 1973. It was first performed with different lyrics under the title "Baby's Been Messing", and lacked the middle section that appears on Fighting. The non-album track "Half-Caste" was released on the B-side of the original "Rosalie" single. Another track recorded at the Fighting sessions was "Try a Little Harder", which was eventually released on the Vagabonds, Kings, Warriors, Angels boxed set in 2002.

Fighting is the only Thin Lizzy album aside from their 1971 debut where band members other than Phil Lynott receive sole songwriting credits for certain tracks. Bell wrote "Ray Gun" on the debut, and Robertson and Gorham wrote "Silver Dollar" and "Ballad of a Hard Man", respectively.

Although the distinctive Thin Lizzy logo (designed by Jim Fitzpatrick) was frequently used on compilation albums, merchandise and as stage scenery at the band's gigs over the years, this was the only Thin Lizzy studio album to feature it on the cover.

Europe guitarist John Norum covered "Wild One" on his 1987 debut solo album Total Control, and Europe covered "Suicide" on their 2008 live album Almost Unplugged.

== Reception ==
Professional ratings
Review scores
Source	Rating
AllMusic	4.5/5 stars
Collector's Guide to Heavy Metal	10/10

Stephen Thomas Erlewine of AllMusic described Fighting as a "tense, coiled, vicious rock & roll album", with which Thin Lizzy began their classic era. Highlighting Gorham and Robertson's twin-guitar interplay, he described this line-up as "vital and visceral", and added that Lynott had made a leap forward as a songwriter, "fully flourishing as a rock & roll poet". In his Collector's Guide to Heavy Metal Martin Popoff called Fighting a "soulful, stirring hard rock classic", where "Robertson and Gorham's fluid guitar harmonies become an integral part of the Lizzy sound, woven in the very fabric of the arrangements" and "the tales of outlaws and outcasts" reach "a fairly grandiose, history-encompassing, tragic scale."

"I was a Lizzy fan," recalled Sounds writer and future Kerrang! founder Geoff Barton, "but Fighting just didn't cut it for me at the time. 'The band's second LP with their new twin-guitar line-up is an adequate rock album, no more,' I wrote. 'This one suffers from the familiar Lizzy studio trait: lack of any real energy or aggression.' The following month I went to see Lizzy live… About halfway through the show, Phil went into a bit of a diatribe against rock critics and I wondered if he knew I was in the audience. It turned out he did! At the end of the monologue, Phil just kind of shrugged his shoulders and said, with a wry smile on his face, 'But, no matter what, this next song is for Geoff Barton: Still in Love with You.' That was probably the most humbling moment of my entire career."

== Track listings ==
Side one
No.	Title	Writer(s)	Length
1.	"Rosalie" (Bob Seger cover)	Bob Seger	3:11
2.	"For Those Who Love to Live"	Brian Downey, Phil Lynott	3:08
3.	"Suicide"	Lynott	5:12
4.	"Wild One"	Lynott	4:18
5.	"Fighting My Way Back"	Lynott	3:12

Side two
No.	Title	Writer(s)	Length
6.	"King's Vengeance"	Scott Gorham, Lynott	4:08
7.	"Spirit Slips Away"	Lynott	4:35
8.	"Silver Dollar"	Brian Robertson	3:26
9.	"Freedom Song"	Gorham, Lynott	3:32
10.	"Ballad of a Hard Man"	Gorham	3:14

=== Remastered edition ===
A remastered 2-CD set deluxe edition of Fighting was released on 12 March 2012.

Disc two
No.	Title	Writer(s)	Length
1.	"Half Caste" (B-side of the single "Rosalie")	Lynott	3:39
2.	"Rosalie" (US album mix)		2:57
3.	"Half Caste" (BBC Session, 29 May 1975)		3:52
4.	"Rosalie" (BBC Session, 29 May 1975)		3:15
5.	"Suicide" (BBC Session, 29 May 1975)		5:19
6.	"Ballad of a Hard Man" (false starts, no vocal)		4:08
7.	"Try a Little Harder" (alternate vocal)	Lynott, Robertson	4:08
8.	"Fighting My Way Back" (rough mix with alternate vocal)		3:24
9.	"Song for Jesse" (no vocals)	Lynott	2:14
10.	"Leaving Town" (acoustic, bass and drums – no vocals)	Lynott	4:52
11.	"Blues Boy"	Robertson	4:34
12.	"Leaving Town" (extended take)		5:52
13.	"Spirit Slips Away" (extended version – take four)		5:31
14.	"Wild One" (no vocals)		4:18
15.	"Bryan's Funky Fazer (Silver Dollar)"	Robertson	3:38
Total length:			61:41

== Singles ==
- "Rosalie" / "Half Caste" – 27 June 1975
- "Wild One" / "For Those Who Love to Live" – 17 October 1975

In the US and Canada, "Wild One" was released with "Freedom Song" as the B-side, and in Greece with "Rosalie" as the B-side.

== Personnel ==
Thin Lizzy

- Phil Lynott – lead vocals, bass guitar, acoustic guitar on "Wild One"
- Scott Gorham – lead and rhythm guitar
- Brian Robertson – lead and rhythm guitar, backing vocals, piano on "Song for Jesse"
- Brian Downey – drums, percussion

Additional musicians

- Roger Chapman (from Family) – backing vocals on "Rosalie"
- Ian McLagan (from Faces) – piano on "Rosalie" and "Silver Dollar"

Production

- Keith Harwood – engineer and mixing
- Jeremy Gee – assistant engineer
- Gilbert Kong – mastering

== Charts ==
Chart (1975)	Peak position
Swedish Albums (Sverigetopplistan)	49
UK Albums (Official Charts)	60
