= Face It =

Face It may refer to:

- "Face It", a song by Kansas from Vinyl Confessions, 1982
- Face It (album), by Golden Earring, 1994
- Face It Live '97, an album by John Norum, 1998
- "Face It", a song by NF from Mansion, 2015
- "Face it", a 2019 autobiographical book by rock singer Debbie Harry
- Face It, vocalist with the Danish band Kaliber
