= Diamonds and Dirt =

Studio album by Brian Robertson
- Released: 25 March 2011 (UK); 5 April 2011 (USA)
- Recorded: 2008–10; Polar Studios, Stockholm
- Genre: Blues rock, hard rock
- Length: 53:38
- Label: Steamhammer
- Producer: Chris Laney, Brian Robertson, Søren Lindberg

Professional ratings
Review scores
Source	Rating
Sea Of Tranquility	3/5 stars
Dangerdog Music Reviews	5/5 stars

Diamonds and Dirt is the first solo studio album by Scottish guitarist Brian Robertson, released in 2011. Robertson was previously a member of Thin Lizzy, Motörhead and Wild Horses.

Robertson recruited several experienced musicians for the recording of this album, including Treat bass guitarist Nalle Påhlsson and Europe drummer Ian Haugland, who Robertson described as "the best rhythm section I've played with since Phil Lynott and Brian Downey". Ex-Michael Schenker Group vocalist Leif Sundin performed most of the vocals, but the album also features Robertson himself and Riverdogs singer Rob Lamothe singing on one track each.

The album includes some tracks by Robertson's old group Thin Lizzy: "It's Only Money" from the 1974 album Nightlife, two versions of "Running Back" from the 1976 album Jailbreak, and "Blues Boy", a track recorded by the band but never officially released until it appeared as a bonus track on the deluxe edition of the Jailbreak album. "Blues Boy" was co-written by Robertson and Phil Lynott, while the other two songs were composed by Lynott alone. Robertson has stated, "I think Phil would be proud of what I've done with those Lizzy songs." Robertson also recorded three songs written by his friend Frankie Miller, including a bonus track, "Ain't Got No Money". Robertson initially sang the song himself, but Miller suggested it would suit a different vocalist, so Rob Lamothe was brought in.

== Track listing ==
All tracks are written by Brian Robertson, except where noted.

No.	Title	Writer(s)	Length
1.	"Diamonds and Dirt"		4:21
2.	"Passion"		4:30
3.	"It's Only Money"	Phil Lynott	3:19
4.	"Mail Box"	Frankie Miller	4:17
5.	"Running Back"	Lynott	4:03
6.	"Texas Wind"		3:43
7.	"Devil in My Soul"		4:04
8.	"Do It Till We Drop (Drop It)"	Miller, Jeff Barry, Robertson	4:04
9.	"Blues Boy"	Robertson, Lynott	5:22
10.	"That's All...!"		5:00
11.	"10 Miles to Go on a 9 Mile Road"	Jim White	4:57
12.	"Running Back" (slow version)	Lynott	5:58

Bonus track
No.	Title	Writer(s)	Length
13.	"Ain't Got No Money"	Miller	4:59

== Personnel ==
- Brian Robertson – guitar, keyboards; vocals on "10 Miles to Go on a 9 Mile Road"
- Leif Sundin – vocals
- Nalle Påhlsson – bass guitar, backing vocals
- Ian Haugland – drums, percussion
- Liny Wood – backing vocals
- Rickard Jakobson – percussion

with

- Chris Antblad – piano on "Running Back"
- Rob Lamothe – vocals on "Ain't Got No Money"
- Ola Gustafsson – dobro on "Running Back" (Slow version)
- Ellinor Asp – backing vocals on "Ain't Got No Money"
- Håkan Persson – drums on "Ain't Got No Money"
