= Foundry (band) =

American rock band

- Origin: Las Vegas
- Genres: Rock, hard rock, heavy metal
- Years active: 2014–present
- Label: Facet Entertainment Foundry Records
- Members: Marc Brattin; Chris iOrio; Kevin Lacerda; Merry Adin
- Past members: Mark Boals; Bjorn Englen; Kelly Keeling; Scott Griffin
- Website: FoundryRocks.com

Foundry is an American rock band from Las Vegas created by drummer Marc Brattin and producer Colin Brittain. While rooted in classic rock, Foundry has scored nine Top 40 hits in Mainstream Rock. Their live shows, produced by Metallica's Mike Gillies, feature a distinct Las Vegas vibe. Foundry has performed with Nickelback, Rob Zombie, Disturbed, Godsmack, Staind, Papa Roach, and more.

== History ==
In 2026, led by drummer and serial entrepreneur Marc Brattin, Foundry has taken a broader approach to building a modern music brand. The band has expanded its identity into the global beverage market with Foundry American Pale Ale and Hard Rock Roast Coffee. The lifestyle products have gained popularity with fans and consumers, giving audiences another way to enjoy Foundry beyond recordings and performances.

Since 2022, Foundry has evolved into a high-energy rock band, known for hard rock originals, classic song remakes, and a Las Vegas-style live show. The band also performs acoustic renditions of their songs, putting more focus on its vocal harmonies. And under the moniker "The Star Spangled Singers" Foundry often performs the American National Anthem at sporting events across the United States.

Beginning in 2018, Foundry has focused on releasing singles, starting with their first radio hit, “Intoxicate,” which spent an unprecedented 16 weeks on the mainstream rock charts Top 40. They also dropped original tracks “Not This Time” and “Thunder Rolls,” all produced by Linkin Park's Colin Brittain. Additionally, the band released re-imagined versions of Lady Gaga's “Poker Face” (2019) and Pink Floyd's “Money” (2020). That year, in response to the pandemic's impact on live music, Foundry hosted a groundbreaking July 4 livestream tribute to America. By leveraging innovative technology, the event brought audiences together virtually, fostering connection and celebrating the spirit of humankind.

In December 2014, Foundry made their debut with the single "Vegas Baby!" This was followed by the release of their self-titled debut album in January 2015. The album features rock vocalist Kelly Keeling, and was mixed by 7X Grammy-producer Steve Thompson, alongside engineer Matt Breunig, known for his work with the Killers. It also highlights Count's 77 guitarist Stoney Curtis and keyboardist Erik Norlander. Additional contributions from Mark Boals, Scott Griffin, and Bjorn Englen, played crucial roles in advancing Foundry's transition from the recording studio to the performance stage.

== Singles ==
Title	Year	Chart Positions	Album
Title	Year	USA	Album
"Vegas Baby!"	2014	—	Foundry
"Thunder Rolls"	2019	34	Non-album singles
"Poker Face"	2019	—	Non-album singles
"Intoxicate"	2019	28	Non-album singles
"Not This Time"	2019	30	Non-album singles
"Money"	2020	—	Non-album singles
"Let You Go"	2021	35	Non-album singles
"Another Way"	2021	24	Non-album singles
"Waiting for You"	2021	33	Non-album singles
"Crocodile Tears"	2023	18	Non-album singles
"30,000 Feet"	2024	15	Non-album singles
“Primadonna”	2025	10	Non-album singles

== Discography ==
Foundry, released January 2015

No.	Title	Length
1.	"Blinded"	3:18
2.	"Mind Radio"	2:31
3.	"Get Over It"	3:09
4.	"Rolling Stoned"	3:06
5.	"Calling Allah"	6:03
6.	"Hell Raiser"	3:09
7.	"Shake"	2:55
8.	"False Alarm"	3:41
9.	"Television"	3:24
10.	"Vegas Baby!"	2:52
