= Quality Street Gang =

Group of criminals operating in Manchester, England

The Quality Street Gang operated in Manchester, England, in the 1960s, 1970s and 1980s. Although considered by some senior officers in the Greater Manchester Police to be the instigators of much of Manchester's major crime, some maintain that the gang was nothing more than a “social friendship between a group of men”, most of whom came from Ancoats.

== Name ==
The group was reportedly named after a 1960s TV advertisement for Quality Street confectionery which showed an eclectic and smartly dressed group of people. Once when the "gang" walked into a pub someone supposedly shouted "Hey it's the Quality Street Gang" and the name stuck. Another story says the name came about because most of the gang members were overweight.

== History ==
The gang is supposed to have existed from the 1960s to the 1980s. There is an urban legend that says some of them met the Kray twins at Manchester Piccadilly persuading them to return to London, which they did the next day. However, senior members of Greater Manchester Police have said that in the entire time the gang was supposed to exist not a single member was ever arrested or convicted of any crime, making some doubt the Quality Street Gang were ever a group of organised criminals.

Manchester United football hooligan Colin Blaney claims that members of the Quality Street Gang had links to a criminal element within the gang associated with the club known as the Inter City Jibbers, and carried out armed robberies together in Holland. His book includes a photograph alleged to show a Quality Street Gang member at the wedding of Inter City Jibbers member John "The Grid" McKee, whom Blaney alleges was also heavily involved in the Dutch underworld.

In 1986, John Stalker, the Deputy Chief Constable of Greater Manchester Police, was suspended over accusations that he had attended social events at which members of the gang were present. Stalker was later cleared.

== References in contemporary culture ==
Alex Murphy referred to Salford's successful rugby league team of the 1960s and 1970s as the Quality Street Gang.

The Thin Lizzy song "The Boys Are Back in Town" is believed to be a reference to the Quality Street Gang, as also was their song "Johnny the Fox Meets Jimmy the Weed". Jimmy the Weed was the nickname for Jimmy Donnelly, who was for many years associated with the gang. Philomena Lynott, the mother of Phil Lynott, the singer/songwriter of the band, ran the Clifton Grange Hotel in Whalley Range at the time and it was there that some of the alleged gang members met, along with showbusiness people and sports stars such as George Best. The band became friendly with these people.
