= Optimus (album) =

Studio album by John Norum
- Released: 23 February 2005
- Studios: LBR Studios, Stockholm, Sweden
- Genre: Heavy metal
- Length: 37:49
- Labels: Mascot (Europe); Victor Entertainment (Japan)
- Producer: John Norum

John Norum chronology
Slipped into Tomorrow (1999)	Optimus (2005)	Play Yard Blues (2010)

Optimus is the sixth solo album by John Norum, the guitarist in the Swedish hard rock band Europe. It was released in 2005 on Mascot Records.

== Track listing ==
1. "Chase Down the Moon" - 3:50 (John Norum, Thomas Torberg)
2. "Nailed to the Cross" - 3:32 (Norum, Fredrik Åkesson)
3. "Better Day" - 3:56 (Norum, Michelle Meldrum)
4. "One More Time" - 3:41 (Norum)
5. "Time to Run" - 4:13 (Norum, Glenn Hughes, Meldrum, Karen Kreutzer)
6. "Optimus - 3:06 (Norum, Karen Hunter)
7. "Takin' the Blame" - 3:55 (Norum)
8. "Change Will Come" - 3:35 (Norum)
9. "Forced" - 3:37 (Norum, Åkesson)
10. "Solitude" - 4:23 (Norum)
11. "Natural Thing" [live] (Michael Schenker, Phil Mogg, Pete Way) - bonus track on the Japanese edition

== Personnel ==
- John Norum - lead vocals, guitars
- Thomas Torberg - bass
- Ricard "Huxflux" Nettermalm - drums

Guests

- Fredrik Åkesson - additional rhythm guitar on tracks 2 & 9
- Mats Lindfors - keyboards on tracks 4 & 6

== Album credits ==
- John Norum - producer, mixing and engineering
- Mats Lindfors - mixing and engineering
