= Kelly Keeling =

American rock musician (born 1966)

- Born: Kelly Wayne Keeling; June 25, 1966 (age 60)
- Origin: Lafayette, Louisiana, U.S.
- Genres: Hard rock, blues rock, heavy metal, progressive metal
- Occupations: Singer, musician, songwriter, record producer
- Instruments: Vocals, guitar, bass, piano
- Years active: 1980–present

Kelly Keeling is an American musician, singer, and songwriter. He began his musical journey at the age of 14 and gained early recognition as the lead vocalist of the heavy metal band Baton Rouge. Over the course of his career, Keeling has collaborated with renowned hard rock acts including; Alice Cooper, Whitesnake, Blue Murder, Dokken, Michael Schenker Group, and Trans-Siberian Orchestra. In addition to his extensive solo work, Keeling is also an occasional singer-songwriter and bassist for the band Foundry, who is produced by Linkin Park's Colin Brittain.

== Discography ==
=== Studio albums ===
- Giving Sight to the Eye (2005)
- Lime Green Limousine with Marc Zimmerman (2010)
- Mind Radio (2015)

=== with Baton Rouge ===
- Shake Your Soul (1990)
- Lights Out on the Playground (1991)
- Baton Rouge (1997)

=== with John Norum ===
- Another Destination (1995)
- Worlds Away (1996)
- "Terror Over Me" (2022)

=== with Carmine Appice's Guitar Zeus ===
- Carmine Appice's Guitar Zeus (1995)
- Guitar Zeus II: Channel Mind Radio (1997)
- Conquering Heroes (2009)

=== with Michael Schenker Group ===
- The Unforgiven (1999)
- The Unforgiven World Tour Live (1999)
- "Big Deal (False Alarms)" (2006)

=== with King Kobra ===
- Hollywood Trash (2001)

=== with Heaven and Earth ===
- Windows to the World (2001)

=== with Erik Norlander ===
- Music Machine (2003)
- Stars Rain Down (2004)
- Live in St. Petersburg (2006)
- Hommage Symphonique (2007)

=== with George Lynch ===
- Furious George (2004)

=== with Paris Keeling ===
- End of Ride (2006)
- End of Ride Revisited (2009)

=== with O'2L ===
- Eat a Pickle (2007)

=== with Foundry ===
- Foundry (2015)

=== Guest appearances ===
- Alice Cooper – Hey Stoopid (songwriting and backing vocals – 1991)
- Blue Murder – Nothin' but Trouble (backing vocals, lead vocals on "I'm On Fire" – 1993)
- Dokken – Long Way Home (songwriting – 2002)
- Jack Ponti Presents – Volume 1 (compilation – 2003)
- Dokken – Hell to Pay (songwriting – harmony vocals acoustic guitar 2004)
- Lana Lane – Lady Macbeth (backing vocals – 2005)
- Moonstone Project – Time to Take a Stand (guest vocalist – 2006)
- JK Northrup – Wired in My Skin (guest vocalist – 2007)
- The Screamin' Lords – Long Live Me (guest vocalist – 2007)
- Liberty N' Justice – Independence Day (guest vocalist – 2007)
- The Rocket Scientists – Looking Backward – The 2007 Sessions (guest vocalist- 2007)
- Lana Lane – Gemini (backing vocals – 2007)
- Don Dokken – Solitary (backing vocals four songs green Venice few others and acoustic guitars – 2008)
- Trans-Siberian Orchestra – Night Castle (backing vocals – 2009)
- Moonstone Project – Hidden in Time (guest vocalist – 2009)
- Liberty N' Justice – Light It Up (guest vocalist – 2010)
- Chris Bickley – Tapestry of souls (guest vocalist – 2012)
- Foundry – Foundry (songwriting and lead vocals – 2015)

=== Soundtrack appearances ===
Title	Release	Contribution	Other artist(s)	Soundtrack
"Heart of the Fire"	1991	Songwriting	Jeff Scott Soto, Cherie Currie	Rich Girl
	1998			Totally Irresponsible
"Couldn't Be Better"	2000	Songwriting, vocals	Carmine Appice	Dish Dogs
"Where You Belong"	2000	Songwriting, vocals	Carmine Appice's Guitar Zeus	Dish Dogs
"Angels"	2001	Vocals	Carmine Appice	Chasing Destiny
"Upchuck Woolery"	2001	Songwriting	Richard Mann, Planet X	Killer Bud
"Hell Yeah"	2001	Songwriting, vocals		Killer Bud
"Cartune Reality"	2001	Songwriting, vocals		Killer Bud
"Free"	2010	Songwriting	Paris Keeling	Kill Speed
