= Another Destination =

Studio album by John Norum
- Released: 23 May 1995
- Genre: Hard rock, Heavy metal
- Length: 54:44
- Label: CBS, Epic (Europe / Japan); Shrapnel (USA)
- Producer: John Norum, Wyn Davis

John Norum chronology
Face the Truth (1992)	Another Destination (1995)	Worlds Away (1996)

Professional ratings
Review scores
Source	Rating
Allmusic	4/5 stars

Another Destination is the third solo album by John Norum, who is best known as the guitarist of the Swedish hard rock band Europe. It was released on 23 May 1995.

The album features two cover versions: "Strange Days", originally recorded by Humble Pie, and "Sunshine of Your Love" by Cream.

== Track listing ==
1. "Inside" (John Norum, Alan Lorber, Michelle Meldrum) – 5:06
2. "Resurrection Time" (J. Norum, Kelly Keeling, A. Lorber) – 5:05
3. "Strange Days" (Steve Marriott) – 4:59
4. "Spirit World" (J. Norum, K. Keeling, Scott Bender) – 5:16
5. "Shimmering Highs" (J. Norum) – 6:10
6. "Whose Side Are You On?" (J. Norum, K. Keeling) – 5:02
7. "Sunshine of Your Love" (Jack Bruce, Pete Brown, Eric Clapton) – 5:28
8. "Catalina Sunset" (J. Norum, Billy White) – 5:20
9. "Half Way Home" (J. Norum, K. Keeling) – 5:20
10. "Healing Rays" (J. Norum, K. Keeling) – 3:06
11. "Jillanna" (J. Norum, B. White) – 3:35

== Personnel ==
- John Norum – vocals, guitars
- Kelly Keeling – vocals, keyboards
- Tom Lilly – bass guitar
- Gary Ferguson – drums

== Album credits ==
- John Norum - producer
- Wyn Davis - producer, engineer
