= Play Yard Blues =

Studio album by John Norum
- Released: 17 May 2010; 5 July 2010 (UK)
- Recorded: Playyard Studios, Sweden
- Genre: Hard rock, blues rock
- Label: Mascot Records
- Producer: John Norum

John Norum chronology
| Optimus (2005) | Play Yard Blues (2010) |

Play Yard Blues is a solo album by Europe guitarist John Norum. It was released on 17 May 2010.

The album includes cover versions of the Thin Lizzy song "It's Only Money", the Frank Marino & Mahogany Rush song "Ditch Queen", and the Mountain song "Travellin' in the Dark".

== Track listing ==
1. "Let it Shine" (Norum, Torberg) – 4:55
2. "Red Light Green High" (Norum, Torberg) – 4:12
3. "It's Only Money" (Lynott) – 2:54
4. "Got My Eyes on You" (Norum, Sundin) – 3:14
5. "When Darkness Falls" (Norum, Torberg, Stappe) – 4:01
6. "Over and Done" (Norum, Stappe) – 3:51
7. "Ditch Queen" (Marino) – 5:41
8. "Travellin' in the Dark" (Pappalardi, Collins) – 4:11
9. "Born Again" (Norum, Sundin) – 4:13
10. "Play Yard Blues" (Norum) – 4:08

== Personnel ==
Band

- John Norum – guitars, vocals
- Tomas Torberg – bass
- Thomas Broman – drums
- Peer Stappe – percussion

Additional personnel

- Leif Sundin – vocals on "Got My Eyes on You" and "Born Again"
- Mic Michaeli – keyboards

Production

- Recorded at Playyard Studios, Sweden
- Engineered by Peer Stappe
- Produced by John Norum
- Mixed at Polar Studios in Stockholm by Peer Stappe and John Norum
- Mastered by Bjorn Engelman at Cutting Room

Cover art

- Photography by Paul Bergen
- Graphic design by Misha van Tol

== Chart positions ==
| Chart (2010) | Peak position |
|---|---|
| Swedish Album Chart | 36 |
