= Johnny the Fox =

- Cover art by Jim Fitzpatrick

Studio album by Thin Lizzy
- Released: October 1976
- Recorded: August 1976
- Studio: Ramport (London)
- Genres: Hard rock; blues rock
- Length: 35:37
- Label: Vertigo
- Producer: John Alcock

Thin Lizzy chronology
Jailbreak (1976)	Johnny the Fox (1976)	Bad Reputation (1977)

Singles from Johnny the Fox
- 1. "Johnny the Fox Meets Jimmy the Weed" Released: 30 July 1976 (US); 2. "Don't Believe a Word" Released: 26 November 1976; 3. "Rocky" Released: 1976

Johnny the Fox is the seventh studio album by Irish hard rock band Thin Lizzy, released in October 1976. This album was written and recorded while bassist/vocalist Phil Lynott was recovering from a bout of hepatitis that put him off the road halfway through the previous Jailbreak tour. "Don't Believe a Word" was a British hit single. Johnny the Fox was the last Thin Lizzy studio album on which guitarist Brian Robertson featured as a full member of the band, as the personality clashes between him and Lynott resulted in Robertson being sacked, reinstated, and later sacked again.

== Recording ==
Once Phil Lynott had returned to the UK from Thin Lizzy's aborted US tour in June 1976, when the band had been scheduled to support Rainbow, he spent time in hospital in Manchester recovering from hepatitis. He had an acoustic guitar with him and wrote the songs for Johnny the Fox during June and July, with one outing to play a gig at Hammersmith Odeon on 11 July. After his release from hospital, Lynott joined the other members of the band and travelled to Munich in August to record the album at Musicland Studios with producer John Alcock. Alcock has said that the decision to record outside the UK was for tax reasons.

Early in the recording process, it became clear that neither the band nor the production team were happy with the studios or the recording process, and they experienced particular trouble obtaining a satisfactory drum sound. Lynott was still finishing the songwriting and, according to Alcock, the band were arguing about musical direction. On 6 August, they abandoned the sessions and returned to Ramport Studios in Battersea, London, (where the previous Jailbreak album had been recorded), and Olympic Studios in Barnes. Brian Robertson has said that there was plenty of material from which to choose for the album, up to eight or nine tracks apart from the ten that appeared on the final release. However, Alcock claims that the album suffered because Lynott needed more time to finish the songs, and that some tracks, like "Boogie Woogie Dance", were not strong enough to make the album.

=== Songs ===
Lynott and Robertson clashed over musical differences, such as the composition of "Don't Believe a Word". When Lynott first played the song in a slow 12-bar blues format, Robertson claimed it was "shite" and Lynott reacted badly, disappearing for a few days. Robertson then felt that he may have been a little harsh, and he and drummer Brian Downey decided to rework the song. Downey devised a faster shuffle rhythm and Robertson wrote the riff, and Lynott was pleased with the outcome when he returned to the studio. Robertson was annoyed when the song was credited solely to Lynott, as he felt that all three members involved should have been credited. The original bluesy arrangement was subsequently recorded by Lynott and Gary Moore on Moore's Back on the Streets in 1978, and Thin Lizzy versions later appeared on Thin Lizzy's 1983 double live album Life and the deluxe edition of Thunder and Lightning.

Robertson also co-wrote "Borderline" with Lynott, for which he did receive a writing credit. He later revealed that the song was about a girlfriend: "I was really in love, [but] she hated me. I was extremely down when I wrote it." Alcock confirmed that Robertson had significant lyrical input on this track, and that the band's other guitarist Scott Gorham had similar influence on the lyrics for "Sweet Marie".

According to Robertson, Lynott wrote "Rocky" with him in mind. John Alcock has stated that "Massacre" was written in the studio. Its lyrics came after Lynott was visited in hospital by a Protestant clergyman, and Catholic Lynott became defensive. Later he regretted his reaction, and wrote the lyric condemning religious prejudice.

"Fools Gold" was inspired by the Great Famine of Ireland of 1845–52. The lyric imagines Irish people travelling to America to escape the famine and start a new life.

The album included two tracks with the name "Johnny" in their titles as well as the album title itself, a character by that name having appeared in earlier songs such as "Showdown" and "The Boys Are Back in Town". Gorham noted the name's proliferation: "Phil should've been this guy's publicity agent, as he was cropping up everywhere!"

"'Johnny the Fox meets Jimmy the Weed' was really the only song that Lizzy did in a funk style..." noted Scott Gorham. "Phil Lynott was a huge fan of the O'Jays and their song "For the Love of Money". At every soundcheck, he'd be playing that funky riff... Once we'd found that riff, we just went for it. The whole thing really took off when Brian Downey sat down and put his personal funk take on it with the drums... And these characters – Johnny the Fox and Jimmy the Weed – they were real people. They were from the Manchester area, where Phil's mom had her hotel... They were part of a gang of cultured thieves... They weren't drug dealers, like it says in the lyrics for the song... But they were pretty heavy guys, yet they were real funny, so you couldn't help but like them."

=== Backing musicians ===
Phil Collins of Genesis was brought in to contribute some percussion to one or more tracks, seemingly because he was a friend of Lynott's. Robertson later said, "Collins was just a mate of Phil's... I think Phil probably just wanted to get him on the album to name-drop." Neither Robertson nor Downey was able to remember which songs Collins played on.

Irish musician Fiachra Trench provided string arrangements, for example on "Sweet Marie", on which he used one bank of violins and two viola sections. Trench also contributed a brass arrangement to "Johnny", while Kim Beacon of String Driven Thing sang backing vocals. Again, none of the band members could recall which song(s) Beacon appeared on. Robertson claimed that Beacon was only used because Frankie Miller was unavailable.

== Album cover ==
Thin Lizzy used their usual cover artist, Jim Fitzpatrick, to design the sleeve for Johnny the Fox, but he was asked to provide the finished design before the album was given a title. When Lynott asked him for something Celtic, but not the usual kind of Celtic rock design, Fitzpatrick drew a complicated neo-gothic Celtic border with a disc in the centre, left blank for the title and central design. When the deadline was approaching and he grew desperate to finish it, he asked Lynott for any idea of a title to inspire him. Lynott replied, "Ah, call it Johnny the Fox, that'll do." Fitzpatrick reminded him that there was no track with that title on the album, and Lynott replied, "No-one will notice, Jim. The album will be massive." Fitzpatrick subsequently drew the fox design and added the title. An idea of a cut-out with the fox's head showing through was rejected by the record company.

An earlier Fitzpatrick design had the same border with the figure of a warrior in the centre, but both Lynott and Fitzpatrick felt that the fox represented a sort of "outsider" character, much like the panther on the cover of Thin Lizzy's 1974 album, Nightlife.

== Album release and tour ==
Johnny the Fox was released in October 1976, and reached No. 11 on the UK Albums Chart. The single "Don't Believe a Word" reached No.12 on the UK Singles Chart and No.2 on the Irish Singles Chart. Thin Lizzy toured the UK during October and November, supported by American band Clover, led by Huey Lewis. The tour was successful enough that an extra date was added at the Hammersmith Odeon in November. There was also a successful appearance on Rod Stewart's BBC TV special A Night on the Town in the UK, where Thin Lizzy upstaged their host by playing live, whereas Stewart mimed.

The tour was scheduled to continue in the US in late November, but was cancelled after Robertson suffered a hand injury in a fight at the Speakeasy Club in London. Robertson's friend Frankie Miller was about to be attacked with a glass bottle by the Gonzalez guitarist Gordon Hunte and Robertson tried to intervene. The bottle cut his hand, badly damaging an artery and a nerve, preventing him from playing guitar effectively for several months. The tour was postponed until January 1977, when Thin Lizzy began a three-month US tour opening for Queen with Gary Moore standing in for Robertson.

== Reception ==
Professional ratings
Review scores
Source	Rating
AllMusic	4/5 stars
Classic Rock	7/10 stars
Collector's Guide to Heavy Metal	10/10
Melody Maker	(favourable)

Harry Doherty of Melody Maker, comparing the album to Jailbreak, wrote that there was "more subtlety, the melodies are stronger, and, most importantly, the scope of the material is much wider than the hard rock associated with Lizzy", showing a band more versatile than on the previous recording. To the contrary, Stephen Thomas Erlewine of AllMusic stated that Johnny the Fox fell short in comparison to the previous album, Jailbreak, suggesting that the album veered toward "an odd, half-baked concept album", despite showing the same strengths as its predecessor, i.e. Lynott's lyrics and the group's musical power. Praising "Don't Believe a Word" and "Borderline" as great moments, he said that the album "never falls flat", but is "never quite as gripping as Jailbreak". Canadian journalist Martin Popoff considered Johnny the Fox Thin Lizzy's first real masterpiece and described it as "a rich textural work of melodic, soft-edged metal, lyrically soulful, melancholy, in many places tragic". Stuart Bailie, reviewing the 2011 reissue for Classic Rock, described the album as "an exercise in tight, rousing tunes with the chiming Les Paul guitars and Phil's patented blarney", but wrote that the bonus tracks were "less revealing" than on other Thin Lizzy expanded editions.

In 1991, Chuck Eddy ranked Johnny the Fox at number 448 in his list of the best heavy metal albums, believing that although it does not cohere well, it is laudable how the "concise crunch" of the guitarists "weave through the beat like in a funk band", and drew attention to the Led Zeppelin-esque funk of "Boogie Woogie Dance" and "Massacre" and how the paradoxical wordplay of "Don't Believe a Word" is reminiscent of early Smokey Robinson, while noting "Johnny the Fox Meets Jimmy the Weed" presages the rap rock of Run-DMC. Eddy also wonders whether the character-heavy album is "supposed to be a rock opera – a working class-mythos fugitive-kid-shooting drugstore-attendant saga".

The track "Johnny the Fox Meets Jimmy the Weed" features on the Ultimate Breaks and Beats series of compilation albums.

== Track listings ==
Side one
No.	Title	Writer(s)	Length
1.	"Johnny"	Phil Lynott	4:18
2.	"Rocky"	Brian Downey, Scott Gorham, Lynott	3:43
3.	"Borderline"	Lynott, Brian Robertson	4:37
4.	"Don't Believe a Word"	Lynott	2:18
5.	"Fools Gold"	Lynott	3:53

Side two
No.	Title	Writer(s)	Length
6.	"Johnny the Fox Meets Jimmy the Weed"	Downey, Gorham, Lynott	3:36
7.	"Old Flame"	Lynott	3:05
8.	"Massacre"	Downey, Gorham, Lynott	3:01
9.	"Sweet Marie"	Gorham, Lynott	3:58
10.	"Boogie Woogie Dance"	Lynott	3:06

=== Remastered edition ===
On 24 January 2011, a new remastered and expanded edition of Johnny the Fox was released. This new edition is a 2-CD set, with the original album on disc one, and bonus material on disc two.

However, the track listing on the back cover is incorrect, as it accidentally lists "Johnny the Fox Meets..." (BBC Session) twice. Also the track listing on the back of the CD booklet is wrong as well. That lists "Don't Believe a Word" three times when only two versions appear. The correct track listing is listed below.

Only the bonus material on disc two has been remastered in 2010 (despite what it says on the back of the CD booklet). Disc one uses the same remaster as the 1996 edition. New remasters were made, but scrapped at the last minute before the release, for reasons unknown.

Disc two
No.	Title	Writer(s)	Length
1.	"Don't Believe a Word" (remixed version)		2:21
2.	"Johnny" (remixed version)		4:30
3.	"Don't Believe a Word" (BBC sessions 11 October 1976)		2:45
4.	"Johnny the Fox Meets Jimmy the Weed" (BBC sessions 11 October 1976)		3:42
5.	"Fools Gold" (BBC sessions 11 October 1976)		3:54
6.	"Johnny" (BBC sessions 11 October 1976)		4:16
7.	"Fools Gold" (instrumental run-through)		3:26
8.	"Johnny the Fox Meets Jimmy the Weed" (instrumental run-through – extended version)		5:32
9.	"Rocky" (instrumental run-through)		3:47
10.	"Massacre" (instrumental take)		2:01
11.	"Scott's Tune" (instrumental)	Gorham	1:59
Total length:			38:13

== Singles ==
- "Johnny the Fox Meets Jimmy the Weed" / "Old Flame" – 30 July 1976 (USA only)
- "Don't Believe a Word" / "Old Flame" – 26 November 1976

In the USA, the B-side was "Boogie Woogie Dance", and in Japan, "Rocky".

- "Rocky" / "Half Caste" (Australia, Canada and the USA only)
- "Rocky" / "Fools Gold" (Spain only)
- "Don't Believe A Word" / "Dancing In The Moonlight" – 7" (Reissue, 1985)

== Personnel ==
Thin Lizzy

- Phil Lynott – bass guitar, acoustic guitar, lead and backing vocals
- Scott Gorham – lead and rhythm guitar
- Brian Robertson – lead and rhythm guitar
- Brian Downey – drums, percussion

Additional musicians

- Fiachra Trench – brass and string arrangements
- Phil Collins – percussion
- Kim Beacon – backing vocals

Production

- John Alcock – producer
- Will Reid Dick – engineer
- Neil Hornby – assistant engineer
- Denis Blackham – mastering at the Master Room, London

== Charts ==
Chart (1976–77)	Peak position
Australian Albums (Kent Music Report)	93
Canada Top Albums/CDs (RPM)	52
Swedish Albums (Sverigetopplistan)	17
UK Albums (Official Charts)	11
US Billboard 200	52

Chart (2019)	Peak position
Scottish Albums (Official Charts)	97

== Certifications ==
Region	Certification	Certified units/sales
United Kingdom (BPI)	Gold	100,000^{^}
^{^} Shipments figures based on certification alone.

== See also ==
- Quality Street Gang
