= Face It Live '97 =

Live album by John Norum
- Released: 26 September 1997
- Recorded: 21 June 1997
- Venue: Club Citta, Kawasaki, Japan
- Genre: Hard rock
- Length: 73:46
- Label: Mascot (Europe); Shrapnel (USA)
- Producer: John Norum

John Norum chronology
Worlds Away (1996)	Face It Live '97 (1997)	Slipped into Tomorrow (1999)

Face It Live '97 is a live album by John Norum, the guitarist in the Swedish hard rock band Europe. It was released in 1997.

== Track listing ==
1. "Face the Truth" – 5:17 (John Norum, Glenn Hughes)
2. "Night Buzz" – 3:42 (Norum, Henrik Hildén, Michelle Meldrum)
3. "Make a Move" – 4:52 (Norum, Kelly Keeling, Alan Lorber)
4. "Good Man Shining" – 3:08 (Hughes, Norum, Mats Attaque, Micke Höglund, Thomas Broman)
5. "Wishing Well" – 4:34 (Paul Rodgers, Paul Kossoff, Simon Kirke, Tetsu Yamauchi, John Bundrick)
6. "Where the Grass is Green" – 3:53 (Norum, Keeling)
7. "Resurrection Time" – 5:08 (Norum, Keeling, Lorber)
8. "Opium Trail" – 5:21 (Brian Downey, Phil Lynott, Scott Gorham)
9. "In Your Eyes" – 4:33 (Hughes, Norum, Peter Baltes)
10. "Blind" – 3:57 (Norum, Marcel Jacob)
11. "C.Y.R." – 5:22 (Norum, Keeling, Simon Wright)
12. Guitar Solo – 3:43 (Norum)
13. "Heart of Stone" – 3:37 (Joey Tempest)
14. "From Outside In" – 6:12 (Baltes, Norum, Keeling)
15. "Let Me Love You" – 5:18 (Norum, Jacob)
16. "Scream of Anger" – 5:01 (Tempest, Jacob)

== Personnel ==
- John Norum – Guitars, vocals
- Leif Sundin – Lead vocals, guitars
- Anders Fästader – Bass, keyboards, backing vocals
- Henrik Hildén – Drums

== Album credits ==
- John Norum - Producer
