= Disarm =

1994 single by the Smashing Pumpkins

- "Heart" cover

Single by the Smashing Pumpkins

from the album Siamese Dream
- B-side: "Siamese Dream"; "Soothe"; "Blew Away"; "Landslide"; "Dancing in the Moonlight"
- Released: February 21, 1994
- Genre: Alternative rock
- Length: 3:17
- Label: Hut; Virgin
- Songwriter: Billy Corgan
- Producers: Butch Vig; Billy Corgan

The Smashing Pumpkins singles chronology
"Today" (1993)	"Disarm" (1994)	"Rocket" (1994)

Alternative cover
- "Smile" cover

Audio sample
- A 19-second clip from "Disarm": file; help

"Disarm" is a song by the American alternative rock band the Smashing Pumpkins, released as the third single from their second album, Siamese Dream (1993). It became a top-20 hit in Australia, Canada, and the UK.

== Lyrics ==
The songwriter, Billy Corgan, said the lyrics reflects the difficult relationship he had with his parents as a child.

== Release ==
"Disarm" reached number 48 on the US Hot 100 Airplay chart, number five on the Album Rock Tracks chart and number eight on the Modern Rock Tracks chart. In the UK, the BBC banned "Disarm" from Top of the Pops because of the lyric "cut that little child", and it received little radio airplay. It reached number 11 on the UK singles chart.

Two versions of the single were produced. Each version ("Heart" and "Smile") features different artwork and different B-sides. The B-sides to the "Heart" version were both covers of classic rock songs from the 1970s. "Landslide" was later included on the compilation album Pisces Iscariot, after which it received significant airplay on U.S. Modern Rock stations, peaking at number 3 on that chart. "Dancing in the Moonlight" performed well in Australia, where it charted at number 90 on the Triple J Hottest 100 in 1994, while "Disarm" did not chart.

The UK 7-inch purple vinyl single features an exclusive B-side "Siamese Dream". In 2005, the track was released as a download as part of the Rarities and B-sides compilation.

== Music video ==
The music video, directed by Jake Scott, is mainly in black and white and shows the members of the band floating over images of a house, an old man walking through an underpass while home movie-esque, color footage shows a young boy playing outside.

The video premiered on MTV in early 1994 and was immediately placed into heavy rotation and spent a month as an MTV Exclusive video. Later that year it was nominated for Best Alternative Video and Best Editing in a Video at the MTV Video Music Awards, the Pumpkins' first MTV Video Music Awards nominations.

== Track listing ==
All songs were written by Billy Corgan except where noted.

UK 7-inch vinyl single (7243 8 92309 7 0, HUT 43)

1. "Disarm" – 3:17
2. "Siamese Dream" – 2:38

UK CD single 1 ("Smile" cover)

1. "Disarm" – 3:17
2. "Soothe" (Demo) – 2:35
3. "Blew Away" (James Iha) – 3:31

UK CD single 2 ("Heart" cover)

1. "Disarm" – 3:17
2. "Landslide" (Stevie Nicks) – 3:10
3. "Dancing in the Moonlight" (Phil Lynott) – 4:21

== Charts ==
=== Weekly charts ===
Chart (1994)	Peak position
Australia (ARIA)	16
Canada Top Singles (RPM)	13
Canada Contemporary Hit Radio (The Record)	12
Europe (Eurochart Hot 100)	35
Israel (IBA)	17
New Zealand (Recorded Music NZ)	29
Quebec Airplay (ADISQ)	47
UK Singles (Official Charts)	11
US Radio Songs (Billboard)	48
US Alternative Airplay (Billboard)	8
US Mainstream Rock (Billboard)	5
US CHR Top 40 (Radio & Records)	31

=== Year-end charts ===
Chart (1994)	Position
Australia (ARIA)	88
US Album Rock Tracks (Billboard)	28
US Modern Rock Tracks (Billboard)	29

== Certifications ==
Region	Certification	Certified units/sales
New Zealand (RMNZ)	Platinum	30,000^{‡}
United Kingdom (BPI)	Silver	200,000^{‡}
^{‡} Sales+streaming figures based on certification alone.

== Release history ==
Region	Date	Format(s)	Label(s)	Ref.
United States	February 21, 1994	Radio	Virgin	
United Kingdom	February 21, 1994	7-inch vinyl; 12-inch vinyl; CD	Hut; Virgin	
Australia	February 28, 1994	CD; cassette	Hut; Virgin	
