= Worlds Away (John Norum album) =

Studio album by John Norum
- Released: 21 December 1996
- Studios: Cherokee Studios, Hollywood, California, USA
- Genre: Hard rock
- Length: 50:50
- Labels: Mascot (Europe); Shrapnel (USA); Zero Corporation (Japan); Toshiba / EMI (Japan)
- Producer: Jeff Glixman

John Norum chronology
Another Destination (1995)	Worlds Away (1996)	Face It Live '97 (1997)

Worlds Away is the fourth solo album by John Norum, the guitarist of the Swedish hard rock band Europe. It was released in 1996. This album features the only cover from John's solo releases that does not feature the guitarist himself.

== Track listing ==
1. "Manic Distortion" (John Norum, Kelly Keeling, Michelle Meldrum) – 3:18
2. "Make a Move" (J. Norum, K. Keeling, Alan Lorber) – 4:15
3. "C.Y.R." (J. Norum, K. Keeling, Simon Wright) – 4:42
4. "Where the Grass Is Green" (J. Norum, K. Keeling) – 3:46
5. "Center of Balance" (J. Norum, K. Keeling, Peter Baltes, S. Wright) – 6:56
6. "Dogs Are Barking" (J. Norum, K. Keeling, Billy White) – 3:28
7. "Homeland (Peace of Mind)" (J. Norum, K. Keeling) – 4:52
8. "Wasted Labor" (J. Norum, K. Keeling) – 5:42
9. "Worlds Away" (J. Norum, K. Keeling) – 4:38
10. "Endica (Revisited)" (J. Norum, P. Baltes, K. Keeling) – 3:58
11. "From Outside In" (P. Baltes, J. Norum, K. Keeling) – 5:09 [Japanese bonus]

== Personnel ==
- John Norum – lead and rhythm guitars, vocals
- Kelly Keeling – vocals, keyboards
- Peter Baltes – bass guitar
- Simon Wright – drums

== Album credits ==
- Jeff Glixman - producer, engineer
