= Jailbreak (album) =

- Cover art by Jim Fitzpatrick

Studio album by Thin Lizzy
- Released: 26 March 1976
- Recorded: December 1975 – February 1976
- Studio: Ramport (London)
- Genres: Hard rock; blues rock
- Length: 35:52
- Label: Vertigo (UK): Mercury (US)
- Producer: John Alcock

Thin Lizzy chronology
Fighting (1975)	Jailbreak (1976)	Johnny the Fox (1976)

Jailbreak is the sixth studio album by Irish hard rock band Thin Lizzy. It was released on 26 March 1976, by Vertigo Records in the UK, and Mercury Records in the US. The album proved to be the band's commercial breakthrough in the US, and the only Thin Lizzy album with a certification (in this case, Gold) in that country. The singles taken from the album include "Jailbreak" and "The Boys Are Back in Town"; the latter is Thin Lizzy's biggest US hit, and won the 1976 NME Award for Best Single.

== Composition and recording ==
After their previous two albums, Nightlife and Fighting, failed to generate sales, Thin Lizzy were given one last chance by their label, Vertigo Records. The band wrote songs and collected ideas in a studio in Buckinghamshire in late 1975, then convened at Ramport Studios in London in the new year. They selected John Alcock as their producer, for he had worked in the studio extensively. The band worked diligently through February on the album. However, guitarists Scott Gorham and Brian Robertson felt that the speed at which it was completed adversely affected its quality. Both stated that the tightness of the songs made the album feel rigid. In particular, Robertson said he would have liked more freedom to improvise his lead guitar parts. Gorham also criticized Alcock's production, saying that he did not particularly care for his guitar tone on the album.

"When I wrote 'Warriors'…" frontman and songwriter Phil Lynott remarked in 1976, "the only way I could give any sense of heavy drug takers was by describing them as warriors; that they actually go out and do it. People like Hendrix and Duane Allman were perfectly aware of the position they were getting into. They weren't slowly being hooked. It was a conscious decision to go out and take the thing as far as it can go."

Initially, the song "Running Back" was chosen to be a single ahead of "The Boys Are Back in Town", the latter being seen as possibly too aggressive for some radio stations to play. Lynott and producer John Alcock decided to employ session musicians to add more commercial elements to some of the tracks and try to produce a hit single, so Tim Hinkley was brought in to add keyboard parts to "Running Back". Robertson was against the idea, as he liked the song as it had originally been arranged, in a blues format with his own additions of piano and bottleneck guitar. He later said, "I took enormous offence to [the changes]. I couldn't understand why they'd pay this guy a fortune just for playing what he did. Listen to it and tell me it's not bollocks." Robertson did not play on the finished version of the song and Hinkley is not credited on the album sleeve. Lynott said at the time that "Running Back" was "very much influenced by Van Morrison. I really like that song." Hinkley later recalled, "Robbo and Scott were not keen on it at all but they were overruled." Thirty-five years later, Robertson recorded his own versions of the song on his 2011 album Diamonds and Dirt.

Scott Gorham also revealed that "Romeo and the Lonely Girl" was also brought up as an option for a single, but was ultimately discarded, as "nobody was overexcited about it."

== Tour ==
While touring to promote the album, in the US, Lynott was stricken with hepatitis. Finally, the tour management decided to cancel the remaining tour dates allowing him time to recuperate.

== Reception ==
Professional ratings
Review scores
Source	Rating
AllMusic	5/5 stars
Christgau's Record Guide	B−
Classic Rock	8/10
Collector's Guide to Heavy Metal	9/10
Pitchfork	9.1/10

Village Voice critic Robert Christgau likened the album's songs to Bruce Springsteen cast-offs, finding Lynott's lyrical ideas "boring" and Gorham's guitar lines "second-hand". Stuart Bailie of Classic Rock magazine referred back to Christgau's appraisal, writing that both Springsteen and Lynott "were indebted to Van Morrison and his Celtic soul", and remarked how on Jailbreak "Lynott's best attributes were coming on strong."

In a retrospective assessment for AllMusic, Stephen Thomas Erlewine describes Jailbreak as a "truly exceptional album", with "a dimension of richness that sustains, but there's such kinetic energy to the band that it still sounds immediate no matter how many times it's played". Highlighting Lynott's songs as "lovingly florid... crammed with specifics and overflowing with life", he says that Gorham and Robertson's guitar work is "intertwined, dual-lead guitar interplay that was one of the most distinctive sounds of '70s rock". In his review Martin Popoff described Jailbreak as "the band's last album where eclecticism outweighs the cohesive signals" which made later releases "much more singular in intent". He praised "Gorham and Robertson's sharpest metal to date" and remarked how the album is made of "a coterie of songs that very often struck the same emotional heartstrings of Springsteen."

== Track listings ==
All tracks written or co-written by Phil Lynott; additional writers noted.

Side one
No.	Title	Writer(s)	Length
1.	"Jailbreak"		4:01
2.	"Angel from the Coast"	Brian Robertson	3:03
3.	"Running Back"		3:13
4.	"Romeo and the Lonely Girl"		3:55
5.	"Warriors"	Scott Gorham	4:09

Side two
No.	Title	Writer(s)	Length
6.	"The Boys Are Back in Town"		5.00
7.	"Fight or Fall"		3:45
8.	"Cowboy Song"	Brian Downey	5:16
9.	"Emerald"	Gorham, Robertson, Downey	4:03

On the 1996 Mercury CD reissue, "Angel from the Coast" and "Running Back" are listed as the second track with only one running time, making it appear to be a single song called "Angel from the Coast Running Back", and there is no third track listed. However, all the songs are sequenced as on the original LP release.

=== Remastered edition ===
On 24 January 2011, a new remastered and expanded version of Jailbreak was released. This new edition is a 2-CD set, with the original album on disc one, and bonus material on disc two. On the original vinyl release of the album, the back cover included a short story, which is also reprinted inside some editions of the new deluxe edition.

However, the track listing on the back cover of the first release was incorrect, listing only ten songs, while the actual CD contains eleven tracks. Also, the songs are not in the correct order. The track listing was corrected on later versions of the release.

Only the bonus material on disc two has been remastered in 2010 (despite what it says on the back of the CD booklet). Disc one uses the same remaster as the 1996 edition. New remasters were made, but scrapped at the last minute before the release, for reasons unknown.

Disc two
No.	Title	Writer(s)	Length
1.	"The Boys Are Back in Town" (remixed version)		4:34
2.	"Jailbreak" (remixed version)		4:13
3.	"The Boys Are Back in Town" (alternate vocal - remixed version)		4:32
4.	"Emerald" (remixed version)		4:08
5.	"Jailbreak" (BBC Session, 12 February 1976)		4:04
6.	"Emerald" (BBC Session, 12 February 1976)		3:57
7.	"Cowboy Song" (BBC Session, 12 February 1976)		5:13
8.	"Warriors" (BBC Session, 12 February 1976)		3:56
9.	"Fight or Fall" (extended version – rough mix)		5:21
10.	"Blues Boy" (previously unreleased studio track)	Lynott	4:38
11.	"Derby Blues" (early live version of "Cowboy Song" recorded 11 February 1975)	Lynott, Downey	6:51
Total length:			51:27

For "Record Store Day" in April 2025, Jailbreak: Alternative Versions was released on vinyl with demos, alternate takes and instrumentals from the original sessions on one LP.

== Singles ==
- "The Boys are Back in Town" / "Emerald" – 17 April 1976

Some countries, including the US and Canada, featured "Jailbreak" as the B-side.

- "Jailbreak" / "Running Back" – 30 July 1976
- "Cowboy Song" / "Angel from the Coast" (Canada and US only)

== Personnel ==
Thin Lizzy

- Phil Lynott – bass guitar, acoustic guitar, vocals
- Scott Gorham – lead and rhythm guitar
- Brian Robertson – lead and rhythm guitar
- Brian Downey – drums, percussion

Additional musicians

- Tim Hinkley – keyboards on "Running Back" (uncredited)

Production

- John Alcock – producer
- Will Reid Dick – engineer
- Neil Hornby – assistant engineer

== Charts ==
=== Weekly charts ===
Chart (1976–77)	Peak position
Australian Albums (Kent Music Report)	51
Canada Top Albums/CDs (RPM)	5
Swedish Albums (Sverigetopplistan)	21
UK Albums (Official Charts)	10
US Billboard 200	18

Chart (2019)	Peak position
Scottish Albums (Official Charts)	70

=== Year-end charts ===
Chart (1976)	Position
Canada Top Albums/CDs (RPM)	43
UK Albums (OCC)	36
US Billboard 200	77

== Certifications ==
Region	Certification	Certified units/sales
Canada (Music Canada)	Gold	50,000^{^}
United Kingdom (BPI)	Gold	100,000^{^}
United States (RIAA)	Gold	500,000^{^}
^{^} Shipments figures based on certification alone.
