= Bad Reputation (Thin Lizzy song) =

Song by Thin Lizzy

from the album Bad Reputation
- A-side: "Dancing in the Moonlight (It's Caught Me in Its Spotlight)"
- Released: 29 July 1977
- Recorded: May – June 1977
- Genre: Hard rock, blues rock
- Length: 3:09
- Label: Vertigo; Mercury (US only)
- Songwriters: Brian Downey; Scott Gorham; Phil Lynott
- Producers: Thin Lizzy; Tony Visconti

"Bad Reputation" is a song by the Irish rock band Thin Lizzy. The song was released as the B-side to the song "Dancing in the Moonlight (It's Caught Me in Its Spotlight)" and was later also released on the album Bad Reputation.

== Covers ==
American all-girl heavy metal band Phantom Blue covered "Bad Reputation" on their 1993 album Built to Perform.

24-7 Spyz also covered the song on their album Face the Day (2006).

Foo Fighters covered the song and released it on their covers album, Medium Rare (2011).

In 2015 English speed metal band Raven covered "Bad Reputation" on their album of covers titled Party Killers. This album was only made available to backers of Raven's kickstarter for their album ExtermiNation, released in April 2015.

== In popular culture ==
A cover version of the song is a playable song in the 2006 music video game Guitar Hero II, and the Thin Lizzy version was featured in the soundtrack of the 2001 documentary movie Dogtown and Z-Boys.

In the 2012 video game Sleeping Dogs it was featured on the in-game radio station Sagittarius FM.
