= Brian Robertson (guitarist) =

Scottish guitarist (born 1956)

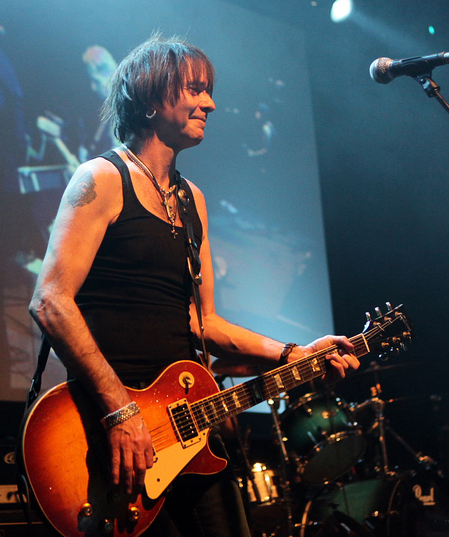
- Robertson performing in 2011

Background information
- Also known as: "Robbo"
- Born: 12 February 1956 (age 70); Clarkston, Renfrewshire, Scotland
- Genres: Hard rock, blues rock, heavy metal, rock and roll
- Occupation: Musician
- Instrument: Guitar
- Years active: 1974–present

Brian David Robertson (born 12 February 1956) is a Scottish rock guitarist, best known as a former member of Thin Lizzy from 1974 to 1978, and Motörhead from 1982 to 1983, replacing Fast Eddie Clarke.

== Early life ==
Robertson was born in Clarkston, Renfrewshire (now part of East Renfrewshire), where he was educated, attending Eastwood High School in nearby Newton Mearns, and became a musician. He studied cello and classical piano for eight years before switching to the guitar and drums. He played in gigs around his local area with bands like Dream Police, who later evolved into the Average White Band.

== Career ==
=== Thin Lizzy ===
In June 1974, Thin Lizzy were auditioning for two new guitarists, and a try-out for Robertson was arranged. Aged 18, Robertson was taken on, along with Scott Gorham, on the other lead guitar. He was given the nickname "Robbo" by Phil Lynott to distinguish him from drummer Brian Downey. The two lead guitarists provided a critical part of Thin Lizzy's signature sound, which critics called their "twin guitar attack". During his time in the band, Robertson was a contributing member to five studio albums released by Thin Lizzy: Nightlife (1974), Fighting (1975), Jailbreak (1976), Johnny the Fox (1976), Bad Reputation (1977) and a live album Live and Dangerous (1978).

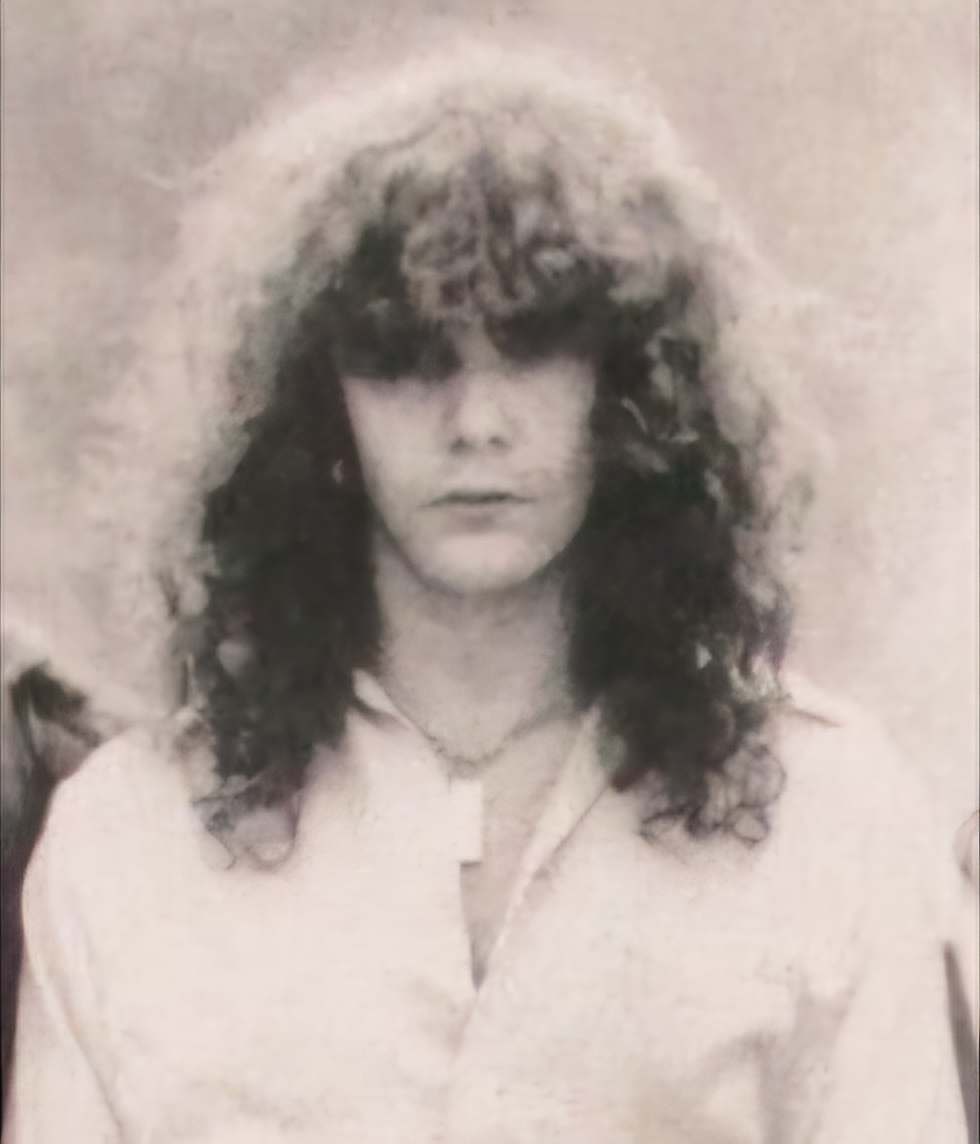
Brian Robertson in 1977

Although frontman and bassist/lead vocalist Phil Lynott was the primary songwriter for Thin Lizzy's material, Robertson contributed a substantial share of the band's songwriting, sometimes collaborating with Lynott and the band. Nightlife and Bad Reputation were the only records that did not feature his songwriting, and he performed only on selected tracks from the latter album.

In Thin Lizzy, the unusual twin harmony lead guitar sound, instigated by Robertson and Gorham, contributed much to the distinctive sound of the band and influenced subsequent bands such as Iron Maiden, Metallica, The Darkness, and Velvet Revolver. Robertson's pioneering, unconventional use of the wah-wah pedal as an extension of the instrument during soloing, rather than as a purely rhythmic effect, also provided a boost to the band.

Robertson struggled to deal with Lizzy's newfound fame after the release of the hit single "The Boys Are Back in Town" and the accompanying Jailbreak LP. He began drinking heavily towards the end of 1976. A further tour of the US was planned for December 1976, but it had to be cancelled when, on 23 November, Brian Robertson suffered a hand injury when trying to protect fellow Glaswegian, singer and friend Frankie Miller in a fracas at the Speakeasy Club in London. Miller had been jamming onstage with the reggae band Gonzalez, but had been drunk, offending Gonzalez guitarist Gordon Hunte. Hunte attacked Miller with a bottle in the dressing room, and Robertson intervened, suffering artery and nerve damage to his hand. Robertson subsequently broke Hunte's leg, broke the collarbone of another man, and headbutted another, before being hit on the head with a bottle, rendering him unconscious.

Robertson maintains that, contrary to reports at the time, he was not drunk and had only gone to the venue for a meal. Lynott was angry and replaced Robertson with Gary Moore for another tour of the States in January–March 1977, this time supporting Queen.

While Robertson recuperated from his injury, Lizzy flew to Toronto in May 1977 to record the Bad Reputation album with American producer Tony Visconti, with Gorham ostensibly taking all of the guitar parts. However, at Gorham's insistence, Lynott allowed Robertson to rejoin the band that June as a guest in Toronto. Gorham had left the songs "Opium Trail" and "Killer Without a Cause" without solos so that Robertson could contribute; the two also played lead together on one song, "That Woman's Gonna Break Your Heart." Robertson was fully reinstated for the remainder of 1977 and into 1978, during which the majority of the tapes for the band's well-known double LP Live and Dangerous were recorded. In July 1978, Robertson finally left the band for good, due mainly to his irreconcilable differences with Lynott, and was again replaced by Gary Moore, this time on an official basis.

=== Wild Horses and Thin Lizzy farewell tour ===
Robertson had formed Wild Horses along with another Scot, Rainbow bassist Jimmy Bain in 1977, while recovering from his injury. After his final exit from Thin Lizzy in 1978, he returned to the band. Achieving only partial success in the UK, the band split up after releasing two albums, Wild Horses (1980) and Stand Your Ground (1981).

In 1980 Robertson was also featured on the Eric Burdon album Darkness Darkness. Robertson appeared for one performance of Thin Lizzy's final tour in 1983, alongside other former guitarists. He was featured on the recording of the tour, Life, appearing on the songs "Emerald" and "The Rocker." In 1986 he recorded a cover of "Still in Love with You" as a tribute to Phil Lynott, appearing alongside Bobby Tench.

=== Motörhead ===
In May 1982, Robertson replaced "Fast" Eddie Clarke as the lead guitarist of Motörhead, after Clarke walked out of the band midway through their Iron Fist tour. "That felt totally uncertain," Robertson later told Classic Rock. "It only came about because I was helping out some friends and, when they asked me to join officially, I said, 'Okay, but I'm not fucking rewriting the Ace of Spades.'" Following the completion of the tour, Robertson co-wrote and played on the band's sixth studio album, Another Perfect Day, which would prove to be his only studio album with the group. Robertson's resistance to playing "classic" Motörhead songs live, along with a playing style and a fashion sense (he often sported a headband and leg warmers) that did not fit well with Motörhead's aggressive music and look, resulted in his departure from the band just 18 months after he had joined. His last appearance with them was at the Metropol in Berlin, on 11 November 1983.

Despite his short-lived tenure, Robertson would feature on three officially released live albums recorded during this time — King Biscuit Flower Hour Presents Motörhead, a partial recording of the band's show at L'Amour in New York City on 10 August 1983, Live 1983, recorded in Sheffield on 9 June, and Live at Manchester Apollo, recorded the day after the Sheffield show. The latter two concerts were originally recorded as a source of B-sides for Another Perfect Day singles, but when Castle later bought Motörhead's complete back catalogue from Bronze Records they were released in full through the band's fan club in the early 1990s.

=== Later work ===
After leaving Motörhead, Robertson briefly joined Gary Barden's band Statetrooper. Soon after this, he joined long time friend (and fellow Scotsman) Frankie Miller and his band, which also consisted of Simon Kirke (formerly of Free and Bad Company) on drums and Chrissie Stewart on bass. He played guitar on the album Dancing in the Rain that was released in 1985.

In 1992 Robertson made a guest appearance with Skyclad at the Dynamo Open Air Festival, in Eindhoven, Netherlands. In 2004 he also made a guest appearance with Ash at the Oxegen festival in Ireland, playing guitar on their version of Thin Lizzy's "The Boys Are Back in Town".

He was reunited with Lizzy bandmates a final time in August 2005 for a tribute show in memory of Phil Lynott, in a line-up fronted by Gary Moore. Robertson and Moore appeared with Brian Downey, Scott Gorham, Eric Bell and Jethro Tull bassist Jonathan Noyce. This concert and an extended interview with Robertson were released on the DVD One Night in Dublin: A Tribute to Phil Lynott.

During February 2008 Robertson returned to the studio to work on new material. He also made a guest appearance on The Bitter Twins debut album Global Panic!, which was released in 2009.

His first solo album Diamonds and Dirt, featuring Ian Haugland of Europe, Nalle Pahlsson from Treat, Leif Sundin from MSG and Liny Wood, was recorded in Stockholm at Polar Studios over a two-year period. It was produced by Robertson, Soren Lindberg and Chris Laney. The album features thirteen songs, written by Robertson and others including Phil Lynott, Frankie Miller and Jim White. It was released in Europe through Steamhammer Records in March 2011.

== Personal life ==
Robertson has one son with Karen Rix. They were introduced by Tommy Crossin of Rix's management team, who also worked for Lemmy and Motörhead, in 1985 at Donington festival and later started dating. They lived together at The Barbican. Their son Logan Robertson was born in London 4 April 1991. Robertson lives in Essex, England when he is not on tour or recording in Scandinavia, where he spends a lot of his working time.

== Influences ==
Like many British rock guitarists, Robertson was significantly influenced by earlier blues guitarists. Robertson's influences include Freddie King, Jeff Beck, Eric Clapton and Peter Green. ZZ Top's Billy Gibbons is also mentioned as a later influence.

== Equipment ==
=== Guitars ===
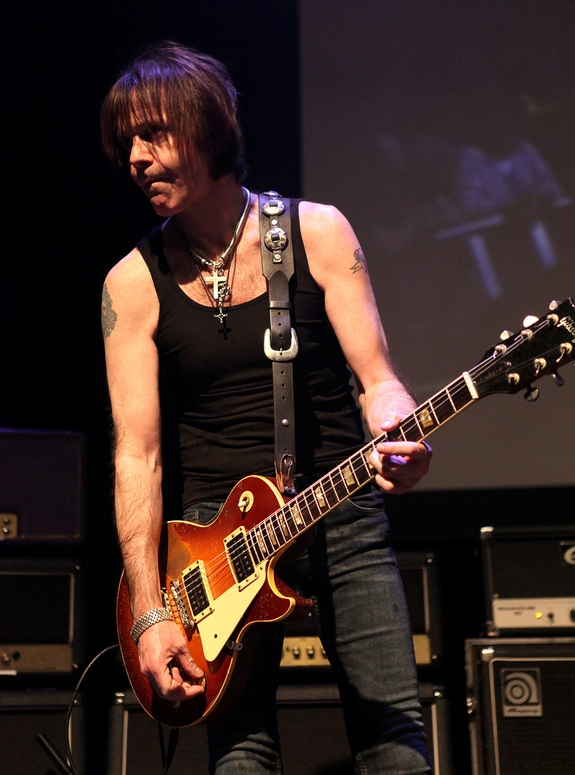
Robertson playing at an annual tribute concert for Lynott; the 25th annual "Vibe for Philo"

Robertson is often associated with a Black 1960 Les Paul Custom, with a white/parchment pick guard, featured in photographs on the Live and Dangerous album and the subsequent video. However, in an interview Robertson explained that his main guitar remains his original Thin Lizzy Sunburst 1973 Les Paul Deluxe, albeit re-fretted due to wear and with 1959 vintage Gibson Seth Lover PAF humbucker pick-ups fitted by his guitar technician. The pick-ups are without the normal German-silver pick-up covers, a popular modification.

Robertson acquired his Deluxe in 1974, just after joining Thin Lizzy. It was his main guitar on all of the Lizzy studio albums. In the autumn of 1977, when he had the pick-ups on the Deluxe changed, he began using the Custom (photographs taken at the Tower Theater in Upper Darby, Pennsylvania, from October of that year are among the earliest-known images of Robertson using the guitar). This became his main guitar from then until the early 1980s, when he switched back to the Deluxe (he can be seen with it in some footage with Motorhead). It has been his main guitar ever since. Robertson can also be seen playing a white Fender Stratocaster with black pick-guard and a black Gibson SG in mimed footage with Lizzy. Indeed Brian was playing (or miming) the song "Rosalie" on a black 3-pick-up (black-white-black pick-ups sans covers) Gibson SG (possibly a "Custom", judging by the distinctive double-diamond head-stock inlay) on the popular BBC show Top Of the Pops (TOTP) in 1978.

Robertson was also filmed playing a Mid 70's Travis Bean TB1000A. The distinctive straight-sided T-cutout in the carved headstock of the solid Reynolds 6061 aluminium alloy core that includes, headstock, neck and continues behind a thin layer of Koa wood behind bridge, which is secured directly into the ally, on Dedication and Don't Believe A Word.

Although associated with Marshall amplifiers (100 watt non-Master Volume Superlead heads and 25 W Celestion Greenback speakers), Robertson has been known to use Mesa Boogie (100 W Dual Rectifier head) and Soundman amplifiers. The Jailbreak album was recorded using a Carlsbro combo. Robertson's original wah-pedal is a UK made Colorsound although he sometimes used a Cry Baby wah wah in the 1990s and a borrowed Vox Wah in the "Still in Love with Blues" video (which the host, Stuart Bull, cut the rubber feet off of, much to the dismay of Brian).

Robertson's use of the WEM Copicat tape echo unit was later replaced by a modern rack mounted digital delay unit. He used a Black Les Paul custom and mentions he experimented with "Boss Analog Chorus Delay, an MXR Pitch Transposer, Yamaha analogue delays, and MXR 32 band Graphic EQ" during his Motörhead days.

Record producer Tony Visconti mentioned that for "Killer Without A Cause," featured on the Bad Reputation album:

... Robertson plays guitar through the strange talk box, the simple gizmo that Peter Frampton made famous on his successful live album."

On his VHS video "Still in Love with the Blues" Robertson is pictured with a vintage red Les Paul guitar, unusually equipped with soap-bar pick-ups and a trapeze bridge, although it does not feature on the video itself. It did however feature on TOTPs in Thin Lizzy's 1976 appearance for the song "The Boys are Back in Town". Robertson's Facebook page features more information on this instrument: purchased by Thin Lizzy's manager in 1973, the guitar has an unusually lightweight body as it was built by Les Paul himself for his then-wife, guitarist Mary Ford.

A detailed gear diagram of Robertson's 1974 Thin Lizzy guitar rig is documented.

== Discography ==
=== Solo ===
- Diamonds and Dirt (2011)

=== With Thin Lizzy ===
- Nightlife (1974)
- Fighting (1975)
- Jailbreak (1976)
- Johnny the Fox (1976)
- Bad Reputation (1977)
- Live and Dangerous (1978)
- Life (1983) (2 tracks)

=== With Wild Horses ===
- Wild Horses (1980)
- Stand Your Ground (1981)

=== With Motörhead ===
- Another Perfect Day (1983)
- Live 83 – Sheffield 9 June 1983 (1983)
- Live at Manchester 10 June 1983 (1983)
- The Birthday Party (1985)

=== Other albums ===
- Pat Travers – Makin' Magic (1977)
- Peter French – Ducks in Flight (1978)
- Steve Ellis – Last Angry Man (1978/2001)
- Roy Sundholm – The Chinese Method (1979)
- Philip Lynott – Solo in Soho (1980)
- Zaine Griff – Ashes and Diamonds (1980)
- Eric Burdon – Darkness Darkness (1980)
- Frankie Miller – Dancing in the Rain (1986)
- Balaam and the Angel – Live Free or Die (1988)
- Mona Liza Overdrive – Vive La Ka Bum (1989)
- Skyclad – Tracks from the Wilderness EP (1992)
- Shane MacGowan and The Popes – The Snake (1994)
- The Clan – That's All... EP (1995)
- Shane MacGowan and The Popes – Christmas Party EP (1996)
- Various Artists – Thousand Days of Yesterdays – A Tribute to Captain Beyond (1999)
- Lotus – A Taster for the Big One (1999)
- Five Fifteen – Silver Machine (2000)
- Lotus – Quartet Conspiracy (2000)
- Dogface – Unleashed (2001)
- Meldrum – Loaded Mental Cannon (2001)
- Five Fifteen – The Man Who Sold Himself (2004)
- The Bitter Twins – Global Panic! (2009)

==== Interviews on DVDs ====
- Gary Moore and Friends: One Night in Dublin – A Tribute to Phil Lynott (2005)
- Motorhead Videobiography – double DVD (2007)
- Motorhead Overkill – double DVD (2008)
- "Thin Lizzy Live and Dangerous" – DVD (2007)

==== Interviews on VHS video ====
- Still in Love with the Blues a JamTrax guitar tuition video/masterclass featuring Robertson with Stuart Bull. The title is a play on Robertson's signature Thin Lizzy track, "Still in Love with You". The video is also available on YouTube.
