= Nightlife (Thin Lizzy album) =

- Cover art by Jim Fitzpatrick

Studio album by Thin Lizzy
- Released: 8 November 1974
- Recorded: April and September 1974
- Studios: Saturn, Worthing; Trident and Olympic, London
- Genres: Hard rock; blues rock; soft rock
- Length: 37:11
- Label: Vertigo
- Producers: Ron Nevison, Phil Lynott

Thin Lizzy chronology
Vagabonds of the Western World (1973)	Nightlife (1974)	Fighting (1975)

Singles from Nightlife
- 1. "Philomena" Released: 25 October 1974; 2. "Showdown" Released: January 1975 (US); 3. "It's Only Money" Released: January 1975 (Ger.)

Nightlife is the fourth studio album by Irish rock band Thin Lizzy, released on 8 November 1974 by Vertigo Records. It was produced by Ron Nevison and bandleader Phil Lynott, and was the first album to feature the band as a quartet with newcomers Scott Gorham and Brian Robertson on guitars.

Some reissue CDs, and occasionally other sources, spell the album title as Night Life, the same as the song title. However the original album title is Nightlife.

The song "Philomena" was written for Lynott's mother.

== Album artwork ==
The album cover, designed by Jim Fitzpatrick, shows a panther-like creature in a city scene. The panther is often thought to be intended to represent Lynott, but Fitzpatrick has confirmed that the panther referred to the Black Panthers and African-American political figures like Malcolm X and Martin Luther King Jr.

== Reception ==
Professional ratings
Review scores
Source	Rating
AllMusic	3.5/5 stars
Collector's Guide to Heavy Metal	7/10

Stephen Thomas Erlewine of AllMusic described Nightlife as an "underrated gem of a record", but a "complete anomaly within their catalog"... "a subdued, soulful record, smooth in ways that Thin Lizzy never were before and rarely were afterwards". He singles out "She Knows" as "gently propulsive, [and] utterly addictive", but adds that there are "still moments of tough, primal rock 'n' roll", such as "It's Only Money" and "Sha-La-La". Martin Popoff judged the album "more enigmatic, sincere and philosophically complex than much else rock 'n' roll out there at the time", but also "too distant from the band's heart and soul" and overtly into black music, with Lynott "searching for ways to pay homage to his racial heritage."

== Cover versions ==
- American metal band Slough Feg covered "Sha-La-La" on a 2006 split with Bible of the Devil, and again on their 2011 live album Made in Poland.
- Concrete Blonde covered "It's Only Money" on their 1989 album Free.
- "It's Only Money" was re-recorded 35 years later by Robertson on his 2011 solo album Diamonds and Dirt.
- The Obsessed covered "It's Only Money" on their 2017 album Sacred.
- John Norum covered "It's Only Money" on his 2010 album Play Yard Blues.
- Sade covered “Still In Love with You” as a new track on her 2011 collection The Ultimate Collection.

== Track listings ==
All tracks are written by Phil Lynott, except where noted.

Side one
No.	Title	Writer(s)	Length
1.	"She Knows"	Scott Gorham, Lynott	5:13
2.	"Night Life"		3:57
3.	"It's Only Money"		2:47
4.	"Still in Love with You"		5:40
5.	"Frankie Carroll"		2:02

Side two
No.	Title	Writer(s)	Length
6.	"Showdown"		4:32
7.	"Banshee"		1:27
8.	"Philomena"		3:41
9.	"Sha-La-La"	Brian Downey, Lynott	3:27
10.	"Dear Heart"		4:35

The song "Night Life" borrows the title and chorus of Willie Nelson's 1960 song "Night Life", but Nelson is not credited on the album.

On the cassette version, the positions of "She Knows" and "Showdown" were reversed.

=== Remastered edition ===
A remastered 2-CD set deluxe edition of Nightlife was released on 12 March 2012.

Disc two
No.	Title	Length
1.	"She Knows" (BBC Session, 3 October 1974)	5:10
2.	"Sha-La-La" (BBC Session, 3 October 1974)	3:38
3.	"It's Only Money" (BBC Session, 3 October 1974)	2:44
4.	"Philomena" (BBC Session, 3 October 1974)	3:43
5.	"Dear Heart" (BBC Session, 23 October 1974)	4:28
6.	"Banshee" (BBC Session, 23 October 1974)	2:43
7.	"Showdown" (demo with Gary Moore)	3:53
8.	"Still in Love with You" (demo with Gary Moore)	6:27
9.	"It's Only Money" (demo with Gary Moore)	2:55
10.	"Showdown" (alternate take)	4:37
11.	"Still in Love with You" (rough vocal mix)	6:02
Total length:		46:20

== Singles ==
- Philomena/Sha-La-La – 7" (1974)
- It's Only Money/Night Life – 7" (1974)
- Showdown/Night Life – 7" (1974)

== Personnel ==
Thin Lizzy

- Phil Lynott – bass guitar, lead vocals, acoustic guitar
- Scott Gorham – guitars, backing vocals
- Brian Robertson – guitars
- Brian Downey – drums, percussion

Additional musicians

- Frankie Miller – co-lead vocals on "Still in Love with You"
- Gary Moore – lead guitar on "Still in Love with You" & tracks 7–9 on disc 2
- Jean Alain Roussel – Hammond B3, piano on tracks 1, 4, 5 and 10
- Jimmy Horowitz – orchestral arrangements on tracks 1, 5 and 10

Production

- Ron Nevison – producer, engineer, mixing
- Ted Sharp – engineer
- Arnie Acosta – mastering at The Mastering Lab, Los Angeles

== Charts ==
Chart (2012)	Peak position
UK Rock & Metal Albums (Official Charts)	19

Chart (2025)	Peak position
German Albums (Offizielle Top 100)	33
German Rock & Metal Albums (Offizielle Top 100)	5
Swiss Albums (Schweizer Hitparade)	62
