= Total Control (John Norum album) =

Studio album by John Norum
- Released: 29 October 1987
- Recorded: Stockholm Recording Studios; mastered at Polar Studios, Stockholm
- Genre: Hard rock
- Length: 40:55
- Label: CBS, Epic
- Producer: John Norum, Thomas Witt, Per Blom

John Norum chronology
Total Control (1987)	Live in Stockholm (1990)

Singles from Total Control
- 1. "Let Me Love You" Released: 1987; 2. "Love Is Meant to Last Forever" Released: 1987; 3. "Back on the Streets" Released: 1988

Professional ratings
Review scores
Source	Rating
Kerrang!	4/5 stars
Rock Hard	8/10 stars

Total Control is the first solo album by Europe guitarist John Norum. It was released after Norum left Europe following the release of 1986's The Final Countdown and the tour that followed.

== Track listing ==
All songs were written by John Norum and Marcel Jacob, except where noted.

1. "Let Me Love You" – 3:23
2. "Love Is Meant to Last Forever" – 3:40
3. "Too Many Hearts" – 3:12
4. "Someone Else Here" – 4:13 (Norum, Jacob, Peter Hermansson)
5. "Eternal Flame" – 3:14
6. "Back on the Streets" – 4:11 (Vinnie Vincent, Richard Friedman)
7. "Blind" – 3:53
8. "Law of Life" – 4:22 (Max Lorentz, Mats Lindfors)
9. "We'll Do What It Takes Together" – 3:25
10. "In Chase of the Wind" – 3:02
11. "Wild One" (bonus track) – 4:20 (Phil Lynott)

== Personnel ==
Credits adapted from AllMusic.

- John Norum – guitars, lead and backing vocals
- Marcel Jacob – bass
- Göran Edman – lead vocals on "Love Is Meant to Last Forever", "Eternal Flame" and "Back on the Streets", backing vocals

Guest musicians

- Per Blom – keyboards
- Peter Hermansson – drums
- Micke Larsson – fretless bass on "Too Many Hearts"
- Mats Lindfors – backing vocals on "Law of Life"
- Max Lorentz – Hammond organ on "Law of Life"

Production

- John Norum – producer
- Thomas Witt – producer
- Per Blom – co-producer, engineer, mixing
- Mats Lindfors – engineer, Mixing
- Peter Dahl – mastering

== Charts ==
=== Album ===
Year	Chart	Position
1988	SWE	4

=== Singles ===
Year	Single	Chart	Position
1987	"Let Me Love You"	SWE	4
1988	"Back on the Streets"	Mainstream Rock	34
