= Dancing in the Moonlight (It's Caught Me in Its Spotlight) =

Single by Thin Lizzy

from the album Bad Reputation
- B-side: "Bad Reputation"
- Released: 29 July 1977
- Recorded: May – June 1977
- Genre: Hard rock; blues rock
- Length: 3:26
- Label: Vertigo; Mercury (US only)
- Songwriter: Phil Lynott
- Producers: Thin Lizzy, Tony Visconti

Thin Lizzy singles chronology
"Don't Believe a Word" (1976)	"Dancing in the Moonlight (It's Caught Me in Its Spotlight)" (1977)	"Rosalie/Cowgirl's Song (Medley)" (1978)

"Dancing in the Moonlight (It's Caught Me in Its Spotlight)" is a song by the Irish rock band Thin Lizzy. It appears on their 1977 album Bad Reputation and was also released as a single on 29 July 1977—a few months before the album. The song reached No. 14 in the UK Singles Chart in September 1977, and No. 84 in Canada.

The song chord progression is based around Em D C G , and builds on the introductory bass riff played by Phil Lynott, adding the vocal melody line sung by Lynott which contrasts and synergizes with the saxophone melodic counterpoint played by Supertramp's John Helliwell.

== Critical reception ==
Upon its release, Jim Evans of Record Mirror called it "pure Lizzy" with "nice sax backing", "clear Lynott vocals" and an "excellent wailing guitar break". He concluded that it "should be a hit". Ian Birch, writing for Melody Maker, noted that the "depth charge bass line welds his Phil Lynott song together, while John Helliwell overlays some effectively restrained sax."

== Covers ==
The Smashing Pumpkins covered the song for various live performances, turning the originally upbeat, overlaid melody of the original into a slow paced acoustic tune; it was recorded as B-side of the single "Disarm". British indie pop singer-songwriter Diana Vickers covered the song as the first of several covers used as teasers leading up to the release of her second studio album.

In 2012 the English indie rock band Alt-J released a mash up of "Dancing in the Moonlight" for the compilation album, The Saturday Sessions from The Dermot O'Leary Show. Later it was recorded at Spotify Studios NYC and released as part of their Spotify Singles project in 2017.

In 2017 British singer Josh Dally released a reworked acoustic ballad version of the song.

The American band Cannons released a dream pop-inspired cover in November 2023 as the final track on their Heartbeat Highway album.

== In commercials ==
In 2005, this song was used as part of an advertising campaign to launch Magners Irish Cider in the UK.

== Charts ==
Chart (1977)	Peak position
Australian Singles (Kent Music Report)	59
Canada Top Singles (RPM)	84
Ireland (IRMA)	4
UK Singles (Official Charts)	14

== Certifications ==
Region	Certification	Certified units/sales
New Zealand (RMNZ)	Gold	15,000^{‡}
^{‡} Sales+streaming figures based on certification alone.
