= Slipped into Tomorrow =

Studio album by John Norum
- Released: 26 November 1999
- Studio: First Take Studio & Studio Subsonic, Stockholm, Sweden
- Genre: Hard rock
- Length: 52:12
- Label: Mascot (Europe); Shrapnel (US); Toshiba/EMI (Japan)
- Producer: John Norum

John Norum chronology
Face It Live '97 (1997)	Slipped into Tomorrow (1999)	Optimus (2005)

Slipped into Tomorrow is the fifth solo album by John Norum, the guitarist for Swedish hard rock band Europe, released in 1999.

The album features a cover version of the Thin Lizzy song "Killer Without a Cause".

Professional ratings
Review scores
Source	Rating
Allmusic	link

== Track listing ==
1. "Still in the Game" (John Norum, Billy White) - 3:49
2. "Waiting on You" (Norum) - 3:32
3. "Blackscape" (Norum, Fredrik Åkesson) - 5:14
4. "Tico's Life" (Norum) - 4:58
5. "Nobody Answers" (Norum) - 4:53
6. "Losing My Mind" (Norum) - 6:12
7. "Freedom Is My Truth" (Norum) - 4:19
8. "Veda" (Norum, Michelle Meldrum) - 4:42
9. "Songs of Yesterday" (Norum, Meldrum) - 4:44
10. "Killer Without a Cause" (Scott Gorham, Phil Lynott) - 4:06
11. "Center of Balance" (Live) (Norum, Kelly Keeling, Peter Baltes, Simon Wright) - 6:26

== Personnel ==
- John Norum - lead vocals, guitars
- Stefan Rodin - bass guitar
- Mats Olausson - keyboards
- Thomas Broman - drums
- Leif Sundin - lead vocals on "Center of Balance"
- Mats Levén - backing vocals

== Album credits ==
- John Norum - producer
