= Face the Truth (John Norum album) =

Studio album by John Norum
- Released: 2 April 1992 (Europe / Japan); 1994 (USA)
- Studios: Total Accessing Recording, Redondo Beach, California
- Genre: Hard rock
- Length: 43:37 (Europe / Japan); 41:31 (USA)
- Labels: CBS, Epic (Europe / Japan); Shrapnel (USA)
- Producers: John Norum, Wyn Davis

John Norum chronology
| Live in Stockholm (1990) | Face the Truth (1992) | Another Destination (1995) |

Face the Truth is the second solo album by John Norum—guitarist for the Swedish hard rock-band Europe. It was released in 1992.

Several songs on the album are sung by former Black Sabbath / Deep Purple vocalist Glenn Hughes. The song Opium Trail is a Thin Lizzy cover. We Will Be Strong--a duet with Europe vocalist Joey Tempest—is not included on the American edition of the album. The Swedish special edition contains a biography of John Norum written in Swedish.

== Track listing ==
=== European, Japanese Pressings ===
1. "Face the Truth" – 4:17 (Glenn Hughes, John Norum)
2. "Night Buzz" – 3:22 (Norum, Henrik Hildén, Michelle Meldrum)
3. "In Your Eyes" – 3:45 (Hughes, Norum, Peter Baltes)
4. "Opium Trail" – 4:00 (Brian Downey, Phil Lynott, Scott Gorham)
5. "We Will Be Strong" – 4:12 (Norum, Joey Tempest, Billy Haggerty)
6. "Good Man Shining" – 3:04 (Hughes, Norum, Mats Attaque, Micke Höglund, Thomas Broman)
7. "Time Will Find the Answer" – 5:02 (Hughes, Norum, Billy White)
8. "Counting on Your Love" – 3:16 (Göran Edman, Hughes, Tempest, Norum, Peter Hermansson)
9. "Endica" – 2:44 (Norum, Baltes)
10. "Still the Night" – 3:58 (Hughes, Pat Thrall, Paul Delph)
11. "Distant Voices" – 5:46 (Norum, Hughes, Baltes, White)

== Personnel ==
- John Norum – Guitars, backing vocals, lead vocals on tracks 2, 4 & co-lead vocals on 5
- Glenn Hughes – Lead vocals
- Peter Baltes – Bass
- Hempo Hildén – Drums
- Joey Tempest - Co-lead Vocals on "We Will Be Strong"
- Billy White - Rhythm guitar on "Time Will Find the Answer"
- Mikkey Dee - Drums on "Distant Voices"
- John Schreiner - Keyboards
- Andy Lorber - Additional backing vocals

== Album credits ==
- Produced by: John Norum and Wyn Davis
- Engineered by: Wyn Davis and Melissa Sewell
- Mixed by: Max Norman and Wyn Davis
- Mastered by: Bob Ludwig at Masterdisk
- Assistant Engineer: Doug Drury
- Recorded at: Total Access Recording, Redondo Beach, CA
- Mixed at: One on One, The Grey Room and The Enterprice [sic], Studio City, CA
- Logo Design by Johan Jäger / Drömfabriken
- Cover Design by: John Norum and Johan Jäger
