= John Norum =

Swedish guitarist (born 1964)

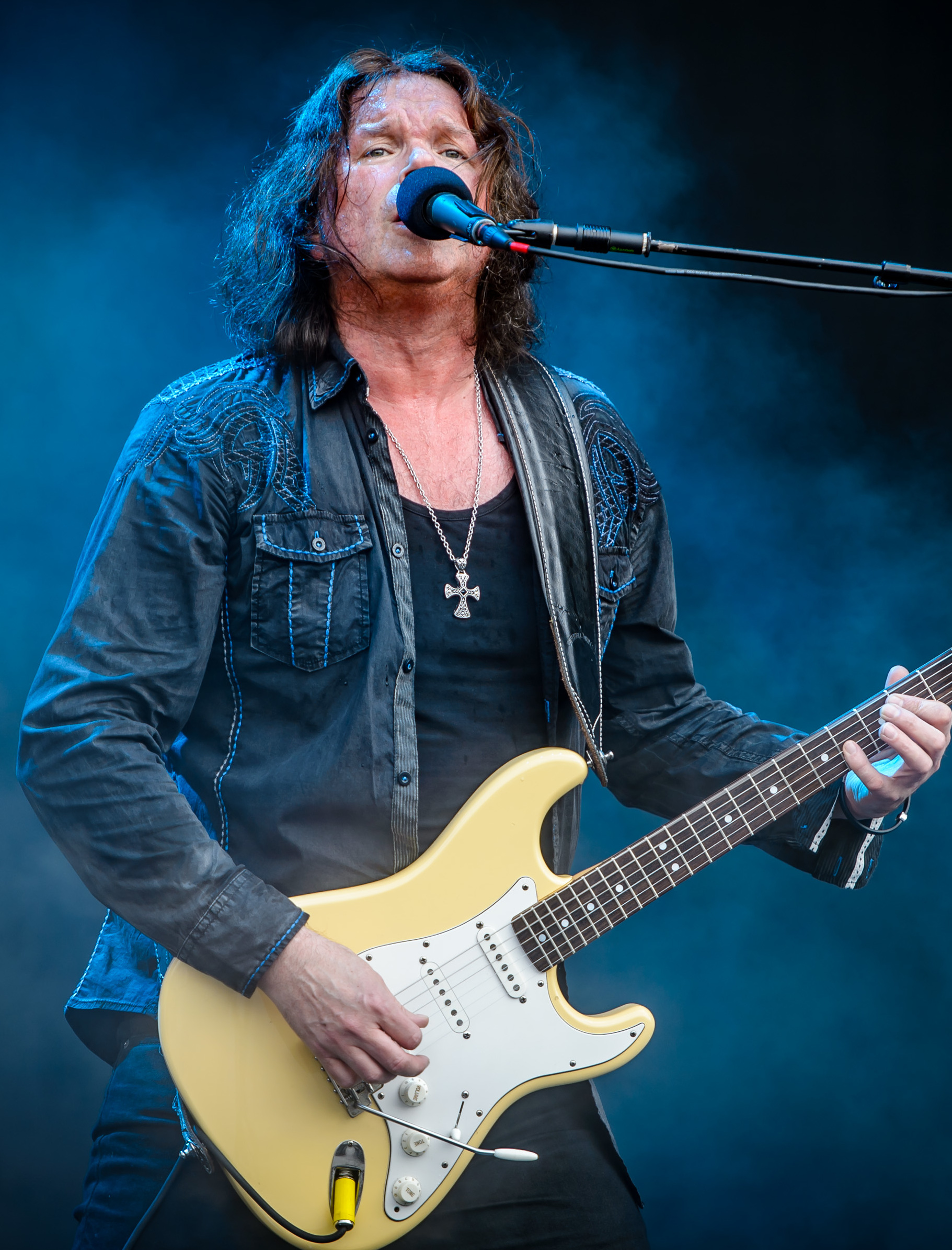
- Norum in 2017

Background information
- Born: John Terry Norum; 23 February 1964 (age 62); Vardø, Norway
- Genres: Heavy metal, hard rock, blues rock, AOR, glam metal
- Occupations: Musician, songwriter
- Instruments: Guitar, vocals
- Years active: 1979–present
- Spouse: Michelle Meldrum (m. 1995; died 2008) Camilla Wåhlander (m. 2025)
- Website: johnnorum.se

John Terry Norum (born 23 February 1964) is a Norwegian-born Swedish guitarist and one of the founders of the rock band Europe. Concurrent to his role with Europe, he also maintains a career as a solo artist.

== Biography ==
As an infant, Norum moved with his parents to Upplands Väsby (a Stockholm suburb), where he grew up and has spent most of his life.

During his career in music, Norum has played with Eddie Meduza & the Roaring Cadillacs, Dokken, Don Dokken's solo band, as well as collaborated with other well-known artists on his solo albums, including Glenn Hughes, Michael Schenker, Joey Tempest, Jeff Pilson, Kelly Keeling, Peter Baltes, Mikkey Dee, Simon Wright and Göran Edman. His influences include Gary Moore, Michael Schenker, Yngwie Malmsteen, John Sykes and Ritchie Blackmore.

In 1979, John Norum formed Force, which was Europe's first name, with vocalist Joey Tempest. Europe participated in and won the "Rock Sm", Swedish championship of rock, broadcast on television in 1982, with Norum being voted best guitarist and Joey best vocalist. The championship prize was the recording of a studio album by a small Swedish label.

The album Europe was released in February 1983, and became a hit in the band's home country and in Japan. In February 1984 Wings of Tomorrow, the band's next album was released, and the band started to become very popular on the Swedish scene, touring throughout the country, and also gaining recognition in Japan. The band signed to Epic Records in 1985 and recorded the album The Final Countdown at the end of the year. In May 1986, The Final Countdown was released, and quickly achieved success in several European countries, Japan, and United States. A series of disagreements between Norum and the band's manager Thomas Erdtman began to occur even before the tour began, which led the guitarist to decide to leave the band in November 1986.

After having left Europe, Norum signed a solo contract for three studio albums with Europe's label. His solo debut, Total Control, was released in October 1987. Norum sang on almost all of the songs, while Göran Edman sang on the other three. The album was successful in Sweden, getting to No. 4 in the Swedish charts and gaining platinum status (the single "Let Me Love You" also went to No. 4 in the Swedish charts; the ballad "Back on the Streets" to No. 34 Billboard US Rock). Norum won all the music awards of the year in the country in 1988. The band toured Sweden. Their last show took place at the Hammersmith Odeon in London, England in late 1988.

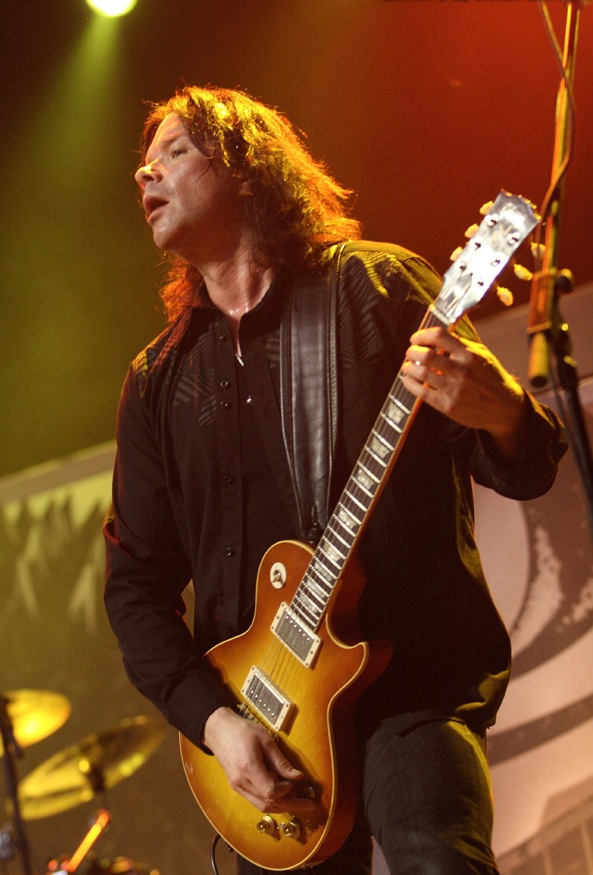
Norum performing in 2009

Norum's talent, evident on albums with Europe and his first solo album, sparked the interest of vocalist Don Dokken of the American band Dokken, who split up in 1988. Norum was enlisted to contribute to the album Up from the Ashes, which came out as Don Dokken's first solo album in 1990, and they went on tour in 1991. In 1990, Norum released a mini EP live, recorded in 1988, Live in Stockholm.

In 1992, the album Face the Truth was released. The album was a project with former Deep Purple frontman Glenn Hughes, with Hughes singing practically all of the songs. Joey Tempest also guested on the album.

In 1995, the album Another Destination was released, being his last release for Epic Records. He toured behind the album in Sweden with new vocalist, Kelly Keeling, who had also sung on the album. In December 1996, another album, Worlds Away released (again with Keeling singing), through a new record company, Mascot Records. The following year, a show in Japan was recorded (with new singer, Leif Sundin), which was released as the Face It Live album. At the end of 1997, John Norum performed 15 shows as part of Dokken in the United States, replacing George Lynch who had once again left the band.

In 1999, Norum released his last solo album before his return to Europe, Slipped into Tomorrow, with him on vocals. He went on tour in Scandinavia, with Thin Lizzy guitar player Brian Robertson playing songs of that band.

At the turn of the millennium, Norum participated in Europe's inaugural concert for Swedish TV, playing with the band again after 14 years of absence. He again joined the band that same year, this time at the Hard Rock Cafe in Stockholm, to play "Rock the Night".

In 2001, Norum joined Dokken as an official member. They toured the United States in 2001 and in 2002 released the Long Way Home album. During a tour of Europe, not satisfied with Don Dokken's temperament, he decided to leave the band. In 2003, Europe announced its official reforming of the classic five-man lineup, with Norum officially returning to the band, having not been a member for 17 years. He refused an offer by UFO before rejoining Europe (Norum had already rejected an offer from UFO in 1996, plus Michael Schenker who had left, upon learning of the offer made to Norum, returned to the band).

Since 2004, Europe has released six further studio albums, while Norum released a further sixth and seventh solo album, Optimus in 2005, and Play Yard Blues in 2010, singing on both albums. His latest solo album Gone to Stay was released in 2022.

== Personal life ==
Norum started and developed his musical career in Sweden, but has also lived in the United States for a few years, where he met and married Michelle Meldrum, founder and lead guitarist of the all-female hard rock band Phantom Blue and the Swedish metal band Meldrum, in 1995. The couple had one son, Jake Thomas, born on 22 September 2004. On 21 May 2008, Michelle died from a cystic growth in her brain. Another son, Jim Henry, was born on 16 April 2012, to him and Camilla Wåhlander. The couple also had a daughter, Celine Margareta, born on 28 July 2014. On February 15, 2025, John and Camilla got married.

Norum is the older brother of singer Tone Norum. and his stepfather is Thomas Witt, a former record producer, Columbia executive and drummer for Eddie Meduza. It has also been reported that Norum's mother after divorcing Witt dated Europe manager Thomas Erdtman.

== Equipment ==
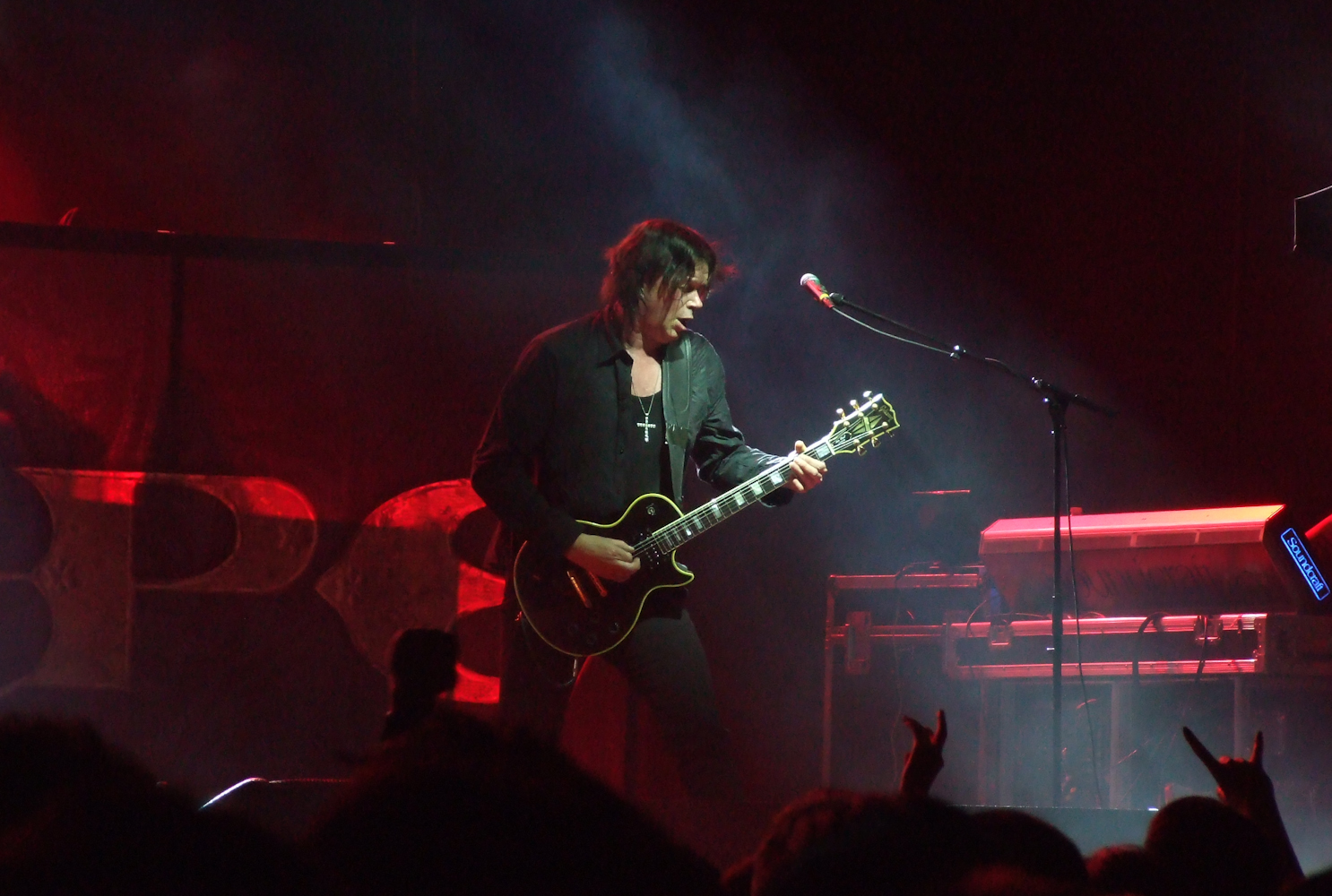
Norum performing with Europe in Festivalna hall, Sofia, Bulgaria, 2011

- Fender Stratocaster guitars
- Gibson Les Paul guitars
- Gibson Flying V guitars
- Paoletti John Norum Signature guitars
- Marshall JCM 800 2205 head
- Marshall '72 4x12 Cabinets with Celestion Greenbacks
- Dunlop Cry Baby Joe Bonamassa Wah Wah pedal
- Boss CE-2 Chorus pedal
- MXR Carbon Copy Analog Delay pedal
- MXR Phase 90 pedal
- Roland SDE 3000 Digital Delay
- Shure microphones

His guitar goes through the Wah into the chorus pedal, from where the separate outputs connect to the two amp heads, with the delay connected in the effects loop of the JCM 800 only.

== Discography ==
Eddie Meduza

- Eddie Meduza & the Roaring Cadillacs (1979)
- The Eddie Meduza Rock 'n' Roll Show (1979)
- Dåren É Lös! - The Roaring Cadillac's Live (1983)
- West A Fool Away (1984)

Europe

- Europe (1983)
- Wings of Tomorrow (1984)
- The Final Countdown (1986)
- Start from the Dark (2004)
- Secret Society (2006)
- Last Look at Eden (2009)
- Bag of Bones (2012)
- War of Kings (2015)
- Walk the Earth (2017)
- Come This Madness (2026)

As soloist

- Total Control (1987)
- Face the Truth (1992)
- Another Destination (1995)
- Worlds Away (1996)
- Slipped into Tomorrow (1999)
- Optimus (2005)
- Play Yard Blues (2010)
- Gone to stay (2022)

Don Dokken

- Up from the Ashes (1990)

Dokken

- Long Way Home (2002)

== Bibliography ==
- Tegnér A., Johansson, M. Europe - den stora rockdrömmen, Wiken, 1987, ISBN 91-7024-408-1
- John Norum. En biografi ver en Svensk gitarrhjalte, Sony Music Ent. Sweden, 1992. Contained on the Swedish special edition of Face the Truth.
- Bevilacqua F., John Norum's biography, 2010, last update December 2012
- Bevilacqua F., John Norum's discography , 2012, last update April 2012
- Stern M., Europe Biography, August 2006
