= Vagabonds Kings Warriors Angels =

Box set by Thin Lizzy
- Released: 7 December 2001
- Genres: Hard rock, blues rock
- Label: Vertigo
- Producer: Thin Lizzy

Thin Lizzy compilation albums chronology
Whiskey in the Jar (1996)	Vagabonds Kings Warriors Angels (2001)	Greatest Hits (2004)

Professional ratings
Review scores
Source	Rating
AllMusic	4.5/5 stars

Vagabonds Kings Warriors Angels is a 2001 4-disc set by Irish rock group Thin Lizzy, which also contains a book chronicling the life of the band and music in some detail, with rare photos and a discography. The set was packaged in a longbox format with the booklet fixed inside like a book.

As well as including all of Thin Lizzy's best known songs and successful hits, this set features a number of rarer tracks, such as the band's first single, "The Farmer", the 1973 b-side "Cruising in the Lizzymobile", and the 1978 live b-side "Me and the Boys", none of which had been released on CD before. "Try a Little Harder" was a previously unreleased outtake from the Fighting recording sessions, and "Song for Jimi" had only been available on a flexi disc given away with a magazine. Other non-album b-sides were also included, such as "Half Caste", "Just the Two of Us" and "Don't Play Around". All of these tracks except "Me and the Boys" and "Song for Jimi" were later re-released on expanded versions of the studio albums, as part of a remastering of the whole Thin Lizzy catalogue.

This boxed set also includes a small number of Phil Lynott solo songs, and one by his post-Thin Lizzy band, Grand Slam. The track "A Night in the Life of a Blues Singer" had been recorded in January 1978 by the Black Rose: A Rock Legend line-up of Thin Lizzy, but was eventually released as a Phil Lynott solo track on the 12" version of his "Nineteen" single in November 1985.

== Track listing ==
Disc 1 (1970–1973)

1. "The Farmer" (Philip Lynott)
2. "The Friendly Ranger at Clontarf Castle" (Eric Bell, Lynott)
3. "Remembering, Pt. 1" (Lynott)
4. "Dublin" (Lynott)
5. "Remembering, Pt. 2 (New Day)" (Lynott, Bell, Brian Downey)
6. "Things Ain't Workin' Out Down at the Farm" (Lynott)
7. "Buffalo Gal" (Lynott)
8. "Sarah" (Lynott)
9. "Brought Down" (Lynott)
10. "Whiskey in the Jar" (Trad. arr. Lynott, Bell, Downey)
11. "Black Boys on the Corner" (Lynott)
12. "Randolph's Tango" (Lynott)
13. "Broken Dreams" (Lynott, Bell, Downey)
14. "Vagabond of the Western World" (Lynott)
15. "Little Girl in Bloom" (Lynott)
16. "Slow Blues" (Lynott)
17. "The Rocker" (Lynott, Bell, Downey)
18. "Here I Go Again" (Lynott)

Disc 2 (1974–1975)

1. "Cruising in the Lizzymobile" (Downey, Bell, Lynott)
2. "Little Darling" (Lynott)
3. "Sitamoia" (Downey)
4. "Philomena" (Lynott)
5. "Still in Love with You" (Lynott)
6. "Showdown" (Lynott)
7. "It's Only Money" (Lynott)
8. "Rosalie" [Single Mix] (Bob Seger)
9. "Half Caste" (Lynott)
10. "King's Vengeance" (Scott Gorham, Lynott)
11. "Suicide" (Lynott)
12. "Wild One" (Lynott)
13. "Try a Little Harder" (Brian Robertson, Lynott)
14. "Fighting My Way Back" (Lynott)
15. "Jailbreak" (Lynott)
16. "Romeo and the Lonely Girl" (Lynott)
17. "The Boys Are Back in Town" (Lynott)
18. "Cowboy Song" (Lynott, Downey)
19. "Emerald" (Gorham, Robertson, Downey, Lynott)

Disc 3 (1976–1978)

1. "Johnny" (Lynott)
2. "Don't Believe a Word" (Lynott)
3. "Fools Gold" (Lynott)
4. "Johnny the Fox Meets Jimmy the Weed" (Lynott, Gorham, Downey)
5. "Massacre" (Lynott, Gorham, Downey)
6. "Soldier of Fortune" (Lynott)
7. "Bad Reputation" (Downey, Gorham, Lynott)
8. "Dancing in the Moonlight (It's Caught Me in Its Spotlight)" (Lynott)
9. "Killer Without a Cause" (Gorham, Lynott)
10. "Warrior" [Live] (Lynott, Gorham)
11. "Are You Ready" [Live] (Lynott, Gorham, Downey, Robertson)
12. "Rosalie/Cowgirl's Song" [Live] (Seger, Lynott, Downey)
13. "Me and the Boys" [Live] (Lynott)
14. "Parisienne Walkways" (Lynott, Gary Moore) ‡
15. "Do Anything You Want To" (Lynott)
16. "Waiting for an Alibi" (Lynott)
17. "Sarah" (Lynott, Moore)
18. "Got to Give It Up" (Lynott, Gorham)
19. "Roisin Dubh (Black Rose): A Rock Legend" (Lynott, Moore)
20. "Just the Two of Us" (Lynott, Gorham)

Disc 4 (1979–1985)

1. "Dear Miss Lonely Hearts" (Lynott, Jimmy Bain) ¶
2. "King's Call" (Lynott) ¶
3. "Chinatown" (Downey, Gorham, Lynott, Snowy White)
4. "Sugar Blues" [Live] (Downey, Gorham, Lynott, White)
5. "Killer on the Loose" (Lynott)
6. "Don't Play Around" (Lynott, Gorham)
7. "Song for Jimi" (Lynott)
8. "Renegade" (Lynott, White)
9. "Hollywood (Down on Your Luck)" (Gorham, Lynott)
10. "Old Town" (Bain, Lynott) ¶
11. "Thunder and Lightning" (Lynott, Downey)
12. "Cold Sweat" (Lynott, John Sykes)
13. "The Sun Goes Down" (Lynott, Darren Wharton)
14. "Sisters of Mercy" (Lynott, Mark Stanway) †
15. "Nineteen" (Lynott) ¶
16. "A Night in the Life of a Blues Singer" (Lynott) ¶
- All tracks by Thin Lizzy except:

‡ by Gary Moore
¶ by Phil Lynott
† by Grand Slam.

== Personnel ==
- Phil Lynott – bass guitar except disc 4: track 10, vocals
- Brian Downey – drums, percussion except disc 3: track 17; disc 4: tracks 10 and 14–15
- Eric Bell – guitar, backing vocals on disc 1; disc 2: track 1; disc 4: track 7 (lead guitar removed)
- Scott Gorham – guitar, backing vocals on disc 2: tracks 4, 6–19; disc 3: tracks 1–13, 15–16, 18–20; disc 4: tracks 1–6, 8–9, 11–13, 16
- Brian Robertson – guitar, backing vocals on disc 2: tracks 4, 6–19; disc 3: tracks 1–5, 9–13
- Gary Moore – guitar, backing vocals on disc 2: tracks 2–3, 5; disc 3: tracks 14–20; disc 4: track 16
- Snowy White – guitar, backing vocals on disc 4: tracks 1–6, 8–9
- John Sykes – guitar, backing vocals on disc 4: tracks 11–13
- Eric Wrixon – keyboards on disc 1: track 1
- Darren Wharton – keyboards, backing vocals on disc 4: tracks 3–6, 8–13
- Frankie Miller – joint lead vocals on disc 2: track 5
- Roger Chapman – backing vocals on disc 2: track 8
- John Helliwell – saxophone on disc 3: track 8
- Huey Lewis – harmonica on disc 3: track 17
- Mark Nauseef – drums on disc 3: track 17
- Mark Knopfler – guitar on disc 4: track 2
- Rusty Egan – drums on disc 4: track 10
- Jimmy Bain – bass guitar and backing vocals on disc 4: track 10
- Laurence Archer – guitar on disc 4: track 14
- Doish Nagle – guitar on disc 4: track 14
- Mark Stanway – keyboards on disc 4: track 14
- Robbie Brennan – drums on disc 4: track 14
- Paul Hardcastle – keyboards on disc 4: track 15
- Robin George – guitar on disc 4: track 15

== Charts ==
Chart (2001)	Peak position
UK Rock & Metal Albums (Official Charts)	30
