= Grand Slam (band) =

British (originally Irish) rock band

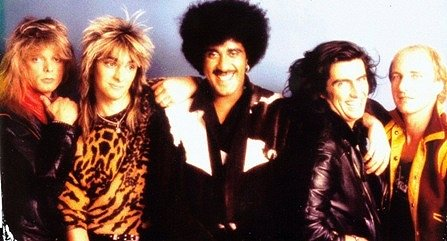
- Original Grand Slam line-up in 1984. L–R: Mark Stanway, Laurence Archer, Phil Lynott, Doish Nagle, Robbie Brennan

Background information
- Also known as: Phil Lynott's Grand Slam (1984–1985)
- Origin: Ireland (1984); London, England (2018)
- Genres: Hard rock
- Years active: 1984–1985, 2016, 2018–present
- Labels: Marshall (2019); Silver Lining Music (2023–present)
- Spinoff of: Thin Lizzy, Magnum
- Members: Laurence Archer; Mike Dyer; Rocky Newton; Benjy Reid
- Past members: Mark Stanway; Phil Lynott; Robbie Brennan; Doish Nagle; Brian Downey; Neil Murray; Micky Barker; Stefan Berggren; David Boyce

Grand Slam (or Phil Lynott's Grand Slam) are an Irish-British rock band originally formed in 1984 by Phil Lynott (lead vocals and bass guitar), after the breakup of his earlier ensemble Thin Lizzy. Grand Slam was active for a year, and Lynott died in 1986. The band was revived in 2016 by original members Mark Stanway (keyboards) and Laurence Archer (guitar).

== Early history ==
The birth of Grand Slam can be traced back to the solo band Lynott formed during July/August 1983 for a tour of Scandinavia. This line-up featured Thin Lizzy members Brian Downey (drums) and John Sykes (lead guitar); plus keyboardist Mark Stanway (Magnum) and rhythm guitarist Doish Nagle (ex-The Bogey Boys). When Thin Lizzy completed its farewell tour in September 1983, Lynott continued working with this configuration as a band project that eventually became known as Grand Slam. Sykes departed the project following an offer to join Whitesnake and was replaced with guitarist Laurence Archer (ex Stampede), who had previously been approached by Lynott. Prior to the band's first shows, Downey left to be replaced by Robbie Brennan.

The name Grand Slam was chosen after a plethora of other band names had been considered, including Reactor Factor, Catastrophe, Hell Bent On Havoc, Slam Anthem and Slam, the name of a song Lynott had in mind. Lynott earned the nickname "Sergeant Rock" at the rehearsals at the E'EE studios in London, due to his almost overbearing strictness and dedication to the rehearsal drill.

With the line-up of Lynott, Stanway, Archer, Nagle and Brennan, Grand Slam played its first show in Waterford, Ireland on 26 April 1984. The band's live set contained a mixture of new songs, written by various combinations of Lynott, Stanway and Archer, as well as songs from Lynott's solo career plus selected Thin Lizzy songs. Lynott was keen to avoid any 'second-rate Thin Lizzy' tag, and was adamant that they should only ever perform three Lizzy songs live ("Cold Sweat", from their 1983 album Thunder and Lightning, "Sarah", from Lizzy's 1979 album Black Rose: A Rock Legend, and the crowd favourite, "Whiskey In the Jar", which can be found on Grand Slam: Live 1984).

Grand Slam toured extensively in the UK and Eire throughout 1984, with shows favourably received by both audiences and media. The band also appeared at high-profile festivals such as Crystal Palace (as special guests of Status Quo), Nostell Priory (as special guests of Marillion) and the Kerrang Weekender festival in Great Yarmouth, the latter show broadcast by BBC Radio One.

Despite shows being well received by audiences and the band having built up a large cult following, Grand Slam failed to secure a record deal, largely due to Lynott's reputation as a drug user during his later Thin Lizzy days. The original Grand Slam played its final show at Walthamstow Standard, London on 7 December 1984 and folded shortly after.

Phil Lynott died on 4 January 1986 from liver, heart and kidney failure, due to years of drug abuse and alcohol excess.

Several original songs from Grand Slam's catalogue resurfaced on Thin Lizzy releases including "Nineteen" (also released as a Phil Lynott's final single in 1985), "Sisters of Mercy" and "Dedication". The latter became the subject of controversy upon its inclusion as the title track of the Dedication: The Very Best of Thin Lizzy compilation in 1991. Originally recorded as a Grand Slam demo by its authors, Laurence Archer and Phil Lynott, Thin Lizzy's management had former members Scott Gorham and Brian Downey overdub guitar and drum tracks, respectively, and in an attempt to pass the song off as a Lynott solo composition. Archer was uncredited as a songwriter, but later settled out-of-court for a share of the publishing. The Grand Slam song "Military Man" was also recorded by Lynott and Gary Moore on Moore's 1985 album Run For Cover

In 2002 and 2003, keyboardist Mark Stanway produced several releases of previously unreleased live, studio and demo material of Grand Slam compiled from his personal archive.

Guitarist Laurence Archer recorded a solo album, titled LA, in 1986, and went on to record and tour with a number of acts, including Brian Spence, Rhode Island Red (with drummer Manolo Antonana), UFO, and Medicine Head.

== Reunion ==
In 2016, Mark Stanway reformed Grand Slam together with Laurence Archer, drummer Micky Barker (ex Magnum), bassist Neil Murray (ex Whitesnake, Black Sabbath etc.) and vocalist Stefan Berggren (ex M3 Classic Whitesnake). This line-up made appearances at the Sweden Rock Festival and the Robin 2, Bilston.

In 2018, Laurence Archer with Mike Dyer, Dave Boyce and Benjy Reid recorded a new Grand Slam studio album at VADA Recording studios with producer Matt Terry, reworking 3 of the original Grand slam material written by Phil Lynott, Laurence Archer and Mark Stanway. along with new material written by Laurence Archer in collaboration with Mike Dyer, David Boyce and Benjy Reid. The album was released as Hit the Ground in November 2019. Mark Stanway did not feature in the line-up but contributed keyboards to three of the ten tracks.

in 2024, Grand Slam released a cover of Thin Lizzy's "Whiskey In the Jar", to honor Phil Lynott on what would have been his 75th birthday.

== Original line-up ==
- Phil Lynott - lead vocals, bass guitar
- John Sykes - lead guitar, backing vocals (1983)
- Laurence Archer - lead guitar, backing vocals (1984)
- Doish Nagle - rhythm guitar, backing vocals
- Mark Stanway - keyboards, synthesizers, piano, backing vocals
- Brian Downey - drums (1983)
- Robbie Brennan - drums (1984)

== Current line-up ==
- Laurence Archer - guitar
- Mike Dyer - vocals
- Rocky Newton - bass
- Benjy Reid - drums

== Discography ==
Studio recordings

- 2002 - Studio Sessions - collection of recordings from 1984
- 2019 - Hit the Ground - first official album as working unit
- 2024 - Wheel of Fortune

Live recordings

- 2003 - Grand Slam: Live 1984
- 2003 - Twilight's Last Gleaming (Live album, the bulk recorded in London at the Marquee Club on 4 December 1984.)
- 2008 - Glasgow Kiss (Live album recorded at Glasgow Mayfair on 30 October 1984.)

Compilations

- 2007 - The Grand Slam Years (3-CD box set collection of live and studio tracks.)
  - Disc 1: Phil Lynott Live In Sweden 1983
  - Disc 2: Live in Ireland 1984
  - Disc 3: Studio Sessions
- 2009 - The Collection (4-CD longbox collection of live and studio tracks.)
  - Disc 1: Phil Lynott Live in Sweden 1983
  - Disc 2: Live in Ireland 1984 - Galway / Castlebar / Lifford
  - Disc 3: Studio Sessions
  - Disc 4: Live at the Nostell Priory Festival, Wakefield, 27 August 1984

Singles

- 2002 - "Whiter Shade of Pale/Like a Rolling Stone"
- 2003 - "Whiskey in the Jar" (Live)
- 2023 - "Nineteen" (2022 Remix)
- 2023 - "Sarah" (2022 Remix)
- 2023 - "Military Man" (2022 Remix)
- 2024 - "There Goes My Heart"
- 2024 - "Spitfire"
