= Dedication (Thin Lizzy song) =

1991 song by Thin Lizzy

Single by Thin Lizzy

from the album Dedication: The Very Best of Thin Lizzy
- B-side: "Cold Sweat"
- Released: 14 January 1991
- Length: 4:00
- Label: Vertigo
- Songwriters: Laurence Archer; Phil Lynott

Thin Lizzy singles chronology
"The Sun Goes Down" (1983)	"Dedication" (1991)	"The Boys Are Back in Town" (1991)

"Dedication" is a song by Irish rock band Thin Lizzy, released by Vertigo Records on 14 January 1991 as a single from their compilation album Dedication: The Very Best of Thin Lizzy (1991). It reached number 2 in the Irish Singles Chart and number 35 in the UK singles chart. The song was written by Laurence Archer and Phil Lynott, and was originally intended for their band Grand Slam.

== Writing and recording ==
"Dedication" was written by guitarist Laurence Archer in about 1982 while he was in the band Stampede. When Archer joined Phil Lynott's post-Thin Lizzy band Grand Slam in 1984, Lynott re-wrote much of the lyric and the pair then recorded a rough demo of it. Grand Slam never recorded the song as they failed to secure a record deal and split up in 1985.

In 1990, Phonogram Records, the parent company of Vertigo Records, commissioned a new Thin Lizzy compilation, Dedication: The Very Best of Thin Lizzy, for an early 1991 release. When ex-Thin Lizzy guitarist Scott Gorham was contacted about the project, he suggested it would be "nice to put something a little different on it". The band's former manager Chris Morrison suggested developing the Archer/Lynott demo of "Dedication" into a Thin Lizzy track, with the involvement of former band members Scott Gorham, Gary Moore and Brian Downey. Gorham subsequently redid the guitar and Downey redid the drums at Swanyard Studios in Islington. Moore agreed to contribute but by the time he had "learnt the song, formulated a few ideas and got ready to record it", he discovered the song's recording session had already taken place. The engineer Chris Sheldon was hired to mix the original demo track and then oversee the additional recording. The engineer Simon Vinestock was approached afterwards to mix the song. In a 1991 interview with Kerrang!, Gorham said:

"It's not [Phil's] greatest performance vocally but the thing that is good about it is that he did it in one take, so it's effectively a live take. I just went in and redid all the guitars, and Brian redid the drums, just to bring it up to scratch. I think it works. I only had one day to put it together, which was a bit of a drag."

== Release ==
"Dedication" was released as a single in the UK and Europe on 14 January 1991, preceding the 4 February 1991 release date of the Dedication: The Very Best of Thin Lizzy album. In March 1991, the single was given a promotional only release in North America.

The song was the subject of legal issues after it was released as the writing credit was given solely to Lynott and omitted Archer altogether. Archer first became aware of the song's release as a Thin Lizzy song when someone informed him that they had heard the song on the radio. He recalled in 1998: "Naturally I was furious with [Chris] Morrison when I saw what he'd done with 'Dedication', and there was a lot of nasty feeling. In the end I had to sign away the rights to six other [Grand Slam] songs I'd been involved with in order to get the money for 'Dedication'."

== Music video ==
The song's accompanying music video used archive footage of the band.

== Critical reception ==
Upon its release as a single, David Quantick, writing for the NME, stated that "Dedication" "shows off Lynott's penchant for sticking a neat twisty tune over chunking great rock riffs". David Owens of the South Wales Echo described it as an "ebullient and triumphant rock song". Peter Kinghorn of the Evening Chronicle called it a "foretaste of what promises to be a brilliant greatest hits album" and a track that "underlines [Lynott's] great loss to rock". A reviewer for the Lancashire Evening Telegraph noted that "in true style, there's a twin-pronged guitar attack and a potent bass line". They concluded: "It saddens me that one of the finest rock bands of these isles, always underrated, died prematurely with Phil Lynott." In the US, Larry Flick of Billboard magazine called it a "guitar-screaming traditional rocker that makes the listener want to just close his/her eyes and fly away". He added that "beneath the tune's many layers is a message of spontaneous generosity that should find shelter on album-rock avenues".

== Track listing ==
7–inch single (UK and Europe) and cassette single (UK)

1. "Dedication" – 4:00
2. "Cold Sweat" – 3:06

12–inch and CD single (UK and Europe)

1. "Dedication" – 4:00
2. "Cold Sweat" – 3:06
3. "Emerald" (live) – 4:25
4. "Still in Love with You" (live) – 7:45

12–inch limited edition picture disc single (UK)

1. "Dedication" – 4:00
2. "Cold Sweat" – 3:06
3. "China Town" – 4:44
4. "Bad Reputation" – 3:10

CD promotional single (US and Canada)

1. "Dedication" – 4:00

== Personnel ==
Thin Lizzy

- Phil Lynott – lead vocals
- Scott Gorham – guitars
- Brian Downey – drums

Additional musicians

- Laurence Archer – bass guitar

Production

- Chris Sheldon – additional recording ("Dedication")
- Simon Vinestock – mixing ("Dedication")

Other

- Pete Cronin – photography
- Redferns – photography (12-inch picture sleeve only)

== Charts ==
Chart (1991)	Peak position
Europe (Eurochart Hot 100)	64
Ireland (IRMA)	2
UK Singles (Official Charts)	35
UK Metal Singles (Gallup)	1
US Mainstream Rock (Billboard)	22
US AOR Tracks (Radio & Records)	20
