= Refugee (Bad4Good album) =

Studio album by Bad4Good
- Released: August 18, 1992
- Genre: Heavy metal; hard rock
- Length: 56:04
- Label: Interscope
- Producer: Steve Vai

Refugee is the only album by teenaged rock band Bad4Good, released in August 1992 by Interscope Records. The album was produced by Steve Vai. The band toured briefly with Damn Yankees before disbanding in 1993.

== Reception ==
Professional ratings
Review scores
Source	Rating
Allmusic	4.5/5 stars

Two months after its release in August, the album hit the Billboard Heatseekers chart, at #39. It was later deemed to be a "flop" by Interscope.

== Track listing ==
1. Nineteen (Phil Lynott, Laurence Archer cover) (3:56)
2. Curious Intentions (3:49)
3. Bangin' Time Again (4:27)
4. Mother of Love (3:54)
5. Devil in the Angel (4:10)
6. Rockin' My Body (4:00)
7. Slow and Beautiful (5:22)
8. Tyre Kickin' (Ya Makin' Me Nervous) (6:04)
9. Terminate (4:23)
10. Nothin' Great About A Heartache (4:29)
11. We're Gonna Fight (4:10)
12. I Want Everything (4:18)
13. Felony (3:18)

== Personnel ==
- Danny Cooksey - Lead Vocals
- Thomas McRocklin - Lead Guitar
- Zach Young - Bass Guitar, Backing Vocals
- Brooks Wackerman - Drums
- Michael Bower Background Vocals Tracks 5,7,11,12,13
- Blake Sennett Background Vocals Tracks 5,7,11,12,13

== Music videos ==
"Nineteen"

"Nothin' Great About A Heartache"
