= Wild One: The Very Best of Thin Lizzy =

Greatest hits album by Thin Lizzy
- Released: 2 January 1996
- Recorded: 1972–1984
- Genre: Hard rock, blues rock
- Length: 76:30
- Label: Vertigo / Mercury

Thin Lizzy compilation albums chronology
The Rocker (1994)	Wild One: The Very Best of Thin Lizzy (1996)	Whiskey in the Jar (1996)

Professional ratings
Review scores
Source	Rating
AllMusic	4.5/5 stars
NME	9/10
Q	4/5 stars

Wild One: The Very Best of Thin Lizzy is a 1996 compilation album by Irish rock band Thin Lizzy. It was released ten years after the death of frontman Phil Lynott in 1986 as a tribute to him.

Although the album shares its title with the Thin Lizzy song of the same name, and also quotes the chorus of the song on the back of the album, the song itself is not actually included. A limited two-CD edition of the album was also released, containing rare live tracks from various limited edition releases throughout the band's career on the second disc.

== Track listing ==
All songs written by Phil Lynott unless stated.

=== Disc 1 ===
1. "The Boys Are Back in Town"
2. "Jailbreak"
3. "Don't Believe a Word"
4. "Waiting for an Alibi"
5. "Rosalie/Cowgirl's Song" (live) (Bob Seger, Lynott, Brian Downey)
6. "Cold Sweat" (Lynott, John Sykes)
7. "Thunder and Lightning" (Downey, Lynott)
8. "Out in the Fields"* (Gary Moore)
9. "Dancin' in the Moonlight"
10. "Parisienne Walkways"* (Lynott, Moore)
11. "Sarah" (Lynott, Moore)
12. "Still in Love with You" (live)
13. "Emerald" (Scott Gorham, Brian Robertson, Downey, Lynott)
14. "Bad Reputation" (Downey, Gorham, Lynott)
15. "Killer on the Loose"
16. "Chinatown" (Downey, Gorham, Lynott, Snowy White)
17. "Do Anything You Want To"
18. "The Rocker" (Lynott, Eric Bell, Downey)
19. "Whiskey in the Jar" (Trad. arr. Lynott, Bell, Downey)

*"Out in the Fields" and "Parisienne Walkways" were originally released as a Gary Moore & Phil Lynott track and a Gary Moore solo track, respectively.

=== Disc 2 (Japan only) ===
All of the tracks on the bonus disc are live recordings.

1. "Bad Reputation" (Gorham, Downey, Lynott)
2. "Opium Trail" (Gorham, Downey, Lynott)
3. "Are You Ready" (Gorham, Robertson, Downey, Lynott)
4. "Dear Miss Lonely Hearts" (Jimmy Bain, Lynott)
5. "Chinatown" (Downey, Gorham, Lynott, White)
6. "Got to Give It Up" (Gorham, Lynott)
7. "Emerald" (Gorham, Robertson, Downey, Lynott)
8. "Killer on the Loose"
9. "The Boys Are Back in Town"
10. "Hollywood" (Gorham, Lynott)

Tracks 1, 2 recorded live at Seneca College Fieldhouse, Toronto October 28, 1977

Tracks 3, 4, 6 recorded live at Dublin RDS Hall June 7, 1980

Track 5 recorded live at Hammersmith Odeon, London May 29, 1980

Tracks 7 to 10 recorded live in Britain 1983

== Personnel ==
- Phil Lynott – bass guitar, vocals
- Brian Downey – drums, percussion
- Scott Gorham – guitar, except tracks 8, 11, 18 & 19
- Eric Bell – guitar on tracks 18 & 19
- Brian Robertson – guitar on tracks 1–3, 5, 12 & 13
- Gary Moore – guitar on tracks 4, 8, 10, 11 & 17
- Snowy White – guitar on tracks 15 & 16
- John Sykes – guitar on tracks 6 & 7
- Darren Wharton – keyboards on tracks 6 & 7

== Charts ==
Chart (1996)	Peak position
Scottish Albums (Official Charts)	21
Swedish Albums (Sverigetopplistan)	21
UK Albums (Official Charts)	18
UK Rock & Metal Albums (Official Charts)	2

== Certifications ==
Region	Certification	Certified units/sales
United Kingdom (BPI)	Gold	100,000^{^}
^{^} Shipments figures based on certification alone.
