= Dedication: The Very Best of Thin Lizzy =

Compilation album

Greatest hits album by Thin Lizzy
- Released: 4 February 1991
- Genres: Hard rock, blues rock
- Length: 74:35
- Labels: Vertigo; Mercury (US only)

Thin Lizzy compilation albums chronology
The Best of Phil Lynott and Thin Lizzy - Soldier of Fortune (1987)	Dedication: The Very Best of Thin Lizzy (1991)	The Rocker (1994)

Dedication: The Very Best of Thin Lizzy

Video by Thin Lizzy
- Released: 18 February 1991
- Genres: Hard rock, blues rock
- Length: 55 min
- Label: PolyGram Video

Thin Lizzy video chronology
Thin Lizzy Live at Sydney Harbour '78 (1988)	Dedication: The Very Best of Thin Lizzy (1991)	Live at the National Stadium (2012)

Professional ratings
Review scores
Source	Rating
AllMusic	4.5/5 stars

Dedication: The Very Best of Thin Lizzy is a compilation album released by rock group Thin Lizzy in 1991. The only previously unreleased track was "Dedication", which was reconstructed after band leader Phil Lynott's death, using an old 8 track demo recording of a Grand Slam song originally recorded around 1985 and written by guitarist Laurence Archer. This track was the subject of a High Court case, as following Lynott's death Thin Lizzy released this track as a lost Thin Lizzy track, removing Archer's guitar and the writing credit from the track (but leaving Archer's Bass intact). Archer is now credited for writing this track.

There was also a VHS video release to accompany the album.

== Track listings ==
=== UK & Japanese CD ===
No.	Title	Writer(s)	Originally from	Length
1.	"Whiskey in the Jar"	Traditional, arranged by Phil Lynott, Eric Bell, Brian Downey	non-album single (1972)	5:45
2.	"The Rocker" (single edit)	Lynott, Bell, Downey	Vagabonds of the Western World (1973)	2:45
3.	"Jailbreak"	Lynott	Jailbreak (1976)	4:04
4.	"The Boys Are Back in Town"	Lynott	Jailbreak	4:27
5.	"Don't Believe a Word"	Lynott	Johnny the Fox (1976)	2:21
6.	"Bad Reputation"	Downey, Scott Gorham, Lynott	Bad Reputation (1977)	3:10
7.	"Dancing in the Moonlight (It's Caught Me in Its Spotlight)"	Lynott	Bad Reputation	3:24
8.	"Rosalie / Cowgirl's Song" (live)	Bob Seger / Lynott, Downey	Live and Dangerous (1978)	4:00
9.	"Still in Love with You" (live)	Lynott	Live and Dangerous	7:40
10.	"Emerald" (live)	Gorham, Brian Robertson, Downey, Lynott	Live and Dangerous	4:18
11.	"Waiting for an Alibi" (extended version)	Lynott, Gary Moore	Black Rose: A Rock Legend (1979)	4:13
12.	"Do Anything You Want To"	Lynott	Black Rose: A Rock Legend	3:52
13.	"Sarah"	Lynott, Moore	Black Rose: A Rock Legend	4:20
14.	"Parisienne Walkways"	Lynott, Moore	Gary Moore album Back on the Streets (1978)	3:19
15.	"Chinatown"	Downey, Gorham, Lynott, Snowy White	Chinatown (1980)	4:44
16.	"Killer on the Loose"	Lynott	Chinatown	3:55
17.	"Out in the Fields"	Moore	Gary Moore and Phil Lynott single	4:18
18.	"Dedication"	Lynott, Laurence Archer	previously unreleased	4:00
Total length:				74:35

- The track listing for all non-US vinyl releases is the same as above minus "Bad Reputation", "Still in Love with You", "Emerald" and "Chinatown".

=== All US releases ===
No.	Title	Writer(s)	Originally from	Length
1.	"Whiskey in the Jar"	Traditional, arranged by Phil Lynott, Eric Bell, Brian Downey	non-album single	5:45
2.	"The Rocker"	Lynott, Bell, Downey	Vagabonds of the Western World (1973)	2:43
3.	"She Knows"	Gorham, Lynott	Nightlife (1974)	5:12
4.	"Still in Love with You"	Lynott	Nightlife	5:38
5.	"Showdown"	Lynott	Nightlife	4:31
6.	"Rosalie"	Bob Seger	Fighting (1975)	3:11
7.	"Wild One"	Lynott	Fighting	4:18
8.	"Fighting My Way Back"	Lynott	Fighting	3:12
9.	"Jailbreak"	Lynott	Jailbreak (1976)	4:04
10.	"The Boys Are Back in Town"	Lynott	Jailbreak	4:27
11.	"Cowboy Song"	Lynott, Downey	Jailbreak	5:16
12.	"Don't Believe a Word"	Lynott	Johnny the Fox (1976)	2:21
13.	"Bad Reputation"	Downey, Gorham, Lynott	Bad Reputation (1977)	3:10
14.	"Dancing in the Moonlight (It's Caught Me in Its Spotlight)"	Lynott	Bad Reputation	3:24
15.	"Do Anything You Want To"	Lynott	Black Rose: A Rock Legend (1979)	3:52
16.	"Waiting for an Alibi"	Lynott, Moore	Black Rose: A Rock Legend	4:13
17.	"Chinatown"	Downey, Gorham, Lynott, White	Chinatown (1980)	4:44
18.	"Dedication"	Lynott, Archer	previously unreleased	4:00
Total length:				74:01

=== VHS ===
1. "The Rocker"
2. "Whiskey in the Jar"
3. "The Boys Are Back in Town"
4. "Jailbreak"
5. "Don't Believe a Word"
6. "Bad Reputation"
7. "Dancin' in the Moonlight (It's Caught Me in Its Spotlight)"
8. "Rosalie" (live)
9. "Waiting for an Alibi"
10. "Do Anything You Want To"
11. "Sarah"
12. "Chinatown"
13. "Killer on the Loose"
14. "Out in the Fields"
15. "Dedication"

== Singles ==
- "Dedication" / "Cold Sweat" – 14 January 1991

A 12" and CD single were also released, featuring the extra tracks "Emerald" (live) / "Still in Love With You" (live).
A 12" picture disc was also released, with two different tracks, "Chinatown" / "Bad Reputation".

- "The Boys Are Back in Town (Remix)" / "Sarah" – 11 March 1991

A 12", picture disc and CD single were also released, all featuring four tracks: "The Boys Are Back in Town (Remix)" / "Johnny the Fox Meets Jimmy the Weed" / "Black Boys on the Corner" / "Me and the Boys (Live)".

== Personnel ==
- Phil Lynott – bass guitar (except track 18), vocals
- Brian Downey – drums, percussion
- Eric Bell – guitar on tracks 1 and 2
- Scott Gorham – guitar on tracks 3–12, 15, 16 and 18 (plus the US-only tracks)
- Brian Robertson – guitar on tracks 3–5, 8–10 (plus the US-only tracks)
- Gary Moore – guitar on tracks 11–14 and 17, co-lead vocals on track 17
- Snowy White – guitar on tracks 15 and 16
- Laurence Archer – bass guitar on track 18

== Charts ==
Chart (1991–92)	Peak position
Finnish Albums (The Official Finnish Charts)	30
Swedish Albums (Sverigetopplistan)	37
UK Albums (Official Charts)	8
