= Live 1984 =

Live 1984 may refer to:

- Grand Slam: Live 1984 a live album by Irish rock band Grand Slam released in 2003 but recorded in 1984
- David Gilmour Live 1984 film by David Gilmour from his 1984 tour from the album About Face for Europe
- Live 1984 by Gregory Isaacs
