= Grand Slam: Live 1984 =

Live album by Grand Slam
- Released: 2003
- Recorded: Disc 1: March - April 1984; Disc 2: 27 August 1984
- Genre: Rock
- Length: Disc 1: 49:44
- Label: Zoom Club Records (Ireland); Universal Music
- Producer: Mark Stanway; Phil Lynott

Grand Slam: Live 1984 is a live album by Irish rock band Grand Slam, released in 2003 but recorded in 1984.

Issued as both a single disc and an extremely limited double disc version, the first disc is a collection of live recordings from Grand Slam's first three concerts, recorded from 30 March to 1 April in various Irish locations, including Galway and Castlebar. Indeed, Lynott explains at the end of "Yellow Pearl" that the reason for the number of covers they performed was because "this is only the second gig", meaning the band had not had the chance to write enough of their own material.

The second disc is a 'Video CD' recording of their set at the Nostell Priory Festival in Wakefield on 27 August 1984.

== Track listing ==
Disc one

1. "Nineteen" (Phil Lynott) - 4:23
2. "Yellow Pearl" (Lynott, Midge Ure) - 4:46
3. "Sarah" (Lynott, Gary Moore) - 4:08
4. "Parisienne Walkways" (Lynott, Moore) - 4:54
5. "Crime Rate" (Lynott, Mark Stanway) - 5:49
6. "Young Boy" (Lynott, Stanway) - 4:26
7. "Whiter Shade of Pale / Like a Rolling Stone" (Gary Brooker, Keith Reid / Bob Dylan) - 5:31
8. "Night in the Life of a Blues Singer" (Lynott) - 5:51
9. "Cold Sweat" (Lynott, John Sykes) - 3:11
10. "Dear Miss Lonely Hearts" (Lynott, Jimmy Bain) - 4:19
11. "Whiskey in the Jar" (Trad. arr. Lynott, Eric Bell, Brian Downey) - 7:15

Disc two

1. "Sisters of Mercy" (Lynott, Mark Stanway)
2. "Military Man" (Lynott, Stanway)
3. "Harlem" (Lynott, Doish Nagle)
4. "Dedication" (Lynott, Laurence Archer)
5. "Parisienne Walkways" (Lynott, Moore)
6. "I Don't Need This" (Lynott, Stanway)
7. "Dear Miss Lonely Hearts" (Lynott, Bain)
8. "Cold Sweat" (Lynott, Sykes)
9. "Crime Rate" (Lynott, Stanway)

== Personnel ==
Grand Slam

- Phil Lynott - bass guitar, vocals
- Robbie Brennan - drums
- Laurence Archer - lead guitar
- Donald 'Doish' Nagle - guitar, backing vocals
- Mark Stanway - keyboards

Technical

- Sue Peters - photography
- Martin Walker - re-mastering
- Compiled and produced by Mark Stanway
