= Whiskey in the Jar (album) =

Whiskey In The Jar

Compilation album by Thin Lizzy
- Released: 18 March 1996
- Recorded: 1971–1973
- Genre: Hard rock, blues rock
- Length: 70:28
- Label: Karussell, Spectrum, Universal

Thin Lizzy compilation albums chronology
| Wild One: The Very Best of Thin Lizzy (1996) | Whiskey In The Jar (1996) | Vagabonds Kings Warriors Angels (2001) |

Whiskey In The Jar (sometimes spelt Whisky) is a compilation album by Irish rock band Thin Lizzy, originally released in 1996, covering the early part of the band's career. There are various versions of this album, released by different record companies, with the same track listing but with different covers.

This album should not be confused with the many other Thin Lizzy compilation albums of the same name, with different track listings.

== Track listing ==
- All tracks written by Phil Lynott unless stated.
1. "Whiskey in the Jar" (Trad. arr. Lynott, Eric Bell, Brian Downey) – 5:47
2. "Sarah" [Version 2]* – 2:51
3. "The Rocker" (Lynott, Bell, Downey) – 5:15
4. "Look What the Wind Blew In" – 3:28
5. "Return of the Farmer's Son" (Lynott, Downey) – 4:18
6. "Old Moon Madness" – 3:57
7. "Buffalo Gal" – 5:34
8. "Broken Dreams" (Lynott, Bell, Downey) – 4:29
9. "Vagabond of the Western World" – 4:46
10. "Black Boys on the Corner" – 3:27
11. "Mama Nature Said" – 4:54
12. "Here I Go Again" – 3:56
13. "Little Darling" – 2:59
14. "Dublin" – 2:31
15. "Shades of a Blue Orphanage" – 7.06
16. "Remembering, Pt. 2 (New Day)" (Lynott, Bell, Downey) – 5.05

* This version of "Sarah" is the remixed track from The Continuing Saga of the Ageing Orphans album, with a different guitar solo from the original.

== Personnel ==
- Phil Lynott – bass guitar, vocals, acoustic guitar
- Eric Bell – guitars
- Brian Downey – drums, percussion
- Gary Moore – guitar, backing vocals on "Little Darling" and guitar on "Sarah"

with

- Jan Schelhaas – organ on "Mama Nature Said"

== Certifications ==
| Region | Certification | Certified units/sales |
|---|---|---|
| United Kingdom (BPI) | Silver | 60,000^{^} |
^{^} Shipments figures based on certification alone.
