= A.i. (band) =

American rock-electroclash band

A.i. is a three-piece rock-electroclash band based from Los Angeles, California. The band consists of Nick Young (vocals/guitar), Zack Young (drums/percussion), and Milen Kirov (keyboards/synth bass). In September 2007, A.i. released their second album titled "Sex & Robots" independently. In October 2019, A.i. released their new album titled "The Series".

== Present ==
“The idea of Sex & Robots is the essence of A.i.,” attests Milen (Mee-LEN) Kirov, the group's keyboardist and synth bassist. “Sex represents us, the human, the desire, passion and instinct to make music; robots represent our instruments, the electronics, and the technology that allows us to express ourselves.”

A.i. stands for "artificial intelligence," a retro-futuristic concept now woven into the daily fabric of our lives. A.i., the band, is living that post-Space Age wet dream, commingling the analog and the digital, the organic and the synthetic, the muscle and the machine.

“A.i. is first and foremost a rock band”, says drummer Zack Young, “but electronic drums and synthesizers are an integral part of our sound." Zack's setup consists of a traditional rock drumset mixed with electronic triggers which allow him to perform live. “We play everything in the moment without using sequencers or backing tracks. That's one of the things that has always made A.i. special.”

Rich Mouser, who worked with Chris Vrenna on A.i.'s first album Artificial Intelligence, co-produced, engineered and mixed Sex & Robots at his studio, the Mouse House [Altadena, Calif.]. “Rich has equipment dating back to the ‘60s and totally cutting-edge stuff we didn’t have when we recorded our first album. He’s got timpani’s and ‘80s drum machines,” Zack continues. Says Milen: “At one point he pulled out this mini-Moog from the ‘70s that is so delicate he has to push a button with a Q-tip to keep it in tune.” Nick relates: “I recently had this dream that Rich was at the mixing board and all the knobs had turned into Silly Putty, and he was shaping our sound.” Those sounds inspired much of their songwriting.

== Background ==
In 2002, the band signed with DreamWorks Records and released their debut self-titled album, produced by Nine Inch Nails drummer Chris Vrenna. The album was made along with keyboardist/synth bassist Pablo Manzarek, son of The Doors keyboardist Ray Manzarek.

Since the release of their first album, Manzarek was replaced by keyboardist/synth bassist Milen Kirov. A.i.'s music is classified as electronic rock, fit for both the rock and dance club. Their follow-up album Sex&Robots was released in September 2007. Music runs in the family of founding members Nick and Zack Young. Their great uncle, Joe Young, was one of the founders of ASCAP in 1914 and one of the great songwriters of Tin Pan Alley. He wrote over 500 songs including such hits as Al Jolson's “My Mammy”, “I’m Sittin’ on Top of the World”, “Dinah”, “Five Foot Two, Eyes of Blue”, and Frank Sinatra's “You’re My Everything”.

The Young boys began making music in the family room-turned-studio of their childhood home. “I was playing bass and drums by the time I was 11,” Zack informs. “Nick had a guitar, so we naturally started jamming.” Adds Nick, “We even played sitar and tablas for a while.” Then, when Zack was 13, he became the bassist for Bad4Good – a band of kids produced by guitarist Steve Vai. “We cut a whole record at Steve’s studio and then we toured the country opening for acts such as Bon Jovi and Joe Satriani.” he says.

A.i. was formed when Zack was still a teen. The band signed with DreamWorks Records, released their debut album Artificial Intelligence in 2002, hit the road in support of the record – and lost their keyboardist the night before a gig in Detroit. “He just didn’t like being on the road,” Nick explains. “But the show must go on.” They were opening for Money Mark and had one of his bandmates join them on stage and help carry on the tour. After Nick and Zack got back to Los Angeles, they had three weeks to find a keyboardist to perform with at CMJ in New York. With a week left to go, Milen entered the scene.

“We weren’t looking for someone permanent,” Zack says. “But then this magical connection happened and the three of us started writing together.” At the time, Milen was a student at the California Institute of the Arts (CalArts) working on a bachelor's degree in piano performance (he just finished his master's degree in composition). But he'd been playing keyboards and synth bass in rock bands since he was a kid, both in his native Bulgaria and in the US.

Originally from Plovdiv – the second-largest city in Bulgaria (and a thriving arts center situated on the Maritsa River) – he, too, has music in his genes. “My parents are both teachers and performers of Bulgarian folk music and my brother is a drummer,” Milen notes. “I started playing the piano when I was three. I went to a music high school and then to a conservatory. I performed recitals, competed in piano competitions, and won some awards, but at the same time I was also interested in rock music.” He continues:

“I started playing in clubs when I was 13. I was in one band that was pretty big in Bulgaria – we toured and were on the radio and in the newspapers.” Most recently, Milen recorded piano on “Wish Upon A Dog Star,” Perry Ferrell’s single off his new album.

With Milen in place, A.i. began working on new songs. “The chemistry and spontaneity were amazing,” Zack says. “Milen really expanded the A.i. vision and the three of us started to become very good friends.”

In 2004, A.i. composed the score for “Human Error,” directed by Nick and Zack's father, Robert M. Young. Also that year, Nick toured as the singer for Tweaker, the brainchild of drummer/producer/remixer Chris Vrenna, who co-founded and played drums for years with Nine Inch Nails and produced A.i.’s first album.

“Tweaker’s music is very dark and dramatic,” Nick illuminates, “and while I was working with them I started thinking about my vocals in a more expressive way. I realized that I had a lot more range and strength in my voice than I’d been using, and after the tour, I started writing songs to capitalize on that. Then Rich Mouser took it further, encouraging me to take risks.”

“One of the most surreal experiences I’ve had was playing guitar for Yoko Ono and Sean Lennon at a festival in LA,” he remembers. “We’ve been fortunate enough to work with some great artists that we admire and learn from.”

The band's current DIY approach dates back to the early days of the band. In an August 22 article published by MTV.com, the boys played a few shows around L.A., but they concentrated more on putting together a demo, which, "somehow," found its way to David Geffen's house. That led to producer Rick Rubin (Red Hot Chili Peppers, Johnny Cash) dropping by to check them out. "I had no idea that all these record labels were all right around our house," Nick said. "At first it was really scary, because all these people start coming over to see you and you think, 'What do I have that all these people want? Maybe I should protect it.'"
