= Rococo (band) =

- Origin: London, England
- Genres: Hard rock, Rock, Progressive rock, Alternative rock
- Years active: 1970–1981, 2007
- Labels: Deram, Mountain, Angel Air
- Members: Ian Raines, Roy Shipston, Clive Edwards, Rod Halling and Tym Scopes.

Rococo were a London-based English progressive rock band, initially operating in the 1970s. They had three singles released in that decade. The band re-formed in the 21st century and have had five albums released, three on Angel Air Records.

== Career ==
Always leaning towards the alternative, underground rock scene, they also promoted their own gigs, appeared at the Windsor Free Festival and the anti-Establishment hippy community centre, The Warehouse in Twickenham, but also worked through the Chrysalis agency, which led them to support Ten Years After at London's Rainbow Theatre. Other bands they worked alongside in the 1970s included Thin Lizzy, Ian Dury and the Blockheads, Shakin' Stevens and the Sunsets, Climax Chicago Blues Band, Curved Air and Genesis

Rococo built up a devoted following and featured Ian Raines (lead vocals), Roy Shipston (keyboards/vocals), Rod Halling (guitar/vocals), Clive Edwards (drums) and John "Rhino" Edwards on bass guitar. Disguised as The Brats, they inadvertently became involved in the vanguard of the punk rock movement.

They appeared in the finals of a Melody Maker contest in 1974, using their pseudonym, and advertised in Melody Maker the prizewinners' final at The Round House as "The Brats plus 12 support acts". Consequently, the organisers deemed not to declare them winners, although they took most of the major prizes.

They released three singles: "Ultrastar" (b/w "Wildfire") on Deram Records in 1973; "Follow That Car" (b/w "Lucinda (Flint n'Tinder Love)") through Mountain Records in 1976; and "Home Town Girls" (b/w "Quicksilver Mail") under another pseudonym, Future, on a small independent record label in 1981.

Rococo re-formed in the 21st century with the original line-up, apart from John "Rhino" Edwards, and have had three CD albums released on Angel Air Records: Run from the Wildfire (SJPCD337); The Firestorm and Other Love Songs (SJPCD370) and, in October 2014, Losing Ground (SJPCD437).

The band's third studio album, Run from the Wildfire, was described by AllMusic as "hard hitting but melodic throughout".

== Band members ==
=== Recent ===
- Ian Raines – lead vocals, bass guitar
- Roy Shipston – keyboards, lead vocals, backing vocals
- Clive Edwards – drums, percussion
- Rod Halling – guitar, backing vocals
- Tym Scopes – guitar
- James Fox – bass guitar, backing vocals

=== Past ===
- John Edwards – bass guitar
- Steve Carman – bass guitar
- Gary Harvey – bass guitar
- Richard Stevens – lead vocals

=== Guest performers ===
- Chris Thompson – lead vocals
- Charlie Morgan – drums
- David Paton – bass guitar
- Cliff Lake - guitar
- Ronnie Johnson – guitar
- Alan Townsend – backing vocals
- Alice Spring – backing vocals
- Alice Raines – backing vocals
- Emily Raines – backing vocals

== Discography ==
=== Albums ===
- The Living Rock (Flopidiscs 2003)
- Hoodlum Fun (Flopidiscs 2003)
- Run From The Wildfire (Angel Air Records 2010)
- The Firestorm and Other Love Songs (Angel Air Records 2011)
- Losing Ground (Angel Air Records 2014)
- Angel Air releases produced by Ray Hendriksen and Roy Shipston

=== Singles ===
- "Ultrastar" / "Wildfire" (Deram 1973)
- "Follow That Car" / "Lucinda (Flint n'Tinder Love)" (Mountain Records 1976)
- "Home Town Girls" / "Quicksilver Mail" (Paro 1981, under the name "Future")
