= Wild Horses (British band) =

British rock band (1978–1981)

- Origin: London, England
- Genre: Hard rock
- Years active: 1978–1981
- Labels: EMI, Zoom Club, Krescendo, Rock Candy
- Spinoffs: Stampede
- Past members: Jimmy Bain; Brian Robertson; Kenney Jones; Jimmy McCulloch; Neil Carter; Dixie Lee; Clive Edwards; John Lockton; Laurence Archer; Reuben Archer; Frank Noon

Wild Horses were a British rock band, active from 1978 to 1981.

== History ==
Wild Horses was formed in the summer of 1978 by ex-Thin Lizzy guitarist Brian Robertson and ex-Rainbow bassist Jimmy Bain. At an early stage, the line-up featured former Stone the Crows and Wings guitarist Jimmy McCulloch and former Small Faces drummer Kenney Jones but eventually stabilized with the addition of drummer Clive Edwards (ex-Pat Travers, Uli Roth) and guitarist/keyboardist Neil Carter (ex-Wilder, Gilbert O'Sullivan). This line-up recorded the Trevor Rabin-produced eponymous album in 1980, released by EMI who signed the band after their 1979 Reading Festival appearance.

Carter left the band in August 1980, after the band's UK tour with Ted Nugent, to join UFO and later Gary Moore. His replacement was guitarist John Lockton (ex-Next Band, Red Alert) whose first appearance was on the band's Japanese tour in the autumn of 1980 followed by the release of the Stand Your Ground album in the spring of 1981.

In June 1981, Robertson and Edwards both left Wild Horses following the band's Paris Theatre show in London. Robertson teamed up with Motörhead a year later and recorded Another Perfect Day in 1983, before moving on to join fellow Scotsman Frankie Miller on the Dancing in the Rain album in 1986. Edwards continued with a number of different acts, including Bernie Marsden's S.O.S., Grand Prix, and Lionheart.

Bain assembled a new Wild Horses line-up featuring Lockton, former Lautrec stepfather and son team, Reuben (vocals) and Laurence Archer (guitar), and The Def Leppard E.P. credited drummer Frank Noon. The Archers and Noon left only months later and went on to form their own band, Stampede, and Wild Horses ceased to exist, with Bain joining his former Rainbow bandmate Ronnie James Dio in Dio, while Lockton became a member of German hard rockers Victory.

Wild Horses members Laurence Archer and Clive Edwards were part of the UFO line-up that recorded the High Stakes & Dangerous Men and Lights Out in Tokyo albums in the early 1990s, before spending time in Medicine Head. After being involved with the reformed Stampede, Archer and Edwards launched X-UFO in the summer of 2011 along with Rocky Newton and Danny Peyronel.

Both Wild Horses and Stand Your Ground have seen repeated reissues over the years, the first coming in 1993 via EMI-Toshiba Japan as part of the 'Legendary Masters' series. European reissues, including various bonus tracks, followed in 1999 (Zoom Club), 2009 (Krescendo), and 2013 (Rock Candy).

On 25 February 2014, a bootleg-quality Wild Horses live album titled Live In Japan 1980, recorded at the band's Nakano Sun Plaza, Tokyo gig on 29 October 1980, was issued via Krescendo. The same recording had first surfaced in 2012 as a Japanese bootleg titled Heavy Ride.

== Members ==
- Jimmy Bain – bass guitar, vocals, guitar, keyboards (1978–81; died 2016)
- Brian Robertson – guitar, vocals, keyboards (1978–81)
- Kenney Jones – drums (1978)
- Jimmy McCulloch – guitar (1978; died 1979)
- Neil Carter – guitar, vocals, keyboards (1978–80)
- Dixie Lee – drums (1978–79)
- Clive Edwards – drums (1979–81)
- John Lockton – guitar (1980–81)
- Laurence Archer – guitar (1981)
- Reuben Archer – vocals (1981)
- Frank Noon – drums (1981)

== Discography ==
=== Studio albums ===
- Wild Horses (EMI, 1980 / Toshiba-EMI/Insideout, 1993 / Zoom Club 1999 / Krescendo 2009 / Rock Candy, 2013)
- Stand Your Ground (EMI, 1981 / Toshiba-EMI/Insideout, 1993 / Zoom Club 1999 / Krescendo, 2009 / Rock Candy, 2013)

=== Live albums ===
- Live In Japan 1980 (Krescendo, 2014)

=== UK singles ===
- "Criminal Tendencies" / "The Rapist" (EMI, 1979)
- "Face Down" / "Dealer" (EMI, 1980)
- "Flyaway" / "Blackmail" (EMI, 1980)
- "I'll Give You Love" / "Rocky Mountain Way" (live) (EMI, 1981)
- "I'll Give You Love" / "Rocky Mountain Way" (live) / "The Kid" / "Saturday Night" (live) (EMI, 1981 - double single pack)
- "Everlasting Love" / "The Axe" (EMI, 1981)

=== Japan singles ===
- "Face Down" / "Dealer" (EMI, 1980)
- "Fly Away" / "The Rapist" (EMI, 1980)

== See also ==
- List of new wave of British heavy metal bands
- Wild Horses, an actively touring band out of Grand Rapids, Minnesota climbing their way up the charts
