= Clive Edwards =

English drummer

- Born: 19 January 1953 (age 73); Hounslow, Middlesex, England
- Genres: Hard rock Rock
- Instrument: Drums
- Years active: 1973 – present

Clive Edwards (born 19 January 1953) is a drummer, who is best known as a former member of the British band, UFO (from August 1989 to June 1993). He also featured on the Bronz second album Carried By The Storm released on 1 January 2010.

== Career ==
Clive Edwards is probably best known for playing with hard rock bands that have included outstanding guitarists, such as Pat Travers, Brian Robertson, former Thin Lizzy & (Wild Horses) member, Uli Jon Roth of the Scorpions (band) & (Electric Sun), Bernie Marsden of Whitesnake, John Cale from The Velvet Underground, Dennis Stratton, ex Iron Maiden, and Laurence Archer of Medicine Head, and UFO. He is now playing with Lionheart (UK band), HOUSE OF X with live shows for Frankie Miller, Full House with Ray Minhinnett, Kossoff 'The Band Plays On' with Terry Slesser, and Bucket & Co with Dave Colwell of Bad Company.

There are also many other projects beyond hard rock, including collaborations with Academy Award winner Hans Zimmer, Zaine Griff, and Sally Oldfield.

Edwards has played on many albums, most famously the acclaimed UFO albums High Stakes & Dangerous Men, Headstone, Lights Out in Tokyo Live, and the legendary Uli Roth Earthquake. Edwards started playing at an early age and formed a band with Ian Raines while they were in school together, called Stallion. They appeared on a BBC Television show for Schools and later became Rococo. A lot of this early information can be found on the Rococo website. After the Rococo recordings, Clive has gone on to recorded and performed with HOUSE OF X, UFO, X-UFO, LOUDER LIFE LEAGUE, Bronz, Wild Horses, Pat Travers, Phil Lynott, Dave Stewart, Annie Lennox, John Cale, Ollie Halsall, Micky Moody, Bernie Marsden's SOS, Chris Thompson, Lionheart, Uli Jon Roth, Electric Sun, Neil Merryweather and Grand Prix. The full list of recordings seen here can be found on Clive's own web pages. Playing live concerts during 2018 with bands: Kossoff the Band Plays On, Frankie Miller's Full House, House of X, Lionheart, & Zaine Griff. New for 2019, there will be shows and an album with the new Pete Way Band to look forward to, as well as recordings for The Members & Toyah Willcox. Brand new Lionheart album 'Reality of Miracles' for 2020.

== Discography ==
=== Screaming Lord Sutch ===
- Jack The Ripper (1975)

=== Rococo ===
- Ulta Star (1973)
- The Living Rock (1975)
- Hoodlum Fun (1976)
- Run from the Wildfire (2002)
- The Firestorm and other Love songs (2011)
- Losing Ground (2012)

=== Pat Travers Band ===
- BBC 1 Live In Concert (1977)

=== Neil Merryweather ===
- Differences (1978)

=== Filthy McNasty ===
- Live - A Week at the Bridge E16 (1978)

=== Uli Jon Roth - Electric Sun ===
- Earthquake (1979)
- Electric Sun Compilation (1988)
- Uli Jon Roth - From Here To Eternity (1998)
- Electric Sun - Earthquake re-mastered (2023)

=== Wild Horses ===
- Wild Horses (1980)
- Stand Your Ground (1981)
- Wild Horses BBC In Concert 1981
- Wild Horses – Live In Japan 1980 (2014)

=== Zaine Griff ===
- Tonight (1979)
- Mood Swings (2016)
- The Helden Project//Spies (2022)
- A Double Life (2024)

=== John Cale ===
- For Your Neighbour's Wife (Live from Eindhoven Stadium June 21, 1980)

=== Bernie Marsden's SOS ===
- Reading Rock Volume One (1982)
- The Friday Rock Show Sessions (1982)

=== Lionheart ===
- Unearthed - Raiders Of The Lost Archives (comp.) (1999)
- Second Nature (2017)
- Mary Did You Know (2018)
- Reality of Miracles (2020)
- The Grace of a Dragonfly (2024)

=== Bronz ===
- Carried by the Storm 1985

=== Laurence Archer ===
- Laurence Archer - L.A. (1986)

=== UFO ===
- UFO - Headstone (1983)
- UFO High Stakes & Dangerous Men (1992)
- UFO Lights Out In Tokyo Live (1992)
- UFO Live TNT - UFO (1994)
- UFO Doctor Doctor (1995)
- UFO The X-Factor: Out There & Back (1998)
- UFO Then and Now (2002)
- UFO One of Those Nights: The Anthology (2006)
- UFO - High Stakes & Dangerous Men - Lights Out in Tokyo (2024)

=== X-UFO ===
X-UFO Vol. 1 The "LIVE" Files (2012)

=== HOUSE OF X ===
- House of X (2014)

=== John'Rhino'Edwards ===
- Just Sayin (2024)

=== Toyah ===
- In the Court of the Crimson Queen re-imagined (2019)

=== The Members ===
- Versions (2019)

=== The Sharpeez ===
- Live at Leo's (2020)

=== Crawling Spider ===
- A Tribute to Mike Montgomery Vol.1 The LA Sessions (2020)

=== James Holkworth Conspiracy ===
- Solo in Sodom (2020)
- Salmon mousse blues (2021)

=== Compilations ===
- Guitar Legends
- Metal Gods (2005)
- Metal Mania
- The History of Rock
- Metal
- Sudden Impact (Italian metal compilation)

=== Videography ===
- U.F.O. - The Story Of U.F.O. - Too Hot To Handle DVD
