= Do Anything You Want To =

- UK single sleeve featuring (l–r): Moore, Gorham, Lynott and Downey

Single by Thin Lizzy

from the album Black Rose: A Rock Legend
- B-side: "Just the Two of Us"
- Released: 8 June 1979 (UK)
- Genre: Hard rock
- Length: 3:51
- Label: Vertigo
- Songwriter: Phil Lynott
- Producers: Tony Visconti and Thin Lizzy

Thin Lizzy singles chronology
"Waiting for an Alibi" (1979)	"Do Anything You Want To" (1979)	"Got to Give It Up" (1979)

Official video
- "Do Anything You Want To" on YouTube

"Do Anything You Want To" is a song by the Irish hard rock band Thin Lizzy. It was the second single released from their 1979 album Black Rose: A Rock Legend. It was recorded at Pathe Marconi EMI Studios in Paris, France.

== Composition ==
The song opens with an African-style drum beat by Brian Downey, which gives way to a twin-guitar melody characteristic of Thin Lizzy's harmonics. The lyrics employ rhyme and alliteration-- such as in the first three lines which include the words: 'investigate', 'insinuate', 'intimidate', 'complicate', 'wait', 'hesitate', 'state', 'fate' and 'awaits.' The song fades out with lead singer Phil Lynott impersonating Elvis Presley. Guitarist Scott Gorham suggested: "I think he just wanted to use his American accent there."

== Critical reception ==
Upon its release as a single, Cliff White of Smash Hits believed that the Black Rose album track "S & M" would have made a "far stronger A-side" than the "pleasantly pounding" "Do Anything You Want To", but he added that it "sounds familiar enough to be guaranteed some sort of chart placing". Jim Whiteford of the Kilmarnock Standard said: "The hypnotic melodic guitars are topped by Lynott's round and reliable vocals to prepare another chart cert."

== Chart performance and video ==
The single reached No. 14 in the UK singles chart and remained in the chart for nine weeks. It reached No. 25 in Ireland, charting for two weeks. An accompanying video was filmed at Molineir Studios, directed by David Mallet. Mallet said that the video cost £12–15,000 to film adding: "Most of the shoots I did with Lizzy back then only lasted a day... maybe eight or ten hours worth of footage". The video was the band's first attempt at a short film rather than a simple video of a band performance. The video featured Hot Gossip dancers Perri Lister, Dominique Wood and Carole Fletcher.

== Subsequent releases ==
This track has been featured on several Thin Lizzy compilation albums including: The Adventures of Thin Lizzy released in 1981, Dedication: The Very Best of Thin Lizzy released in 1991, and Wild One: The Very Best of Thin Lizzy released in 1996. It was subsequently included on the Vagabonds Kings Warriors Angels box set in 2001, as well as the Greatest Hits and Definitive Collection set.

"Just the Two of Us," (the single's B-side) is a Lynott/Gorham composition that was not included on the Black Rose album. It was only available as part of the single until the release of Vagabonds Kings Warriors Angels.

== Personnel ==
- Phil Lynott – bass guitar, lead vocals
- Scott Gorham – lead and rhythm guitar
- Gary Moore – lead and rhythm guitar
- Brian Downey – drums

== Charts ==
Chart (1979)	Peak position
Ireland (IRMA)	25
UK Singles (Official Charts)	14
