= Bad4Good =

Heavy metal band

- Bad4Good (from left to right) Zack Young, Danny Cooksey, Thomas McRocklin, and Brooks Wackerman

Background information
- Origin: United States
- Genres: Hard Rock
- Years active: 1991–1992
- Label: Interscope
- Past members: Danny Cooksey; Zack Young; Thomas McRocklin; Brooks Wackerman

Bad4Good was a heavy metal band formed in 1991 by guitarist Steve Vai. The band was a quartet of teenagers, the oldest of whom was 16. The group consisted of guitarist Thomas McRocklin, bassist Zack Young, drummer Brooks Wackerman, and singer Danny Cooksey.

Under Vai's guidance, the band released one album in 1992 called Refugee. The only single released was a cover of the Phil Lynott song "Nineteen" and it failed to chart but the music video was featured on MTV for some time. They also went on to tour briefly with Damn Yankees. After the band disbanded, Wackerman went on to play drums for Bad Religion, and now for Avenged Sevenfold, Young plays drums for the band AI, and Cooksey has had a successful career as a voice-over artist and also returned to his roots to play in Los Angeles country and western bands. Prior to the band's formation, McRocklin appeared in the music video for Vai's 1990 song "The Audience is Listening", playing Vai as a child.

== Band members ==
- Danny Cooksey – lead vocals
- Thomas McRocklin – lead guitar
- Zack Young – bass guitar, backing vocals
- Brooks Wackerman – drums

== Discography ==
- Refugee (1992)

== See also ==
- List of glam metal bands and artists
