= Wild Horses (Wild Horses album) =

Studio album by Wild Horses
- Released: 14 April 1980
- Recorded: December 1979 – January 1980
- Studio: Konk Studios, Hornsey, London
- Genre: Hard rock
- Length: 36:43
- Label: EMI
- Producer: Trevor Rabin, Wild Horses

Wild Horses chronology
Wild Horses (1980)	Stand Your Ground (1981)

Singles from Wild Horses
- 1. "Criminal Tendencies" / "The Rapist" Released: 1979; 2. "Face Down" / "Dealer" Released: 1980; 3. "Flyaway" / "Blackmail" Released: 1980

Professional ratings
Review scores
Source	Rating
AllMusic	2/5 stars
Collector's Guide to Heavy Metal	6/10

Wild Horses is the debut studio album by the British rock band, Wild Horses, co-produced with Trevor Rabin at Konk Studios in London, and released on 14 April 1980 on EMI Records. It peaked at No. 38, and spent four weeks in the UK Albums Chart.

It was subsequently issued on CD in Japan in 1993 on Toshiba-EMI, and by the now defunct UK labels Zoom Club in 1999 and Krescendo Records in 2009, respectively, both with the title The First Album. The most recent re-issue came in February 2013, courtesy of UK-based Rock Candy Records, and includes a host of unreleased studios demos as bonus tracks not found on previous re-issues.

== Track listing ==
All songs by Jimmy Bain and Brian Robertson, except where noted

Side one

1. "Reservation" - 3:47
2. "Face Down" - 3:30
3. "Blackmail" - 2:25
4. "Flyaway" (Bain, Phil Lynott) - 3:33
5. "Dealer" (Bain, Robertson, Scott Gorham) - 4:56

Side two

6. "Street Girl" - 3:28
7. "No Strings Attached" - 3:56
8. "Criminal Tendencies" - 3:46
9. "Nights on the Town" - 3:21
10. "Woman" - 4:01

=== Zoom Club re-issue bonus tracks ===
11. "Rocky Mountain Way" (Joe Walsh, Joe Vitale, Rocke Grace, Kenny Passarelli) - 4:33 (live in Osaka, Japan)
12. "Saturday Night" (Eddie Floyd, Steve Cropper) - 7:20 (live in Osaka, Japan)

=== Krescendo re-issue bonus tracks ===
11. "The Axe" (live from BBC 'In Concert', 1981)
12. "In the City" (live from BBC 'In Concert', 1981)
13. "New York City" (live from BBC 'In Concert', 1981)

=== Rock Candy re-issue bonus tracks ===
11. "The Rapist" - 3:37 (B-side of "Criminal Tendencies" single)
12. "Reservation" (demo) - 4:22
13. "Blackmail" (demo) - 2:41
14. "Flyaway" (demo) - 3:12 (featuring Phil Lynott)
15. "Dealer" (demo) - 4:49
16. "The Rapist" (demo) - 3:38
17. "Retribution" (demo) - 5:22
18. "Breathe on Me" (demo) - 5:51

== Personnel ==
Wild Horses

- Brian Robertson - lead guitars, backing and lead (3, 9) vocals, bass (4, 9), arrangements
- Neil Carter - lead guitars, backing vocals, keyboards
- Jimmy Bain - bass (1–3, 5–8, 10), lead vocals (1, 2, 4–8, 10), rhythm guitars, keyboards, arrangements
- Clive Edwards - drums

Production

- Trevor Rabin - producer
- John Rollo - engineer

== Release history ==
Date	Region	Label	Catalogue	Format	Notes
14 April 1980	Worldwide	EMI Records	EMC3326	vinyl	
1980	Japan	Toshiba-EMI	EMS-81315	vinyl	
1993	Japan	Toshiba-EMI/Insideout	TOCP-7975	CD	
1999	UK	Zoom Club	ZCRCD22	CD	with the title The First Album
2009	UK	Krescendo	KRECD32	CD	with the title The First Album
2013	UK	Rock Candy	CANDY168	CD	
