= High Stakes & Dangerous Men =

Studio album by UFO
- Released: February 1992
- Recorded: August–December 1991
- Studio: Livehouse Studios, Cornwall; Studio 125, Burgess Hill; Black Barn Studios, Woking; Wessex Studios and Ezzee Studios, London
- Genre: Hard rock, heavy metal
- Length: 52:51
- Label: Razor/Castle (Europe); Victor (Japan)
- Producer: Kit Woolven

UFO chronology
Ain't Misbehavin' (1988)	High Stakes & Dangerous Men (1992)	Walk on Water (1995)

Professional ratings
Review scores
Source	Rating
AllMusic	4/5 stars
Collector's Guide to Heavy Metal	4/10
The Encyclopedia of Popular Music	3/5 stars

High Stakes & Dangerous Men is the thirteenth album by British hard rock band UFO, released in February 1992. It is the only UFO studio album to feature guitarist Laurence Archer and drummer Clive Edwards, both former members of Wild Horses.

== Track listing ==
All songs written by Laurence Archer, Phil Mogg, and Pete Way, except where indicated.

No.	Title	Writer(s)	Length
1.	"Borderline"		5:17
2.	"Primed for Time"		3:22
3.	"She's the One"		3:44
4.	"Ain't Life Sweet"	Archer, Clive Edwards, Mogg, Way	3:42
5.	"Don't Want to Lose You"		5:37
6.	"Burnin' Fire"		4:02
7.	"Running Up the Highway"		4:39
8.	"Back Door Man"		5:06
9.	"One of Those Nights"		4:11
10.	"Revolution"		4:06
11.	"Love Deadly Love"		4:53
12.	"Let the Good Times Roll"		4:12

Japanese edition bonus track
No.	Title	Writer(s)	Length
13.	"Long Gone"	Paul Chapman, Mogg	4:59

== Personnel ==
UFO

- Phil Mogg – lead vocals
- Laurence Archer – guitar, backing vocals
- Pete Way – bass
- Clive Edwards – drums

Additional musicians

- Don Airey – keyboards
- Terry Reid, Stevie Lange – backing vocals

Production

- Kit Woolven – producer, engineer, arrangements with UFO
