= Lionheart (British band) =

British rock band

- Origin: London, England
- Genres: Hard rock, heavy metal
- Years active: 1980–1986, 2016–present
- Labels: CBS, Pony Canyon, King, Metalville
- Members: Dennis Stratton; Steve Mann; Rocky Newton; Clive Edwards; Lee Small
- Past members: Frank Noon; Jess Cox; Reuben Archer; Les Binks; Chad Brown; Andy Beirne; Phil Lanzon; Keith Murrell
- Website: lionheart-music.com

Lionheart is a British hard rock band formed in late 1980, originally featuring singer Jess Cox (ex-Tygers of Pan Tang), guitarist Dennis Stratton (ex-Iron Maiden), guitarist/keyboardist Steve Mann (ex-Liar, later with MSG, Michael Schenker and Eloy), and bassist/vocalist Rocky Newton (ex-The Next Band, Wildfire), and drummer Frank Noon (ex-The Next Band, Def Leppard). The band split up in 1986 but reformed in 2016 with a line-up featuring Stratton, Mann, Newton, plus vocalist Lee Small (Shy and Phenomena) and Clive Edwards (ex-UFO and Wild Horses) on drums.

== History ==
=== Formation to breakup ===
Lionheart made their debut one Saturday night at the Marquee Club in London but musical differences ended with Cox leaving the band replaced by former Lautrec frontman, Reuben Archer. Former Judas Priest drummer Les Binks replaced the Wild Horses-bound Noon for the 1981 UK tour with Def Leppard with former Wild Horses drummer Clive Edwards eventually replacing Binks. Archer, too, briefly spent time in Wild Horses before forming Stampede with his step son, guitarist Laurence Archer, Noon, and bassist Colin Bond.

The song "Lionheart", recorded by Reuben Archer, Dennis Stratton, Steve Mann, Rocky Newton, and Frank Noon belatedly surfaced on the Heavy Metal Heroes Vol. 2 (Heavy Metal Records) compilation in 1982. That track remains the only representative recording of the band's early sound, as they changed their style significantly.

A demo recorded by the core of Stratton, Mann, and Newton landed Lionheart a deal with the American branch of CBS Records in 1984. Enlisting new vocalist Chad Brown and securing the studio services of Leo Sayer band drummer Bob Jenkins, the band proceeded to record their debut album, Hot Tonight, with record producer Kevin Beamish (REO Speedwagon, Starship) at Sound City Studios in Los Angeles, California. This was a slick AOR-styled effort that failed to capture the old fans' interest or that of their target audience in the United States.

In 1985 the band continued with former Grand Prix members, drummer Andy Bierne and keyboardist Phil Lanzon, appearing on Channel 4's popular ECT program. Lanzon eventually left to join the reformed Sweet (and later Uriah Heep), while Brown gave way to new vocalist Keith Murrell (ex-Airrace).

=== Breakup ===
Failing to make any headway, Lionheart split up in 1986. Bierne went into management, Murrell fronted Irish rock group, Mama's Boys, and Newton and Mann joined the McAuley Schenker Group. Dennis Stratton later found success in Japan as part of an all-star Praying Mantis touring line-up alongside former Iron Maiden bandmate Paul Di'Anno.

=== Interregnum ===
Steve Mann signed on with Sweet as the guitarist/keyboardist in late 1989, replacing his former Lionheart bandmate Lanzon. Mann stayed on into the mid 1990s when he was invited by Frank Bornemann, owner of Horus Sound Studio in Hannover, Germany to play guitar and some keyboards for his band Eloy, completing a line-up that consisted of Klaus-Peter Matziol on bass, Michael Gerlach on keyboards, and Bodo Schopf (ex-McAuley Schenker Group, Sweet) on drums. Mann guested on both The Tides Return Forever and Ocean 2: The Answer and also took part in a tour of Germany.

Unearthed – Raiders of the Lost Archives, a 30-song collection of Lionheart demos, was issued in 1999 by Pony Canyon in Japan.

=== Reunion ===
Lionheart appeared on Saturday 22 October 2016, third in a seven-act line-up headlined by Steelheart at the three-day Rockingham 2016 melodic/hard rock festival, held in Nottingham, United Kingdom.

Following the Rockingham event, the band decided to continue working together, with further live performances planned and a new album, entitled Second Nature, released in Japan in June 2017 on King Records and in Europe in August 2017 on AOR Heaven, followed by a mini tour in Japan. Arrangements for release in other territories are under discussion. The album was mainly recorded at Steve Mann's Flying Vivaldi Studio in Germany, with other parts recorded by Dennis Stratton, Lee Small and Rocky Newton in the UK.

Lionheart appeared at the Sweden Rock festival in June 2017. The band toured the UK with Airrace in November and December 2017.

In November 2023 it was announced that Lionheart would perform at Firefest Festival (10 Years After) to be held in the UK at Manchester Academy on 11-13 October 2024. The band performed on the Friday night, the first night of the festival.

== Members ==
=== Current ===
- Dennis Stratton – guitar (1980–1986, 2016–present)
- Rocky Newton – bass, vocals (1980–1986, 2016–present)
- Steve Mann – guitar, keyboards (1980–1985, 1986, 2016–present)
- Clive Edwards – drums (1982–1983, 2016–present)
- Lee Small – lead vocals (2016–present)

=== Former ===
- Frank Noon – drums (1980–1981)
- Jess Cox – lead vocals (1980)
- Reuben Archer – lead vocals (1980–1983
- Les Binks – drums (1981–1982; died 2025)
- Chad Brown – lead vocals (1984–1985)
- Robert Jenkins – drums (1984–1985)
- Andy Bierne – drums (1985–1986)
- Phil Lanzon – keyboards (1985–1986)
- Keith Murrell – lead vocals (1986)

== Discography ==
- Hot Tonight (1984)
- Unearthed – Raiders of the Lost Archives (1999)
- Second Nature (2017)
- The Reality of Miracles (2020)
- The Grace of a Dragonfly (2024)
