= Stampede (band) =

British hard rock band

- Origin: London, England
- Genres: Hard rock, heavy metal
- Years active: 1981–1983; 2009–present
- Labels: Polydor, Rock Candy
- Members: Reuben Archer; Laurence Archer; Chris Clowsley; Rob Wolverson; Colin Bond; Steve Greystone
- Past members: Frank Noon; Alan Nelson; Eddie Parsons; Mark Stanway

Stampede are a British hard rock band formed in 1981 by songwriting partnership Reuben Archer and Laurence Archer. The band signed to Polydor Records, emerging as part of the new wave of British heavy metal scene. Stampede disbanded in 1983, and guitarist Laurence Archer went on to play with UFO and Phil Lynott's Grand Slam, amongst other projects. The band reformed 26 years later in 2009, and a new studio album titled A Sudden Impulse was released on 9 May 2011 on the Grind That Axe label, a subsidiary of Rock Candy Records.

== History ==
=== Pre-Stampede (Lautrec, Lionheart & Wild Horses) ===
Stampede emerged from the partnership of Reuben Archer (vocalist, songwriter) and stepson Laurence Archer (guitarist, songwriter). Their first major project being the 1977 hard rock band Lautrec, for which they recruited Steve Holbrook of Frome on keyboards, and Simon Riddler of Shepton Mallet on bass. The drummer was Clive Deamer of Frome, who later played in Portishead and Robert Plant's Strange Sensation, as well as session work for many other important projects.

Prior to a Saxon support tour, Deamer left to finish an apprenticeship and was replaced by Steve Jones. The band completed two support tours with Saxon and released a single on the Street Tunes Label: "Shoot Out the Lights" / "Mean Gasoline", now reputed to be one of the rarest 45s of the NWOBHM era. auctioning on eBay for £1800.

In 1980, with no major deal in place, Reuben joined Lionheart, a new supergroup headed by ex-Iron Maiden guitarist Dennis Stratton. Within four months with no record deal in the offing, Reuben took the offer to join Wild Horses with Jimmy Bain, late of Rainbow. The band required a guitarist to partner John Lockton and a new drummer, so Reuben suggested Laurence Archer on guitar and Frank Noon of Lionheart on drums. This completed the final line-up of Wild Horses. However, the project never took off and a disillusioned Reuben, Laurence and Frank left to form Stampede. They recruited Alan Nelson (ex-Wildfire) on keyboards and Bristol-based bass player Colin Bond (formerly of Stormtrooper) to complete the original Stampede line-up.

=== Stampede (1981–1983) ===
==== Days of Wine & Roses EP and The Official Bootleg (1981–1982) ====
Under management from Roulette Music and with an advance from Polydor Records, Stampede went into Cave Studios in Bristol to record six tracks. The tracks were taken up by Polydor Records who consequently signed the band in 1981 for a major deal, immediately releasing four of the new tracks on an EP called Days of Wine and Roses.

The band continued to play residencies at the London Marquee Club and various other venues in and around London, and were booked for the Mildenhall and Reading Festivals of 1982. Before these festival dates, drummer Frank Noon left Stampede to join Bernie Tormé, and was replaced by Bristol-based Eddie Parsons who stayed with the band until the end. Prior to the Festivals, Reuben broke his hip and left thigh running to catch a bus with Iron Maiden's Bruce Dickinson, and only just made it out of hospital to appear onstage at the festivals on crutches. Prior to the Mildenhall Festival, Stampede decided to remain a four piece when keyboardist Alan Nelson left to pursue other things. It was felt that Bond's bass style and Taurus pedals more than filled out the sound, and that was how the band remained until their demise.

Polydor recorded the Mildenhall and Reading Festival sets of 1982 putting the live album out as Stampede: The Official Bootleg.

Between 1982 and 1983, Stampede also recorded a BBC show for Tommy Vance, a Capital Radio show with four tracks for Fluff Freeman's Rock Show, and a BBC In Concert show at the Paris Theatre with contemporaries Girlschool.

==== Hurricane Town and "The Other Side" (1983) ====
In 1983, Stampede followed up the Official Bootleg with a studio album, entitled Hurricane Town, recruiting Magnum's Mark Stanway for keyboard duties. At this time Polydor also released a 7" single called "The Other Side".

Hurricane Town was promoted by a support tour with Gary Moore, before which the band went off to Portugal to play a week’s residency as warm up for the tour, which was extended after the Christmas of 1983.

== Disbandment ==
After Hurricane Town a second studio album was scheduled and Stampede commenced writing material, however, when singer Reuben returned to hospital to have all the metalwork removed from his hip and thigh, he caught a virus during the operation and became seriously ill. Due to this and the fact that rock and metal were having a hard time due to the onslaught of punk and new wave, plus with little support from Polydor, Stampede decided to split.

Reuben formed his own design company and Colin Bond went off to work with Meat Loaf, while Laurence joined Phil Lynott and Mark Stanway in Grand Slam. When Lynott died Laurence joined Brit rockers UFO, before retiring from music to work in the film industry.

== Reunion ==
In 2006, Rock Candy Records re-released Stampede's last studio offering Hurricane Town (originally released by Polydor Records in 1983). The album consisted of all the original tracks re-mastered, and four bonus tracks from the Lautec catalogue, and featured a 16-page colour booklet with sleeve notes by journalists Malcolm Dome, Dante Bonutto and Derek Oliver, along with a foreword by Reuben Archer.

On 2 January 2009, Reuben called Colin Bond and Laurence Archer with a view to reunite Stampede, and the first gig was staged at London's Embassy Club in Mayfair on 25 May 2009. After several gigs they made the unanimous decision to commence recording a new album. This was easier said than done as it soon transpired that the availability of each band member was impossible to schedule, and when Laurence became unavailable during a period in the recording schedule due to work commitments, Reuben brought in guitarists Rob Wolverson and Chris Clowsley to finish the job. Laurence and Reuben had written and recorded five tracks; and Reuben with Wolverson and Clowsley along with original bassist Colin Bond and new drummer Steve Graystone, completed the album. The album, entitled A Sudden Impulse was recorded at Track 21 Studios in Weston-super-Mare, Dartington Hall Studios in Devon, and Mad Hat Studios in Wolverhampton. With the new album nearly completed Stampede's first live appearance was in 2010 at Birmingham's Meltdown Festival where they were main support to headliner Blaze Bayley. The new album was released on Rock Candy Records on 9 May 2011 to critical acclaim, the single "Having Fun" being released a month prior to the album.

Stampede have since completed live dates throughout 2011, including Festival appearances at Devon Rox in Exeter and Hard Rock Hell V in Prestatyn, and were scheduled to record the second comeback album for release in 2012. Such a recording has yet to appear. On 29 September 2012 in Wolverhampton, Stampede played at the Denim and Leather NWOBHM festival at the Slade Rooms alongside Praying Mantis, Weapon, Gaskin and Agincourt.

== Current members ==
- Reuben Archer (vocals)
- Laurence Archer (lead guitar)
- Chris Clowsley (guitar)
- Rob Wolverson (guitar)
- Colin Bond (bass)
- Steve Graystone (Drums)

Stampede today consists of original founding members Reuben and Laurence Archer and Colin Bond, along with new additions Chris Clowsley (guitar) and drummer Stevie G (Steve Graystone). In 2010, during the recording of new studio album A Sudden Impulse, Laurence became unavailable for recording for a period of time due to work commitments. As a result, the band brought in guitarist Rob Wolverson for outstanding writing and recording duties.

== Discography ==
- Days of Wine and Roses (EP 1982) - (Polydor Records)
1. "Days of Wine and Roses"
2. "Moving On"
3. "Photographs"
4. "Missing You"
- The Official Bootleg (Live album 1982) - (Polydor Records)
1. "Missing You"
2. "Moving On"
3. "Days of Wine and Roses"
4. "Hurricane Town"
5. "Shadows of the Night"
6. "Baby Driver"
7. "The Runner"
8. "There and Back"
- Hurricane Town (Studio album 1983) - (Polydor Records)
1. "I've Been Told"
2. "Love Letters"
3. "Casino Junkie"
4. "The Other Side"
5. "Turning in Circles"
6. "Hurricane Town"
7. "Girl"
8. "The Runner"
9. "Mexico"
- "The Other Side" - 7" Single 1983 - (Polydor Records)
1. "The Other Side"
2. "The Runner"
- Hurricane Town - Re-mastered & re-released studio album (2006) - (Rock Candy Records)
1. "I've Been Told"
2. "Love Letters"
3. "Casino Junkie"
4. "The Other Side"
5. "Turning in Circles"
6. "Hurricane Town"
7. "Girl"
8. "The Runner"
9. "Mexico"
10. "Midnight at the Moulin Rouge" (Lautrec - bonus track)
11. "Red Light Ruby" (Lautrec - bonus track)
12. "Mean Gasoline" (Lautrec - bonus track)
13. "Shoot Out the Lights" (Lautrec - bonus track)
- A Sudden Impulse (Studio album 2011) - (Grind That Axe/Rock Candy Records)
1. "Send Me Down an Angel"
2. "Jessie"
3. "Having Fun"
4. "Make a Change"
5. "Hard Rock Hell"
6. "This Road"
7. "Homeward Bound"
8. "Shame on You"
9. "Natural Disaster"
10. "Humble Pie"
11. "Flaming Gold"
12. "Recharged" (bonus track)
13. "Flaming Gold" - Acoustic version (bonus track)

== See also ==
- List of new wave of British heavy metal bands
