= Danny Cooksey =

American actor (born 1975)

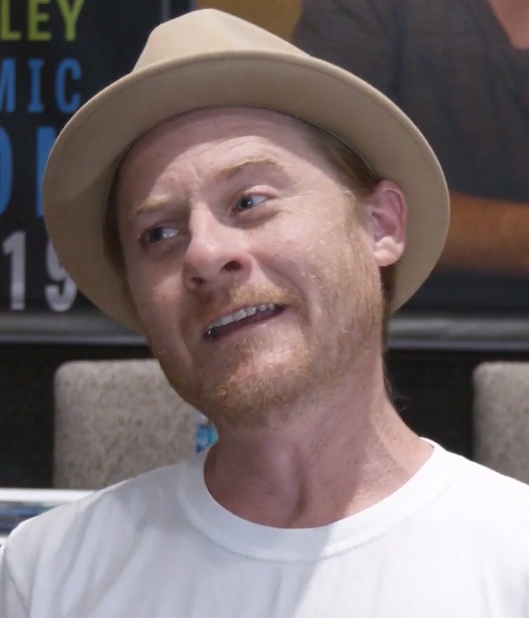
- Cooksey in 2019
- Born: Daniel Ray Allen Cooksey Jr. November 2, 1975 (age 51); Moore, Oklahoma, U.S.
- Occupations: Actor; musician
- Years active: 1983–present
- Spouse: Amber Cooksey (m. 1998; div. 2019)
- Children: 2

Danny Cooksey (born November 2, 1975) is an American actor and musician. He is best known for his roles in films, television, voice work, and other media such as Diff'rent Strokes (during the final three seasons), The Cavanaughs, and Salute Your Shorts, his role as a friend to the young John Connor in Terminator 2: Judgment Day, and as the voice of Montana "Monty" Max in Tiny Toon Adventures, as well as voice roles in projects such as 101 Dalmatians: The Series, Xiaolin Showdown, Dave the Barbarian, and the DC Animated Universe series Static Shock.

== Early life ==
Cooksey was born in Moore, Oklahoma, the son of Melody Ann (née Wagoner) and Daniel Ray Allen Cooksey. When Cooksey was eight years old, his mother moved to Los Angeles with the intention of him pursuing a career in country music.

== Career ==
=== Acting ===
Cooksey auditioned successfully for Diff'rent Strokes, being cast as Sam McKinney, a role he played for the last three seasons. He also played Kevin Cavanaugh in The Cavanaughs, Bobby Budnick in Salute Your Shorts, John Connor's friend Tim in Terminator 2: Judgment Day, the title character in The Further Adventures of SuperTed, Montana Max in Tiny Toon Adventures, Mooch in 101 Dalmatians: The Series, Milo Kamalani on Pepper Ann, Jack Spicer in Xiaolin Showdown, and the title character in Dave the Barbarian. He also lent his voice to the Kids' WB animated series Static Shock as Francis Stone/Hotstreak. In 1996, Cooksey provided the voice of Stoop Kid from Hey Arnold!

=== Music ===
Cooksey was the lead singer in the band Bad4Good. They released one CD, Refugee, for Interscope Records in 1992. He was also a member of Lucy's Milk in 1996, He is the most prominent member of the band Arbuckle (2004–2013). In 2015, Cooksey worked with the Western band Shelter Dogs, providing guitar and vocals, releasing the album Take Me Home in March 2015, all the tracks being written or co-written by Cooksey.

== Personal life ==
In 1998, Cooksey married makeup artist Amber Leigh, who has epilepsy. The couple have two children together: a daughter, Zoe, and a son, Jackson, who also has epilepsy. In 2019, Leigh filed for divorce.

== Filmography ==
Film
Year	Title	Role	Notes
1988	Mac and Me	Jack Jr.	
1991	Terminator 2: Judgment Day	Tim	
1992	Mom and Dad Save the World	Alan Nelson	
2012	The Lorax	Brett, Chett	Voice
2017	Hey Arnold!: The Jungle Movie	Stoop Kid	Voice, television film<ref>Snierson, Dan (13 June 2016). "Hey Arnold movie: Nickelodeon [sic] announces title, 19 original actors returning". Entertainment Weekly. Archived from the original on 13 February 2021.</ref

Television
Year	Title	Role	Notes
1983	The Dukes of Hazzard	Terry Lee	Episode: "A Boy's Best Friend"
1984–86	Diff'rent Strokes	Sam McKinney	48 episodes
1985	The Twilight Zone	Little Boy	Episode: "Act Break/The Burning Man/Dealer's Choice"
1986	Mr. Belvedere	Tommy Sullivan	Episode; "The Play"
1986	Riptide	Jordan Bernbaum	Episode: "Dead Men Don't Floss"
1986	MacGyver	Darin Cooper	Episode "Eagles"
1986	A Smoky Mountain Christmas	Jasper	Television film
1986	Foofur	Bogey	Voice, episode: "The Last Resort"
1986–87	Pound Puppies	Casey, Tiny, Mervin	Voice, 3 episodes
1986–89	The Cavanaughs	Kevin Cavanaugh	26 episodes
1987	Werewolf	Davey Harris	Episode: "The Boy Who Cried Werewolf"
1987	Growing Pains	New Ben	Episode: "This Is Your Life"
1987	Little Clowns of Happytown	Big Top	17 episodes
1987	The Little Troll Prince	Bu - the Little Troll Prince	Voice
1988	The Completely Mental Misadventures of Ed Grimley	Wendell Malone	Voice, 13 episodes
1988	Superman	George	Voice, episode: "Cybron Strikes/The First Day of School"
1989	ABC Weekend Special	P.J. Funnybunny	Voice, episode: "P.J. Funnybunny"
1989	The Further Adventures of SuperTed	SuperTed	Voice, English dub
1990	Bill & Ted's Excellent Adventures	Deacon Logan	Voice, episode: "Model 'T' for Ted"
1990–92	Tiny Toon Adventures	Montana Max	Voice, 20 episodes
1991–92	Salute Your Shorts	Robert "Bobby" Budnick	26 episodes
1992	The Idiot Box	Jared Huggins, Prank Caller	3 episodes
1992	The Plucky Duck Show	Montana Max	Voice, 3 episodes
1992	Nick Arcade	Himself	Celebrity contestant; 1 episode
1992, 1994	The Little Mermaid	Urchin	Voice, 5 episodes
1993–94	The Ren & Stimpy Show	Victor	Voice, 3 episodes
1994	Are You Afraid of the Dark?	Josh Dugan	Episode: "The Tale of the Guardian's Curse"
1994; 1996	ABC Afterschool Special	Jake / Todd	2 episodes
1996	Hey Arnold!	Stoop Kid	Voice, episode: "Stoop Kid"
1997–98	101 Dalmatians: The Series	Mooch	Voice, 15 episodes
1997–2001	Pepper Ann	Milo Kamalani	Voice, 65 episodes (106 segments)
1998	Oh Yeah! Cartoons	Lord Amur Jr., Pogo	Voice, episode: "Fat Head"
1999	The Wild Thornberrys	Wanuug	Voice, episode: "Polar Opposites"
2000–04	Static Shock	Francis Stone / Hotstreak	Voice, 11 episodes
2001	As Told by Ginger	Lifeguard	Voice, episode: "The Right Stuff"
2001–03	Invader Zim	Keef, Melvin, Dirge, additional voices	Voice, 5 episodes
2001; 2006–07	What's with Andy?	Peter Lik	Voice
2003	Ozzy & Drix	Shane	Episode: "Puberty Alert"
2003	Rocket Power	Production Assistant	Voice, episode: "Reggie's Big (Beach) Break"
2003–05	Kim Possible	Jake	Voice, 2 episodes
2003–06	Xiaolin Showdown	Jack Spicer	Voice, 52 episodes
2004	Lloyd in Space	Zoopy	Episode: "Go, Crater Worms"
2004–05	Dave the Barbarian	Dave the Barbarian, various voices	Voice, main role
2007	El Tigre: The Adventures of Manny Rivera	Django of the Dead	Episode: "The Good, the Bad, and El Tigre"
2008–09	The Secret Saturdays	Paul Cheechoo	Voice, 3 episodes
2009	Phineas and Ferb	Thaddeus	Voice, episode: "Thaddeus and Thor"
2010	G.I. Joe: Renegades	Snake Eyes	Voice, episode: "Return of the Arashikage"
2010	Pound Puppies	Yipper, Joey Wald, additional voices	Voice, 7 episodes
2010–12	Kick Buttowski: Suburban Daredevil	Brad Buttowski	Voice, 43 episodes
2011–12; 2014	Kung Fu Panda: Legends of Awesomeness	Peng, Villager #2, Thug #1	Voice, 3 episodes
2014–15	Regular Show	Stan, Yoga Instructor, Officer Glenn, Reggie	Voice, 2 episodes
2021	Long Gone Gulch	Snag	Voice

Video games
Year	Title	Voice role
2003	Arc the Lad: Twilight of the Spirits	Maru
2003	Need for Speed: Underground	Additional voices
2005	Medal of Honor: European Assault	Additional voices
2005	Quake 4	Anderson
2006	24: The Game	Additional voices
2006	Xiaolin Showdown	Jack Spicer
2007	Meet the Robinsons	Emperor Stanley
2007	Medal of Honor: Airborne	Additional voices
2009	MadWorld	Leo Fallmont
2009	Stormrise	Coop, Ranger Soldier
