= Stand Your Ground (Wild Horses album) =

Studio album by Wild Horses
- Released: May 1981
- Recorded: Good Earth Studios and Maison Rouge Studios, London
- Genre: Hard rock
- Length: 41:22
- Label: EMI
- Producer: Kit Woolven, Jimmy Bain, Brian Robertson

Wild Horses chronology
Wild Horses (1980)	Stand Your Ground (1981)

Singles from Stand Your ground
- 1. "I'll Give You Love" / "Rocky Mountain Way (live)" Released: 1981; 2. "Everlasting Love" / "The Axe" Released: 1981

Professional ratings
Review scores
Source	Rating
AllMusic	3/5 stars
Collector's Guide to Heavy Metal	7/10
Sounds	4/5 stars

Stand Your Ground is the second and final studio album by British rock band Wild Horses, co-produced with Kit Woolven at Good Earth and Maison Rouge Studios in London and released in May 1981 on EMI Records.

It was subsequently issued on CD in Japan in 1993 on Toshiba-EMI, and by the now defunct UK labels Zoom Club in 1999 and Krescendo Records in 2009, respectively. The most recent re-issue came in February 2013, courtesy of UK-based Rock Candy Records, and includes several bonus tracks not found on previous re-issues.

== Track listings ==
All songs by Jimmy Bain and Brian Robertson, except where noted

Side one

1. "I'll Give You Love" - 3:44
2. "In the City" - 4:44
3. "Another Lover" - 3:26
4. "Back in the U.S.A.* - 3:50
5. "Stand Your Ground" - 3:36

Side two

6. "The Axe" - 4:20
7. "Miami Justice" - 5:00
8. "Precious" - 4:36
9. "New York City" - 3:26
10. "Stake Out" - 3:40

*Not to be confused with the Chuck Berry song of the same name.

=== Zoom Club re-issue bonus tracks ===
11. "The Rapist" - 3:34
12. "The Kid" - 3:12

=== Krescendo re-issue bonus tracks ===
11. "Everlasting Love" (live from BBC 'In Concert', 1981)
12. "I'll Give You Love" (live from BBC 'In Concert', 1981)
13. "Stakeout" (live from BBC 'In Concert', 1981)
14. "Stand Your Ground" (live from BBC 'In Concert', 1981)

=== Rock Candy re-issue bonus tracks ===
11. "The Kid" - 3:15 (B-side of "I'll Give You Love" single)
12. "Everlasting Love" (Buzz Cason, Mac Gayden) - 2:26 (1981 non-album single)
13. "Because I Care" (demo) - 5:36
14. "Are You Ready" (Brian Downey, Scott Gorham, Phil Lynott, Robertson) (demo) - 2:40
15. "The Kid" (demo) - 3:16
16. "Saturday Night" (Eddie Floyd, Steve Cropper) - 4:33 (live in Osaka, Japan; B-side of "I'll Give You Love" single)
17. "Rocky Mountain Way" (Joe Walsh, Joe Vitale, Rocke Grace, Kenny Passarelli) - 7:20 (live in Osaka, Japan; B-side of "I'll Give You Love" single)

== Personnel ==
White Horses

- Jimmy Bain - vocals, bass, rhythm guitar, keyboards, producer, arrangements
- Brian Robertson - guitars, keyboards, backing vocals, producer, arrangements
- John Lockton - guitars
- Clive Edwards - drums

Production

- Kit Woolven - producer, engineer, arrangements
- Dave Bascombe, Gordon Fordyce, Chris Porter - assistant engineers

== Release history ==
Date	Region	Label	Catalogue	Format
May 1981	Worldwide	EMI Records	EMC3368	vinyl
1993	Japan	Toshiba-EMI/Insideout	TOCP-8084	CD
1999	UK	Zoom Club	ZCRCD23	CD
2009	UK	Krescendo	KRECD33	CD
2013	UK	Rock Candy	CANDY169	CD
