= Thomas McRocklin =

English guitarist, songwriter, and producer

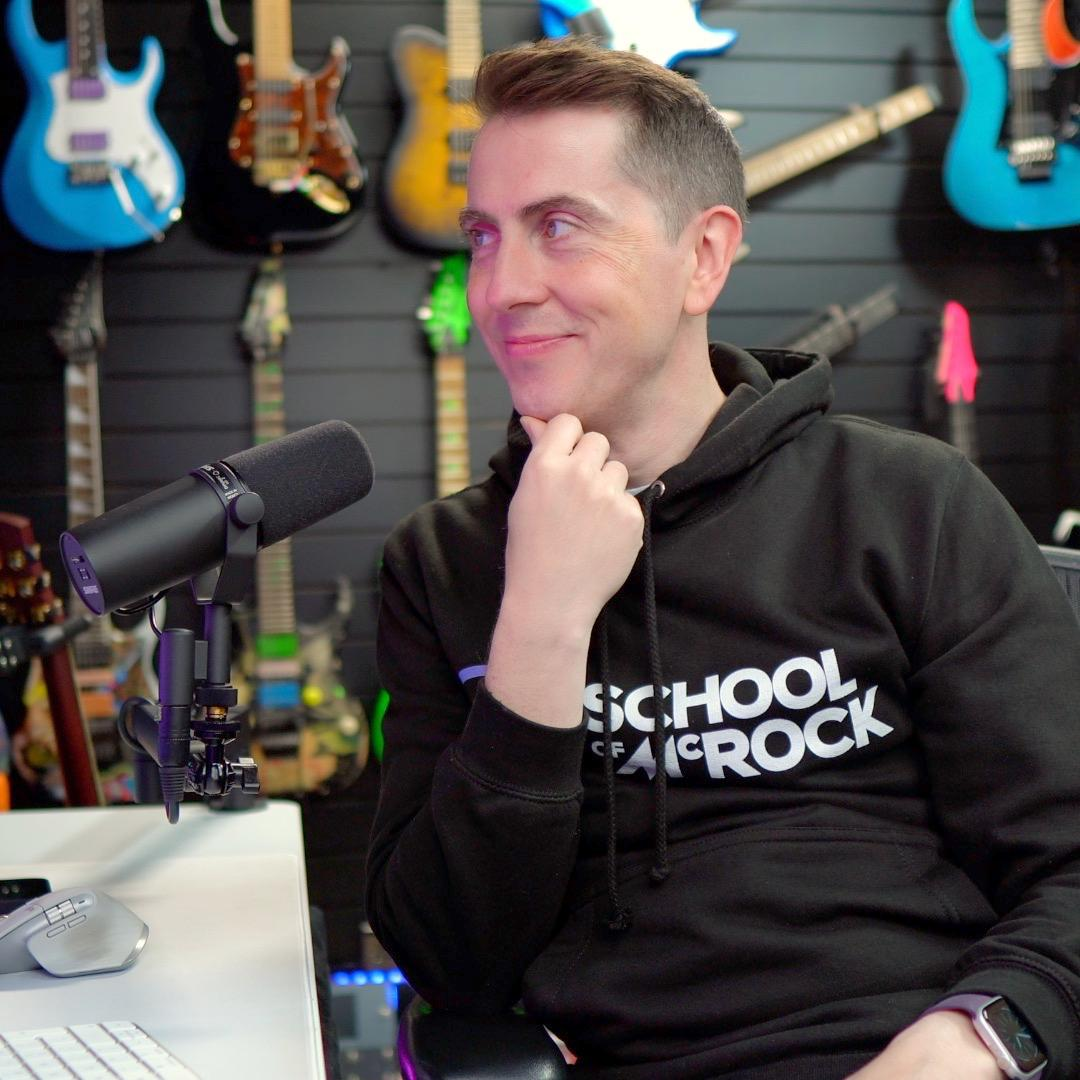
- Thomas McRocklin in studio

Background information
- Also known as: McRocklin
- Born: Thomas McLaughlin; 20 September 1979 (age 46); Newcastle upon Tyne
- Origin: UK
- Instrument(s): Guitar, bass, keyboards
- Website: mcrocklin.com

Thomas McLaughlin (born 20 September 1979), better known by his stage name McRocklin, is an English guitar player, music producer and mastering engineer. He came to prominence as an electric guitarist in the 1980s.

== Biography ==
McRocklin started playing the guitar at the age of four. At the age of eight he performed live on stage, opening for Ozzy Osbourne.

He performed in the music video for Steve Vai's 1990 single "The Audience Is Listening" from Vai's album Passion and Warfare, and was subsequently gifted the custom-made Ibanez Universe guitar which Vai had used on the album.

At the age of 11 McRocklin featured in the Warner Bros. documentary Legends of the Guitar, presented by Jeff "Skunk" Baxter.

In 1991 he was recruited to play lead guitar in the all-teenage band Bad4Good, which was set up by Vai.

After returning to the UK, he released his own solo album 91–95 and later teamed up with Tim Hutchinson to form the band McRocklin & Hutch, which supported DragonForce on the UK leg of their 2019 "Extreme Power Metal" tour.

In 2023 McRocklin launched the software company PolyChrome DSP, specialising in music-editing computer plug-ins.

== Equipment ==
List of McRocklin's main equipment
Category	Brand	Type
Guitar	Kiesel Guitars	Zeus; Aries; Delos; Type X; Osiris; HD6; Leia; MCR6X Signature
Pickups	Fishman	Fishman Fluence Signature Series Tosin Abasi; Fishman Fluence Classic Humbucker; Fishman Fluence Signature Series McRocklin
Amplifier	Victory Amps	Sheriff 22 Head
Amplifier	Boss	KATANA-AIR
Effects	Horizon Devices	Precision Drive
Effects	Boss	Line Selector LS-2
Effects	Bogner	Harlow
Load Box	Boss	WAZA Tube Amp Expander

== Endorsements ==
McRocklin has become an artist for brands including:

- Eventide
- Fishman
- Ibanez
- Kiesel Guitars
