= Brian Downey =

Brian Downey may refer to:

- Brian Downey (actor) (born 1944), Canadian actor
- Brian C. Downey (1950–2012), Canadian politician
- Brian Downey (drummer) (born 1951), Irish drummer
