= Nineteen (Phil Lynott song) =

1985 song by Phil Lynott

Single by Phil Lynott
- B-side: "Nineteen" (dub mix)
- Released: 11 November 1985
- Length: 5:29 (full version); 3:30 (single edit); 5:27 (dub mix)
- Label: Polydor
- Songwriter: Phil Lynott
- Producer: Paul Hardcastle

Phil Lynott singles chronology
"Out in the Fields" (1985)	"Nineteen" (1985)	"King's Call" (1987)

Music video
- "Nineteen" on YouTube

"Nineteen" is a song by Irish singer and musician Phil Lynott, released by Polydor Records on 11 November 1985 as a solo single. The song was written by Lynott and produced by Paul Hardcastle. It reached number 76 in the UK singles chart and remained in the top 100 for four weeks.

== Writing ==
Lynott wrote "Nineteen" about the "aggression of [being] the age of nineteen". He was inspired to write the song after a night out in a bar in Texas, where he observed a Hells Angels biker with "19" tattooed on his arm and walk up to the bar and say, "I'm bad, gimme a beer". Lynott told the Sunderland Echo in 1985: "When the Angel banged his fist [on the bar] you could feel a tremendous amount of aggression."

"Nineteen" was originally intended for Lynott's new band Grand Slam, who demoed the song and toured the UK with it as part of their set list in 1984. However, the band failed to secure a record deal and split up in 1985. The original demo recording first surfaced on the 2002 release The Studio Sessions. Live recordings have been included on a number of Grand Slam releases, including Live 1984 (2003), Twilight's Last Gleaming (2003) and Glasgow Kiss (2008).

== Recording ==
After Grand Slam's split, Lynott signed a new record deal as a solo artist with Polydor Records and recorded "Nineteen" as a solo single. He approached Paul Hardcastle to produce the song as he wanted to experiment and try a different production approach, feeling that "heavy metal productions" had generally become "very bland" and similar sounding. Lynott had also been interested in the pairing of rock and dance music, and knew Hardcastle could add a dance element to the song and create a dance mix. Lynott stated in 1985: "With people like Eddie Van Halen working with Michael Jackson and ZZ Top doing dance mixes and stuff like that, I thought it would be interesting if [Hardcastle] put some sort of dance mixes to a hard rock song."

Hardcastle recalled about working with Lynott to Classic Rock in 2016: "He was a hero of mine – I couldn't work out why he wanted to work with me. He said to me, 'You're at the top of your game technically right now, so can you help me?'" In a 1985 interview with Sunday People, Hardcastle said: "It was great to do a hard rock track. I loved it." Lynott enjoyed working with Hardcastle and was also impressed by his skills as a keyboardist. He revealed to the Evening Despatch in 1985: "He's young, very enthusiastic, and we got on great as musicians and friends. The whole thing just seemed to work very well."

During the recording of the song, Lynott and Hardcastle borrowed a motorbike from a nearby shop in order to record the revving noises heard on the track.

== Release ==
"Nineteen" was released in the UK on 7-inch and 12-inch formats on 11 November 1985. A limited edition 7–inch release with an extra single containing a live version of "Whiskey in the Jar" by Thin Lizzy was released a week later on 18 November. "Nineteen" received airplay on BBC Radio 1. It reached its peak at number 76 in its debut week on the UK singles chart. The single was to have been followed by a new single in January 1986 and then a studio album due for potential release in March 1986, but Lynott died from heart failure and pneumonia in January 1986. After his death, "Nineteen" re-entered the chart at number 100 for a single week.

== Music video ==
The song's music video was filmed over a three day period in Hollywood, Los Angeles with an approximate budget of $50,000. Lynott described it as "very macho without being chauvinistic". Some of the bikers in the video were genuine bike gang members and others were extras, including Twisted Sister bassist Mark Mendoza.

== Promotion ==
In addition to the song's music video, Lynott carried out a number of TV appearances in the UK and Europe to promote the single. He mimed the song on the Norwegian show Kanal 1, broadcast on 29 November 1985. His last televised interview was with Dante Bonutto for Music Box and his last public appearance was on the 1985 Christmas Special of ITV's Razzmatazz, which was filmed on 17 December and broadcast on 23 December. To mime the song on the show, Lynott was accompanied by Robin George on guitar and former Thin Lizzy bandmate Brian Downey on drums.

== Critical reception ==
Upon its release, Jerry Smith of Music Week said that Lynott and Hardcastle had "created a memorable mixture of styles" on the "hard rock number" which, with Robin George's "blistering guitar work", is "sure to be successful". Martin Townsend, writing for Number One, stated that Lynott had "turn[ed] in the rawest rock-dance track since Run-DMC" and added it is "destined to be chopped in and out of hip-hop tracks, nationwide". Adrian Smith of Iron Maiden, as guest reviewer for Kerrang!, liked the song but was not convinced it was single material. He said: "It's not very immediate, I dunno, [it] could be [a hit]. I hope so."

Ronnie Randall of Sounds gave a mixed review, describing it as a "racy skid-a-long of the sort that Chris Spedding used to do so well, but Phil spouts a few too many clichéd riffs". Gavin Martin of the NME was negative in his review, calling it Lynott's "perennial teenage warrior fantasy". He wrote: "It taxes the credibility – Lynott is long past teenagedom and the only battles he has to fight are fruitless struggles to put rubbish like this into the chart."

== Track listing ==
7–inch single (UK)

1. "Nineteen" – 5:29
2. "Nineteen" (dub mix) – 5:27

7–inch single (UK limited edition extra single)

1. "Nineteen" – 5:29
2. "Nineteen" (dub mix) – 5:27
3. "Whiskey in the Jar" (recorded live in Eire 1978)

7–inch single (France, Germany, Spain, Australia and Japan)

1. "Nineteen" (7-inch edit) – 3:30
2. "Nineteen" (dub mix) – 5:27

12–inch single (UK, France, Germany, Spain, Australia and Japan)

1. "Nineteen" – 5:29
2. "Nineteen" (dub mix) – 5:27
3. "A Night in the Life of an Old Blues Singer" – 4:56

== Personnel ==
"Nineteen"

- Phil Lynott – vocals, bass
- Robin George – guitar
- Paul Hardcastle – keyboards

Production

- Paul Hardcastle – production ("Nineteen")
- Will Reid-Dick – production ("A Night in the Life of an Old Blues Singer")
- Phil Lynott – production ("A Night in the Life of an Old Blues Singer")

== Charts ==
Chart (1985)	Peak position
UK Singles (Official Charts)	76
UK Heavy Metal Singles (Spotlight Research)	6

== Cover versions ==
- In 1992, American heavy metal band Bad4Good released a version of "Nineteen" as a promotional single in the US from their only album Refugee. It reached number 53 on Radio & Records magazine's AOR Tracks chart based on the radio play it received. The accompanying music video achieved play on The Box and Street Beat.
