= Thunder and Lightning (album) =

Studio album by Thin Lizzy
- Released: 4 March 1983
- Recorded: Late 1982
- Studios: Lombard Sound, Dublin, Ireland; Power Plant, London, UK; Boathouse Studios, London, UK
- Genre: Heavy metal
- Length: 40:36
- Labels: Vertigo; Mercury (Canada); Warner Bros. (US)
- Producers: Thin Lizzy and Chris Tsangarides

Thin Lizzy chronology
Renegade (1981)	Thunder and Lightning (1983)	Life (1983)

Singles from Thunder and Lightning
- 1. "Cold Sweat" Released: 4 February 1983; 2. "Thunder and Lightning" Released: 29 April 1983; 3. "The Sun Goes Down" Released: 22 July 1983

Thunder and Lightning is the twelfth and final studio album by Irish hard rock band Thin Lizzy, released on 4 March 1983. Guitarist John Sykes was hired to replace Snowy White after 1981's Renegade, and Sykes helped to provide a heavier sound and guitar tone than Thin Lizzy had used on previous albums. However, the bulk of the songwriting (except for "Cold Sweat") was completed before he joined the band. Keyboard player Darren Wharton also offered a stronger musical influence to Thin Lizzy's final studio album, co-writing many of the tracks including "Some Day She Is Going to Hit Back", and the final single "The Sun Goes Down". A farewell tour followed the album's release, followed by the live album Life.

The group's co-founder, principal songwriter, frontman and bass player Phil Lynott died in 1986. While the group has reunited to tour on many occasions since 1994, they have consciously avoided recording any further albums out of respect for Lynott.

== Reception ==
Professional ratings
Review scores
Source	Rating
AllMusic	3/5 stars
Collector's Guide to Heavy Metal	10/10
Metal Hammer (GER)	5/7
Smash Hits	3/10

AllMusic's Greg Prato proclaimed Thunder and Lightning "a definite improvement" compared to much of their other output in the 1980s, but remarked that the record was not the "best release" by the band.

== Track listing ==
=== Original release ===
Side one
No.	Title	Writer(s)	Length
1.	"Thunder and Lightning"	Brian Downey, Phil Lynott	4:56
2.	"This Is the One"	Lynott, Darren Wharton	4:04
3.	"The Sun Goes Down"	Lynott, Wharton	6:20
4.	"The Holy War"	Lynott	5:12

Side two
No.	Title	Writer(s)	Length
5.	"Cold Sweat"	Lynott, John Sykes	3:06
6.	"Someday She Is Going to Hit Back"	Downey, Lynott, Wharton	4:05
7.	"Baby Please Don’t Go"	Lynott	5:10
8.	"Bad Habits"	Scott Gorham, Lynott	4:04
9.	"Heart Attack"	Gorham, Lynott, Wharton	3:39

The limited edition double LP and cassette version of the album adds four tracks, recorded live in Britain while Snowy White was still a member of the band.

No.	Title	Writer(s)	Length
5.	"Emerald"	Gorham, Brian Robertson, Downey, Lynott
6.	"Killer on the Loose"	Lynott
12.	"The Boys Are Back in Town"	Lynott
13.	"Hollywood (Down on Your Luck)"	Gorham, Lynott

=== 2013 deluxe edition ===
In 2013, a deluxe edition of the album was released. It consisted of two discs: disc one included the original release, and disc two contained live recordings from a 1981 Hammersmith Odeon show and a number of demos.

No.	Title	Writer(s)	Length
1.	"Angel of Death"	Lynott, Wharton	7:30
2.	"Don't Believe a Word"	Lynott	8:16
3.	"Emerald"	Gorham, Robertson, Downey, Lynott	4:17
4.	"Killer on the Loose"	Lynott	5:39
5.	"The Boys Are Back in Town"	Lynott	5:10
6.	"Hollywood (Down on Your Luck)"	Gorham, Lynott	4:37
7.	"The Sun Goes Down"	Lynott, Wharton	6:07
8.	"Bad Habits"	Gorham, Lynott	4:32
9.	"This Is the One"	Lynott, Wharton	4:21
10.	"Thunder and Lightning"	Downey, Lynott	4:58
11.	"Cold Sweat"	Lynott, Sykes	3:10
12.	"Baby Please Don't Go"	Lynott	5:38
13.	"Heart Attack"	Gorham, Lynott, Wharton	3:41
14.	"The Holy War"	Lynott	5:17
15.	"Someday She Is Going to Hit Back"	Downey, Lynott, Wharton	4:00

- Tracks 1–6 recorded live in 1981 at the Hammersmith Odeon, London, 27 November 1981.
  - Tracks 1–2 originally issued as B-sides on the "Cold Sweat" single.
  - Tracks 3–6 originally included as bonus tracks on double LP and cassette versions of the album.
- Tracks 7–15 are original album demo versions.

== Singles ==
- "Cold Sweat" / "Bad Habits" – 4 February 1983

A double single pack and 12" were also released, the other tracks being "Angel of Death" (live) / "Don't Believe a Word" (live).

- "Thunder and Lightning" / "Still in Love with You" (live) – April 1983

A 12" was also released, featuring the same two tracks and a poster.

- "The Sun Goes Down" / "Baby Please Don't Go" – July 1983

The B-side in the Netherlands was "Bad Habits".

- "The Sun Goes Down (Remix)" / "The Sun Goes Down (Extended)" / "Baby Please Don't Go" – 12" (1983)

== Personnel ==
=== Thin Lizzy ===
- Phil Lynott – bass guitar, lead vocals
- Scott Gorham – guitar, backing vocals
- John Sykes – guitar, backing vocals
- Darren Wharton – keyboards, backing vocals
- Brian Downey – drums, percussion

=== Production ===
- Chris Tsangarides – producer, engineer, mixing
- Andrew Warwick – engineer
- Chris Ludwinski – tape op, assistant engineer
- Ian Cooper – mastering at Townhouse Studios, London

== Charts ==
Chart (1983)	Peak position
Canada Top Albums/CDs (RPM)	42
Dutch Albums (Album Top 100)	40
Finnish Albums (The Official Finnish Charts)	29
Norwegian Albums (VG-lista)	10
Swedish Albums (Sverigetopplistan)	12
UK Albums (Official Charts)	4
US Billboard 200	159

== Certifications ==
Region	Certification	Certified units/sales
United Kingdom (BPI)	Silver	60,000^{^}
^{^} Shipments figures based on certification alone.
