= The Sun Goes Down (Thin Lizzy song) =

Single by Thin Lizzy

from the album Thunder and Lightning
- B-side: "Baby Please Don't Go"
- Released: 22 July 1983
- Genre: Rock
- Length: 6:19
- Label: Vertigo
- Songwriters: Darren Wharton, Phil Lynott
- Producers: Thin Lizzy & Chris Tsangarides

Thin Lizzy singles chronology
"Thunder and Lightning" (1983)	"The Sun Goes Down" (1983)	"Dedication" (1991)

"The Sun Goes Down" was a single released by Irish hard rock band Thin Lizzy, the last single to be released before they split in 1983. It is featured on the group's album from that year, Thunder and Lightning, and it has been referred to as a ballad.

== Television performances ==
On 26 January 1983, the song was performed live for the first time during a concert in Hitchin, which was broadcast simultaneously on television and radio for the BBC's "Sight and Sound in Concert". This show also marked the debut of guitarist John Sykes. Two days later, the band performed the song on the British TV music show The Tube, along with "Cold Sweat" and "The Boys Are Back in Town".

== Single ==
The song was written by Phil Lynott and Darren Wharton, and Lynott said at the time, "I think that one is a nice note to go out on. I can see it being played on the radio and fully believe it has great chart potential." The single entered the UK chart on 6 August 1983, reaching No. 52.

There was no official promotional video with the single as the record company had decided it was too expensive. The band began work on editing video clips of live performances to accompany the song but this was abandoned when it was clear that the single's chart performance did not merit the effort.

== Critical reception ==
Upon its release as a single, Neil Jeffries of Kerrang! praised "The Sun Goes Down" as a "marvellous swansong" and doubted the band "could have released a classier single". He also praised the remix of the single for "improv[ing] it still further", with the drums "pushed well to the fore" and "extra vocal and keyboard touches" added. Peter Martin of Smash Hits remarked that Thin Lizzy "sound incredibly like 10cc's 'I'm Not in Love' era" on what he considered to be "quite a palatable effort".

== Cover versions ==
German heavy metal band Sinner covered "The Sun Goes Down" on their 1998 album The Nature of Evil. They later covered the b-side to the single as well, "Baby Please Don't Go", on their Mask of Sanity album in 2007.

The song was also covered in 2009 by Jørn Lande (as Jorn) on his album Spirit Black and by Night Demon in 2022.

== Personnel ==
- Phil Lynott – bass guitar, lead vocals
- Scott Gorham – lead and rhythm guitar
- John Sykes – lead and rhythm guitar
- Brian Downey – drums
- Darren Wharton – keyboards

== Charts ==
Chart (1983)	Peak position
UK Singles (Official Charts)	52
