= Thunder and Lightning (Thin Lizzy song) =

1983 song by Thin Lizzy

Single by Thin Lizzy

from the album Thunder and Lightning
- B-side: "Still in Love with You" (live)
- Released: 29 April 1983
- Length: 4:54
- Label: Vertigo
- Songwriters: Phil Lynott; Brian Downey
- Producers: Thin Lizzy; Chris Tsangarides

Thin Lizzy singles chronology
"Cold Sweat" (1983)	"Thunder and Lightning" (1983)	"The Sun Goes Down" (1983)

"Thunder and Lightning" is a song by Irish rock band Thin Lizzy, released by Vertigo Records on 29 April 1983 as the second single from their twelfth and final studio album, Thunder and Lightning (1983). The song was written by band members Phil Lynott and Brian Downey, and was produced by Thin Lizzy and Chris Tsangarides. It reached number 22 in the Irish Singles Chart and number 39 in the UK singles chart.

== Critical reception ==
Upon its release as a single, "Thunder and Lightning" received mixed reviews. Chris Welch of Kerrang! considered it to be a "garbled, raucous racket on first hearing" but added it "grows on you after [further] plays". He did, however, believe the live B-side to be "altogether more interesting, musical and satisfying". Mark Page, writing for the Hartlepool Mail, called it a "real cracker" and "so heavy". Frank Edmonds of the Bury Free Press gave the song a 7.5 out of 10 rating and wrote, "A 90mph heavy metal thrash which is so noisy and loud it sounds more like Motörhead! Lizzy are really capable of far better." A reviewer for the Londonderry Sentinel stated that the band sound "more like Motörhead" on the track and felt the single was "worth having if only for the excellent live version on the B side". Robin Smith of Record Mirror was negative in his review, calling the song "as dismal as a wet day in Brighton, showing how Lynott became the toothless old grandad of heavy metal". He added that the single was "just about saved by the live B side".

== Track listing ==
7–inch single (UK)

1. "Thunder and Lightning" (edited version) – 3:19
2. "Still in Love with You" (recorded live at Hammersmith Odeon 10th March 1983) – 9:03

12–inch single (UK)

1. "Thunder and Lightning" – 4:54
2. "Still in Love with You" (live) – 9:03

== Personnel ==
Thin Lizzy

- Phil Lynott – bass guitar, lead vocals
- Scott Gorham – guitar, backing vocals
- John Sykes – guitar, backing vocals
- Darren Wharton – keyboards, backing vocals
- Brian Downey – drums, percussion

Production

- Thin Lizzy – production ("Thunder and Lightning")
- Chris Tsangarides – production ("Thunder and Lightning")
- Andrew Warwick – engineering ("Thunder and Lightning")
- Ian Cooper – mastering ("Thunder and Lightning")
- Darren Wharton – production (live version of "Still in Love with You")
- Will Reid Dick – engineering (live version of "Still in Love with You")

Other

- P. G. Brunelli – front cover photography
- Nick Milner of Zenith Lighting – back cover photography

== Charts ==
Chart (1983)	Peak position
Ireland (IRMA)	22
UK Singles (Official Charts)	39
UK Heavy Metal Singles (Spotlight Research)	4
