= Robbie Brennan =

Irish musician (1947–2016)

- Robbie Brennan in Grand Slam

Background information
- Born: 1947; Dublin, Ireland
- Died: April 12, 2016 (aged 68–69) Nenagh, County Tipperary, Ireland
- Genres: Rock; jazz
- Instrument: Drummer
- Years active: 1960s–?
- Formerly of: Grand Slam; Stepaside; Hot Press & the Silent Knights; The Chosen Few; Christy Moore; Skid Row; Auto Da Fé; Paul Brady; Clannad; Scullion; Hotfoot; Fleadh Cowboys

Robbie Brennan (1947 – April 12, 2016) was an Irish drummer and a former member of Phil Lynott's band Grand Slam. Brennan also played with a variety of Irish musicians such as Christy Moore, Skid Row, Auto Da Fé, Paul Brady and Clannad.

For several years in the late 1970s and early 1980s, Brennan was the drummer of the Dublin rock band Stepaside, named after the Dublin suburb of the same name, along with ex-Miami Showband member Paul Ashford.

He was also a member of Scullion recording Spin in 1985. Brennan played with Auto Da Fé, then later with Dublin jazz band Hotfoot during the 1980s until it disbanded in 1987.

== Death ==
Brennan died in Nenagh on 12 April 2016 after a long illness.

== Sources ==
- Putterford, Mark (2002). Phil Lynott: The Rocker. London, UK: Omnibus Press. ISBN 0-7119-9104-9.
- Stanway, Mark (2015). Close To The Mark. Wolverhampton, UK: Self Published. ISBN 978-194424653-2.
