= Mark Stanway =

British keyboardist (born 1954)

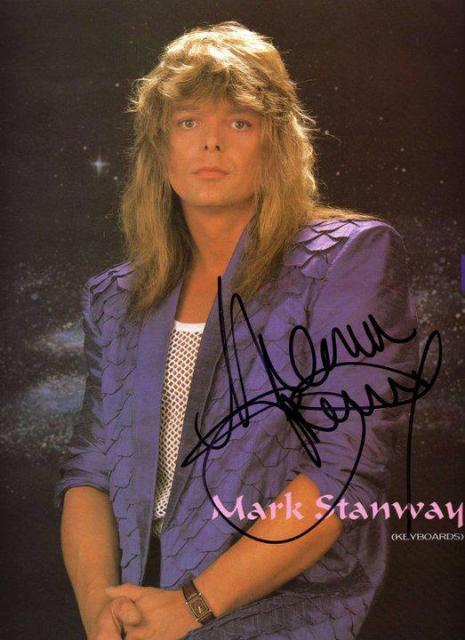

Background information
- Born: 27 July 1954 (age 72); Sutton Coldfield, England
- Origin: London, England
- Genres: Hard rock, blues rock, progressive rock
- Occupation: Keyboardist
- Years active: 1972–present

Mark Stanway (born 27 July 1954) is an English musician. He was the keyboard player for the hard rock band Magnum from 1980 until the end of 2016.

== Career ==
Stanway first appeared with Magnum on the 1980 recording of Chase the Dragon (released in 1982) Stanway provided keyboards on every studio album release from 1980 until his departure in 2016 (19 studio albums)

After a short stint with Stampede, Stanway formed Grand Slam with Phil Lynott after a Lynott solo tour in Sweden in mid 1983, this band was with Lynott on bass, Stanway on keyboards, John Sykes on guitar, Brian Downey on drums and Doish Nagle on rhythm guitar, which evolved into Grand Slam in 1984. Sykes later left to join Whitesnake and was replaced by Laurence Archer upon Stanway's recommendation. In 2016, Stanway reformed Grand Slam for a Sweden Rock Festival performance with Micky Barker (ex Magnum) on drums, Neil Murray on bass, Laurence Archer on guitar and Stefan Berggren on vocals. During this career, Stanway has performed and or recorded with many notable artists over the years including Robert Plant, Roy Wood, M3 Classic Whitesnake, featuring original Whitesnake members Micky Moody, Bernie Marsden and Neil Murray, Swiss Star Bastian Baker, Jimmy Copley, Manfred Mann's Earthband, The Quireboys, The Dogs D'amour, Mississippi blues singer Lisa Mills, Karl Wayne, Junior Giscombe, Spike Gray, Simon Kirke, Luke Morley, and The Sweden Rock Symphony Orchestra.

Stanway played keyboards on Magnum's successful On a Storyteller's Night album. Their success continued the following year with the Roger Taylor produced Vigilante in 1986, the top 5 album Wings of Heaven in 1988, and the Keith Olsen produced Goodnight L.A. which reached No. 9 in the UK Albums Chart in 1990.

On 9 December 2016, Stanway announced that he had left Magnum, midway through their five-date Divine Lies Winter Tour. He cited "irrevocable circumstances". Since his departure from Magnum, he has performed with the Sweden Rock Symphony Orchestra in 2017 and embarked on a series of 'An Intimate Evening With' shows and, in 2018, Stanway formed a new band, Kingdom of Madness, to perform Magnum songs from 1976 to 1994. This seven piece band features Stanway, former Magnum drummer Micky Barker (1985–95), former Magnum keyboard and flautist Richard Bailey (1973–74, 1976–80), vocalist and percussionist Mo Birch (UB40, Culture Club and Magnum), guitarist Laurence Archer (Stampede, Grandslam & UFO and Magnum in 1984), bassist Neil Murray (Whitesnake, Black Sabbath amongst many more) and vocalist Chris Ousey (Heartland & Snakecharmer). In July 2019, Murray was amicably replaced by Brian Badhams (ex Rainmaker, Steve Gibbons Band, Alaska, and continues to perform with Ellie Brooks).

== Discography ==
=== Stampede ===
- 1983 - Hurricane Town

=== Grand Slam ===
- 2002 - Studio Sessions
- 2003 - Grand Slam: Live 1984
