= Black Rose: A Rock Legend =

- Cover art by Jim Fitzpatrick

Studio album by Thin Lizzy
- Released: 13 April 1979
- Recorded: December 1978 – February 1979
- Studios: Pathé Marconi EMI Studios, Paris, France, Good Earth Studios and Morgan Studios, London, UK
- Genres: Hard rock; blues rock
- Length: 38:49
- Labels: Vertigo; Mercury (Canada); Warner Bros. (US)
- Producers: Tony Visconti and Thin Lizzy, Tony Visconti and Phil Lynott (on "With Love")

Thin Lizzy chronology
Bad Reputation (1977)	Black Rose: A Rock Legend (1979)	Chinatown (1980)

Singles from Black Rose: A Rock Legend
- 1. "Waiting for an Alibi" Released: 23 February 1979; 2. "Do Anything You Want To" Released: 8 June 1979; 3. "Got to Give It Up" Released: September 1979 (US); 4. "Sarah" Released: 5 October 1979

Black Rose: A Rock Legend is the ninth studio album by Irish rock band Thin Lizzy. Released in 1979, it has been described as one of the band's "greatest, most successful albums". It was the first time that guitarist Gary Moore remained in Thin Lizzy long enough to record an album—after previous brief stints in 1974 and 1977 with the band. The album peaked at No. 2 on the UK charts making it the band's highest-charting album in the UK. It was their fourth consecutive album to be certified Gold by the BPI.

== Songs ==
Black Rose included the second song Phil Lynott wrote about a member of his family titled "Sarah", the first song by this name having appeared on 1972's Shades of a Blue Orphanage, written about his grandmother, also named Sarah. The song on Black Rose is about his new-born daughter.

The last track "Róisín Dubh", consists of traditional songs, all arranged by Lynott and Moore, as well as many original parts. The song "Will You Go Lassie, Go" (also known as "Wild Mountain Thyme") is sometimes mistakenly credited as a traditional song but was in fact written by William McPeake and first recorded by Francis McPeake. It is credited on the album to "F. McPeak."

At least two of the songs - "Waiting for an Alibi" and "S & M" - were debuted on the early summer 1978 dates before Brian Robertson's departure from the band.

== Reception ==
Professional ratings
Review scores
Source	Rating
AllMusic	4.5/5 stars
Collector's Guide to Heavy Metal	10/10
Smash Hits	6/10

In a contemporary favourable review for the Irish magazine Hot Press, Dermot Stokes remarked: "Black Rose marks no major departure" from Thin Lizzy's "crystallised" imagery and sound, although "a poppier-feel insinuates itself here and there--seemingly by design". However, he was dubious about the rosy vision of Ireland offered in the title track and wondered whether the band had lost contact with the real life of their country. Writing in Smash Hits, Red Starr stated that the album: "lacked memorable melodies" and that "the blend of traditional tunes in the title track is an unholy mess." Starr acknowledged that fans of the band would be happy with "the reworking of their familiar hard rock style" but went on to note that there was: "nothing new for the rest of us."

In a modern review, Greg Prato of AllMusic described the album as: "Thin Lizzy's last true classic album" and "their most musically varied, accomplished, and successful studio album." He praised Moore's presence as: "a perfect fit" and singled out "Do Anything You Want To", "Waiting for an Alibi" and "Sarah" as stand-out tracks. He also praised the title track and its "amazing, complex guitar solo." In his Collectors Guide to Heavy Metal, Martin Popoff defined the album as "a charmed release" where "Waiting for an Alibi" and "Got to Give It Up" emerge as "two Thin Lizzy classics" and the title track "is on a plane more in league with fine literature than anything as base as rock 'n' roll."

== Track listings ==
Side one
No.	Title	Writer(s)	Length
1.	"Do Anything You Want To"	Phil Lynott	3:53
2.	"Toughest Street in Town"	Scott Gorham, Lynott, Gary Moore	4:01
3.	"S & M"	Brian Downey, Lynott	4:05
4.	"Waiting for an Alibi"	Lynott	3:30
5.	"Sarah"	Lynott, Moore	3:33

Side two
No.	Title	Writer(s)	Length
6.	"Got to Give It Up"	Gorham, Lynott	4:24
7.	"Get Out of Here"	Lynott, Midge Ure	3:37
8.	"With Love"	Lynott	4:38
9.	"Róisín Dubh (Black Rose): A Rock Legend": I. "Shenandoah"; II. "Will You Go Lassie Go"; III. "Danny Boy"; IV. "The Mason's Apron"	Lynott, Moore: Traditional, arranged by Lynott and Moore; Francis McPeake; Traditional, arranged by Lynott and Moore; Traditional, arranged by Lynott and Moore	7:06

=== Deluxe edition ===
A new remastered and expanded edition of Black Rose was released on 27 June 2011. This new edition is a 2-CD set—with the original album on disc one and bonus material on disc two.

Disc two
No.	Title	Writer(s)	Length
1.	"Just the Two of Us" (B-side of "Do Anything You Want To")	Lynott, Gorham	2:47
2.	"A Night in the Life of a Blues Singer" (longer version)	Lynott	5:44
3.	"Rockula (Rock Your Love)"	Jimmy Bain	4:16
4.	"Don't Believe a Word" (slow version with Lynott and Moore vocals)	Lynott	3:18
5.	"Toughest Street in Town" (different version)		3:58
6.	"S&M" (Nassau sessions, 1978)		3:18
7.	"Got to Give It Up" (Nassau sessions, 1978)		3:25
8.	"Cold Black Night" (Nassau sessions, 1978)	Moore	3:37
9.	"With Love" (Nassau sessions, 1978)		4:33
10.	"Black Rose" (Nassau sessions, 1978)		4:04
Total length:			39:00

== Singles ==
- Waiting For An Alibi / With Love – 7" (1979)
- Do Anything You Want To / Just The Two Of Us – 7" (1979)
- Do Anything You Want To / S & M – 7" (1979)
- Got To Give It Up / With Love – 7" (1979)
- Sarah / Got To Give It Up – 7" (1979)
- Star Trax EP: Jailbreak / Johnny The Fox Meets Jimmy The Weed / The Boys Are Back In Town / Waiting For An Alibi – 7" (1979)

== Personnel ==
=== Thin Lizzy ===
- Phil Lynott – lead vocals, bass guitar, twelve-string guitar
- Scott Gorham – lead and rhythm guitar, backing vocals
- Gary Moore – lead and rhythm guitar, backing vocals
- Brian Downey – drums, percussion

=== Additional musicians ===
- Jimmy Bain – bass guitar on "With Love" (uncredited)
- Huey Lewis – harmonica on "Sarah" and "With Love" (uncredited)
- Mark Nauseef – drums on "Sarah" (uncredited)

Production

- Tony Visconti – producer
- Kit Woolven – engineer
- Will Reid Dick, Chris Tsangarides – assistant engineers

== Charts ==
Chart (1979)	Peak position
Australian Albums (Kent Music Report)	29
New Zealand Albums (RMNZ)	48
Norwegian Albums (VG-lista)	15
Swedish Albums (Sverigetopplistan)	8
UK Albums (Official Charts)	2
US Billboard 200	81

== Certifications ==
Region	Certification	Certified units/sales
United Kingdom (BPI)	Gold	100,000^{^}
^{^} Shipments figures based on certification alone.
