= Cold Sweat (Thin Lizzy song) =

1983 single by Thin Lizzy

Single by Thin Lizzy

from the album Thunder and Lightning
- B-side: "Bad Habits"
- Released: 4 February 1983
- Genre: Heavy metal
- Label: Vertigo
- Songwriters: John Sykes, Phil Lynott
- Producers: Thin Lizzy & Chris Tsangarides

Thin Lizzy singles chronology
| "Hollywood (Down on Your Luck)" (1982) | "Cold Sweat" (1983) | "Thunder and Lightning" (1983) |

"Cold Sweat" is a song by Irish rock band Thin Lizzy, and is the fifth track on their final studio album Thunder and Lightning. It was co-written by guitarist John Sykes and Phil Lynott, and became the biggest single from the album, entering the UK charts at No. 28 (peaking at No. 27), and peaking at No. 23 in Ireland.

The song is known for Sykes's guitar solo, which features a tapping playing style that was becoming popular at the time of the album's release, though also used at the time by players such as Eddie Van Halen and Randy Rhoads.

== Recording and promotion ==
"Cold Sweat" was recorded as one of the last songs on the Thunder and Lightning album. Thin Lizzy had already written all the other material that was required, and by the time Sykes joined the band, it only remained to record the songs. He recalled, "Because I hadn't contributed anything at this stage I just let go with an outline of what was to become "Cold Sweat"; all of that was made up there and then in the studio." Sykes presented the riff, then Lynott developed the song further and worked out the arrangement. Sykes recalled in 2008: "About 20 minutes later it was pretty much all there. It all came together really easy." Producer Chris Tsangarides was surprised that the song was chosen as a single: "It was a bit heavy, even for them." Thin Lizzy were asked to perform the song on the British TV show Top of the Pops, but were deselected after Lynott argued with a stage manager.

On 28 January 1983, the band performed the song on the British TV music show The Tube, along with "The Sun Goes Down" and "The Boys Are Back in Town".

== Critical reception ==
Upon its release as a single, Chas de Whalley of Kerrang! described "Cold Sweat" as "classic Thin Lizzy, an out-and-out rocker with an explosive Exocet beat and a sidewinder guitar solo". His only criticism was that Lynott's vocals should have been "lifted a little in the mix". Robin Smith, writing for Record Mirror, said: "Leaving the world with a bang, 'Cold Sweat' is a construction kit of everything that made Thin Lizzy in their halcyon days. Frazzled guitar and Lynott's vicious vocals." Duran Duran keyboardist Nick Rhodes, as guest reviewer for Melody Maker, called the song "bordering on Motörhead speed" and predicted it would be a hit. He wrote: "A little fast for my taste but at least Thin Lizzy do what they do well and [this] seems to have all the elements of a heavy rock record that people who buy such things would like."

== Cover versions ==
- 1990: Sodom (Better off Dead)
- 1992: Re-Animator (That Was Then This Is Now)
- 1994: Helloween (Perfect Gentleman)
- 2001: Adam West (Hi-Balls Are Rolling!)
- 2001: Dreadnaught (One Piece Missing)
- 2007: Jorn (Unlocking the Past)
- 2007: Dublin Death Patrol (DDP 4 Life)
- 2010: Kalmah (Japanese bonus track on 12 Gauge)
- 2010: The Sword (Cold Sweat/Maiden, Mother & Crone single)
- 2013: Megadeth (Super Collider)

== Personnel ==
- Phil Lynott – bass guitar, lead vocals
- Scott Gorham – lead and rhythm guitar
- John Sykes – lead and rhythm guitar
- Brian Downey – drums
- Darren Wharton – keyboards

== Charts ==
| Chart (1983) | Peak position |
|---|---|
| Ireland (IRMA) | 23 |
| UK Singles (Official Charts) | 27 |
