= Laurence Archer =

British guitarist and songwriter (born 1961)

- Archer with Grand Slam in 1984

Background information
- Born: 9 November 1961 (age 64); London, England
- Origin: London, England
- Genre: Rock
- Occupation: Guitarist
- Years active: 1980–present
- Member of: Grand Slam; Stampede
- Formerly of: UFO; Wild Horses
- Website: https://grandslamrocks.com

Laurence Archer (born 9 November 1961) is a British guitarist and songwriter notable for his work with British rock bands UFO and Phil Lynott's Grand Slam. He wrote many of Grand Slam's songs together with Phil Lynott and Mark Stanway, some of which were released as Thin Lizzy songs. Archer was also a member of British band Wild Horses, Stampede, Lautrec, Medicine Head, and Rhode Island Red with Gary Leiderman on bass (ex-Talk Talk, Thin Lizzy), Manolo Antonana on drums, and frontman/actor/writer Mike Dyer.

While Archer was in Stampede, the band recorded two albums for Polydor Records: The Official Bootleg and Hurricane Town. Before that, Archer was in Lautrec with his stepfather, singer Reuben Archer.

Stampede re-formed in 2009 in the wake of renewed interest and the CD re-issues of both The Official Bootleg and Hurricane Town via UK-based Rock Candy Records and Universal Music in Japan. The line-up consisted of original members Laurence Archer, Reuben Archer, and Colin Bond, with Steve Graystone replacing Eddie Parsons on drums, and new guitarist Chris Clowsley.

In 2011, Archer also began playing in the band X-UFO, alongside fellow former members of UFO, Danny Peyronel and Clive Edwards, with Rocky Newton (ex-McAuley Schenker Group) on bass.

In May 2016, Mark Stanway and Laurence Archer announced the reformation of Phil Lynott's Grand Slam together with Micky Barker, Neil Murray, and Stefan Berggren.

In March 2019, Archer confirmed he was recording new material for Grandslam with Mike Dyer, David Boyce, and Benji Reid. Mark Stanway was asked to contribute keyboards on 3 songs. On 30 August 2019, BBC Radio 2 played the world premiere of the new Grandslam single "Gone are the Days". Grand Slam’s album, Hit the Ground, was released on 22 November 2019 via Marshall Records. In 2024, Rocky Newton joined as the new Bass guitarist.

The band then recorded their second album titled Wheel of Fortune with Silver Linings Records in 2024.

The early 2025 the band supported Saxon on a European tour.

== Discography ==
=== w/ Lautrec ===
- Mean Gasoline EP (1980)

=== Solo ===
- LA (1986)
- LA Secret (2019)

=== w/ Stampede ===
- Days of Wine and Roses EP (1982)
- The Official Bootleg (1982)
- Hurricane Town (1983)
- The Other Side 7" single (1983)
- A Sudden Impulse (2013)

=== with UFO ===
- High Stakes & Dangerous Men (1992)
- Lights Out In Tokyo (1992)

=== with Phil Lynott's Grand Slam ===
- Studio Sessions (2002)
- Live 1984 (2003, recorded 1984)
- Twilight's Last Gleaming (2003, recorded 1984)

=== with Grand Slam ===
- Hit the Ground (2019, recorded 2018)
- Wheel of Fortune (2024)
