= Chapter One (John Sykes album) =

Compilation album by John Sykes
- Released: 3 November 1998
- Genre: Hard rock
- Length: 59:25
- Label: Mercury Japan

John Sykes chronology
20th Century (1997)	Chapter One (1998)	Best of John Sykes (2000)

Chapter One is a compilation album by John Sykes, released in 1998. The record features material from Sykes' solo career, as well his time with Blue Murder. The album was released by the Japanese branch of Mercury Records without Sykes' involvement.

== Track listing ==
All songs written and composed by John Sykes, except where noted.

No.	Title	Writer(s)	Length
1.	"We All Fall Down"		4:42
2.	"Riot"		6:21
3.	"Look in His Eyes"		3:46
4.	"Don't Hurt Me This Way (Please Don't Leave Me '97)"	Sykes, Philip Lynott	4:48
5.	"Billy"		4:12
6.	"I Don't Wanna Live My Life Like You"		3:11
7.	"Black Days"		5:04
8.	"Jelly Roll" (live)		5:10
9.	"Soul Stealer"		3:37
10.	"Defcon 1"		3:37
11.	"She Knows" (live)		5:06
12.	"Thank You for the Love"		3:25
13.	"System Ain't Workin'"		3:27
14.	"Hold the Line"		2:59
Total length:			59:25
