= Bad Boy Live! =

Live album by John Sykes
- Released: 16 December 2004
- Recorded: 16 April 2004 (Osaka); 17 April 2004 (Nagoya); 20 April 2004 (Tokyo); 21 April 2004 (Kawasaki)
- Genre: Hard rock, heavy metal
- Length: 56:08
- Label: Victor
- Producer: John Sykes

John Sykes chronology
Nuclear Cowboy (2000)	Bad Boy Live! (2004)

Bad Boy Live! is a live album by English musician John Sykes, released on 16 December 2004. The album was recorded during a Japanese tour in April 2004. The record features songs from Sykes's solo career as well as his former bands Thin Lizzy, Whitesnake and Blue Murder. This is Sykes's final album before his death in 2024.

== Track listing ==
All songs written and composed by John Sykes, except where noted.

No.	Title	Writer(s)	Length
1.	"Bad Boys"	Sykes, David Coverdale	4:18
2.	"We All Fall Down"		5:05
3.	"Cold Sweat"	Sykes, Phil Lynott	3:33
4.	"Crying in the Rain"	Coverdale	6:06
5.	"Jelly Roll"		5:06
6.	"Is This Love"	Sykes, Coverdale	4:22
7.	"Look in His Eyes"		4:53
8.	"I Don't Wanna Live My Life Like You"		3:26
9.	"Please Don't Leave Me"	Sykes, Lynott	5:45
10.	"Still of the Night"	Sykes, Coverdale	8:15
11.	"Thunder and Lightning"	Lynott, Brian Downey	5:15
Total length:			56:08

== Personnel ==
Credits are adapted from the album's liner notes.

Musicians

- John Sykes – vocals, guitar
- Marco Mendoza – bass, backing vocals
- Tommy Aldridge – drums
- Derek Sherinian – keyboards, backing vocals

Additional musicians

- Rich Mazzetta – acoustic guitar (on "Jelly Roll")

Production

- John Sykes – production, engineering, mixing
- Michael Nielsen – engineering, mixing
- Sonic Solutions – mastering

Management

- Stu Ric – manager
- Mark O'Toole – co-manager
- Trish Harrison – business manager
- Drew Woerner – web info

Technical personnel

- Chip Harper – live sound
- Imy James – drum technician
- Rich Mazzetta – guitar technician
- Oscar Herrera – cartage
