= Best of John Sykes =

Greatest hits album by John Sykes
- Released: 22 February 2000
- Genre: Hard rock
- Length: 58:21
- Label: Mercury Japan

John Sykes chronology
| Chapter One (1998) | Best of John Sykes (2000) | Nuclear Cowboy (2000) |

Best of John Sykes is a compilation album by John Sykes, released in 2000. It features a slightly different track listing to Sykes' previous compilation album Chapter One.

== Track listing ==
All songs written and composed by John Sykes, except where noted.

| No. | Title | Writer(s) | Length |
|---|---|---|---|
| 1. | "Defcon 1" | | 3:37 |
| 2. | "Do or Die" | | 3:15 |
| 3. | "Look in His Eyes" | | 3:46 |
| 4. | "Don't Hurt Me This Way (Please Don't Leave Me '97)" | Sykes, Philip Lynott | 4:48 |
| 5. | "Billy" | | 4:12 |
| 6. | "I Don't Wanna Live My Life Like You" | | 3:11 |
| 7. | "Black Days" | | 5:04 |
| 8. | "Jelly Roll" (live) | | 5:10 |
| 9. | "Soul Stealer" | | 3:37 |
| 10. | "The Way You Kiss Me" | | 3:17 |
| 11. | "She Knows" (live) | | 5:06 |
| 12. | "Thank You for the Love" | | 3:25 |
| 13. | "System Ain't Workin'" | | 3:27 |
| 14. | "Cautionary Warning" | | 3:28 |
| 15. | "Hold the Line" | | 2:59 |
| Total length: | | | 58:21 |
