= Blue Murder =

Blue Murder may refer to:

== Theatre, film and TV ==
- Blue Murder (Beatrix Christian play), a 1994 play by Beatrix Christian
- Blue Murder (Peter Nichols play), a 1995 play by Peter Nichols
- Blue Murder (miniseries), a 1995 Australian mini-series
- Blue Murder (British TV series), a British detective series
- Blue Murder (Canadian TV series), a Canadian crime drama
- Blue Murder (1959 film), a 1959 Australian television movie
- Blue Murder (2000 film), a British television crime drama film

== Music ==
- Blue Murder (folk group), a folk group
- Blue Murder (band), an English heavy metal band
  - Blue Murder (album), the band's debut album
- "Blue Murder", song from Boy Cried Wolf
- "Blue Murder", song by the Tom Robinson Band on the 1979 album TRB Two

== See also ==
- Screaming Blue Murder (disambiguation)
