= Nothin' But Trouble (Blue Murder album) =

Studio album by Blue Murder
- Released: 31 August 1993
- Studio: John Sykes' Home Studio
- Genre: Hard rock
- Length: 55:33
- Label: Geffen
- Producer: John Sykes

Blue Murder chronology
Blue Murder (1989)	Nothin' But Trouble (1993)	Screaming Blue Murder: Dedicated to Phil Lynott (1994)

Singles from Nothin' But Trouble
- 1. "We All Fall Down" Released: 1993

Nothin' But Trouble is the second and final studio album by hard rock band Blue Murder. Released on 31 August 1993 by Geffen Records, the album was produced by the band's vocalist-guitarist John Sykes.

After the disappointing sales of their debut album, Blue Murder entered a prolonged period of inactivity. Eventually bassist Tony Franklin and drummer Carmine Appice left the group, leaving Sykes to put together a new line-up, featuring bassist Marco Mendoza, drummer Tommy O'Steen and keyboardist Nik Green. The album was recorded at Sykes's home studio in Los Angeles.

Nothin' But Trouble failed to chart outside of Japan, which Sykes attributed to Geffen's lack of promotion. In spite of this, the record received mostly positive reviews, although it was less well-received than the group's debut album. Although it was the last studio album from Blue Murder, the same core musicians – Sykes, Mendoza and O'Steen – would go on to play on Sykes' subsequent debut solo album Out of My Tree.

== Background ==
After the disappointing sales of their 1989 self-titled debut album, Blue Murder entered a long period of inactivity. According to bassist Tony Franklin and drummer Carmine Appice, vocalist-guitarist John Sykes was deeply affected by the record's commercial failure. Progress on a follow-up was slow, partly due to Sykes constructing a new home studio. Franklin and Appice, meanwhile, grew increasingly tired of waiting. Appice eventually left Blue Murder in December 1990 and was briefly replaced by former Yngwie Malmsteen drummer Anders Johansson. Franklin announced his departure in August 1991.

== Production ==
On the album, Sykes was joined by bassist Marco Mendoza and drummer Tommy O'Steen. Keyboardist Nik Green was also promoted to a full-time member, having already performed on the group's debut. Prior to his departure, Franklin had already recorded seven songs for the record, while Appice was brought back briefly as session drummer on nine. Sykes also recruited former Baton Rouge vocalist Kelly Keeling to the band as a second guitarist, but he left a day before shooting the music video for "We All Fall Down". In addition to backing vocals throughout the album, Keeling performs lead vocals on the track "I'm on Fire".

Nothin' But Trouble was self-produced by Sykes at his home studio in Los Angeles. The record was then mixed by Mike Fraser and mastered by George Marino. Additional engineering was provided by Nik Green and Alex Woltman. Producer Mike Stone was also briefly involved in recording process.

=== Music and lyrics ===
"We All Fall Down" tackles drug abuse and "losing sight of one's identity" because of it. "Itchycoo Park" was originally released by the Small Faces in 1967. The song was one of Sykes's favourites as a child. "Runaway" was written about "kids who go to Hollywood and end up on the streets".

Reflecting on the album in 2014, Sykes stated: "There are also some really good moments on the second album [...] But the mistake we made there was trying to go for radio airplay. We were persuaded to be more commercial."

== Release and reception ==
Professional ratings
Review scores
Source	Rating
AllMusic	3/5 stars
Chicago Tribune	3/4 stars
Collector's Guide to Heavy Metal	7/10
The Corsair	3.5/5 stars
Herald News	2.5/4 stars
Kerrang!	2/5 stars
Metal Hammer	3/7
Rock Hard	7.5/10

Nothin' But Trouble was released on 31 August 1993 by Geffen Records. It reached number six in Japan, but failed to chart elsewhere, which Sykes blamed on the label, who he felt "didn't do anything" to promote the record. Tony Franklin also opined that by 1993 grunge had become popular in the mainstream, which left groups like Blue Murder "out of vogue". "We All Fall Down" was released as the first and only single, reaching number 35 on the Album Rock Tracks chart. A music video was also produced for the track.

Nothin' But Trouble was generally well received by music critics, but commonly described as a step-down from the band's debut. The Chicago Tribune's Brenda You described the album as "one of the strongest metal albums of late", while The Corsair's Rei Nishimoto gave it three-and-a-half stars out of a potential five. Donald DiIorio, writing for the Herald News, commended Sykes for not chasing then-current musical trends, instead sticking to "good, old-fashioned hard rock". Save for two tracks ("We All Fall Down" and "Itchycoo Park"), Metal Hammer's Jörg Staude gave the album a negative review, describing the lyrics as "embarrassing" and the choruses "run-of-the-mill". Don Kaye, writing for Kerrang!, equally gave cudos to a few of the tracks, but concluded his review by stating: "In an era where both musicians and fans like it lean and mean, Blue Murder's lumbering style is already hopelessly outdated."

== Track listing ==
All tracks by John Sykes, except "Itchycoo Park" by Ronnie Lane and Steve Marriott.

No.	Title	Length
1.	"We All Fall Down"	4:47
2.	"Itchycoo Park" (Small Faces cover)	3:46
3.	"Cry for Love"	6:57
4.	"Runaway"	5:58
5.	"Dance"	4:08
6.	"I'm on Fire"	4:45
7.	"Save My Love"	4:48
8.	"Love Child"	5:29
9.	"Shouldn't Have Let You Go"	4:10
10.	"I Need an Angel"	7:02
11.	"She Knows"	3:38
Total length:		55:33

Japanese bonus track
No.	Title	Length
12.	"Bye Bye"	4:14
Total length:		59:47

== Personnel ==
Credits are adapted from the album's liner notes.

Blue Murder

- John Sykes - guitars, vocals
- Tommy O'Steen - drums, backing vocals
- Marco Mendoza - bass
- Kelly Keeling - backing vocals, lead vocals (on "I'm on Fire")
- Nik Green - keyboards

Additional musicians

- Carmine Appice - drums
- Tony Franklin - bass

Technical

- John Sykes - production, engineering
- Mike Fraser - mixing
- Nik Green - engineering
- Alex Woltman - engineering
- George Marino - mastering

Management

- John Kalodner - A&R
- Debra Shallman - A&R coordination

Design

- Wendy Sherman - art direction, design
- Stuart Watson - photography
- Diggy - cat direction
- Robin Sloane - creative direction
- Sofie Howard - creative services manager
- Masa Ito - liner notes (Japanese release only)

== Charts ==
Chart performance for Nothin' But Trouble1993 weekly chart performance for Nothin' But Trouble
Chart (1993)	Peak position
Japanese Albums (Oricon)	6

== Release history ==
Release formats for Nothin' But Trouble
Region	Date	Label	Format	Ref.
Europe	31 August 1993	Geffen; BMG	CD; Cassette	
North America	31 August 1993	Geffen; MCA	CD; Cassette	
Japan	8 September 1993	Geffen	CD	
Japan	18 January 2012	Geffen	SHM-CD	
