= Blue Murder (album) =

Studio album by Blue Murder
- Released: 24 April 1989
- Recorded: 1988–1989
- Studios: Little Mountain, Vancouver
- Genres: Hard rock; heavy metal; glam metal
- Length: 52:01
- Label: Geffen
- Producer: Bob Rock

Blue Murder chronology
Blue Murder (1989)	Nothin' But Trouble (1993)

Singles from Blue Murder
- 1. "Jelly Roll" Released: 1989

Blue Murder is the debut album by English hard rock band Blue Murder, released on 24 April 1989 by Geffen Records. It was produced by Bob Rock. The band was formed by guitarist John Sykes after his dismissal from Whitesnake. He was eventually joined by bassist Tony Franklin and drummer Carmine Appice. The band entered Little Mountain Sound Studios in early 1988 to begin recording their debut album. After several unsuccessful attempts at finding a lead singer, John Sykes took up the role, having already sung the band's first demos. Following the record's release, Blue Murder embarked on tours supporting Bon Jovi and Billy Squier.

Despite a positive reception from music critics, who touted the band's musicianship and Rock's production, the album underperformed commercially, only peaking at number 45 in the UK and number 69 in the US. Its failure has since been attributed to a variety of internal problems, including a lack of proper promotion, mismanagement and poor business decisions by the band. However, the record has garnered a small cult following since its release. In 2013, it was reissued and remastered by Rock Candy Records.

== Background ==
In 1986, guitarist John Sykes was fired from the English hard rock group Whitesnake by the band's lead vocalist David Coverdale. Sykes had recently finished recording the group's eponymous album, which he co-wrote with Coverdale. The album would go on to achieve multi-platinum status and peak at number two on the Billboard 200 chart. Sykes retreated to his home studio in Blackpool, England, where he started writing new material. Eager to prove himself, Sykes began putting together a new band in February 1987. First to join was drummer Cozy Powell, who had played with Sykes in Whitesnake from 1984 to 1985. Next came bassist Tony Franklin, formerly of The Firm. He was one of Sykes's top choices for the band and, as it happened, the husband of Franklin's cousin was working at Sykes's studio. Through him, they were able to get in touch with one another and, after a brief jam session, Franklin agreed to join the band. Last was singer Ray Gillen, who had previously fronted Black Sabbath for a short time. After solidifying their line-up, the band headed to Spain to record some demos, which were then sent to Geffen Records, with whom Sykes had worked with while in Whitesnake. A&R executive John Kalodner was unimpressed by Gillen's performance, preferring the initial demos that Sykes had sung. Kalodner also expressed doubts over Gillen's songwriting abilities. At the same time, Sykes and Gillen were having disagreements over the vocal approach. Ultimately, Gillen left after only a few months in the band. In mid-1987, the group signed a recording contract with Geffen Records.

As the band began their search for a new lead singer, Cozy Powell, who had become frustrated with the group's lack of progress, left to join Black Sabbath in early 1988. The band were then approached by drummer Carmine Appice, who had previously worked with Rod Stewart, Vanilla Fudge and King Kobra, among others. Eager to work with both Sykes and Franklin, Appice got in touch with them through music journalist Chris Welch after a Dio concert at the Hammersmith Odeon in December 1987 (Appice's brother Vinny was the drummer for Dio at the time). Appice was invited to Blackpool for a jam session, after which he formally joined the band. English drummer Aynsley Dunbar (ex-Journey, and Sykes's former bandmate in Whitesnake) also auditioned, but ultimately Sykes and Franklin felt that he wasn't the right fit for the group. With a drummer now in place, the band continued their search for a new lead singer. Former Black Sabbath vocalist Tony Martin was eventually chosen, but as the band were about to fly to Vancouver to begin recording their debut album in early 1988, Martin pulled out. The group decided to push forward, figuring they could always find a singer later.

== Production and composition ==
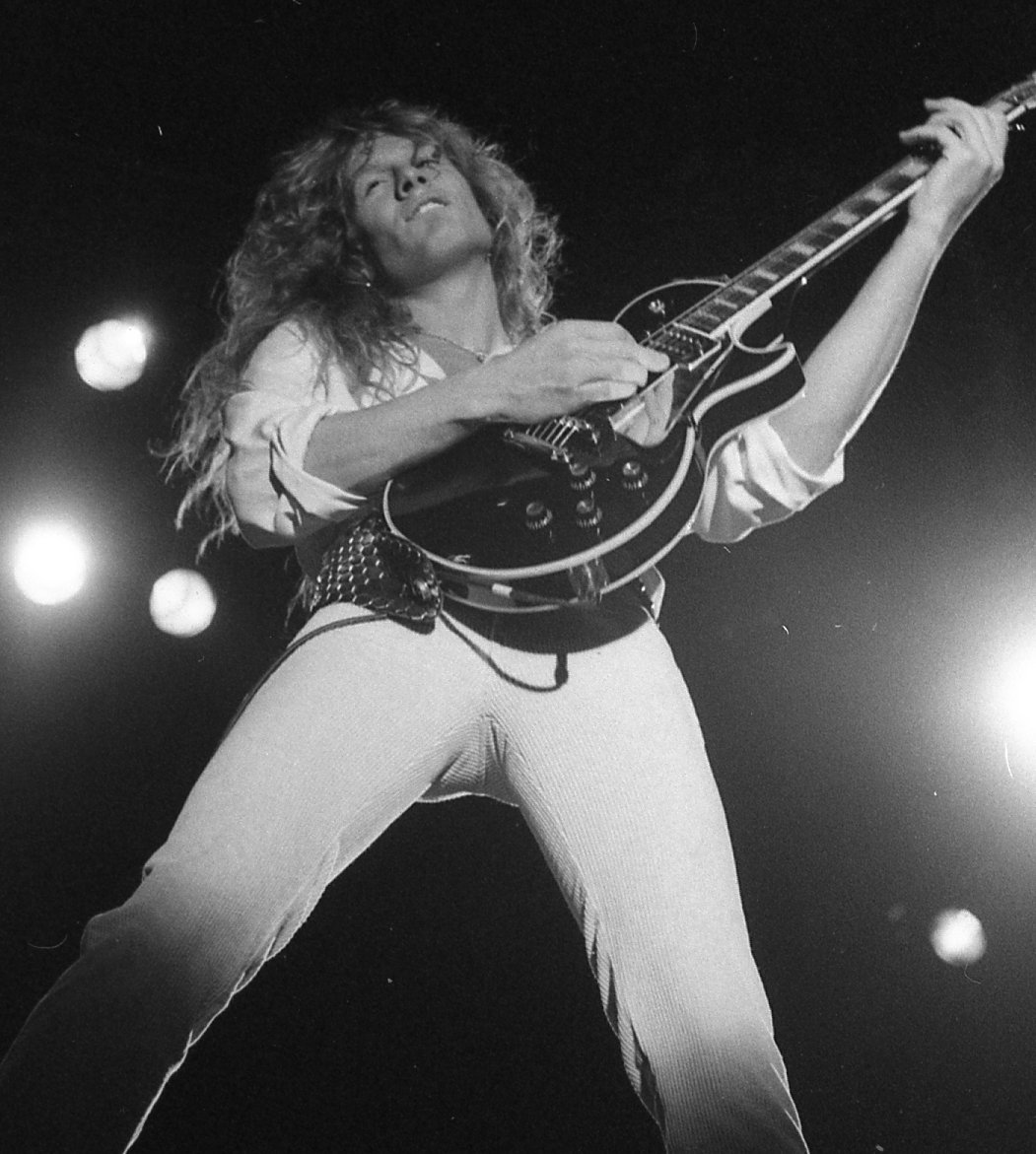
John Sykes (pictured in 1983) was initially reluctant to sing lead vocals on the album, but was eventually persuaded by the band and John Kalodner

The band entered Little Mountain Sound Studios in February 1988 to record their debut album. Bob Rock was chosen to produce, having previously worked with Sykes on Whitesnake's eponymous album. Acting as engineer was Mike Fraser, who mixed the record as well. David Donnelly supervised the mastering process. Keyboardist Nik Green was also brought in to play on the album. Due to Rock's prior engagements with Bon Jovi and The Cult, recording was halted after six weeks, which allowed the band to audition more singers. Among them were David Glen Eisley and Derek St. Holmes. Unable to agree on a frontman, Sykes was eventually persuaded by John Kalodner and the rest of the band to take up the role of lead singer. Having had no proper vocal training, Sykes initially struggled to sing the tracks, but eventually eased into it, drawing upon what he had learned working with David Coverdale and Thin Lizzy frontman Phil Lynott.

The band was named Blue Murder at Tony Franklin's suggestion, after the British idiom "scream blue murder". Their logo was designed by graphic artist Margo Chase. The album's packaging featured photographs of the band dressed in pirate attire. Originally, the group had wished for a simple black and white photo, but Geffen insisted on shooting in colour. When asked why they were dressed as pirates, Sykes jokingly responded: "You know, now there are so many album covers with shiny photos of fashionable clothes; better pirate clothes then!" The album was dedicated to Phil Lynott, who died in 1986. While not initially planned, Sykes felt "it was the right thing to do" after the record was finished.

=== Music and lyrics ===
Blue Murder has been described by music critics as hard rock heavy metal, and glam metal. Sykes described the band's sound in an interview with Raw magazine as having elements of both Whitesnake and Thin Lizzy, as well as the blues. Tracks such as "Sex Child", "Valley of the Kings" and "Ptolemy" have also drawn comparisons to Led Zeppelin. Sykes's intent with Blue Murder was to create a heavier record than Whitesnake's eponymous album, while still retaining some of the same groove and vibe. In an interview with Metal Shock magazine, Sykes referred to the band's music as "heavy funk".

The song "Billy" was described by Sykes as his "Thin Lizzy track", with lyrics inspired by the 1949 film White Heat. The album's title-track he characterised as a "police story". He also remarked how the song reminds him the most of his time with Thin Lizzy. "Valley of the Kings" draws from Egyptian culture, while "Jelly Roll" was inspired by a former relationship of Sykes's. When asked to name his favourite track from the album, Sykes chose "Jelly Roll" as it was one of the easiest ones to write. By contrast, "Sex Child" took approximately five weeks to complete. Despite being credited as a co-writer on "Valley of the Kings", Tony Martin has stated that he actually co-wrote a significant portion of the record with Sykes, but was not credited.

== Release and promotion ==
Blue Murder was released on 24 April 1989. To promote the record, the band made appearances on MTV's Hard 60 and The Big Al Show, hosted by "Weird Al" Yankovic. They then embarked on an American tour supporting Bon Jovi. Later they performed on a triple-bill tour with Billy Squier and King's X. Blue Murder also played several headline dates in America and Japan. Due to unspecified management issues, a European tour never materialized.

Blue Murder reached number 45 on the UK Albums Chart. It debuted at number 172 on the Billboard 200 chart, eventually peaking at number 69 in June 1989. According to Carmine Appice, the album only sold around 150,000 copies in the United States. Worldwide, the record sold approximately 500,000 copies, according to John Sykes. In 2013, Blue Murder was reissued by Rock Candy Records. The reissue featured a remastered version of the album, a 3,500 word essay by Malcolm Dome and an interview with John Sykes. The initial pressings listed a tenth song, titled "Cold Harbor", as part of the content. This was, however, a misprinting and no such song appears on the album.

Blue Murder's success fell short of expectations, as the sales for their debut album disappointed both the band and label. Sykes felt that Geffen did not properly promote the group, stating in 1999: "I think they were trying to get me and David [Coverdale] back together. They wanted me to get back with the 'winning formula'. But the wounds were too fresh. I stayed with the same label. In hindsight, I would have done better with a different label." Sykes also speculated that the heaviness of the record and a lack of a clear hit single contributed to its failure. Carmine Appice pointed to a lack of clear management as another contributing factor. Initially, the band were managed by a three-person team led by Sykes's stepfather. As Blue Murder were about to go on tour, however, they were fired. Eventually, the band hired Bruce Allen to manage them, but by this point Appice said "it was too late" and the album had already underperformed. John Kalodner felt that Blue Murder's failure boiled down to John Sykes not being a strong enough frontman, even though it was Kalodner who recommended Sykes to be the frontman.

=== Singles ===
"Valley of the Kings" was released as a promotional single from the album. A music video, directed by Mary Lambert, was also shot for a reported $150,000. The video was later featured as MTV's "Hip Clip of the Week". The initial plan put forth by John Kalodner was to release "Valley of the Kings" first to "get a buzz going". This would have then been followed up by "Jelly Roll", which would have received a greater push on MTV and radio. However, as the band were on tour, they began demanding a greater push for "Valley of the Kings". In retrospect, Carmine Appice called this a "dumb mistake", as the song was deemed "too long" and "not commercial enough" for MTV. The single was not available to purchase by the general public, something Tony Franklin felt also hurt its success.

"Jelly Roll" was released as the second single from the album. A music video, directed again by Mary Lambert, was shot over the course of two days in North Los Angeles. The video featured model Meg Register, who had a small role in the 1986 film Running Scared. The song became a minor hit, reaching number fifteen on the Album Rock Tracks chart. However, due to the failure of "Valley of the Kings", MTV refused to play the video for "Jelly Roll", which Franklin felt prevented it from becoming a crossover hit.

== Critical reception ==
Professional ratings
Review scores
Source	Rating
AllMusic	4.5/5 stars
Collector's Guide to Heavy Metal	7/10
Hi-Fi News & Record Review	A:2
Kerrang!	5/5 stars
Raw	10/10
Record Collector	4/5 stars
Rock Hard	9/10

Contemporary reviews for the album were mostly positive. Raw's Paul Suter gave Blue Murder a ten out of ten rating, and called it one of "the finest records in an age". He gave special praise to Bob Rock's production and commended the band's musicianship, particularly Sykes's guitar playing, which he thought elevated him to the same level as Ritchie Blackmore and Jimmy Page. Rock Hard's review was similarly voiced, with "Riot", "Valley of the Kings" and "Blue Murder" being singled out as particular highlights. The record was also described as a must-have for fans of rock music. Warren J. Rhodes, writing for The California Aggie, called the album "excellent", while Neil Jeffries of Kerrang! hailed it as a "masterpiece", giving it a perfect score. Spin's Jon Young, meanwhile, gave the record a scathing review, calling it a "disaster" and the band "aimless". He characterized Sykes's vocals as "shrill" and his guitar playing "hyperactive", while tracks like "Jelly Roll" and "Out of Love" were described as "bloated" and "weepy", respectively. Hi-Fi News & Record Review's review pointed to the lyrics as a particular source of criticism: "Blue Murder are just heavy enough to let you ignore the words to 'Sex Child'". Andrew Martin of Music Week compared the band's music to Cream by saying that "it's a full-on stomp of a heavy rock album." The Tennessean labeled the album "merely derivative hard rock, virtually indistinguishable from that of a hundred other bands."

Retrospective reviews for the album have been largely positive, and the record has garnered a small cult following. Eduardo Rivadavia of AllMusic praised the band's musicianship, and remarked how the album has "endured far better than most similarly styled heavy metal albums of the era". He also touted the production as one of Rock's best alongside his work with Metallica. Rivadavia was, however, critical of the perceived Led Zeppelin influences found on some of the tracks. Author Martin Popoff awarded Blue Murder a score of seven out of ten in his 2005 book Collector's Guide to Heavy Metal, while Record Collector's William Pinfold gave the album four stars out of five. White Wizzard guitarist Will Wallner, writing for Guitar World, called the album "phenomenal", with special praise being given to Sykes's playing. White Wizzard's Jon Leon, meanwhile, named Blue Murder one of his favourite obscure heavy metal records of the 1980s. Ultimate Classic Rock named Blue Murder the sixth best album produced by Bob Rock, while MetalSucks included it on a list of essential hair metal albums not included on a similar list by Rolling Stone. Radio and television personality Eddie Trunk also highlighted the album in his 2011 book Eddie Trunk's Essential Hard Rock and Heavy Metal. In addition to calling the album "underrated", Alter Bridge's Myles Kennedy stated in 2014: "These days there's a whole Brotherhood Of Blue Murder out there – musicians and crew guys who love this band. You’d be surprised how many of us there are."

== Track listing ==
All songs written and composed by John Sykes, except where indicated.

No.	Title	Writer(s)	Length
1.	"Riot"		6:22
2.	"Sex Child"		5:51
3.	"Valley of the Kings"	Sykes, Tony Martin	7:51
4.	"Jelly Roll"		4:44
5.	"Blue Murder"	Sykes, Carmine Appice, Tony Franklin	4:54
6.	"Out of Love"		6:44
7.	"Billy"		4:12
8.	"Ptolemy"		6:30
9.	"Black-Hearted Woman"	Sykes, Appice, Franklin	4:48
Total length:			52:01

== Personnel ==
Credits are adapted from the album's liner notes.

Blue Murder

- John Sykes – guitars, lead and backing vocals
- Tony Franklin – bass, backing vocals
- Carmine Appice – drums, backing vocals

Additional musicians

- Nik Green – keyboards
- John Webster – additional keyboard programming
- Marc LaFrance – additional backing vocals
- David Steele – additional backing vocals

Technical

- Bob Rock – production
- Mike Fraser – engineering, mixing
- Chris Taylor – assistant engineering
- Ken Lomis – assistant engineering
- Jim Champagne – mixing assistant
- David Donnelly – mastering supervisor
- Dan Hersch – compact disc mastering
- John Golden – album mastering

A&R

- John Kalodner – A&R

Design

- Gabrielle Raumberger – art direction, design
- Maria DeGrassi – design
- Margo Chase – logo
- Aaron Rapaport – photography

Reissue

- Steve Hammonds – product management
- Jon Astley – remastering
- Julia Melanie Goode – creative direction

== Charts ==
Chart (1989)	Peak position
Canada Top Albums/CDs (RPM)	88
Japanese Albums (Oricon)	21
Swedish Albums (Sverigetopplistan)	39
UK Albums (Official Charts)	45
US Billboard 200	69

== Release history ==
Release formats for Blue Murder
Region	Date	Label	Format	Ref.
Various	24 April 1989	Geffen	LP; CD	
Japan	25 April 1989	Geffen	CD	
Japan	18 January 2012	Geffen	SHM-CD	
UK	April 2013	Rock Candy	CD	
Various	2018	Geffen	Digital download; streaming	
