= Screaming Blue Murder =

Screaming Blue Murder may refer to:

- Screaming Blue Murder: Dedicated to Phil Lynott, Blue Murder album
- Screaming Blue Murder (Girlschool album)

== See also ==
- Blue Murder (disambiguation)
