= 20th century (disambiguation) =

The 20th century of the Common Era began on 1 January 1901 and ended on 31 December 2000, according to the Gregorian calendar.

20th century may also refer to:

- 20th century BC

== Film and theatre ==
- 20th Century Studios, an American film production company formerly known as 20th Century Fox that has been owned by The Walt Disney Company since 2019
  - Twentieth Century Pictures, one of the predecessors of 20th Century Studios (along with Fox Film)
- Twentieth Century (play), a 1932 Broadway play
- Twentieth Century (film), a 1934 American comedy
- On the Twentieth Century, a 1978 musical based on the play and film
- The Twentieth Century, the 1957–1970 television series
- 20th Century with Mike Wallace, the 1990s–2000s television series
- The Twentieth Century (film), a 2019 film by Matthew Rankin
- 20th Century Girl, a 2022 film by Bang Woo-ri

== Music ==
- 20th Century Records, a record label begun as a soundtrack division of Twentieth Century Pictures
- 20th Century, a sub-unit of Japanese boyband V6
- Twentieth Century (Cold Chisel album), 1984, or the title song
- Twentieth Century (Alabama album), 1999, or the title song
- 20th Century (3X Krazy album)
- 20th Century (John Sykes album)
- "Twentieth Century", a song by Pet Shop Boys from Fundamental

== Other ==
- Twentieth Century (typeface), a sans-serif typeface
- 20th Century (cocktail), a gin cocktail
- Twentieth Century Motor Car Corporation, a failed automobile company
- The Twentieth Century (periodical), a continuation of The Nineteenth Century (periodical)
- XXth Century, Nazi Germany-funded journal in Shanghai published by Klaus Mehnert

== See also ==
- 20th Century Limited, the flagship passenger train of the New York Central Railroad
