= Nuclear Cowboy =

Studio album by John Sykes
- Released: 27 October 2000
- Studio: The Bunker (Los Angeles)
- Genre: Heavy metal, nu-metal, industrial metal, hard rock
- Length: 49:36
- Label: Mercury Japan
- Producer: John Sykes

John Sykes chronology
Best of John Sykes (2000)	Nuclear Cowboy (2000)	Bad Boy Live! (2004)

Professional ratings
Review scores
Source	Rating
AllMusic	link

Nuclear Cowboy is the fourth and final solo studio album by English musician John Sykes, released on 27 October 2000. The record saw Sykes experimenting with drum loops and other elements of hip hop production.

== Track listing ==
All songs written and composed by John Sykes, except where noted.

No.	Title	Writer(s)	Length
1.	"Intro"		0:34
2.	"We Will"		4:07
3.	"Nuclear Cowboy"	Sykes, Peter Black	4:23
4.	"Arc Angel"	Sykes, Black	4:56
5.	"Nothing Means Nothing"		4:35
6.	"Talking 'bout Love"	Sykes, Black	5:39
7.	"One Way System"		3:42
8.	"Interlude 'All Good People'"		0:25
9.	"Degraded"	Sykes, Black	4:16
10.	"Sick"	Sykes, Black	4:10
11.	"I Wish It Would Rain"		7:13
12.	"Raising the Devil"		5:36
Total length:			49:36

== Personnel ==
Credits are adapted from the album's liner notes.

Musicians

- John Sykes – guitars, vocals, bass
- Carmine Appice – drums, percussion
- Jamie Muhoberac – keyboards, piano
- Marco Mendoza – bass
- Tommy O'Steen – drums (on "Talking 'Bout Love")
- Alex Alessandroni – keyboards, piano
- Curt Bisquera – drums
- Bonnie Bonnepart – drums

Production

- John Sykes – production
- Peter Black – engineer, programming
- Nick Els - engineering, mixing
- Tom Fletcher - engineering, mixing
- Alex Woltman - engineering
- Mars Lazar - programming
- Adam Schiff - programming
- Chris Bellman - mastering
