= Loveland (John Sykes album) =

Studio album by John Sykes
- Released: 25 July 1997
- Genre: Soft rock
- Length: 39:51
- Label: Mercury Japan
- Producer: John Sykes

John Sykes chronology
Out of My Tree (1995)	Loveland (1997)	20th Century (1997)

Loveland is the second solo album by English musician John Sykes, released on 25 July 1997.

The record was originally pitched to Sykes as a seven-track extended play of ballads by the Japanese branch of Mercury Records. As he was working on it, Sykes suggested expanding the project into a full-length album as he still had some songs left over. The track "Don't Hurt Me This Way" is a re-recording of Sykes' 1982 single "Please Don't Leave Me", which features late Thin Lizzy frontman Phil Lynott.

The album reached number 13 on the Japanese charts.

== Track listing ==
All songs written and composed by John Sykes, except where noted.

No.	Title	Writer(s)	Length
1.	"Everything I Need"		4:03
2.	"Didn't We Say"		4:11
3.	"Don't Hurt Me This Way (Please Don't Leave Me '97)"	Sykes, Philip Lynott	4:48
4.	"Hold the Line"		2:59
5.	"Thank You for Your Love"		3:21
6.	"Wuthering Heights"		2:49
7.	"Till the Day I Die"	Sykes, Alex Alessandroni	4:41
8.	"Haunted"		5:01
9.	"I'll Be Waiting"		3:14
10.	"Don't Say Goodbye"		4:44
Total length:			39:51

== Personnel ==
Credits are adapted from the album's liner notes.

Musicians

- John Sykes – guitar, vocals
- Philip Lynott – vocals (on "Don't Hurt Me This Way (Please Don't Leave Me '97)")
- Alex Alessandroni – keyboards, piano
- Jamie Muhoberac – keyboards, piano
- Marco Mendoza – bass
- Reggie Hamilton – bass
- Abe Laboriel Jr. – drums, percussion
- Curt Bisquera – drums
- Jim Sitterly – 1st violin concert master
- Kavan – cello
- Tommy O'Steen – drums (on "Haunted")

Additional musicians

- Tony Franklin and Nick Green (on "Don't Say Goodbye")

Production

- John Sykes – production
- Noel Golden – mixing, engineering
- Orris Henry – additional engineering
- Steve Markason – mastering

== Charts ==
Chart performance for Loveland1997 weekly chart performance for Loveland
Chart (1997)	Peak position
Japanese Albums (Oricon)	13
