= Screaming Blue Murder: Dedicated to Phil Lynott =

Live album by Blue Murder
- Released: 21 May 1994
- Recorded: December 1993 (Tokyo, Japan)
- Genre: Hard rock, Heavy metal
- Length: 58:05
- Label: Geffen
- Producer: John Sykes

Blue Murder chronology
Nothin' But Trouble (1993)	Screaming Blue Murder: Dedicated to Phil Lynott (1994)

Professional ratings
Review scores
Source	Rating
AllMusic	3/5 stars
Collector's Guide to Heavy Metal	7/10

Screaming Blue Murder: Dedicated to Phil Lynott is a live album by the English hard rock band Blue Murder. Released on 21 May 1994 by Geffen Records, it is the band's third and final release. Recorded in December 1993 in Tokyo, Japan, the album features original material by both Blue Murder and frontman John Sykes as well as songs by Sykes's previous bands Thin Lizzy and Whitesnake.

The record was originally issued only in Japan and reached number seven on the charts. It has since been re-released internationally through digital streaming services and stores, via Pro Rock Productions Inc on 15 August 2009 and was re-released through Geffen on 31 January 2025, eleven days after the announcement of Sykes' passing.

== Track listing ==
All tracks written by John Sykes, except where indicated.

No.	Title	Writer(s)	Length
1.	"Riot"		7:16
2.	"Cry for Love"		7:53
3.	"Cold Sweat"	Sykes, Phil Lynott	3:26
4.	"Billy"		6:45
5.	"Save My Love"		3:36
6.	"Jelly Roll"		4:51
7.	"We All Fall Down"		5:24
8.	"Please Don't Leave Me"	Sykes, Lynott	7:27
9.	"Still of the Night"	Sykes, David Coverdale	8:48
10.	"Dancing in the Moonlight"	Lynott	4:39
Total length:			58:05

== Personnel ==
Credits are adapted from the album's liner notes.

Blue Murder

- John Sykes - guitar, vocals
- Marco Mendoza - bass, backing vocals
- Tommy O'Steen - drums, backing vocals
- Nik Green - keyboards

Technical

- John Sykes - production, mixing
- Tsuneo Tomono - mixing
- Naomi Ohno - liner notes

== Charts ==
Chart performance for Screaming Blue Murder: Dedicated to Phil Lynott1994 weekly chart performance for Screaming Blue Murder: Dedicated to Phil Lynott
Chart (1994)	Peak position
Japanese Albums (Oricon)	7

== Release history ==
Release formats for Screaming Blue Murder: Dedicated to Phil Lynott
Region	Date	Label	Format	Ref.
Japan	21 May 1994	Geffen	CD	
Various	15 August 2009	Pro Rock Productions; CD Baby	Digital download; streaming	
Japan	18 May 2016	Geffen	SHM-CD	
Various	31 January 2025	Geffen	Digital download; streaming	
