= Out of My Tree =

Studio album by John Sykes
- Released: 21 August 1995
- Genre: Hard rock
- Length: 40:50
- Label: Mercury Japan
- Producer: John Sykes

John Sykes chronology
Out of My Tree (1995)	Loveland (1997)

Singles from Out of My Tree
- 1. "I Don't Wanna Live My Life Like You" Released: 5 October 1995

Out of My Tree is the first solo album by English musician John Sykes, released on 21 August 1995.

After Sykes's previous band Blue Murder was dropped by Geffen Records, he signed a new recording contract with the Japanese branch of Mercury Records. Viewing this as a fresh start, the band was renamed Sykes. Out of My Tree was recorded essentially live in the studio to preserve the arrangements in concert.

Out of My Tree reached number seven on the Japanese charts. The track "I Don't Wanna Live My Life Like You" was released as a single.

== Track listing ==
All songs written and composed by John Sykes.

No.	Title	Length
1.	"Soul Stealer"	3:38
2.	"I Don't Wanna Live My Life Like You"	3:11
3.	"She's All Action"	3:21
4.	"Standing at the Crossroads"	3:54
5.	"I Don't Believe in Anything"	5:03
6.	"Black Days"	5:02
7.	"Jesus & Mary"	4:16
8.	"Do or Die"	3:15
9.	"If You Ever Need Love"	4:17
10.	"Sleep On"	4:48
Total length:		40:50

== Personnel ==
Credits are adapted from the album's liner notes.

Musicians

- John Sykes – guitar, vocals, backing vocals, bass
- Marco Mendoza – bass
- Tommy O'Steen – drums

Production

- John Sykes – production
- Alex Woltman – engineering, mixing
- Kevin Reeves – mastering
- Jim Fitzpatrick – art design and illustration
- Masahiro Yamazaki and Ryota Mizuki – booklet design
- Jim Siterly – string arrangements (on "I Don't Believe In Anything", "If You Ever Need Love" and "Black Days")

== Charts ==
Chart performance for Out of My Tree1995 weekly chart performance for Out of My Tree
Chart (1995)	Peak position
Japanese Albums (Oricon)	7
