= 20th Century (John Sykes album) =

Studio album by John Sykes
- Released: 26 December 1997
- Recorded: The Bunker (Northridge); Rumba Recorders (Canoga Park)
- Genre: Hard rock
- Length: 38:10
- Label: Mercury Japan
- Producer: John Sykes

John Sykes chronology
Loveland (1997)	20th Century (1997)	Chapter One (1998)

20th Century is the third solo album by English musician John Sykes, released on 26 December 1997.

The record is a companion piece to Sykes's second solo album Loveland, released that same year. As Loveland was entirely composed of ballads, 20th Century was written to dispel accusations that Sykes had "gone soft". Sykes's goal with the album was also to have shorter and more "concise" songs, similar in vein to Van Halen's first album. The album's title was inspired by the impending end of the 20th century.

The album reached number 47 on the Japanese charts.

== Track listing ==
All songs written and composed by John Sykes.

No.	Title	Length
1.	"Look in His Eyes"	3:47
2.	"20th Century Heartache"	3:58
3.	"I Get Around"	2:56
4.	"2 Counts"	4:27
5.	"Defcon 1"	3:37
6.	"System Ain't Working"	3:27
7.	"The Way You Kiss Me"	3:17
8.	"Found What I Needed"	3:35
9.	"Cautionary Warning"	3:28
10.	"Touched by Evil"	5:38
Total length:		38:10

== Personnel ==
Credits are adapted from the album's liner notes.

Musicians

- John Sykes – guitars, vocals, bass (on "2 Counts")
- Marco Mendoza – bass
- Simon Phillips – drums

Additional musicians

- Tommy O'Steen – drums (on "2 Counts")
- Tommy Aldridge – drums (on "Look In His Eyes")
- Bonnie Bonapart – drums (on "System Ain't Working" and "Found What I Needed")
- Mars Lasar – keyboards

Production

- John Sykes – production
- Noel Golden – mixing
- Jeff Robinette – additional mix engineering
- Orris Henry – additional engineering
- Eddy Schreyer – mastering

Artwork

- William Hames – photography
- John Sykes and Tami Fukatami – artwork concept
- Masahiro Yamazaki and Ryota Mizuki – designs

== Charts ==
Chart performance for Loveland1997 weekly chart performance for 20th Century
Chart (1997)	Peak position
Japanese Albums (Oricon)	47
