= Margo Chase =

American graphic designer (1958–2017)

- Born: February 20, 1958; San Gabriel, California, U.S.
- Died: July 22, 2017 (aged 59); Apple Valley, California, U.S.
- Occupation: Graphic designer
- Known for: Logo designer for Buffy the Vampire Slayer, Bram Stoker's Dracula, Like a Prayer
- Spouse: Patrick Dugan
- Website: https://www.chasedesigngroup.com/

Margo Chase (February 20, 1958 – July 22, 2017) was an American graphic designer known for her eclectic and experimental design style. Chase was prolific – with a career bridging the graphic design field's transition from the analog to the digital era, working with clients ranging from Selena and Prince to Mattel and Procter & Gamble.

== Early life and education ==
Margo Chase was born on February 20, 1958, in San Gabriel, California. Chase grew up surrounded by the arts — both parents were musically-inclined, and Chase's mother was an accomplished calligrapher: "I grew up watching her make beautiful forms with strange pens and brushes." Chase attended California Polytechnic, San Luis Obispo where she studied Biology with the intention of becoming a veterinarian. Wishing to bolster her GPA with an eye towards graduate school Chase began taking a variety of art classes, soon exhausting her options in CalPoly's arts department, leaving only an illustration class. What began as a quest for an easy 'A' lead her to abandon her veterinary aspirations for a career in medical illustration.

Upon graduating with her B.S., Chase attended the University of California, San Francisco's medical illustration program though she dropped out after a year, citing boredom.

== Work and career ==
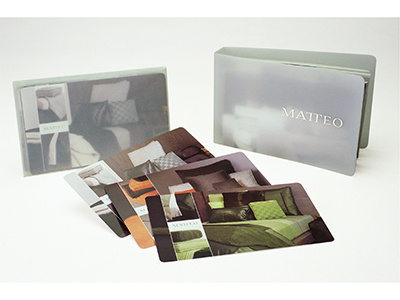
Selection of materials designed for Matteo Linens by Margo Chase

With a portfolio of medical illustrations, Chase found work at a small advertising firm in Long Beach, designing packaging for the Ralph's grocery store chain. She was soon hired away by Rosebud Books to design a series of tourist guidebooks. During this time, Chase met Laura LaPuma, who would go on to give her her first album cover design job at Warner Brothers Records. As she accumulated more design work, Chase set up an office in her Silverlake home, hiring Nancy Ogami and studio manager Robert Short to assist in servicing clients such as Geffen Records, Virgin Records, and others.

Chase designed logos for Prince's Lovesexy, as well as his Paisley Park production company. Attracting enough positive attention, she was asked to design the logo – and eventually the packaging – for Madonna's 1989 album Like a Prayer. This opened the door for other high-profile projects such as Cher's Love Hurts, the poster campaign for 1992's Bram Stoker's Dracula, and others.

Chase's work from this period of her career was quite distinct, taking inspiration from a wide variety of sources – calligraphy, illuminated manuscripts, and medieval architecture – leading publications to refer to her as the "Queen of Goth." Wary of being aesthetically pigeonholed, she took on work for linen manufacturer Matteo. What initially began as a logo and stationary design project morphed into full-blown textile and product design. During this time, Chase expanded her studio – hiring designer Terry Stone to help her launch into motion picture titles, as well as market her typographic work as a separate venture called "Gravy Fonts." After working with clients across the entertainment industry, Chase decided that she was a print designer at heart and turned her attention to packaging design, stating, "What I like about designing print or packaging is that when the job is finished there is something physical to show for it – it's timeless. With the broadcast work, once it's been seen, it's already old."

Moving into the 2000s Chase, under the auspices of the Chase Design Group (formed 1997), previously known as Margo Chase Design (formed 1986), tackled branding and packaging for such varied clients as CVS, Procter & Gamble, Califia Farms, and others.

== Personal life ==
Chase had a keen interest in piloting and aerobatics. Introduced to the sport through her father, she likened it to drawing in the sky. In 2008, Chase married Patrick Dugan, her flight instructor. An active member of the International Aerobatics Club, she participated in many club competitions. She died on July 22, 2017, after the plane she was piloting crashed near Apple Valley, California.

== Awards and accolades ==
Chase received numerous awards and accolades throughout her career. Graphic Design USA named her as one of the "most influential graphic designers of the era," placing her in the company of Saul Bass, Massimo Vignelli, and Paula Scher. The magazine also listed her eponymous studio among the "most influential design firm[s] of the era."
