= The California Aggie =

American newspaper

- Type: Student newspaper
- Format: Broadsheet
- Owner: The Associated Students of UC Davis
- Founded: 1915
- Language: English
- Headquarters: 25 Lower Freeborn; UC Davis; Davis, California, United States
- Circulation: 4,000 (weekly)
- Website: theaggie.org//
- Free online archives: cdnc.ucr.edu (1915–2014)

The California Aggie is a weekly newspaper distributed in the Davis, California, area. It is staffed entirely by UC Davis students and is the official campus newspaper.

== History ==
The California Aggie was first published in 1915 as the Weekly Agricola after its approval by the Associated Student Executive Committee. At this point, UC Davis was considered the University Farm, an extension of UC Berkeley. Students from UC Berkeley's paper, The Daily Californian, advised the Weekly Agricola during its beginning months.

Initially, the Weekly Agricola was focused on both student news and farming-related topics. Novelist Jack London was one of the first readers of the Weekly Agricola. In 1922, it was renamed to match the school's athletic name.

The Aggie ceased production of its Friday issues in February 2009, moved to a weekly format in 2013 to reduce operating costs, and was published online-only until September 2016, when it returned to a weekly print edition.
