= I Don't Wanna Live My Life Like You =

Single by John Sykes

from the album Out of My Tree
- Released: 1995
- Genre: Hard rock
- Length: 3:11
- Label: Mercury Music Entertainment
- Songwriter(s): John Sykes
- Producer(s): John Sykes

John Sykes singles chronology
"Please Don't Leave Me" (1982)	"I Don't Wanna Live My Life Like You" (1995)

"I Don't Wanna Live My Life Like You" is a song by English hard rock musician John Sykes. It was released in 1995 by Mercury Records' Japanese branch as the first single from his debut solo album Out of My Tree. The song was described by Sykes as having a 1970s punk rock-vibe with rebellious lyrics. Sykes jokingly stated that the song is a reflection of his own life with his neighbours.

== Track listing ==
All songs written and composed by John Sykes.

CD (1995)

No.	Title	Length
1.	"I Don't Wanna Live My Life Like You"	3:11
2.	"Jelly Roll" (live)	5:10
3.	"She Knows" (live)	5:06
4.	"Standing at the Crossroads" (live)	4:09
Total length:		17:36

== Personnel ==
Credits are adapted from the liner notes.

Musicians

- John Sykes – guitar, vocals
- Marco Mendoza – bass, backing vocals
- Tommy O'Steen – drums, backing vocals
