= John Sykes =

British guitarist (1959–2024)

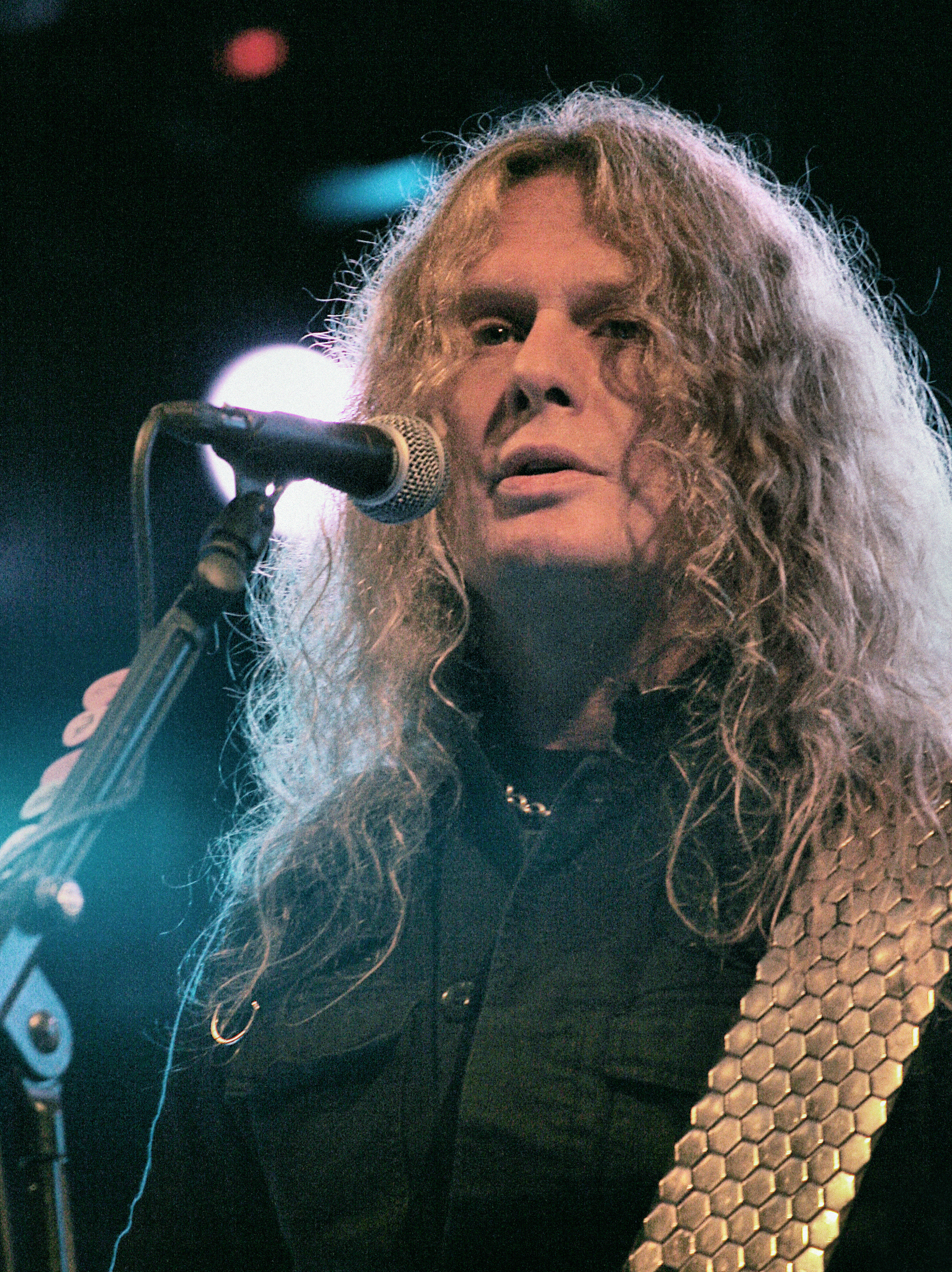
- Sykes in 2008

Background information
- Born: John James Sykes; 29 July 1959; Reading, Berkshire, England
- Died: 21 December 2024 (aged 65)
- Genres: Hard rock; heavy metal; glam metal
- Occupations: Musician; singer; songwriter
- Instruments: Guitar; vocals
- Years active: 1980–2024
- Formerly of: John Sloman; Tygers of Pan Tang; Thin Lizzy; Whitesnake; Blue Murder
- Spouse: Jennifer Brooks (m. 1989; div. 1999)
- Website: johnsykes.com

Signature
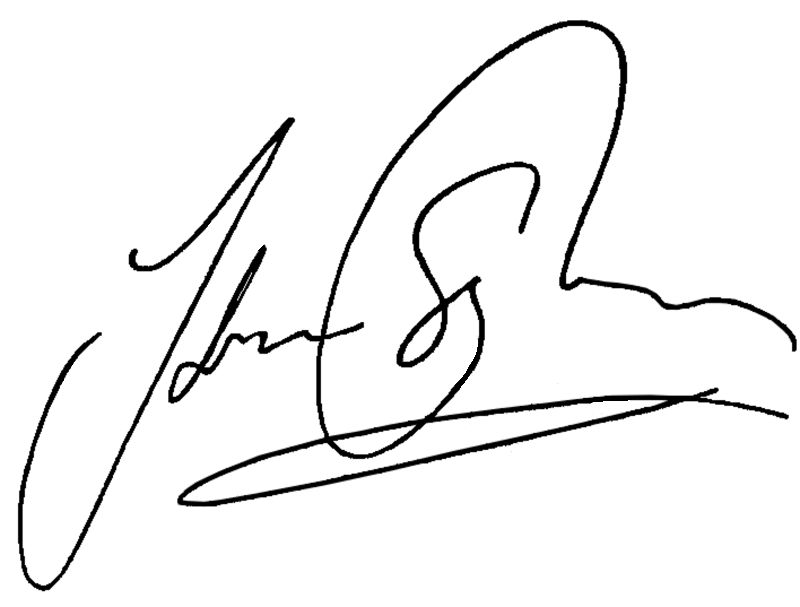

John James Sykes (29 July 1959 – 21 December 2024) was an English guitarist and singer, best known as a member of Whitesnake, Thin Lizzy and Tygers of Pan Tang. He also fronted the hard rock group Blue Murder and released several solo albums.

Following a stint in the heavy metal band Tygers of Pan Tang in the early 1980s, Sykes joined Irish hard rock group Thin Lizzy for their 1983 album Thunder and Lightning. He then joined Whitesnake with whom he recorded the multi-platinum-selling self-titled 1987 album. However, Sykes was fired from the band before the record's release under acrimonious circumstances, which led to him forming his own group, Blue Murder. After two albums and a live record, he embarked on a solo career. For the remainder of the 1990s and early 2000s, Sykes split his time between his solo career and a reformed Thin Lizzy, which he fronted until 2009, when he left to focus on his solo career.

Influenced by the likes of Jimmy Page, Ritchie Blackmore and Gary Moore, Sykes was known for his distinctive playing style, characterised by his wide fret-hand vibrato, use of pinch harmonics and sense of melody. In 2004, he was included on Guitar World's list of "100 Greatest Heavy Metal Guitarists of All Time". In 2006, Gibson released a limited line of John Sykes Signature Les Pauls, which were modelled after his 1978 Gibson Les Paul Custom.

== Early life ==
John James Sykes was born 29 July 1959 in Reading, Berkshire. The Sykes family spent three years living in Ibiza, Spain, where John's father and uncle owned a discothèque. Afterward, they moved back to Reading.

At age 14, Sykes took an interest in the guitar when his uncle showed him how to play some of Eric Clapton's licks. For the next two years, he practised playing blues songs on an old nylon-string guitar. Upon returning to Reading, Sykes entered a relationship and essentially gave up the guitar for a year and a half. After moving to Blackpool, Sykes resumed playing and was asked to join the band Streetfighter by his friend Mervyn Goldsworthy, who would later play bass in Diamond Head, Samson and FM.

== Career ==
=== Early career ===
Sykes made his recording debut on the Streetfighter track "She's No Angel", which appeared on the New wave of British heavy metal compilation New Electric Warriors in 1980. Afterwards, he left Streetfighter to join Tygers of Pan Tang. Sykes recorded two albums with the group, Spellbound and Crazy Nights, which were both released in 1981. By the following year, however, Sykes had grown frustrated with the band as he and vocalist Jon Deverill would often butt heads with the other members. Additionally, he felt the group lacked both the style and dedication to achieve major success. Sykes left Tygers of Pan Tang in early 1982, two days before the start of a French tour. However, he appears on two tracks on the band's fourth album The Cage, which was released after he had already departed.

After leaving Tygers of Pan Tang, Sykes auditioned for Ozzy Osbourne's band and was briefly a member of John Sloman's Badlands. Despite a few shows and Sloman procuring a recording contract with EMI, the group ultimately broke-up.

=== Thin Lizzy ===
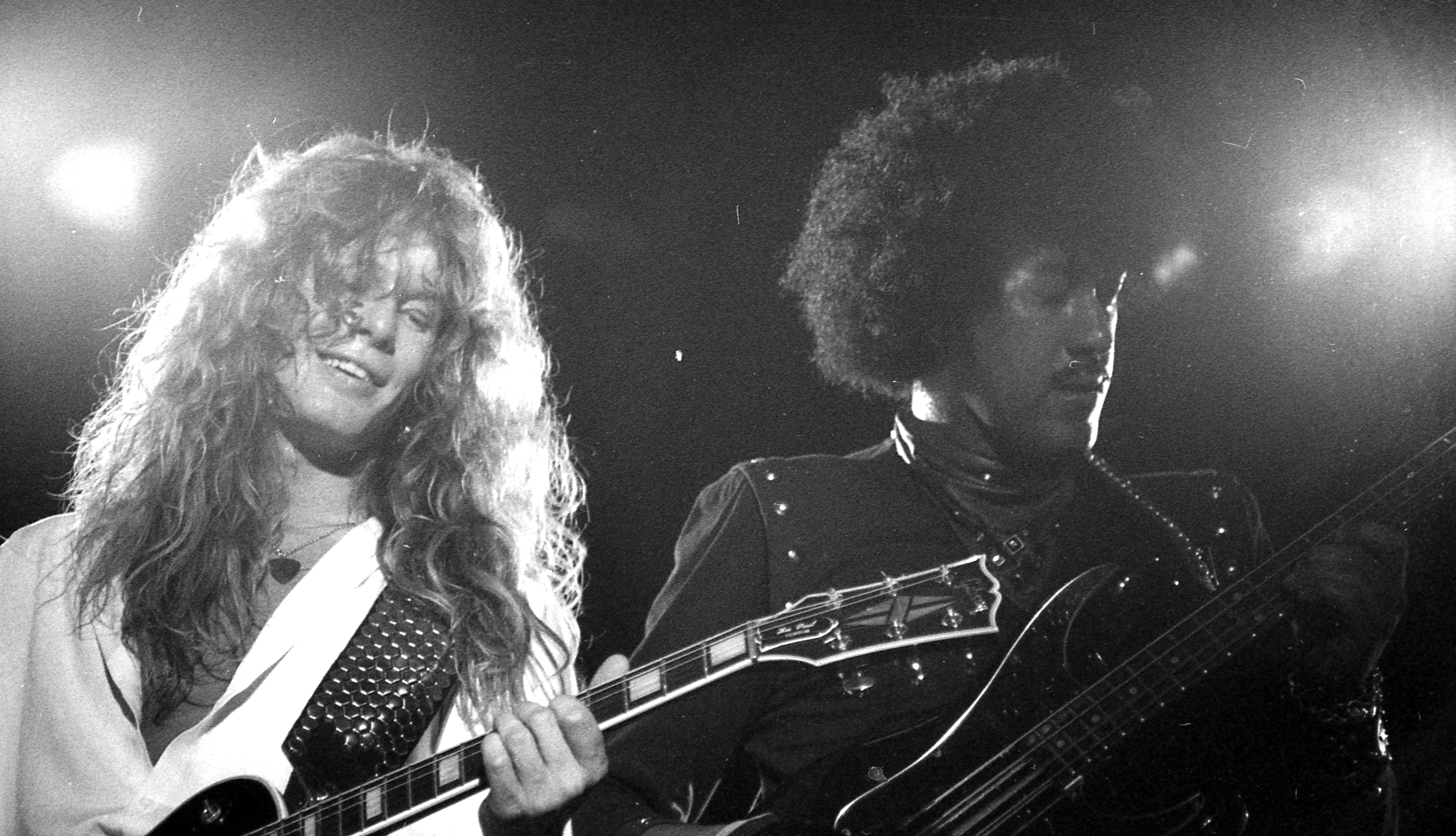
Sykes (left) and Phil Lynott (right) performing with Thin Lizzy at the 1983 Reading Festival.

After his departure from Tygers of Pan Tang, Sykes was still contractually obligated to deliver a single to the band's label MCA Records. Through Tygers of Pan Tang producer Chris Tsangarides, Sykes got in touch with Thin Lizzy frontman Phil Lynott. The two co-wrote and performed the single "Please Don't Leave Me", which was released in 1982. The track also featured fellow Thin Lizzy members Brian Downey and Darren Wharton. Afterwards, Sykes was asked to join Thin Lizzy. He was officially confirmed as the band's new guitarist in September 1982, replacing previous guitarist Snowy White, who had quit the band one month earlier. Sykes performed on the group's 1983 album Thunder and Lightning, for which he also co-wrote the single "Cold Sweat". Sykes's inclusion helped revitalise the band, steering them towards a sound more akin to heavy metal. The supporting tour for Thunder and Lightning was billed as Thin Lizzy's farewell tour, though Sykes and Lynott were eager to continue further. During the tour, the band recorded the live album Life. Sykes also accompanied Lynott on a European solo tour. Thin Lizzy played their final UK concert at the Reading Festival in August 1983, before finally disbanding after a show at Nuremberg's Monsters of Rock festival on 4 September.

Phil Lynott died on 4 January 1986, aged 36. In 1994, Sykes along with former Thin Lizzy members Brian Downey, Scott Gorham and Darren Wharton, formed a new touring version of Thin Lizzy, which was presented as a tribute to Phil Lynott's life and work. While the band only performed songs from Thin Lizzy's back catalogue and did not compose any new material, they were still criticised for using the Thin Lizzy name without Lynott. In 2000, the group released the live album One Night Only. Sykes continued to front Thin Lizzy through various line-up changes before announcing his own departure in 2009, stating: "I feel it's time to get back to playing my own music." Scott Gorham would later reform Thin Lizzy without Sykes's involvement.

=== Whitesnake ===
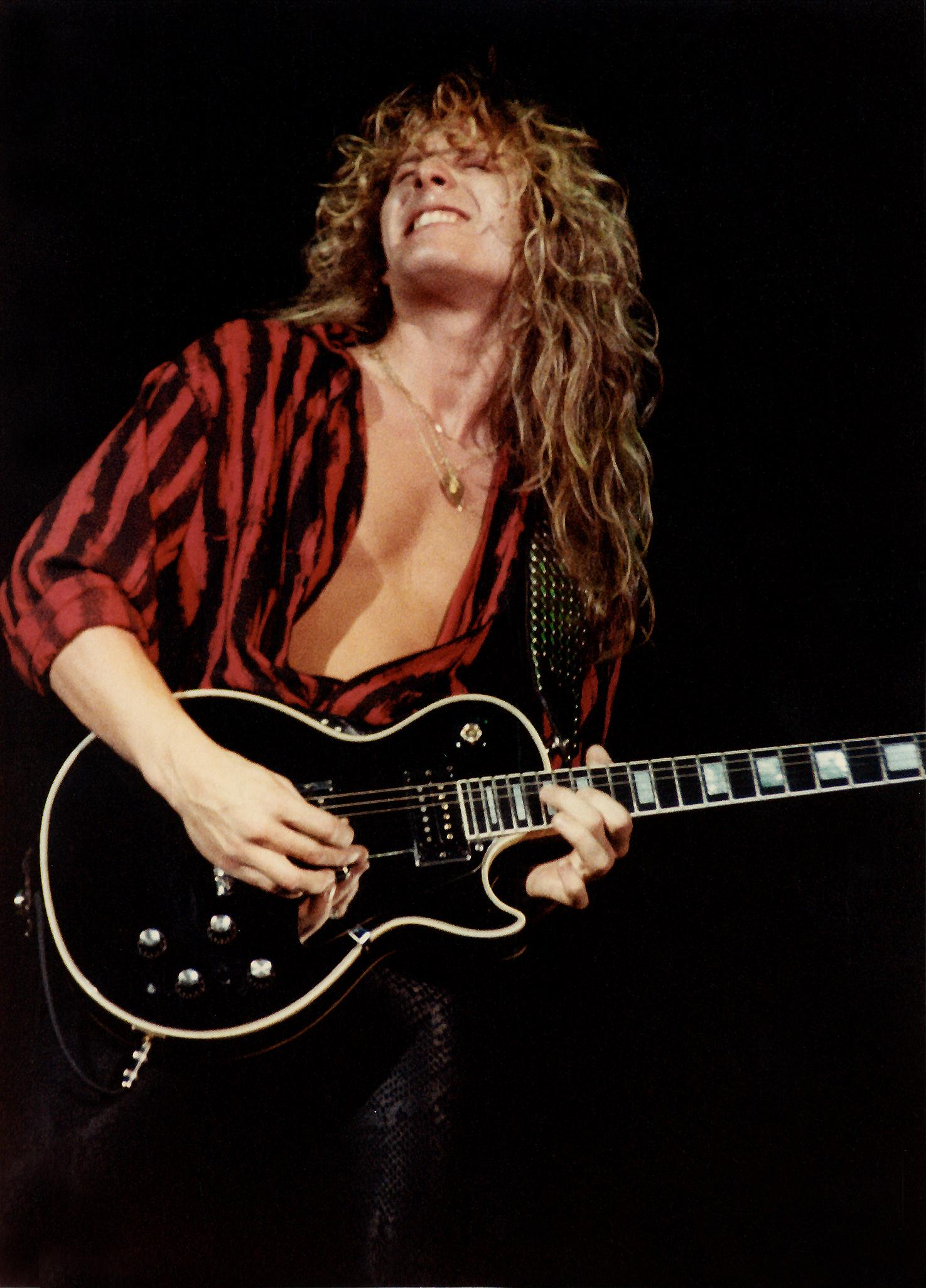
Sykes performing with Whitesnake at the Oakland Coliseum in 1984.

After Thin Lizzy's break-up, Sykes was initially keen to continue working with Phil Lynott in what would become Grand Slam. However, he was soon asked to join English hard rock group Whitesnake, whom he had met while on tour with Thin Lizzy. After negotiating a satisfactory contract and receiving Lynott's blessing, Sykes agreed to join the band. He was then tasked with recording new guitar parts for the US release of Whitesnake's 1984 album Slide It In. The record became the group's first major success in the United States, selling over half a million copies. Sykes played a key role in this newfound success, with a more vibrant look and sound compared to the band's previous guitar players. He made his live debut with the group in Dublin on 17 February 1984. Afterwards, Whitesnake embarked on a lengthy world tour, which culminated in two shows at the 1985 Rock in Rio festival.

Sykes was heavily involved in the making of Whitesnake's next album, co-writing the majority of the songs with vocalist David Coverdale. The two began in the South of France in early 1985, before heading to Little Mountain Sound Studios in Vancouver to begin recording. Sykes pushed the band towards a more mainstream sound, described by Coverdale as "leaner, meaner and more electrifying". As recording progressed though, Coverdale's relationship with the rest of the group began to sour and he summarily fired all the other members, including Sykes. When Whitesnake's seventh album was released in April 1987, it became the band's most commercially successful release to date, reaching number two on the Billboard 200 chart and selling over eight million copies in the US.

Since leaving Whitesnake, Sykes's relationship with Coverdale remained strained, feeling "very bitter" about how Coverdale handled his firing. In the early 2000s, there was a "reaching out" between the two as Coverdale was putting together a new Whitesnake line-up. By his account, Sykes recommended Marco Mendoza and Tommy Aldridge to the band (both of whom would end up joining), after which he never heard from Coverdale again. Mendoza claimed to have acted as a mediator of sorts between the two. Coverdale acknowledged speaking with Sykes about a possible reunion, but ultimately decided that the two had been "their own bosses" too long for it to work. In 2017, Sykes said of Coverdale: "I really have no interest in ever talking to him again."

=== Blue Murder ===
Following his dismissal from Whitesnake, Sykes formed Blue Murder, which featured bassist Tony Franklin and drummer Carmine Appice. Initially, drummer Cozy Powell and vocalist Ray Gillen were tapped to the project. The former eventually left to join Black Sabbath, while latter was let go after Geffen Records' A&R executive John Kalodner encouraged Sykes to front the band himself.

Blue Murder's self-titled debut album was released in April 1989, reaching number 69 on the Billboard 200 chart. The band then embarked on a tour across America and Japan. While their debut album would go on to sell an estimated 500,000 copies according to Sykes, Blue Murder's success fell short of both the band's and the label's expectations. Sykes felt Geffen Records did not promote the group properly, stating: "I think they were trying to get me and David [Coverdale] back together. They wanted me to get back with the 'winning formula'. But the wounds were too fresh. I stayed with the same label. In hindsight, I would have done better with a different label."

During the recording of Blue Murder's sophomore album, Franklin and Appice left the group; they were replaced by Marco Mendoza and Tommy O'Steen, respectively. At the same time, Sykes was in consideration to join Def Leppard. While no formal auditions took place, Sykes did jam with them and sang backing vocals on their 1992 album Adrenalize. Ultimately Def Leppard would hire Vivian Campbell, who incidentally had replaced Sykes in Whitesnake five years prior. Blue Murder, meanwhile, released their second album Nothin' But Trouble in August 1993. It failed to chart outside of Japan, which Sykes once again attributed to Geffen Records, who he felt "didn't do anything" to promote the record. In 1994, Blue Murder released a live album, Screaming Blue Murder: Dedicated to Phil Lynott, after which they were dropped from their label and broke up.

There were several attempts to reunite Blue Murder since the band's break-up. In 2019, Carmine Appice stated that the group had rehearsed together, but Sykes wanted to tour under the moniker John Sykes & Blue Murder, which Appice was unwilling to do. In 2020, Appice stated that he and Sykes had once again talked about the possibility of a Blue Murder reunion, but nothing ultimately came of the conversation.

=== Solo career ===
After parting ways with Geffen Records in 1994, Sykes signed with the Japanese branch of Mercury Records and released his first solo album Out of My Tree in August 1995. This was followed up by Loveland and 20th Century, which were released in 1997. The former had originally been commissioned by Mercury as an extended play of ballads, while the latter served as a companion record to dispel accusations that Sykes had "gone soft". All three albums charted in Japan. Following the release Nuclear Cowboy in 2000, Sykes attempted to procure a European release for his solo albums through Z Records. When this didn't materialise he signed a deal with Burnside Distribution in 2003, which made his solo catalogue available in the US for the first time. In 2005, Sykes released the live album Bad Boy Live!. According to guitarist Richard Fortus, Sykes also auditioned for Guns N' Roses in 2009.

During an appearance on That Metal Show in 2011, Sykes revealed he was forming a new band with drummer Mike Portnoy. Also attached to the project was bassist Billy Sheehan. However, Eddie Trunk confirmed in 2012 that the project, tentatively titled Bad Apple, was no longer moving forward. According to Trunk, Sykes was "not on the same timetable" as Portnoy and Sheehan. Sykes was later replaced by Richie Kotzen and the group became the Winery Dogs.

In 2013, Sykes revealed he was working on a new solo album. Samples from the record were released in 2014 and Sykes discussed it in a 2017 interview with Young Guitar Magazine. In January 2019, it was announced that Sykes had signed a recording contract with Golden Robot Records with the intent of releasing the album that same year. However, in November 2019, Sykes announced that he had ended his partnership with Golden Robot Records. On 1 January 2021, Sykes released "Dawning of a Brand New Day", his first new song in over 20 years. This was followed up by "Out Alive" in July.

In January 2026, Golden Robot announced plans to release a posthumous EP containing four tracks later that year. However, his estate condemned the announcement and said that they had not authorised the release of any material. In response, Golden Robot issued a statement, asserting that the release was "fully permitted under John's recording agreement, and reflects the shared intention, held while he was with us, to complete and present this material properly". "My Guitar" was released to digital platforms on February 13, 2026, followed by "Believe In Yourself" on 12 June 2026. In September, Sykes's estate reaffirmed their position on the matter, disclosing that the estate had requested Golden Robot provide them with copies of the alleged agreements being relied upon, but that the label had yet to deliver said documents. The EP, titled One Way, was nevertheless released on 6 November.

== Personal life and death ==
Sykes married Jennifer Brooks-Sykes on 10 April 1989 after four years of living together. They divorced in 1999. Sykes had three sons: James, John Jr. and Sean. Following Sykes's death, his friend and radio personality Eddie Trunk stated that Sykes had been in a relationship "for decades" with a woman named Kim.

On 20 January 2025, it was announced via a statement on his social media and website that Sykes had died from cancer; his official website indicated that he died in December 2024, at the age of 65. On 21 December 2025, a one-year commemoration was posted on his official website, indicating he died on 21 December 2024.

== Style and legacy ==
Sykes listed Jimmy Page, Ritchie Blackmore, Gary Moore, Michael Schenker, Uli Jon Roth, Allan Holdsworth and John McLaughlin among his biggest influences. He regarded himself as a "blues player that plays rock". Some of the main characteristics of Sykes's playing were his fast alternate picking, doubled‐note lines, wide fret-hand vibrato, pinch harmonics and tapping. Former White Wizzard guitarist Will Wallner also highlighted Sykes's sense of melody. Likewise, Alter Bridge's Myles Kennedy described Sykes as a "soulful player with chops balancing technique and emotion". Jackson Maxwell, writing for Guitar World, noted how Sykes "could go full-throttle with the most impressive speedsters, but [...] will be best known as a player who shone brightest when showcasing his other talents."

Sykes has been cited as an influence by Michael Amott, Courtney Cox, Marty Friedman, Myles Kennedy, Michael Sweet, and Rich Ward, among others. In 2004, Sykes was included on Guitar World's list of the "100 Greatest Heavy Metal Guitarists of All Time". In 2011, he was included on Guitar Player's list of "50 Unsung Heroes of the Guitar". Guitar Player also highlighted Sykes in their 2021 article "How '80s Guitar Heroes Changed Hard Rock Forever" as one of the quintessential hard rock guitarists of the 1980s. Following Sykes's death, Forbes magazine's Quentin Thane Singer wrote: "While Sykes didn't see the same worldwide recognition as other like-minded 1980s guitar heroes [...] his musical contributions to the genre and capabilities as a guitarist are no less significant."

== Equipment ==
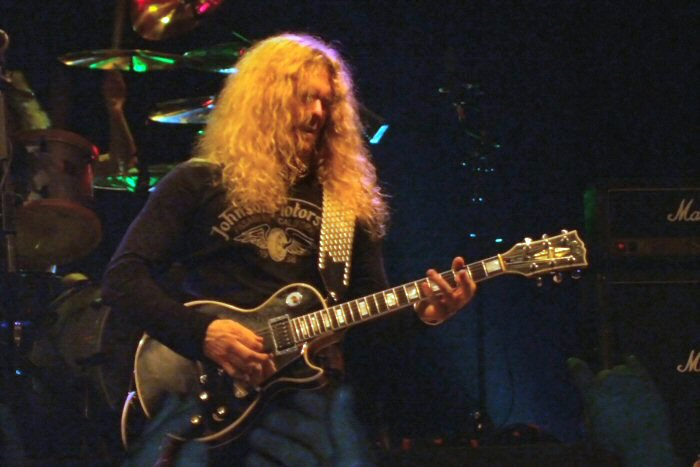
Sykes performing in 2007 with his 1978 Gibson Les Paul Custom

Sykes's main guitar for most of his career was a 1978 Gibson Les Paul Custom. The guitar was fitted with chrome hardware (which were added at Phil Lynott's suggestion), Grover tuners and a brass nut. It featured a Gibson Dirty Fingers pick-up in the bridge position, which was later swapped out for a Gibson PAF reissue. In 2006, Gibson produced a limited number of Les Pauls based on Sykes's model. The line quickly sold out.

On Loveland, Sykes mainly used a 1959 Gibson Les Paul Sunburst, which is also featured on the cover. For clean tones, he often used a 1961 Fender Stratocaster. When he first joined Thin Lizzy, Sykes used a 1977 Gibson Les Paul Custom as a backup guitar. His other backups included a 1959 Gibson Les Paul reissue from 1985 and a 1991 Gibson Les Paul Classic Goldtop. Sykes's collection of guitars also included signature models from Jimmy Page, Gary Rossington, Joe Satriani and Eddie Van Halen, a white Gibson Les Paul Custom from the early 1970s, a 1956 Gibson Les Paul Goldtop, and a 1965 Fender Telecaster, among many others. Sykes used Ernie Ball strings, gauge .010 to .046, and Dunlop 1.14mm Tortex picks.

For much of Whitesnake's 1987 album and the first Blue Murder record, Sykes used two Mesa/Boogie Coliseum heads with Mark III pre-amp sections and six 6L6 power tubes. During Blue Murder's later tours, Sykes used a Mesa/Boogie Dual Rectifier, before switching to Marshall JCM800s. Later he used EVH 5150 III amplifiers and cabinets. During live performances, Sykes used a variety of rack‐mounted chorus and delay effects. During his first stint with Thin Lizzy, Sykes used a Boss chorus pedal, which was retired after Whitesnake bassist Neil Murray complained it was too noisy.

== Discography ==
=== Solo albums ===
- Out of My Tree (1995)
- Loveland (1997)
- 20th Century (1997)
- Nuclear Cowboy (2000)
- Bad Boy Live! (2004)
- One Way (2026)

=== with Tygers of Pan Tang ===
- Spellbound (1981)
- Crazy Nights (1981)
- The Cage (1982) (Note: Sykes only appears on the tracks "Love Potion No. 9" and "Danger in Paradise".)

=== with Thin Lizzy ===
- Thunder and Lightning (1983)
- Life (1983)
- One Night Only (2000)

=== with Whitesnake ===
- Slide It In (1984) (Note: Sykes only appears on the US remix of Slide It In.)
- Whitesnake (1987)

=== with Blue Murder ===
- Blue Murder (1989)
- Nothin' but Trouble (1993)
- Screaming Blue Murder: Dedicated to Phil Lynott (1994)

=== Other appearances ===
Year	Artist	Album	Track(s)	Credits	Ref(s)
1980	Streetfighter	New Electric Warriors	"She's No Angel"	Guitar	
1992	Def Leppard	Adrenalize	—N/a	Backing vocals	
1996	Various artists	Crossfire: Salute to Stevie Ray	"Pride and Joy"	Guitar	
1998	Various artists	Merry Axemas 2 – More Guitars for Christmas	"God Rest You Merry, Gentlemen"	Guitar, producer, mixer	
2001	Phil Lynott	Live in Sweden 1983	All tracks	Guitar, backing vocals	
2002	Hughes Turner Project	HTP	"Heaven's Missing an Angel"	Guitar, backing vocals	
2004	Derek Sherinian	Mythology	"God of War"	Guitar	
2016	Rick Wakeman, Tony Ashton	Gastank	"Growing Up", "The Man's a Fool"	Guitar	
2018	Various artists	Moore Blues for Gary: A Tribute to Gary Moore by Bob Daisley and Friends	"Still Got the Blues"	Guitar	
