= Blue Murder (band) =

English rock band (1987–1994)

- Blue Murder in 1989. Left to right: Tony Franklin, John Sykes, and Carmine Appice.

Background information
- Genres: Hard rock; heavy metal; glam metal
- Years active: 1987–1994
- Label: Geffen
- Spinoff of: Whitesnake
- Past members: John Sykes; Cozy Powell; Tony Franklin; Ray Gillen; Carmine Appice; Tony Martin; Anders Johansson; Marco Mendoza; Tommy O'Steen; Nik Green; Kelly Keeling

Blue Murder were an English hard rock band led by guitarist-vocalist John Sykes. The group was formed in 1987 following Sykes's dismissal from Whitesnake. The initial line-up was rounded out by bassist Tony Franklin and drummer Carmine Appice. In its nascent stage, vocalist Ray Gillen and drummer Cozy Powell were attached to the project. In 1989, Blue Murder released their self-titled debut album, which cracked the Billboard 200 chart and spawned a minor hit with "Jelly Roll". Nevertheless, the record proved to be a financial disappointment for both the band and their label Geffen Records.

By the early 1990s, Blue Murder's style of music had fallen out of fashion with the popularity of grunge. Coupled with the slow progress on a follow-up album, Franklin and Appice chose to leave the band, leaving Sykes to put together a new line-up. In 1993, Blue Murder released Nothin' But Trouble, which failed to chart outside of Japan. After a live album the following year, Blue Murder were dropped by their record label and broke-up. In the years since, there were numerous failed attempts to reunite the band until Sykes' death in 2024.

Despite their limited commercial success, Blue Murder and their first album in particular have accumulated a small cult following.

== History ==
=== Formation and debut album (1987–1989) ===
In 1986, guitarist John Sykes was fired from the English hard rock group Whitesnake by vocalist David Coverdale. Sykes had just finished recording the band's eponymous album, which would go on to achieve multi-platinum status. He returned to his home in Blackpool, England, where he began writing new songs. In February 1987, he started putting together a new group. Drummer Cozy Powell was the first to join, having played with Sykes in Whitesnake from 1984 to 1985. Next came bassist Tony Franklin, formerly of The Firm, and lastly vocalist Ray Gillen, who had previously fronted Black Sabbath for a short time.

After solidifying their initial line-up, the band recorded some demos and sent them to Geffen Records with whom Sykes had previously worked with as a member of Whitesnake. Prior to this, Sykes had sent Geffen his first demo recordings, which featured him on lead vocals. As it happened, Geffen's A&R executive John Kalodner preferred Sykes's vocals to Gillen's, who were having disagreements over the songs' musical and vocal approach. Eventually, Gillen left after only a few months in the band. In mid-1987, the group signed with Geffen Records, but as they began searching for a new lead singer, Cozy Powell abruptly left in early 1988 to join Black Sabbath, having grown frustrated with the band's slow progress. They were then approached by drummer Carmine Appice, who had previously played with Rod Stewart, Vanilla Fudge and King Kobra, among others. Also in the running was former Journey drummer and Sykes's ex-Whitesnake bandmate Aynsley Dunbar, but ultimately the job went to Appice. In January 1988, former Black Sabbath vocalist Tony Martin had been chosen as the band's new lead singer, but as they were about leave for Vancouver to record their debut album, Martin pulled out. The rest of the group decided to soldier on, figuring they could always find a singer later.

In February 1988, the band began recording their debut album with producer Bob Rock. At the same time, they continued to audition singers, among them David Glen Eisley and Derek St. Holmes. Unable to find a singer that satisfied all parties, the band and John Kalodner persuaded Sykes to sing lead vocals. At Franklin's suggestion, the band were dubbed Blue Murder, after the British idiom "scream blue murder". Their debut album, eponymously titled Blue Murder, was released on 24 April 1989. It debuted at number 172 on the Billboard 200 chart, eventually peaking at number 69 in June 1989. On the UK Albums Chart, it reached number 45. The record received positive reviews, with Raw's Paul Suter giving it a ten out of ten rating and calling it one of "the finest records in an age". The single "Jelly Roll" also proved to be a minor hit, reaching number fifteen on the Album Rock Tracks chart. In support of their debut album, Blue Murder toured America supporting Bon Jovi and Billy Squier, with additional headline dates in America and Japan.

While their debut album would go on to sell an estimated 500,000 copies by Sykes's account, Blue Murder's success fell short of expectations. Carmine Appice stated that the decision to release "Valley of the Kings" as the band's first music video was a mistake, as it was deemed too long and not "commercial enough" for MTV. The song was also not available for purchase as a single, something Franklin felt hurt its success on MTV. Due to the failure of "Valley of the Kings", MTV refused to play the follow-up video "Jelly Roll", which Franklin felt prevented it from becoming a crossover hit. Additionally, Sykes felt that Geffen did not properly promote the band, stating: "I think they were trying to get me and David [Coverdale] back together. They wanted me to get back with the 'winning formula'. But the wounds were too fresh. I stayed with the same label. In hindsight, I would have done better with a different label."

=== Decline and dissolution (1990–1994) ===
According to Appice and Franklin, Sykes was deeply affected by the failure of Blue Murder's debut album, which led to a prolonged period of inactivity. Meanwhile, grunge became popular in the mainstream, which left groups such as Blue Murder, as Franklin put it, "out of vogue". Though Sykes did eventually start work on a new album, progress was slow. This was partly due to Sykes producing the record himself for which he built an entirely new home studio. Appice grew tired of waiting and left the group in December 1990. He was briefly replaced by former Yngwie Malmsteen drummer Anders Johansson. Franklin announced his departure from Blue Murder in August 1991. Sykes then recruited bassist Marco Mendoza and drummer Tommy O'Steen to the group, while keyboardist Nik Green was promoted to a full-time member, having already played on the band's debut album. However, Franklin had already laid down tracks for Blue Murder's second album, while Carmine Appice was brought back briefly as a session drummer. Sykes also recruited former Baton Rouge vocalist Kelly Keeling as a second guitarist, but he reportedly left the band a day before shooting a new music video.

Blue Murder released Nothin' But Trouble on 31 August 1993. The record received positive reviews, though it was perceived by critics as a step-down from the band's debut. The single "We All Fall Down" reached number 35 on the Album Rock Tracks chart, but the record itself failed to chart outside of Japan. Sykes once again attributed this to Geffen, who he felt "didn't do anything" to promote the record. In 1994, the band released the live album Screaming Blue Murder: Dedicated to Phil Lynott, which was recorded in Tokyo. Having fulfilled their contractual obligations to their label, Blue Murder were dropped by Geffen. Sykes signed to Mercury Records in Japan, taking Mendoza and O'Steen with him to play in his solo band.

=== Failed reunion and Sykes's death (2000–2025) ===
There were numerous attempts to reunite Blue Murder over the years. According to Carmine Appice, he made several attempts to reunite the group between 2000 and 2012 to no avail. When asked in a 2001 interview if there will be another Blue Murder album, Sykes responded: "Maybe at some point there will be. I don't know." In 2019, Carmine Appice revealed that the group had rehearsed together, but Sykes wanted the band to tour under the moniker John Sykes & Blue Murder, something Appice was unwilling to do. In 2020, Appice stated that he and Sykes had once again talked about the possibility of a Blue Murder reunion, but nothing came of the conversation.

Any possibilities of a reunion were brought to an end when Sykes died after a battle with cancer at age 65, which was announced on his social media via a statement on 20 January 2025.

== Musical style and legacy ==
Blue Murder have been described by music critics as hard rock, heavy metal, and glam metal. Sykes described the band's sound in a 1989 interview with Raw as a combination of Whitesnake, Thin Lizzy and the blues. Speaking to Metal Shock, he referred to the group's sound as "heavy funk". With Blue Murder, Sykes sought to create a heavier record than Whitesnake's eponymous album, while still retaining much of the same groove and vibe. He would later speculate that this heaviness might have contributed to the album's low sales.

Despite Blue Murder's short lifespan, the band and their first album in particular have gained a small cult following. Radio and television personality Eddie Trunk highlighted the group in his 2011 book Eddie Trunk's Essential Hard Rock and Heavy Metal, while White Wizzard's Jon Leon named Blue Murder one of his favourite obscure heavy metal records of the 1980s. Alter Bridge's Myles Kennedy stated in 2014: "These days there’s a whole Brotherhood Of Blue Murder out there – musicians and crew guys who love this band. You’d be surprised how many of us there are." Eduardo Rivadavia of AllMusic remarked in his retrospective review of the band's first album how it has "endured far better than most similarly styled heavy metal albums of the era". He also touted the production as one of Bob Rock's best alongside his work with Metallica. Ultimate Classic Rock ranked Blue Murder the sixth best album produced by Bob Rock, while MetalSucks included it on a list of essential hair metal albums not included on a similar list by Rolling Stone.

== Band members ==
Former members

- John Sykes - lead vocals, guitar (1987–1994; died 2024)
- Cozy Powell - drums (1987–1988; died 1998)
- Tony Franklin - bass, backing vocals (1987–1991)
- Ray Gillen - lead vocals (1987; died 1993)
- Carmine Appice - drums, backing vocals (1988–1990, 1992)
- Tony Martin - lead vocals (1988)
- Anders Johansson - drums (1991)
- Marco Mendoza - bass, backing vocals (1991–1994)
- Tommy O'Steen - drums, backing vocals (1992–1994)
- Nik Green - keyboards (1991–1994; session and touring musician 1988–1990; died 2016)
- Kelly Keeling - backing and lead vocals, guitar (1991–1993)

== Discography ==
=== Studio albums ===
- Blue Murder (1989)
- Nothin' But Trouble (1993)

=== Live albums ===
- Screaming Blue Murder: Dedicated to Phil Lynott (1994)
