= Please Don't Leave Me (John Sykes song) =

Single by John Sykes
- Released: 1982
- Studio: Lombard Sound, Dublin, Ireland
- Genre: Soft rock
- Length: 4:51
- Label: MCA Records
- Songwriters: Phil Lynott, John Sykes
- Producer: Chris Tsangarides

John Sykes singles chronology
"Please Don't Leave Me" (1982)	"I Don't Wanna Live My Life Like You" (1995)

Professional ratings
Review scores
Source	Rating
AllMusic	link

"Please Don't Leave Me" is a song by English hard rock musician John Sykes. It was released in 1982 by MCA Records as his first solo single. It also features members of the Irish hard rock group Thin Lizzy, including frontman Phil Lynott, who co-wrote the track with Sykes.

After leaving his previous band Tygers of Pan Tang, Sykes was still contractually obligated to deliver a single to MCA Records. Having already written the instrumental for what was to become "Please Don't Leave Me", Sykes wanted to approach Thin Lizzy frontman Phil Lynott about a potential collaboration. Producer Chris Tsangarides, who had worked with both Tygers of Pan Tang and Thin Lizzy, acted as an intermediary. After listening to a demo, Lynott agreed to participate, bringing drummer Brian Downey and keyboardist Darren Wharton with him. The song was recorded at Lombard Studios in Dublin with Tsangarides producing. After the track was finished, Lynott asked Sykes to join Thin Lizzy, which he accepted.

"Please Don't Leave Me" was later repackaged with material Sykes had recorded with Tygers of Pan Tang and released as a compilation album in Japan on 16 December 1992. It reached number 49 on the Japanese charts. That same year, Danish hard rock group Pretty Maids covered the song on their album Sin-Decade (1992). The following year Pretty Maids recorded an acoustic version of the song for their album Stripped. Sykes would later re-record "Please Don't Leave Me" for his 1997 album Loveland, on which it was retitled "Don't Hurt Me This Way (Please Don't Leave Me '97)".

== Track listing ==
All songs written and composed by John Sykes and Phil Lynott, except where noted.

7" vinyl (1982)

No.	Title	Length
1.	"Please Don't Leave Me"	4:51
2.	"Please Don't Leave Me" (instrumental)	3:57
Total length:		8:48

CD (1992, Japan)

No.	Title	Writer(s)	Length
1.	"Please Don't Leave Me" (original version)		4:51
2.	"Don't Take Nothing"	Tygers of Pan Tang	2:52
3.	"Bad Times"	Tygers of Pan Tang	3:07
4.	"All or Nothing"	Steve Marriott, Ronnie Lane	2:44
5.	"Don't Give a Damn"	Tygers of Pan Tang	4:31
6.	"Please Don't Leave Me" (short version)		4:18
7.	"Slave to Freedom" (live)	Tygers of Pan Tang	5:02
8.	"Raised on Rock" (live)	Tygers of Pan Tang	4:44
9.	"Paradise Drive"	Tygers of Pan Tang	3:45
10.	"Love Potion No. 9" (7" mix)	Jerry Leiber, Mike Stoller	2:08
11.	"Please Don't Leave Me" (instrumental version)		3:57
Total length:			42:00

== Personnel ==
Credits are adapted from the liner notes.

Musicians

- John Sykes – guitar
- Phil Lynott – vocals, bass
- Brian Downey – drums
- Darren Wharton – keyboards

Production

- Chris Tsangarides – production, engineering
- John Swannell – photography

== Charts ==
Chart performance for Please Don't Leave Me1992 weekly chart performance for Please Don't Leave Me
Chart (1992)	Peak position
Japanese Albums (Oricon)	49
