= Sabaton discography =

Recordings by Swedish power metal band

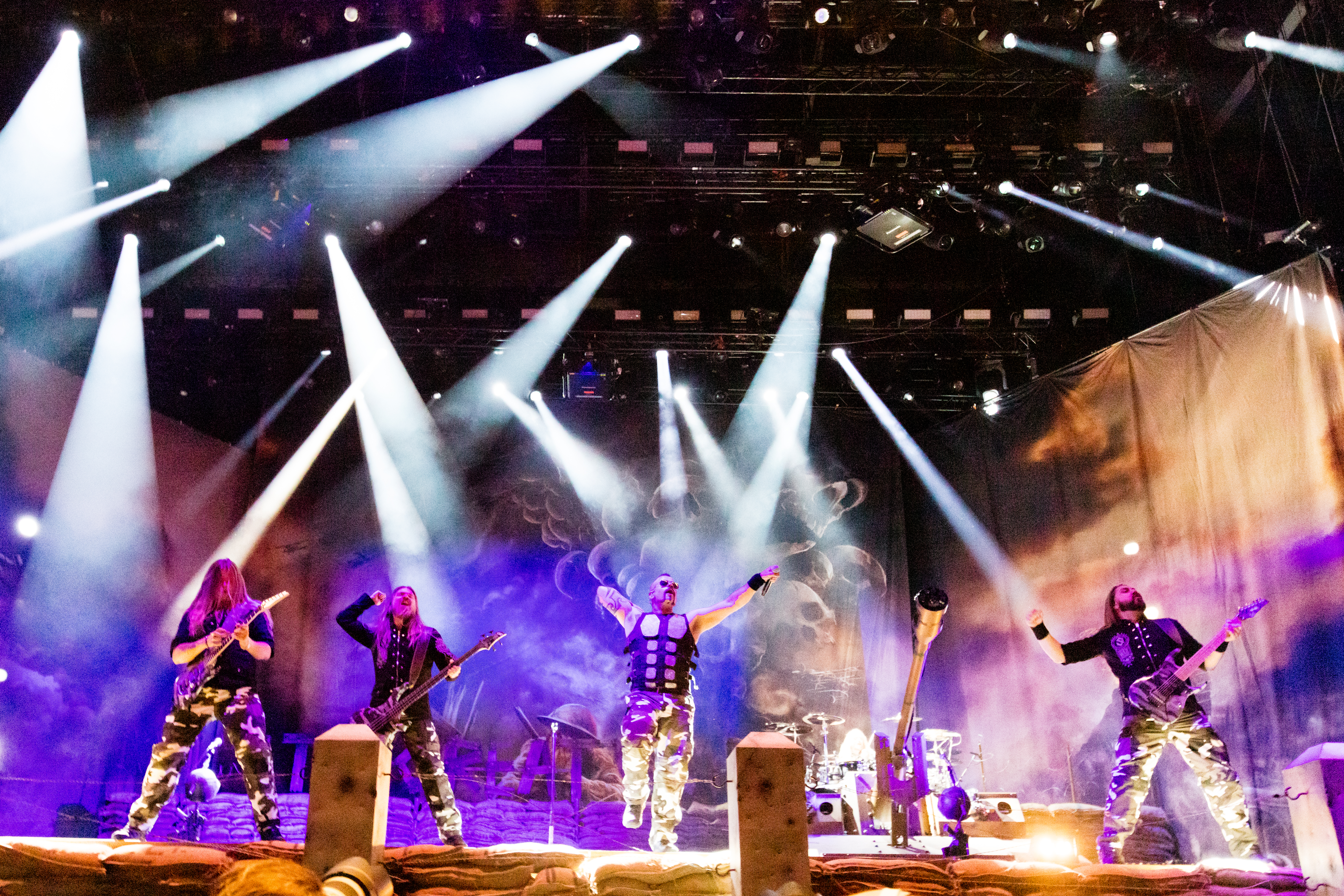
- Sabaton live at Wacken Open Air 2019
- Studio albums: 11
- Extended plays: 3
- Live albums: 4
- Compilation albums: 2
- Singles: 28
- Video albums: 5
- Music videos: 29

Sabaton is a power metal band from Falun, Sweden. As of 2025, they have released eleven studio albums, including Carolus Rex, which was recorded in separate Swedish and English versions, certified gold in Poland and platinum in Sweden with 40,000 album sales, making it "one of the most successful Swedish heavy metal albums ever" according to the band.

== Albums ==
=== Studio albums ===
Title	Album details	Peak chart positions									Certifications (sales thresholds)
Title	Album details	SWE	AUT	FIN	GER	NOR	SWI	POL	UK	US	Certifications (sales thresholds)
Primo Victoria	Released: 4 March 2005; Label: Black Lodge Records; Formats: CD, LP, digital download	43	—	—	—	—	—	—	—	—	
Attero Dominatus	Released: 28 July 2006; Label: Black Lodge Records; Formats: CD, LP, digital download	16	—	—	—	—	—	—	—	—	
Metalizer	Released: 16 March 2007; Label: Black Lodge Records; Formats: CD, LP, digital download	21	—	—	—	—	—	—	—	—	
The Art of War	Released: 30 May 2008; Label: Black Lodge Records; Formats: CD, LP, digital download	5	—	—	—	—	—	—	—	—	
Coat of Arms	Released: 21 May 2010; Label: Nuclear Blast; Formats: CD, LP, digital download	2	71	17	19	—	33	9	—	—	POL: Gold
Carolus Rex	Released: 23 May 2012; Label: Nuclear Blast; Formats: CD, LP, digital download	2	23	9	7	21	19	7	183	—	SWE: 4× Platinum; POL: Gold
Heroes	Released: 16 May 2014; Label: Nuclear Blast; Formats: CD, LP, digital download	1	11	2	3	13	7	6	59	99	SWE: Gold; FIN: Gold
The Last Stand	Released: 19 August 2016; Label: Nuclear Blast; Formats: CD, LP, digital download	1	2	1	2	11	1	2	17	63	POL: Gold
The Great War	Released: 19 July 2019; Label: Nuclear Blast; Formats: CD, LP, digital download	1	3	3	1	4	1	3	11	42	POL: Gold
The War to End All Wars	Released: 4 March 2022; Label: Nuclear Blast; Formats: CD, LP, digital download	1	1	1	1	2	4	1	16	87	
Legends	Released: 17 October 2025; Label: Better Noise; Formats: CD, LP, digital download	2	3	9	4	28	5	—	58	—	
"—" denotes releases that did not chart or were not released in that country.

=== Live albums ===
Title	Album details	Peak chart positions				Certifications (sales thresholds)
Title	Album details	SWE	SWI	GER	POL	Certifications (sales thresholds)
World War Live: Battle of the Baltic Sea	Released: 5 August 2011; Label: Nuclear Blast; Formats: CD, CD+DVD, LP, digital download	26	62	26	9	POL: Gold
Swedish Empire Live	Released: 23 September 2013; Label: Nuclear Blast; Formats: CD, LP, digital download	—	—	17	—	
Heroes on Tour	Released: 4 March 2016; Label: Nuclear Blast; Formats: CD, LP, digital download	—	99	8	—	
The Great Show	Released: 1 December 2021; Label: Nuclear Blast; Formats: digital download	—	—	—	—	
"—" denotes releases that did not chart or were not released in that country.

=== Video albums ===
Title	Album details	Peak chart positions	
Title	Album details	SWE	FIN
World War Live: Battle of the Baltic Sea	Released: 5 August 2011; Label: Nuclear Blast; Formats: CD+DVD	—	—
Swedish Empire Live	Released: 23 September 2013; Label: Nuclear Blast; Formats: DVD, Blu-ray	1	1
Heroes on Tour	Released: 4 March 2016; Label: Nuclear Blast; Formats: DVD, Blu-ray	—	—
The Great Show	Released: 19 November 2021; Label: Nuclear Blast; Formats: DVD, Blu-ray, digital download	—	—
20th Anniversary Show	Released: 19 November 2021; Label: Nuclear Blast; Formats: DVD, Blu-ray	—	—
"—" denotes releases that did not chart or were not released in that country.

=== Compilation albums ===
Title	Album details	
Fist for Fight	Released: 2000; Label: Underground Symphony; Formats: CD	
Metalus Hammerus Rex	Released: 18 April 2012; Label: Nuclear Blast; Formats: CD	Metal Hammer magazine insert

== Extended plays ==
Title	EP details	Peak chart positions	
Title	EP details	SWE	FIN
Weapons of the Modern Age	Released: 30 September 2022; Label: Nuclear Blast; Formats: Digital download, streaming	34	37
Heroes of the Great War	Released: 20 January 2023; Label: Nuclear Blast; Formats: Digital download, streaming	—	—
Stories from the Western Front	Released: 14 April 2023; Label: Nuclear Blast; Formats: Digital download, streaming, CD	—	—

== Singles ==
Year	Title	Peak chart positions						Album
Year	Title	SWE	US Hard Rock	US Hard Rock Digital	US Rock Digital	US Main. Rock	US Rock Air.	Album
2007	"Masters of the World"	—	—	—	—	—	—	Metalizer
2008	"Cliffs of Gallipoli"	1	—	—	—	—	—	The Art of War
2008	"40:1"	—	—	—	—	—	—	The Art of War
2010	"Coat of Arms"	17	—	—	—	—	—	Coat of Arms
2011	"Screaming Eagles"	—	—	—	—	—	—	Coat of Arms
2012	"The Lion from the North"	—	—	—	—	—	—	Carolus Rex
2012	"Carolus Rex"	—	—	—	—	—	—	Carolus Rex
2012	"In the Army Now"	—	—	—	—	—	—	Carolus Rex
2014	"To Hell and Back"	51	—	—	—	—	—	Heroes
2014	"Resist and Bite"	—	—	—	—	—	—	Heroes
2018	"82nd All the Way"	—	—	—	—	—	—	The Great War
2019	"Bismarck"	— (Note: "Bismarck" did not enter the Swedish Singellista Chart, but peaked at number nine on the Swedish Heatseeker Chart.)	—	5	15	—	—	Non-album single
2019	"Fields of Verdun"	—	—	—	—	—	—	The Great War
2019	"The Red Baron"	— (Note: "The Red Baron" did not enter the Swedish Singellista Chart, but peaked at number six on the Swedish Heatseeker Chart.)	—	—	—	—	—	The Great War
2019	"Great War"	—	—	—	—	—	—	The Great War
2020	"Angels Calling" (featuring Apocalyptica)	—	—	—	—	—	—	Non-album single
2020	"The Attack of the Dead Men" (Live in Moscow) (featuring Radio Tapok)	—	—	—	—	—	—	The Great War
2021	"Livgardet"	53	—	—	—	—	—	Carolus Rex
2021	"The Royal Guard"	— (Note: "The Royal Guard" did not enter the Swedish Singellista Chart, but peaked at number 10 on the Swedish Heatseeker Chart.)	—	25	—	—	—	Carolus Rex
2021	"Defence of Moscow"	94	15	4	22	—	—	Non-album singles
2021	"Kingdom Come"	—	—	20	—	—	—	Non-album singles
2021	"Steel Commanders" (featuring Tina Guo)	— (Note: "Steel Commanders" did not enter the Swedish Singellista Chart, but peaked at number 10 on the Swedish Heatseeker Chart.)	20	6	23	—	—	Non-album singles
2021	"Christmas Truce"	—	18	12	—	—	—	The War to End All Wars
2022	"Soldier of Heaven"	60	12	7	—	—	—	The War to End All Wars
2022	"The Unkillable Soldier"	89	20	—	—	—	—	The War to End All Wars
2022	"Race to the Sea"	93	—	—	—	—	—	The War to End All Wars
2022	"Stormtroopers"	86	17	—	—	—	—	The War to End All Wars
2022	"Father"	— (Note: "Father" did not enter the Swedish Singellista Chart, but peaked at number three on the Swedish Heatseeker Chart.)	—	8	23	—	—	Weapons of the Modern Age
2023	"The First Soldier"	—	—	15	—	—	—	Heroes of the Great War
2023	"1916"	—	—	11	—	—	—	Stories from the Western Front
2025	"Templars" (original or with Pop Evil)	72	24	4	11	—	—	Legends
2025	"Hordes of Khan"	— (Note: "Hordes of Khan" did not enter the Swedish Singellista Chart, but peaked at number 16 on the Swedish Heatseeker Chart.)	—	6	—	—	—	Legends
2025	"The Duelist"	—	—	—	—	—	—	Legends
2025	"Lightning at the Gates"	—	—	—	—	—	—	Legends
2025	"Crossing the Rubicon" (original or with Nothing More)	—	—	—	—	10	43	Legends
2025	"I, Emperor"	76	—	—	—	—	—	Legends
2026	"Yamato"	98	—	3	—	—	—	Yamato
2026	"Berserker"	—	—	—	—	—	—	Berserker
"—" denotes a recording that did not chart or was not released in that territory.

== Other charted songs ==
Year	Song	Peak chart positions	Album
Year	Song	SWE Heat.	Album
2022	"Dreadnought"	2	The War to End All Wars
2022	"Hellfighters"	14	The War to End All Wars
2022	"Lady of the Dark"	8	The War to End All Wars
2022	"The Valley of Death"	17	The War to End All Wars

== Music videos ==
Year	Title	Director	Album
2006	"Attero Dominatus"	—	Attero Dominatus
2006	"Metal Crüe"	—	Attero Dominatus
2008	"Cliffs of Gallipoli"	—	The Art of War
2009	"40:1"	Jacek Raginis	The Art of War
2010	"Uprising"	Jacek Raginis	Coat of Arms
2011	"Screaming Eagles"	Nicholas Dackard	Coat of Arms
2011	"Coat of Arms"	—	Coat of Arms
2014	"To Hell and Back"	Owe Lingvall	Heroes
2017	"Primo Victoria"	Zoran Bihac	Primo Victoria
2018	"The Last Stand"	—	The Last Stand
2019	"Bismarck"	Matthias Hoene	Non-album single
2019	"Fields of Verdun"	—	The Great War
2019	"Great War"	Christian Ripkens	The Great War
2019	"Angels Calling"	—	
2019	"Seven Pillars of Wisdom"	Mehdi Jouini	The Great War
2020	"Devil Dogs"	Christian Ripkens	The Great War
2020	"The Attack of the Dead Men"	Christian Ripkens	The Great War
2020	"Night Witches"	—	Heroes
2021	"Livgardet"	—	Non-album singles
2021	"The Royal Guard"	—	Non-album singles
2021	"Defence Of Moscow"	—	Non-album singles
2021	"Steel Commanders"	—	Non-album singles
2021	"Christmas Truce"	David Kočár	The War to End All Wars
2022	"Soldier of Heaven"	—	The War to End All Wars
2022	"The Unkillable Soldier"	—	The War to End All Wars
2022	"Race to the Sea"	—	The War to End All Wars
2022	"Stormtroopers"	—	The War to End All Wars
2022	"Father"	—	Weapons of the Modern Age
2023	"The First Soldier"	—	Heroes of the Great War
2023	"1916"	—	Stories from the Western Front
2025	"Templars"	Ivan Colic	Legends
2025	"Hordes of Khan"	Adam Barker	Legends
2025	"I, Emperor"	—	Legends
2025	"A Tiger Among Dragons"	Ivan Colic	Legends
2025	"Crossing the Rubicon"	Paolo Mantero	Legends
2026	"Yamato"	Olga Twighlight	Non-album single
