= Father (disambiguation) =

Father is the male parent of a child.

Father or The Father may also refer to:

== Name ==
- Daniel Fathers (born 1966), a British actor
- Father Yod (1922–1975), an American owner of one of the country's first health food restaurants

== Film and television ==
- Father (1966 film), a Hungarian film directed by István Szábo
- Father (1990 film), an Australian film directed by John Power
- Father (2000 film), a Chinese film directed by Wang Shuo
- Father (2011 film), a French film directed by Pasquale Squitieri
- Father (2020 film), a Serbian film directed by Srdan Golubović
- Father (2025 film), a Slovak-Czech-Polish film directed by Tereza Nvotová
- Father (2026 film), a Sri Lankan film directed by Chaminda Jayasuriya
- Fathers (film), a 2020 Cambodian film
- The Father (1979 film), a Bengali film by Kazi Hayat
- The Father (1996 film), an Iranian feature film by Majid Majidi
- The Father (2015 film), a Syrian drama film
- The Father (2019 film), a Bulgarian film directed by Kristina Grozeva and Petar Valchanov
- The Father (2020 film), a British film directed by French playwright Florian Zeller
- "Fathers" (Mare of Easttown), a 2021 television episode

== Literature and theatre ==
- "The Father," a short story by Raymond Carver from his collection Will You Please Be Quiet, Please?
- The Father (Dunlap play), a 1789 play by William Dunlap
- The Father (Strindberg play), an 1887 play by Swedish playwright August Strindberg
- The Father (Osborne play), a 1989 play by English playwright John Osborne
- The Father (Zeller play), a 2012 play by French playwright Florian Zeller
- The Fathers (novel), a 1938 novel by Allen Tate
- Fathers (book), a collection of 49 personal father essays and poems
- Father (Fullmetal Alchemist), the main antagonist of the Fullmetal Alchemist manga and 2009 anime

== Music ==
=== Bands and artists ===
- Earl Hines, "Fatha", influential jazz pianist
- Father (rapper), an American rapper
- Father MC, African American rapper
- Father (band), a Croatian heavy metal band

=== Songs ===
- "Father" (Kanye West song), 2026
- "Father" (LL Cool J song), 1997
- "Father" (Ms. Dynamite song), 2005
- "Father", by Amy Grant from her album Amy Grant, 1977
- "Father", by Bizzy Bone from his album The Gift, 2001
- "Father", by Calibretto 13 from their album Adventures in Tokyo, 2002
- "Father", by Cat Stevens from his album Back to Earth, 1978
- "Father", by Dala from Best Day, 2012
- "Father", by Demi Lovato from their album Confident, 2015
- "The Father", by Godflesh from their album Purge, 2023
- "Father", by In Hearts Wake from their EP Skydancer, 2015
- "Father", by Manowar from their album Thunder in the Sky, 2009
- "Father", by Mötley Crüe from their EP Quaternary, 1994
- "Father", by Pillar from their album Above, 2000
- "Father", by Sabaton from their EP Weapons Of The Modern Age, 2022
- "Father", by Jim Legxacy from his mixtape Black British Music (2025)

== Society ==
- Father (honorific)

== Religion ==
- God the Father, in many religions, the supreme God given the title and attributions of a father
- Holy Father (disambiguation)
- Father, style (manner of address) for a clergyman, especially a priest
- Church Fathers, early and influential theologians, eminent Christian teachers and great bishops

== Places ==
- Father Lake (Doda Lake tributary), a waterbody in Québec, Canada`

== See also ==
- Parent-in-law, father-in-law or mother-in-law, a person who has a legal affinity with another by being the parent of the other's spouse.
- Father of the Nation
- Father of the House, in some parliaments, its longest serving member
- Founding Fathers
- Father Time, a personification of time
- List of people considered father or mother of a field
- Name of the Father, which relates to the psychoanalytic concept of the Father
