= Primo Victoria =

2005 studio album by Sabaton

Studio album by Sabaton
- Released: 4 March 2005 (original edition); 24 September 2010 (Re-Armed edition)
- Recorded: August–November 2004
- Studios: The Abyss (Ludvika, Sweden) Polar Studios, Stockholm, Sweden
- Genre: Power metal
- Length: 41:05
- Label: Black Lodge Records
- Producer: Tommy Tägtgren

Sabaton chronology
Fist for Fight (2000)	Primo Victoria (2005)	Attero Dominatus (2006)

Primo Victoria (Latin for "Victory First") is the debut studio album by the Swedish power metal band Sabaton.

The band had previously recorded the full-length album Metalizer with Italian label Underground Symphony, but due to conflicts its release was delayed until 2007. Primo Victoria instead became Sabaton's debut album, recorded in 2004 in Abyss Studios, and released the following year with their new label, Black Lodge Records.

In 2010 the album was re-released on German label Nuclear Blast, with six additional bonus tracks, under the name Primo Victoria Re-Armed. The re-release reached 43rd place in the Swedish album charts.

== Lyrics ==
Sabaton used themes of war history in Primo Victoria, a style they have continued ever since. According to singer Joakim Brodén, he and bass player Pär Sundström had written the music for the title track, but were missing lyrics. Because they felt the song had a "big sound", they wanted a big subject, and chose the allied invasion of Normandy during World War II. Having to do some research on the historic events, they decided they liked the meaning that the subject added to the song, and decided to give the whole album a war history theme.

== Track listing ==
All music is composed by Brodén.

No.	Title	Lyrics	Theme	Length
1.	"Primo Victoria"	Brodén, Sundström	The Normandy landings from the Allied perspective	4:10
2.	"Reign of Terror"	Brodén, Sundström	The Gulf War and Saddam Hussein	3:51
3.	"Panzer Battalion"	Brodén	Operation Iraqi Freedom and the American armored battalion that led the invasion	5:09
4.	"Wolfpack"	Brodén	Wolfpack Hecht's attack on Convoy ON 92	5:55
5.	"Counterstrike"	Brodén, Sundström	The Six-Day War from the Israeli perspective	3:48
6.	"Stalingrad"	Brodén	The Battle of Stalingrad from the Soviet perspective	5:18
7.	"Into the Fire"	Brodén, Sundström	The use of napalm in the Vietnam War from the American perspective	3:25
8.	"Purple Heart"	Sundström	The Purple Heart, a U.S. military decoration awarded to killed or wounded service personnel in the name of the President	5:07
9.	"Metal Machine"	Brodén	A tribute to heavy metal using song titles from other bands, as well as some risqué humor	4:22
Total length:				41:05

Re-armed edition bonus tracks
No.	Title	Writer(s)	Length
10.	"The March to War"		1:21
11.	"Shotgun"	Brodén	3:14
12.	"Into the Fire (Live in Falun 2008)"	Brodén, Sundström	4:08
13.	"Rise of Evil (Live in Falun 2008)"	Brodén	8:03
14.	"The Beast" (Twisted Sister cover)	Dee Snider	3:11
15.	"Dead Soldier's Waltz"		1:21
Total length:			21:18

== Personnel ==
- Joakim Brodén – lead vocals and keyboard
- Rickard Sundén – guitar and backing vocals
- Oskar Montelius – guitar and backing vocals
- Pär Sundström – bass guitar
- Daniel Mullback – drums

== "Second Battalion" and "Amphibious Battalion" ==
The band was commissioned by members of the Norwegian Army 2nd Battalion to make an alternative version of Panzer Battalion. The alternate version, called Second Battalion, differs only in that the lyric "Second Battalion" is sung in place of "Panzer Battalion".

The band also later created another alternate version of Panzer Battalion named Amphibious Battalion for the Swedish marines fighting in Chad as a part of EUFOR.

== Covers ==
- German a cappella metal group Van Canto covered "Primo Victoria" on their fourth studio album Break the Silence in 2011, with Sabaton frontman Joakim Brodén appearing as a guest vocalist and in the music video.

== Cross-promotion with Wargaming ==
As part of Nuclear Blast's 30th anniversary, in 2017, Sabaton announced through their website that they were beginning a long-term collaboration with Wargaming. The band stated they often play World of Tanks between shows. This collaboration resulted in the filming of a music video for the song "Primo Victoria", as well as the custom-painted Swedish Army Strv 81 featured in the video being made available for purchase in World of Tanks.

== Charts ==
Chart (2010)	Peak position
Swedish Albums (Sverigetopplistan)	43
