= Hannes Van Dahl =

Swedish drummer

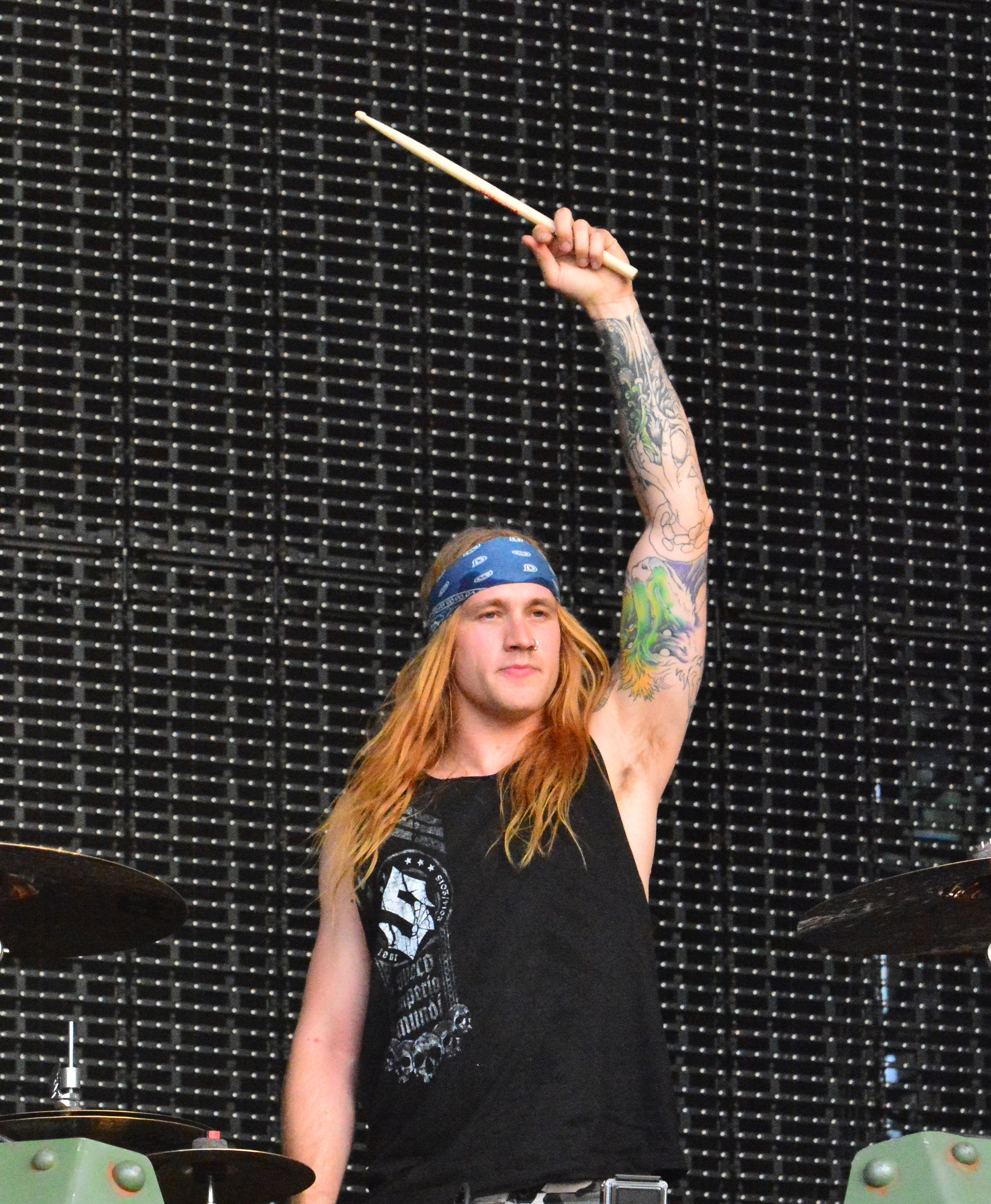
- Dahl performing with Sabaton at Wacken Open Air 2015

Background information
- Born: Karl-Hannes Dahl; 18 January 1990 (age 36); Skövde, Sweden
- Genre: Power metal
- Occupation: Musician
- Instrument: Drums
- Years active: 2009–present
- Member of: Sabaton
- Spouse: Floor Jansen

Hannes Van Dahl (born Karl-Hannes Dahl, 18 January 1990) is a Swedish musician, best known as the drummer of the power metal band Sabaton.

== Biography ==
Dahl changed his name to "Hannes Van Dahl" as an adult. His interest in rock and metal music came from the skateboarding scene and a big inspiration was his cousin who played in a local band and his mother playing records to him from young age. At the age of 10 he started playing the bass guitar, but quickly lost interest and moved on to the drums. His first band was called "The Motherfuckers".

Later, Van Dahl started the band Downthrust and ended this engagement to join Evergrey in 2009 while replacing Jonas Ekdahl. Van Dahl's drumming teacher Snowy Shaw, after seeing the potential in him, recommended Van Dahl for Evergrey. During Shaw's engagement as Sabaton drummer, Van Dahl joined him as a drum tech for four shows.

After a rehearsal in The Abyss, Van Dahl joined Sabaton as an official band member during the Swedish Empire Tour in 2013. In 2014, Sabaton released the album Heroes, which was the first album Van Dahl recorded with the band.

Van Dahl is married to former Nightwish singer Floor Jansen. They have two daughters, born in 2017 and 2023, respectively. Together with former Sabaton member Tommy Johansson, and current members Thobbe Englund and Chris Rörland, he was in the band The Last Heroes.

== Discography ==
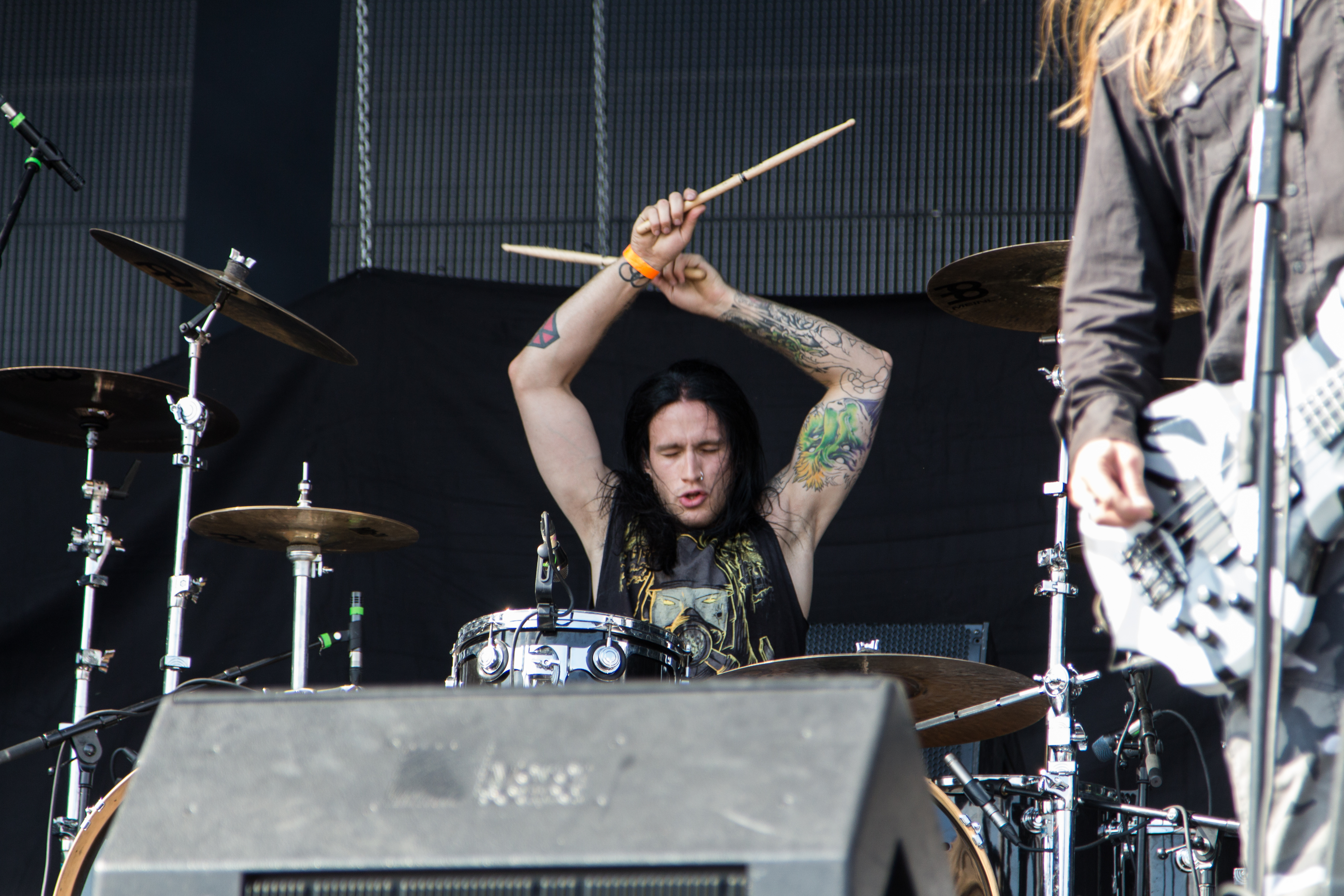
Van Dahl performing in 2014

=== With Evergrey ===
- Glorious Collision (2011)

=== With Sabaton ===
- Heroes (2014)
- Heroes on Tour (2016)
- The Last Stand (2016)
- The Great War (2019)
- The War to End All Wars (2022)
- Legends (2025)

=== As a guest ===
- With Biff Byford, Eric Peterson, Cecilia Nappo and Jay Jay French: Spin the Wheel (2021)
