= Carolus Rex (album) =

2012 studio album by Sabaton

Studio album by Sabaton
- Released: 25 May 2012
- Recorded: October 2011 – January 2012
- Studios: The Abyss (Pärlby, Sweden)
- Genre: Power metal
- Length: 45:09
- Label: Nuclear Blast
- Producers: Sabaton, Peter Tägtgren

Sabaton chronology
Coat of Arms (2010)	Carolus Rex (2012)	Heroes (2014)

Singles from Carolus Rex
- 1. "Carolus Rex" Released: 8 April 2012; 2. "The Lion from the North" Released: 25 May 2012

Limited edition cover

Platinum edition cover

Professional ratings
Review scores
Source	Rating
Encyclopaedia Metallum	8.3/10 stars
Metal Storm	8.25/10 stars
About.com	4.5/5 stars

Carolus Rex is the sixth studio album by the Swedish power metal band Sabaton. It is a concept album based on the rise and fall of the Swedish Empire, whose monarch Charles XII gives it its title. It was released with both English and Swedish vocals. It is the last album to feature guitarists Oskar Montelius and Rikard Sundén, drummer Daniel Mullback and keyboardist Daniel Mÿhr. It was produced by Peter Tägtgren in Abyss Studios. The album received critical acclaim and commercial success, achieving gold certification in Poland and quadruple platinum in Sweden.

In 2015, four Carolus Rex songs were featured in the Sabaton Soundtrack DLC for the historical grand strategy game Europa Universalis 4 by Paradox Interactive. The four included with the DLC were "The Lion from the North", "A Lifetime of War", "The Carolean's Prayer", and "Carolus Rex". Another song ("The Art of War") from Sabaton's The Art of War album was also included.

Streaming versions of the album have retroactively added the 2021 single "The Royal Guard"/"Livgardet" to the tracklist between "Poltava" and "Long Live the King"/"Konungens Likfärd."

== Reception ==
As of 18 September 2012, the album is certified gold in Sweden, selling over 30,000 copies (20,000 copies sold is needed for an album to be certified gold in Sweden). As of March 2013, the album is also certified gold in Poland. On 18 June 2013, Carolus Rex was certified platinum in Sweden with 40,000 album sales, making it the "most successful Swedish heavy metal album ever" according to the band.

On 28 September 2018, Sabaton announced that the album had been awarded quadruple platinum status after remaining on the Swedish chart for 326 weeks, and commemorated this with a number of limited edition versions and merchandise. These were set for release on 30 November 2018, the 300th anniversary of the death of Charles XII.

In 2019, Metal Hammer ranked it as the 20th best power metal album of all time.

== Track listing ==
No.	Title	Lyrics	Music	Theme	Length
1.	"Dominium Maris Baltici" ("Dominion of the Baltic Sea")				0:29
2.	"The Lion from the North"	Joakim Brodén, Pär Sundström	Brodén	Gustavus Adolphus of Sweden	4:42
3.	"Gott mit uns" ("God with Us")	Brodén, Sundström	Brodén	The 1631 battle of Breitenfeld	3:15
4.	"A Lifetime of War"	Brodén, Sundström	Brodén	The misery caused by the Thirty Years' War	5:45
5.	"1648"	Brodén, Sundström	Brodén	The 1648 battle of Prague	3:54
6.	"The Carolean's Prayer"	Brodén	Brodén	The Caroleans	6:14
7.	"Carolus Rex" ("King Charles")	Brodén, Sundström	Brodén, Ken Kängström	The crowning of Charles XII of Sweden, his belief in the Divine Right of Kings and the Great Northern War.	4:53
8.	"Killing Ground"	Brodén, Sundström	Brodén, Kängström	The battle of Fraustadt	4:24
9.	"Poltava"	Sundström	Brodén	The defeat in the battle of Poltava	4:03
10.	"Long Live the King"	Brodén, Sundström	Brodén	The death and funeral procession of Charles XII	4:09
11.	"Ruina Imperii" ("Downfall of the Empire")	Brodén, Sundström	Brodén	The Carolean Death March and the fall of the Swedish Empire	3:21
Total length:					45:09

Bonus tracks
No.	Title	Length
12.	"Twilight of the Thunder God" (Amon Amarth cover, limited edition and platinum edition only)	3:59
13.	"In the Army Now" (Bolland & Bolland cover)	3:59
14.	"Feuer frei!" (Rammstein cover)	3:12
15.	"Harley from Hell" (Originally an exclusive on the compilation album Metalus Hammerus Rex, re-released on the platinum edition)	3:50
Total length:		60:09

A Swedish language edition of the album is also available.

Swedish edition track list
No.	Title	Length
1.	"Dominium Maris Baltici"	0:29
2.	"Lejonet från Norden" ("The Lion from the North")	4:42
3.	"Gott mit uns"	3:15
4.	"En Livstid i Krig" ("A Lifetime of War")	5:44
5.	"1648"	3:55
6.	"Karolinens Bön" ("The Carolean's Prayer")	6:14
7.	"Carolus Rex"	4:54
8.	"Ett Slag Färgat Rött" ("A Battle Coloured Red")	4:24
9.	"Poltava"	4:03
10.	"Konungens Likfärd" ("The King's Funeral Procession")	4:09
11.	"Ruina Imperii" ("Downfall of the Empire")	3:21
Total length:		45:10

The limited 2-CD mail order edition of the album includes the English version with all of the bonus tracks and the Swedish version, as well as alternate artwork.

== Covers ==
- Fellow Falun-based metal band Follow the Cipher, which includes Carolus Rex contributing songwriter Ken Kängström, covered "Carolus Rex" on their 2018 self-titled debut album. Metal Injection's review of the album noted Linda Toni Grahn's version of the vocals sounded "more haunting".
- German metal band Feuerschwanz released a cover of "Gott mit uns" for their 2020 studio album "Das Elfte Gebot".

== Personnel ==
=== Band members ===
- Joakim Brodén – lead vocals
- Pär Sundström – bass
- Oskar Montelius – guitars, backing vocals
- Rikard Sundén – guitars, backing vocals
- Daniel Mÿhr – keyboards, backing vocals
- Daniel Mullback – drums

=== Guest musicians ===
- Peter Tägtgren – vocals on "Gott mit uns" and "Twilight of the Thunder God", guitar solo on "Twilight of the Thunder God"

== Charts ==
Chart (2012)	Peak position
Austrian Albums (Ö3 Austria)	23
Belgian Albums (Ultratop Flanders)	67
Belgian Albums (Ultratop Wallonia)	99
Dutch Albums (Album Top 100)	90
Finnish Albums (Suomen virallinen lista)	9
German Albums (Offizielle Top 100)	7
Norwegian Albums (VG-lista)	21
Swedish Albums (Sverigetopplistan)	2
Swiss Albums (Schweizer Hitparade)	19
UK Rock & Metal Albums (Official Charts)	8
UK Independent Albums (Official Charts)	30
US Heatseekers Albums (Billboard)	30

== Certifications ==
Region	Certification	Certified units/sales
Poland (ZPAV)	Gold	10,000^{*}
Sweden (GLF)	4× Platinum	120,000^{‡}
^{*} Sales figures based on certification alone.^{‡} Sales+streaming figures based on certification alone.
