= Chris Rörland =

Swedish guitarist

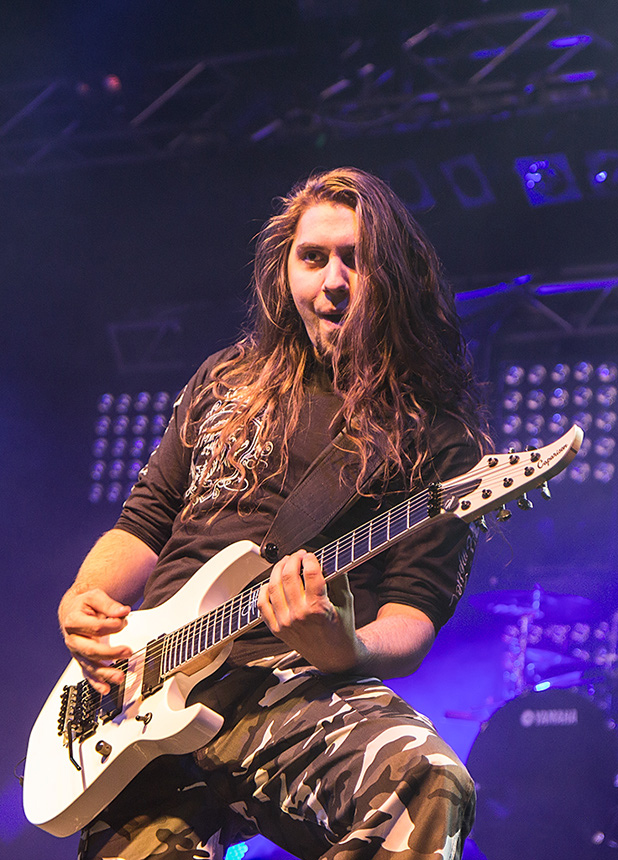
Rörland with Sabaton in 2012

Chris Rörland (born 27 December 1986) is a Swedish guitarist. Before joining power metal band Sabaton in 2012, he played in TME and Nocturnal Rites.

== Biography ==
Rörland started at the age of seven to play the guitar. He names Adrian Smith, John Petrucci, Steve Vai and Yngwie Malmsteen as his major influences.

In 2010, Rörland became guitarist of the power metal band Nocturnal Rites. In 2012, he and Thorbjörn (Thobbe) Englund replaced Sabaton’s former guitarists, Rikard Sundén and Oskar Montelius. Rörland is in a relationship. He did his military service as a munition driver.

Together with former Sabaton member Tommy Johansson, and current members Thobbe Englund and Hannes Van Dahl, he was in the band The Last Heroes.

== Discography ==
=== Sabaton ===
- 2014: Heroes
- 2016: The Last Stand
- 2018: The Great War
- 2022: The War to End All Wars
- 2025: Legends

=== Guest ===
- 2008: with Cronan: Enterprise (lead guitar on tracks 3, 7, 8)
- 2013: with Thobbe Englund: Fingerspitzengefühl in From the Wilderness (guitar solo)
- 2017: with Nocturnal Rites: Before We Waste Away in Phoenix (song writer)
- 2018: with Follow the Cipher: Follow the Cipher (lead and rhythm guitar)

== Graphic designer ==
- 2015: for Thobbe Englund – From the Wilderness
- 2016: for Sabaton – The Last Stand (text formation and layout)
- 2016: for Thobbe Englund – Before the Storm
- 2018: for Thobbe Englund – The Draining of Vergelmer (graphic design, text formation and layout)
- 2018: for Follow the Cipher – Follow the Cipher
- 2019: for Majestica – Above the Sky
