= Legends (Sabaton album) =

2025 studio album by Sabaton

Studio album by Sabaton
- Released: 17 October 2025
- Recorded: 2024
- Studio: Black Lounge Studios
- Genre: Power metal
- Length: 45:42
- Label: Better Noise
- Producer: Jonas Kjellgren

Sabaton chronology
The War to End All Wars (2022)	Legends (2025)

Singles from Legends
- 1. "Templars" Released: 25 April 2025; 2. "Hordes of Khan" Released: 6 June 2025; 3. "The Duelist" Released: 25 July 2025; 4. "Lightning at the Gates" Released: 25 July 2025; 5. "Crossing the Rubicon" Released: 12 September 2025; 6. "I, Emperor" Released: 17 October 2025; 7. "A Tiger Among Dragons" Released: 10 November 2025

Legends is the eleventh studio album by the Swedish power metal band Sabaton. It was released on 17 October 2025. The album covers multiple stories of prominent figures and events in history, including the Knights Templar during the Crusades, Genghis Khan's invasions and conquests, and Hannibal's crossing of the Alps, among others. It also is the first Sabaton album to feature Thobbe Englund as a band member since their 2016 album The Last Stand.

== Background and promotion ==
The album's first single, "Templars", was released on 25 April 2025, under the band's new contract with indie rock/metal label Better Noise Music, although the album was completed before the band moved to the label. On 6 June 2025, the band released the next single titled "Hordes of Khan". Two more singles were released on 25 July 2025, "The Duelist" and "Lightning at the Gates". On 12 September 2025, a fourth single, "Crossing the Rubicon" was released, featuring the band's Better Noise Music labelmates, Nothing More; this guest version was not published on the album. On 17 October 2025, the day the album was released, the single and music video for the song, "I, Emperor" was also released. Later, they released the single and music video for the song “A Tiger Among Dragons” on 10 November 2025. In the year following the albums release, a music video for the song “Till Seger” was released on 21 November 2026, promoting their 2027 Grand Swedish Arena Tour.

On 6 November 2026, Sabaton announced a deluxe edition of Legends, scheduled to be released on 5 March 2027, featuring 3 new songs, “Berserker”, “Champion of Christ”, and “To Glory”, a full symphonic version of the album, the song “Crossing The Rubicon” featured with Nothing More, and the song “Templars” featured with Pop Evil. “Berserker” had been released as a single on the day of the announcement.

== Track listing ==
Legends track listing
No.	Title	Lyrics	Music	Theme	Length
1.	"Templars"	Joakim Brodén; Pär Sundström	Brodén	The trials and dissolution of the Knights Templar	4:54
2.	"Hordes of Khan"	Sundström	Brodén	The invasions and conquests led by Genghis Khan	3:43
3.	"A Tiger Among Dragons"	Sundström	Brodén; Lars Torbjörn Englund; Chris Rörland	Life of Lü Bu	4:06
4.	"Crossing the Rubicon"	Brodén	Brodén; Kenny Lars Kängström	The crossing of the Rubicon River led by Julius Caesar	3:29
5.	"I, Emperor"	Brodén; Sundström	Brodén	Life of Napoleon Bonaparte	4:16
6.	"Maid of Steel"	Sundström	Brodén	Life of Joan of Arc	3:17
7.	"Impaler"	Brodén	Brodén; Chris Rörland	Life of Vlad the Impaler	4:44
8.	"Lightning at the Gates"	Brodén; Sundström	Brodén; Englund	The crossing of the Alps led by Hannibal	4:12
9.	"The Duelist"	Brodén	Brodén	Life of Miyamoto Musashi	3:55
10.	"The Cycle of Songs"	Brodén	Brodén; Jonas Kjellgren	Life of Senusret III	5:39
11.	"Till Seger"	Sundström	Brodén; Hannes Van Dahl	Life of Gustavus Adolphus and the rise of the Swedish Empire	3:27
Total length:					45:42

== Personnel ==
Credits adapted from Tidal.

=== Sabaton ===
- Joakim Brodén – lead vocals, backing vocals, keyboards
- Chris Rörland – guitars, backing vocals
- Thobbe Englund – guitars, backing vocals
- Pär Sundström – bass
- Hannes Van Dahl – drums

=== Additional contributors ===
- Joakim Brodén – production
- Pär Sundström – production
- Chris Rörland – production
- Thobbe Englund – production
- Jonas Kjellgren – mixing, mastering, engineering
- Hannele Junkala – backing vocals
- Marie-Louise Strömqvist – backing vocals
- Mia Mullback – backing vocals
- Sofia Lundberg – backing vocals
- Scott Tunnix – narration and additional sound effects on Storyteller Edition

== Charts ==
=== Weekly charts ===
Weekly chart performance for Legends
Chart (2025)	Peak position
Australian Albums (ARIA)	14
Austrian Albums (Ö3 Austria)	3
Belgian Albums (Ultratop Flanders)	9
Belgian Albums (Ultratop Wallonia)	37
Dutch Albums (Album Top 100)	16
Finnish Albums (Suomen virallinen lista)	9
French Albums (SNEP)	121
French Rock & Metal Albums (SNEP)	10
German Albums (Offizielle Top 100)	4
German Rock & Metal Albums (Offizielle Top 100)	2
Japanese Rock Albums (Oricon)	18
Japanese Top Albums Sales (Billboard Japan)	83
Japanese Western Albums (Oricon)	19
Norwegian Albums (IFPI Norge)	28
Norwegian Rock Albums (IFPI Norge)	2
Polish Albums (ZPAV)	2
Scottish Albums (Official Charts)	18
Swedish Albums (Sverigetopplistan)	2
Swedish Hard Rock Albums (Sverigetopplistan)	1
Swiss Albums (Schweizer Hitparade)	5
UK Albums (Official Charts)	58
UK Independent Albums (Official Charts)	4
UK Rock & Metal Albums (Official Charts)	2
US Top Hard Rock Albums (Billboard)	21
US Independent Albums (Billboard)	47
US Top Album Sales (Billboard)	15
US Indie Store Album Sales (Billboard)	11

=== Year-end charts ===
Year-end chart performance for Legends
Chart (2025)	Position
German Albums (Offizielle Top 100)	100
