= The Great War (Sabaton album) =

2019 studio album by Sabaton

Studio album by Sabaton
- Released: 19 July 2019
- Recorded: November 2018 – February 2019
- Genre: Power metal
- Length: 38:27
- Label: Nuclear Blast
- Producer: Sabaton

Sabaton chronology
The Last Stand (2016)	The Great War (2019)	The War to End All Wars (2022)

Singles from The Great War
- 1. "Fields of Verdun" Released: 3 May 2019; 2. "The Red Baron" Released: 13 June 2019; 3. "Great War" Released: 27 June 2019; 4. "82nd All the Way" Released: 20 July 2019; 5. "The Attack of the Dead Men (feat. Radio Tapok)" Released: 10 May 2020

The Great War is the ninth studio album by the Swedish power metal band Sabaton. It was released on 19 July 2019. It is the first studio album to feature guitarist Tommy Johansson. Like many of Sabaton's albums, it is a concept album, this time about World War I, often known as the Great War. The songs cover multiple stories from the war, including those of Manfred von Richthofen, T. E. Lawrence, Alvin York, the Attack of the Dead Men, the Battle of Verdun, and others.

The album's first single, "Fields of Verdun", was released on 3 May 2019. The next single, "The Red Baron" was released on 13 June. The title song, "Great War", was released as a single on 27 June. A music video for the track "82nd All the Way" was released on 20 July. A music video for "Seven Pillars of Wisdom", in which Indy Neidell plays the role of T. E. Lawrence, was filmed in the Tunisian desert in early September, and was released on 21 December. A live video and single for "The Attack of the Dead Men", recorded during a 13 March 2020 performance in Moscow that included Russian-language metal cover artist Radio Tapok singing the verses, were announced 8 May 2020 for a 10 July release.

The album was released in four separate editions: the standard release, a history edition with contextual narration preceding each track, a soundtrack edition featuring instrumental orchestral versions of the songs, and a Sabaton History Patreon exclusive release containing narration by Indy Neidell.

The recorded lyrics for "82nd All the Way" mistakenly attribute Sergeant Alvin York to the 338th Regiment rather than his actual assignment to the 328th Infantry Regiment. The band corrects the mistake during live performances of the song.

== Reception ==
The Great War garnered mostly positive reviews. Metal Hammer's Holly Wright gave it 4/5 stars, praising it as "a rip-roaring, riff-addled march towards victory, coaxing influences from folk and power metal that sounds remarkably upbeat for an account of bloodthirsty mass destruction." The Guardian's Dave Simpson rated the album 3/5 stars and said he preferred the History version, which precedes the songs with voiceovers describing the events the songs are about. Loudwire named it one of the 50 best metal albums of 2019.

== Cover versions ==
On 1 May 2019, Apocalyptica released their rendition of "Fields of Verdun".

On 18 July 2019, YouTube-based cover artist Radio Tapok released a Russian-language cover of "The Attack of the Dead Men" with Sabaton's assistance. Radio Tapok joined Sabaton on stage in Moscow the following spring during their Russian tour (cut short due to the COVID-19 pandemic shortly after). The performance was recorded and produced as a single for a 10 July 2020 release.

On 3 January 2020, Amaranthe released their rendition of "82nd All the Way".

== Track listing ==
No.	Title	Lyrics	Music	Theme	Length
1.	"The Future of Warfare"	Joakim Brodén	Brodén	The introduction of tanks at the Battle of Flers–Courcelette and the first tank battle at the Second Battle of Villers-Bretonneux	3:26
2.	"Seven Pillars of Wisdom"	Brodén	Chris Rörland · Brodén	T. E. Lawrence and his role in the Arab Revolt	3:02
3.	"82nd All the Way"	Brodén · Pär Sundström	Rörland · Brodén	Alvin York at the Meuse–Argonne offensive	3:31
4.	"The Attack of the Dead Men"	Brodén	Rörland · Brodén	The Attack of the Dead Men	3:56
5.	"Devil Dogs"	Sundström	Brodén	The US Marines at the Battle of Belleau Wood	3:17
6.	"The Red Baron"	Brodén	Brodén	Manfred von Richthofen, the German flying ace better known as the Red Baron	3:22
7.	"Great War"	Sundström	Brodén · Viktor Carlsson	Suffering in World War I, specifically, in the Battle of Passchendaele	4:28
8.	"A Ghost in the Trenches"	Brodén	Tommy Johansson · Brodén	Francis Pegahmagabow, one of the most decorated Canadian soldiers during World War I, specifically at the Battle of Passchendaele and the Battle of the Scarpe	3:26
9.	"Fields of Verdun"	Brodén · Sundström	Thobbe Englund · Brodén	The Battle of Verdun	3:17
10.	"The End of the War to End All Wars"	Brodén	Johansson · Brodén	The Casualties and Armistice of World War I	4:45
11.	"In Flanders Fields"	John McCrae	Brodén	A war poem by John McCrae written the day after the funeral and burial of one of his closest friends: Alexis Helmer, killed during the Second Battle of Ypres	1:57
Total length:					38:27

== Personnel ==
Band members

- Joakim Brodén – lead vocals, keyboards
- Pär Sundström – bass, backing vocals
- Chris Rörland – guitars, backing vocals
- Tommy Johansson – guitars, backing vocals
- Hannes Van Dahl – drums, backing vocals

Guest musicians

- Thobbe Englund – guitar solo on "Fields of Verdun"
- Antti Martikainen – orchestral arrangements on "Fields of Verdun", orchestral arrangements for the Soundtrack Edition
- Floor Jansen – additional vocals, vocals on Soundtrack Edition
- Bethan Dixon Bate – narration on History Edition
- Indy Neidell – narration on History Channel Edition

Production

- Jonas Kjellgren – production, engineering, mixing
- Maor Appelbaum – mastering engineer

== Charts ==
=== Weekly charts ===
Chart (2019–2020)	Peak position
Australian Albums (ARIA)	7
Austrian Albums (Ö3 Austria)	3
Belgian Albums (Ultratop Flanders)	3
Belgian Albums (Ultratop Wallonia)	19
Canadian Albums (Billboard)	24
Czech Albums (ČNS IFPI)	7
Dutch Albums (Album Top 100)	13
Finnish Albums (Suomen virallinen lista)	3
French Albums (SNEP)	40
German Albums (Offizielle Top 100)	1
Hungarian Albums (MAHASZ)	10
Italian Albums (FIMI)	50
Japanese Albums (Oricon)	74
Lithuanian Albums (AGATA)	26
Norwegian Albums (VG-lista)	4
Polish Albums (ZPAV)	3
Scottish Albums (OCC)	6
Spanish Albums (PROMUSICAE)	12
Swedish Albums (Sverigetopplistan)	1
Swiss Albums (Schweizer Hitparade)	1
UK Albums (OCC)	11
UK Independent Albums (OCC)	3
UK Rock & Metal Albums (OCC)	1
US Billboard 200	42
US Independent Albums (Billboard)	1
US Top Hard Rock Albums (Billboard)	3
US Top Rock Albums (Billboard)	5

=== Year-end charts ===
Chart (2019)	Position
Belgian Albums (Ultratop Flanders)	117
German Albums (Offizielle Top 100)	64
Swedish Albums (Sverigetopplistan)	86
Swiss Albums (Schweizer Hitparade)	76

Chart (2020)	Position
Belgian Albums (Ultratop Flanders)	188
Swedish Albums (Sverigetopplistan)	89

== Certifications ==
Region	Certification	Certified units/sales
Poland (ZPAV)	Gold	10,000^{‡}
^{‡} Sales+streaming figures based on certification alone.
