= Attero Dominatus =

2006 studio album by Sabaton

Studio album by Sabaton
- Released: 28 July 2006 (original); 24 September 2010 (Re-Armed edition)
- Recorded: March–May 2006
- Studios: The Abyss (Pärlby, Sweden)
- Genre: Power metal
- Length: 40:57
- Labels: Black Lodge (original); Nuclear Blast (Re-Armed edition)
- Producer: Tommy Tägtgren

Sabaton chronology
Primo Victoria (2005)	Attero Dominatus (2006)	Metalizer (2007)

Professional ratings
Review scores
Source	Rating
Cosmos Gaming	Positive
Scream Magazine	5/6

Attero Dominatus is the second studio album by the Swedish power metal band Sabaton, as well as the first to feature keyboardist Daniel Mÿhr. The album reached 16th place on the Swedish album charts, remaining in the listings for seven weeks.

A video for the title track was shot in Umeå, Sweden, by Nocturnal Rites' drummer Owe Lingvall. For the recording, the band wore camouflage gear, and singer Joakim Brodén donned a vest with metal plates, both features which came to be part of the band's regular stage gear from that point on.

In 2010, the album was re-released on German label Nuclear Blast with five bonus tracks, under the title Attero Dominatus Re-Armed.

== Lyrics ==
As with the Primo Victoria album, the lyrics on Attero Dominatus deals with different war subjects. "Nuclear Attack" deals with the atomic bombings of Hiroshima and Nagasaki, "Rise of Evil" with the rise of the Third Reich and Adolf Hitler. "We Burn" deals with the Bosnian genocide from the perspective of Radovan Karadžić and other perpetrators of the massacre. The song "Back in Control" deals with the Falklands War. "In the Name of God" is about terrorism, especially religious terrorism.

== Track listing ==
No.	Title	Lyrics	Music	Theme	Length
1.	"Attero Dominatus"	Brodén, Sundström	Brodén	The Battle of Berlin from the Soviet perspective	3:43
2.	"Nuclear Attack"	Brodén	Brodén	The atomic bombings of Hiroshima and Nagasaki	4:09
3.	"Rise of Evil"	Brodén	Brodén	The creation of the Third Reich and the start of World War II from the Nazis' perspective	8:19
4.	"In the Name of God"	Brodén	Brodén	Religious terrorism from the perspective of those opposed to their actions	4:06
5.	"We Burn"	Sundström	Brodén	The Srebrenica massacre from Radovan Karadžić's perspective	2:55
6.	"Angels Calling"	Brodén	Brodén	Trench warfare during World War One	5:57
7.	"Back in Control"	Brodén, Sundström	Brodén	The Falklands War from the British perspective	3:14
8.	"Light in the Black"	Brodén, Sundström	Brodén	Peacekeeping forces	4:52
9.	"Metal Crüe"	Brodén	Brodén	A tribute to Metal and Rock using band names to make the lyrics	3:42
Total length:					40:57

Re-armed edition bonus tracks
No.	Title	Length
10.	"Für immer" (Warlock cover)	4:36
11.	"Långa bollar på Bengt" (Svenne Rubins cover)	2:52
12.	"Metal Medley (Live in Falun)" (actually a live version of the song "Metal Machine" from the album Primo Victoria)	6:12
13.	"Nightchild"	5:12
14.	"Primo Victoria (Demo Version)"	4:11
Total length:		23:03

== Personnel ==
- Joakim Brodén – vocals
- Rickard Sundén – guitars
- Oskar Montelius – guitars
- Pär Sundström – bass
- Daniel Mullback – drums
- Daniel Mÿhr – keyboards
- Christian Eriksson – backing vocals and screams on "Metal Crüe"

== Charts ==
Chart (2006)	Peak position
Swedish Albums (Sverigetopplistan)	16

== Release history ==
Country	Date
Europe	2007
United States	29 January 2008
