= The War to End All Wars (album) =

2022 studio album by Sabaton

Studio album by Sabaton
- Released: 4 March 2022
- Recorded: 2021
- Genre: Power metal
- Length: 45:21
- Label: Nuclear Blast

Sabaton chronology
The Great War (2019)	The War to End All Wars (2022)	Legends (2025)

Singles from The War to End All Wars
- 1. "Christmas Truce" Released: 29 October 2021; 2. "Soldier of Heaven" Released: 7 January 2022; 3. "The Unkillable Soldier" Released: 11 February 2022; 4. "Race to the Sea" Released: 4 March 2022; 5. "Stormtroopers" Released: 16 December 2022

The War to End All Wars is the tenth studio album by the Swedish power metal band Sabaton, released on 4 March 2022. It is the last album to feature guitarist Tommy Johansson and their last to be released through Nuclear Blast.

The album serves as a sequel to the band's 2019 album The Great War, and is a concept album which, like its predecessor, focuses on the atrocities, miracles and happenings around World War I, such as those of the Christmas truce, the stormtroopers of the German Army, the Race to the Sea, the Treaty of Versailles, the predominant dreadnought type of battleship during the early 20th century, and others. A "History Edition" of the album was released, featuring spoken introductions by Bethan Dixon Bate, who also narrated the main verses in the songs, "Sarajevo" and "Versailles". Bate had previously narrated the introductions for the "History Edition" of The Great War album. "The Symphony to End All Wars" was also released, featuring orchestral arrangements of the songs. Among the musicians featured were cellist Tina Guo, and Floor Jansen, who provided vocals on the album's version of "Christmas Truce".

The single "Christmas Truce" was nominated for Music Video of the Year at the 2021 Global Metal Apocalypse Awards, finishing second overall.

== Reception ==
In the U.S., the album sold 8,000 copies in its first week of release.

== Accolades ==
Publication	List	Rank
Metal Hammer	The Best Metal Albums of 2022 So Far	–

== Track listing ==
The War to End All Wars track listing
No.	Title	Lyrics	Music	Theme	Length
1.	"Sarajevo"	Pär Sundström · Joakim Brodén	Chris Rörland · Brodén	The assassination of Archduke Franz Ferdinand	4:37
2.	"Stormtroopers"	Brodén	Brodén	The stormtroopers, specialist soldiers of Imperial Germany	3:56
3.	"Dreadnought"	Sundström · Brodén	Brodén	Dreadnought-type battleships and the Battle of Jutland	4:58
4.	"The Unkillable Soldier"	Sundström · Brodén	Brodén	Adrian Carton de Wiart during World War I	4:11
5.	"Soldier of Heaven"	Sundström	Rörland · Brodén	The Italian-Austrian front and White Friday	3:38
6.	"Hellfighters"	Brodén	Rörland · Brodén	The 369th Infantry Regiment of the United States of America, also known as the Harlem Hellfighters	3:26
7.	"Race to the Sea"	Brodén	Brodén	Albert I of Belgium fighting alongside Belgian soldiers in the Battle of the Yser at the end of the 1914 Race to the Sea	3:47
8.	"Lady of the Dark"	Sundström	Brodén	Milunka Savić, a female Serbian soldier from 1912-1919	3:03
9.	"The Valley of Death"	Sundström · Brodén	Rörland · Brodén	The three battles of Doiran (1916, 1917, 1918)	4:13
10.	"Christmas Truce"	Sundström · Brodén	Brodén	The Christmas Truce of 1914	5:18
11.	"Versailles"	Sundström · Brodén	Rörland · Brodén	The Treaty of Versailles	4:14
Total length:					45:21

=== Notes ===
- The song "Sarajevo" does not appear on the standard digital version of the album, although it does appear on the digital "History Edition" and all CD and vinyl versions.

== Personnel ==
Band members

- Joakim Brodén – lead vocals, keyboards
- Pär Sundström – bass, backing vocals
- Chris Rörland – guitars, backing vocals
- Tommy Johansson – guitars, backing vocals
- Hannes Van Dahl – drums, backing vocals

Guest musicians

- Bethan Dixon Bate – narration on "Sarajevo", "Versailles" and History Edition album
- Flowing Chords – backing vocals on "Christmas Truce"
- Antti Martikainen - arranger on The Symphony to End All Wars album
- Floor Jansen - vocals on The Symphony to End All Wars album ("Christmas Truce")
- Tina Guo - cello on The Symphony to End All Wars album

== Charts ==
=== Weekly charts ===
Weekly chart performance for The War to End All Wars
Chart (2022)	Peak position
Australian Albums (ARIA)	25
Austrian Albums (Ö3 Austria)	1
Belgian Albums (Ultratop Flanders)	4
Belgian Albums (Ultratop Wallonia)	26
Canadian Albums (Billboard)	90
Czech Albums (ČNS IFPI)	6
Dutch Albums (Album Top 100)	6
Finnish Albums (Suomen virallinen lista)	1
French Albums (SNEP)	47
German Albums (Offizielle Top 100)	1
Hungarian Albums (MAHASZ)	1
Italian Albums (FIMI)	71
Japanese Albums (Oricon)	87
Japanese Hot Albums (Billboard Japan)	89
Norwegian Albums (VG-lista)	2
Polish Albums (ZPAV)	1
Scottish Albums (OCC)	6
Spanish Albums (PROMUSICAE)	28
Swedish Albums (Sverigetopplistan)	1
Swiss Albums (Schweizer Hitparade)	4
UK Albums (OCC)	16
UK Independent Albums (OCC)	3
UK Rock & Metal Albums (OCC)	2
US Billboard 200	87
US Independent Albums (Billboard)	12
US Top Hard Rock Albums (Billboard)	2
US Top Rock Albums (Billboard)	9

=== Year-end charts ===
Year-end chart performance for The War to End All Wars
Chart (2022)	Position
Belgian Albums (Ultratop Flanders)	145
German Albums (Offizielle Top 100)	43
Hungarian Albums (MAHASZ)	6
Polish Albums (ZPAV)	100
Swedish Albums (Sverigetopplistan)	40
Swiss Albums (Schweizer Hitparade)	89

== Certifications ==
Certifications for The War to End All Wars
Region	Certification	Certified units/sales
Hungary (MAHASZ)	Gold	2,000^{‡}
Sweden (GLF)	Gold	15,000^{‡}
^{‡} Sales+streaming figures based on certification alone.
