= Coat of Arms (Sabaton album) =

2010 studio album by Sabaton

Studio album by Sabaton
- Released: 21 May 2010
- Recorded: December 2009 – February 2010
- Studio: The Abyss (Pärlby, Sweden)
- Genre: Power metal
- Length: 39:47
- Label: Nuclear Blast
- Producer: Peter Tägtgren

Sabaton chronology
The Art of War (2008)	Coat of Arms (2010)	Carolus Rex (2012)

Singles from Coat of Arms
- 1. "Coat of Arms" Released: 17 May 2010; 2. "Screaming Eagles" Released: 23 October 2010

Coat of Arms is the fifth studio album by the Swedish power metal band Sabaton.

== Track listing ==
All music by Joakim Brodén and all lyrics by Brodén and Pär Sundström (except lyrics on "Saboteurs" and "Midway" by Sundström only and lyrics on "Metal Ripper" and "Wehrmacht" by Brodén only).

No.	Title	Theme	Length
1.	"Coat of Arms"	The Greco-Italian War during WWII from the Greeks' perspective	3:35
2.	"Midway"	The Battle of Midway	2:29
3.	"Uprising"	The Warsaw Uprising	4:55
4.	"Screaming Eagles"	The 101st Airborne Division and the Siege of Bastogne	4:06
5.	"The Final Solution"	The Holocaust	4:56
6.	"Aces in Exile"	Foreign pilots during the Battle of Britain	4:22
7.	"Saboteurs"	The Norwegian heavy water sabotage at Vemork	3:15
8.	"Wehrmacht"	The Nazi war machine and the effects of the Third Reich on an ordinary German soldier	4:14
9.	"White Death"	Simo Häyhä, an extremely skilled Finnish sniper during the Winter War	4:10
10.	"Metal Ripper"	A tribute to heavy metal as in the songs "Metal Machine" and "Metal Crüe" from previous albums, this time using lyrics and guitar riffs from heavy metal songs. It includes lyrical tributes to bands such as: AC/DC, Mötley Crüe, Iron Maiden, Metallica, Manowar, Twisted Sister, Ozzy Osbourne, Judas Priest, Black Sabbath, Rainbow, HammerFall, Dokken, Krokus, Yngwie Malmsteen, Accept, Deep Purple, Queensrÿche, Dimmu Borgir, Queen and Heaven's Gate	3:51

Digipak edition bonus tracks

1. "Coat of Arms (Instrumental)" (3:35)
2. "Metal Ripper (instrumental)" (3:51)

Streaming and digital download bonus track

1. "White Death (Instrumental)" (4:10)

Professional ratings
Review scores
Source	Rating
Lords of Metal	(86/100)
Danger Dog	4/5 stars
Allmusic	4/5 stars

== Personnel ==
- Joakim Brodén – vocals
- Rickard Sundén – guitars
- Oskar Montelius – guitars
- Pär Sundström – bass
- Daniel Mullback – drums
- Daniel Mÿhr – keyboards

== Charts ==
Chart (2010)	Peak position
Austrian Albums (Ö3 Austria)	71
Finnish Albums (Suomen virallinen lista)	17
German Albums (Offizielle Top 100)	19
Greek Albums (IFPI)	10
Hungarian Albums (MAHASZ)	9
Polish Albums (ZPAV)	9
Swedish Albums (Sverigetopplistan)	2
Swiss Albums (Schweizer Hitparade)	33
UK Independent Albums (OCC)	39

== Certifications ==
Region	Certification	Certified units/sales
Poland (ZPAV)	Gold	10,000^{*}
^{*} Sales figures based on certification alone.

== Notes ==
- Because the official translation of "40:1" song from the former album was criticised by Polish fans, a contest was set for the best translation of the "Uprising" lyrics to Polish. The winning translation was chosen as the official.
- The riff in "White Death" has been borrowed from Ankie Bagger's "Where Were You Last Night".
- The video for "Uprising" was a re-enactment of Polish resistance during World War II and contained the actor Peter Stormare as well as Polish actors Monika Buchowiec and Mateusz Damięcki.
