= Heroes (Sabaton album) =

2014 studio album by Sabaton

Studio album by Sabaton
- Released: 6 May 2014
- Recorded: January–February 2014
- Studio: The Abyss (Pärlby, Sweden)
- Genre: Power metal
- Length: CD 36:57; Digipak 44:18; Earbook 50:21
- Label: Nuclear Blast
- Producer: Peter Tägtgren

Sabaton chronology
Carolus Rex (2012)	Heroes (2014)	The Last Stand (2016)

Singles from Heroes
- 1. "To Hell and Back" Released: 28 March 2014; 2. "Resist and Bite" Released: 2 May 2014; 3. "Night Witches" Released: 15 October 2014

Limited and Earbook edition cover

Professional ratings
Review scores
Source	Rating
About.com	4/5 stars
Ultimate Guitar	7.2/10

Heroes is the seventh studio album by the Swedish power metal band Sabaton, released on 6 May 2014. It is the first album to feature the new Sabaton line-up with guitarists Chris Rörland and Thobbe Englund, as well as new drummer Hannes van Dahl. It was produced by Peter Tägtgren at Abyss Studios. The artwork was created by Péter Sallai and the photos by Ryan Garrison. The first single, "To Hell and Back", was released digitally on 14 March 2014 and available on iTunes, Nuclear Blast, Amazon and Google Play. The second single, "Resist and Bite", was also released digitally on 2 May 2014, available on iTunes, Nuclear Blast and Amazon.

Pär Sundström said about the album's concept: "Well, I think this is a perfect concept for Sabaton. We decided to go for the idea to write about individuals instead of bigger battles. Individuals who we think basically went beyond their call of duty, put themselves into harm's way for the good of others".

In an interview to the Brazilian Army's official blog, Sundström explained that the idea for the track "Smoking Snakes" came when he was doing some research for the album: "I tried searching for the word 'Helden', which means heroes in German. I then came across the story of the Drei Brasilianischen Helden (Three Brazilian Heroes) and, from that point on, we deepened our research and decided to write the track."

== Track listing ==
All lyrics by Joakim Brodén and Pär Sundström. All music by Brodén, except "Inmate 4859" by Brodén & Peter Tägtgren, and "Soldier of 3 Armies" by Brodén and Thobbe Englund.

No.	Title	Theme	Length
1.	"Night Witches"	The all-female Soviet 588th Night Bomber Regiment called "Night Witches".	3:01
2.	"No Bullets Fly"	The Charlie Brown and Franz Stigler incident in December 1943, in which German pilot Stigler accompanied a disabled American bomber back to the English Channel.	3:37
3.	"Smoking Snakes"	Arlindo Lúcio da Silva, Geraldo Baeta da Cruz and Geraldo Rodrigues de Souza – three Brazilian Expeditionary Force soldiers, who became separated from their unit and fought a large contingent of Germans in Italy on 14 April 1945. Refusing surrender, they fought to their deaths and were buried by the Germans, who placed a cross over their graves with the inscription "Drei brasilianische Helden" (Three Brazilian Heroes).	3:14
4.	"Inmate 4859"	Witold Pilecki, soldier of the Polish Home Army and leader of resistance movement in the Birkenau Auschwitz concentration camp, where he was interned voluntarily as inmate number 4859. He also produced the Witold's Report.	4:26
5.	"To Hell and Back"	Audie Murphy, one of the most decorated American veterans of World War II, specifically his post-war battle with PTSD. Based on his own poem, "The Crosses Grow on Anzio", from his book To Hell and Back.	3:26
6.	"The Ballad of Bull"	Corporal Leslie "Bull" Allen, an Australian Army soldier awarded the US Silver Star for rescuing 12 wounded American soldiers during the Papua New Guinea campaign of World War II.	3:53
7.	"Resist and Bite"	Chasseurs Ardennais, an infantry formation of the Belgian Armed Forces that fought in the Battle of Belgium in World War II.	3:27
8.	"Soldier of 3 Armies"	Lauri Törni, known also as Larry Thorne, a soldier of the Finnish Army, the German Waffen-SS, and the United States Army Green Berets in Vietnam.	3:38
9.	"Far from the Fame"	Hero of Czechoslovakia, Air Marshal Karel Janoušek, founder of Czechoslovak forces in the Royal Air Force, and later imprisoned by the country's communist regime.	3:47
10.	"Hearts of Iron"	The German forces of the 12th and 9th Armies who, facing defeat at the hands of the Soviets, created a corridor across the Elbe to protect fleeing refugees and soldiers to escape and surrender to the West.	4:28
Total length:			36:57

No.	Title	Theme	Length
11.	"7734"	A re-recording of a song originally released on the band's 2007 album Metalizer. The title is a calculator spelling of "Hell", and the song's lyrics reference both soldiers in general and religion.	3:33
12.	"Man of War"	A homage to and featuring references of various songs by the classic metal band Manowar.	3:48
Total length:			44:18

- These last two tracks are listed on every other released version of this album.

No.	Title	Length
13.	"For Whom the Bell Tolls" (Metallica cover)	5:22
14.	"En hjältes väg" (Raubtier cover)	4:26
15.	"Out of Control" (Battle Beast cover)	3:36
Total length:		57:42

- These last three songs are only featured on the earbook edition, although track 13 is available on Spotify.

== Music video ==
The song "To Hell and Back" was also made into a music video which was directed by Owe Lingvall and produced by Bengt Larvia. It was uploaded on Nuclear Blast Records main YouTube channel on 15 May, and currently has over 6 million views as of June 2025.

== Personnel ==
- Joakim Brodén – lead vocals, keyboards
- Pär Sundström – bass, backing vocals
- Chris Rörland – guitars, backing vocals
- Thobbe Englund – guitars, backing vocals
- Hannes van Dahl – drums, backing vocals

== Release information ==
- The special limited earbook edition (28x28cm) is housed in a faux leather sleeve including a metal emblem, a signing card and a five-track bonus CD (only through mailorder).
- Limited 500 blue yellow splatter vinyls edition.
- Black vinyl edition with six songs on the A-side and six on the B-side of which the last two are bonus tracks: "7734" and "Man of War".
- Limited Digi book edition.
- Limited 300 green vinyls edition. The green vinyl edition also comes in a DLP (double LP) format.
- Limited edition Clear Numbered Vinyl, LP, Album 100 hand numbered copies with gatefold cover.

== Charts ==
=== Weekly charts ===
Chart (2014–2015)	Peak position
Austrian Albums (Ö3 Austria)	11
Belgian Albums (Ultratop Flanders)	28
Belgian Albums (Ultratop Wallonia)	72
Danish Albums (Hitlisten)	20
Dutch Albums (Album Top 100)	37
Finnish Albums (Suomen virallinen lista)	2
French Albums (SNEP)	156
German Albums (Offizielle Top 100)	3
Hungarian Albums (MAHASZ)	20
Norwegian Albums (VG-lista)	13
Polish Albums (ZPAV)	5
Scottish Albums (OCC)	40
Swedish Albums (Sverigetopplistan)	1
Swiss Albums (Schweizer Hitparade)	7
UK Albums (OCC)	59
UK Independent Albums (OCC)	7
UK Rock & Metal Albums (OCC)	3
US Billboard 200	99
US Independent Albums (Billboard)	13
US Top Hard Rock Albums (Billboard)	5
US Top Rock Albums (Billboard)	29

=== Year-end charts ===
Chart (2014)	Position
Swedish Albums (Sverigetopplistan)	15

Chart (2015)	Position
Swedish Albums (Sverigetopplistan)	59

== Certifications ==
Region	Certification	Certified units/sales
Germany (BVMI)	Gold	100,000^{‡}
Sweden (GLF)	Platinum	40,000^{‡}
United Kingdom (BPI)	Silver	60,000^{‡}
^{‡} Sales+streaming figures based on certification alone.
