= Patremoir =

Literary genre focused on fathers

This is a portmanteau word which combines "pater" and "memoir" to describe personal poems, essays, graphic narratives, books and films about the father. Coined by Andre Gerard, and first used in the introduction to Fathers: A Literary Anthology, the word calls attention to the rapidly growing body of personal, often critical, responses to fathers. Some scholars have started to use a competing neologism, “patriography,” to describe such material, but patremoir has the advantage of being both more precise and more inclusive, as well as being easier to pronounce.
