= Fathers (book) =

2011 essay collection

- First edition cover
- Editor: Andre Gerard
- Publisher: Patremoir Press
- Publication date: 2011
- ISBN: 978-0-986-55540-4

Fathers: A Literary Anthology is a collection of 49 personal essays and poems about fathers by eminent American, British and Canadian writers. Contributors include Margaret Atwood, Angela Carter, Bruce Chatwin, Winston Churchill, Seamus Heaney, Doris Lessing and Philip Roth. The anthology was published in Vancouver by Patremoir Press in 2011. In the introduction to the book, the editor, Andre Gerard, suggests that personal writing about fathers is a relatively new phenomenon, one for which he proposes the name of patremoir, and he traces the origins of this kind of writing back to Edmund Gosse's Father and Son. According to Gerard, Gosse helped make it possible to speak intimately and openly about the father.

Fathers is more than just a compilation of exceptional essays and poems. As the anthology unfolds, Gerard uses his introductions and his author biographies to create a meta-narrative. He foregrounds the relationship between anthologist and reader, and he uses the essays and poems to call attention to how we shape the world and ourselves through the stories we tell. He gradually becomes a character in his own anthology, a Telemachus figure searching through father stories and eventually telling a father story of his own.

== Quotations ==
“If the father can be reconstituted, if the father can outlive his dying, perhaps immortality of meaning can be conferred upon our own lives.”

“The temporal variations in father-child interactions create a distortion, a haze, through which fathers can only be guessed at.”

“Our fathers are what we make of them, and what we make of them depends on who we are; to push the tautology even further, who we are often depends on what we’ve made of our father.”
