= Metalizer =

2007 studio album by Sabaton

Studio album by Sabaton
- Released: 16 March 2007
- Recorded: 2002, with minor remastering in January 2007
- Genre: Power metal
- Length: 43:18
- Label: Black Lodge Records (original); Nuclear Blast (Re-Armed edition)

Sabaton chronology
Attero Dominatus (2006)	Metalizer (2007)	The Art of War (2008)

Singles from Metalizer
- 1. "Masters of the World" Released: Early 2007

Metalizer is the third full-length release by the Swedish power metal band Sabaton, but was actually recorded as their professional debut album (second overall) in 2002. The band's first record company, Underground Symphony, withheld the recordings for several years before arranging to release the rights to the band's new label Black Lodge Records.

The band's first album, the demo compilation Fist for Fight, is included as a bonus disc with a previously unreleased track. Most of the tracks on the first disc are re-recordings from this release.

Metalizer reached 21st place in the Swedish album charts. In 2010, the album was re-released on German label Nuclear Blast with four bonus tracks, under the name Metalizer Re-Armed.

== Track listing ==
Disc 1
No.	Title	Theme	Length
1.	"Hellrider"	About the Ghost Rider	3:42
2.	"Thundergods"		3:47
3.	"Metalizer"		4:06
4.	"Shadows"	About the Nazgûl from The Lord of the Rings	3:28
5.	"Burn Your Crosses"	From the perspective of a victim of the Spanish Inquisition	5:09
6.	"7734"		3:41
7.	"Endless Nights"		4:52
8.	"Hail to the King"		3:39
9.	"Thunderstorm"		3:08
10.	"Speeder"		3:45
11.	"Masters of the World"		4:01

2010 Re-Armed edition bonus tracks
No.	Title	Length
12.	"Jawbreaker" (Judas Priest cover, also in the special edition)	3:23
13.	"Dream Destroyer"	3:12
14.	"Panzer Battalion" (Demo Version)	5:01
15.	"Hellrider" (Live in Västerås 2006)	4:25

Disc 2: Fist for Fight
No.	Title	Length
1.	"Introduction"	0:50
2.	"Hellrider"	3:48
3.	"Endless Nights"	4:49
4.	"Metalizer"	4:25
5.	"Burn Your Crosses"	5:23
6.	"The Hammer Has Fallen"	5:50
7.	"Hail to the King"	4:08
8.	"Shadows"	3:33
9.	"Thunderstorm"	3:10
10.	"Masters of the World"	4:00
11.	"Guten Nacht"	1:53
12.	"Birds of War" (previously unreleased)	4:52

== Note ==
- Disk 2 is the compilation of the two demos of Sabaton. It was originally released as a test of the market in 2000. 600 copies were pressed and they sold out within weeks. In 2001, the compilation was re-released in a digipak edition by Underground Symphony. It was limited to 3000 copies.

== Personnel ==
Sabaton

- Joakim Brodén – vocals, keyboards
- Rickard Sundén – guitars
- Oskar Montelius – guitars
- Pär Sundström – bass
- Daniel Mullback – drums
- Richard Larsson - drums (disc 2)

Production Staff (Disk 1)

- Henke - mastering
- Mats Brännlund - recording, mixing
- Tommy Tägtgren - recording, mixing
- Mattias Norén - cover art

Production Staff (Disk 2)

- Mats Brännlund - recording, mixing
- Tommy Tägtgren - recording, mastering
- Ken Kelly - cover art

== Charts ==
Chart (2007)	Peak position
Swedish Albums (Sverigetopplistan)	21
