= Sabaton (band) =

Swedish power metal band

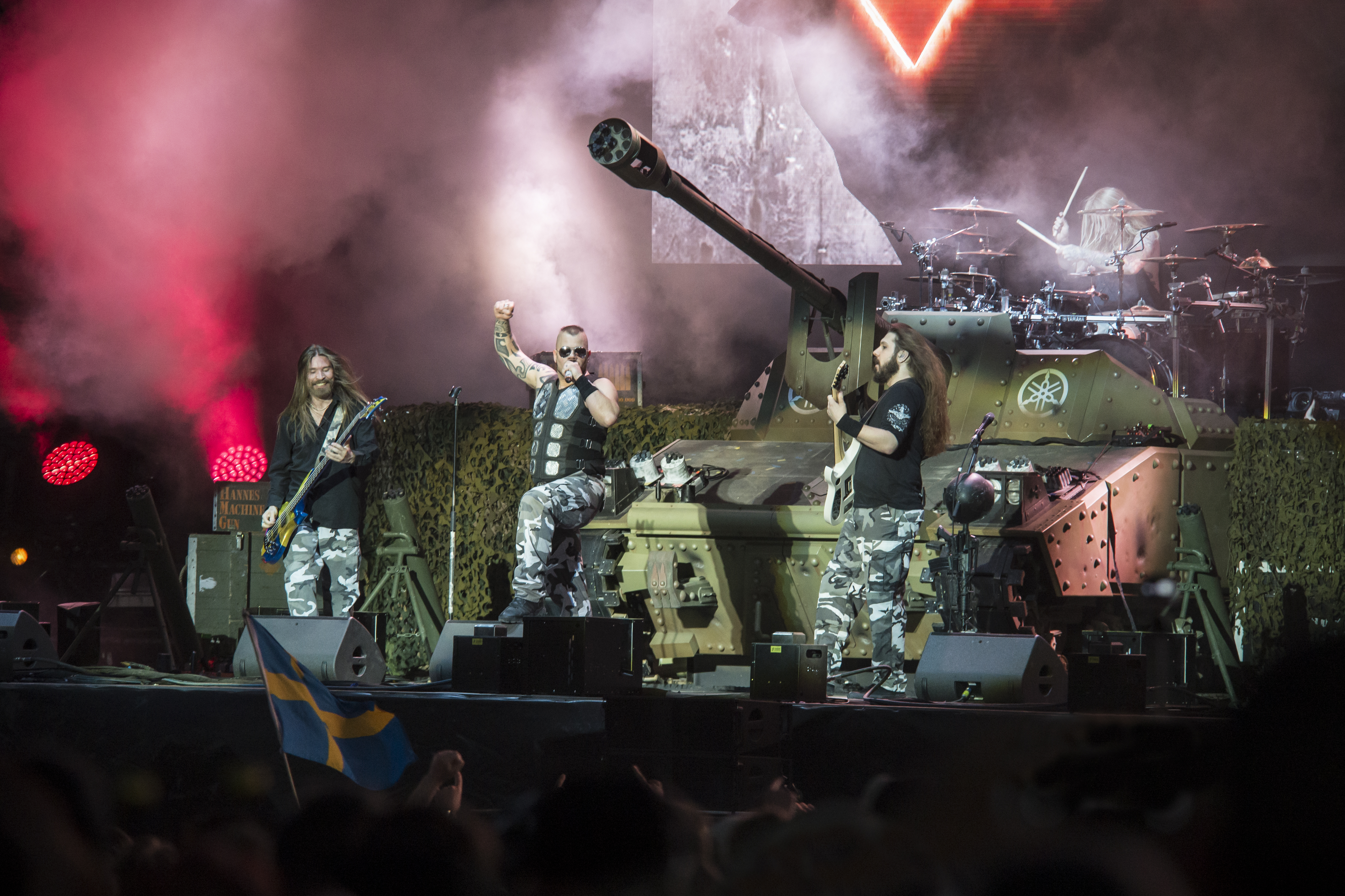
- Sabaton at Hellfest 2017

Background information
- Origin: Falun, Sweden
- Genre: Power metal
- Years active: 1999–present
- Labels: Underground Symphony; Black Lodge; Nuclear Blast; Better Noise Music
- Spinoffs: Civil War
- Members: Joakim Brodén; Pär Sundström; Chris Rörland; Hannes Van Dahl; Thobbe Englund
- Past members: Oskar Montelius; Rikard Sundén; Richard Larsson; Daniel Mullback; Daniel Mÿhr; Robban Bäck; Tommy Johansson
- Website: sabaton.net
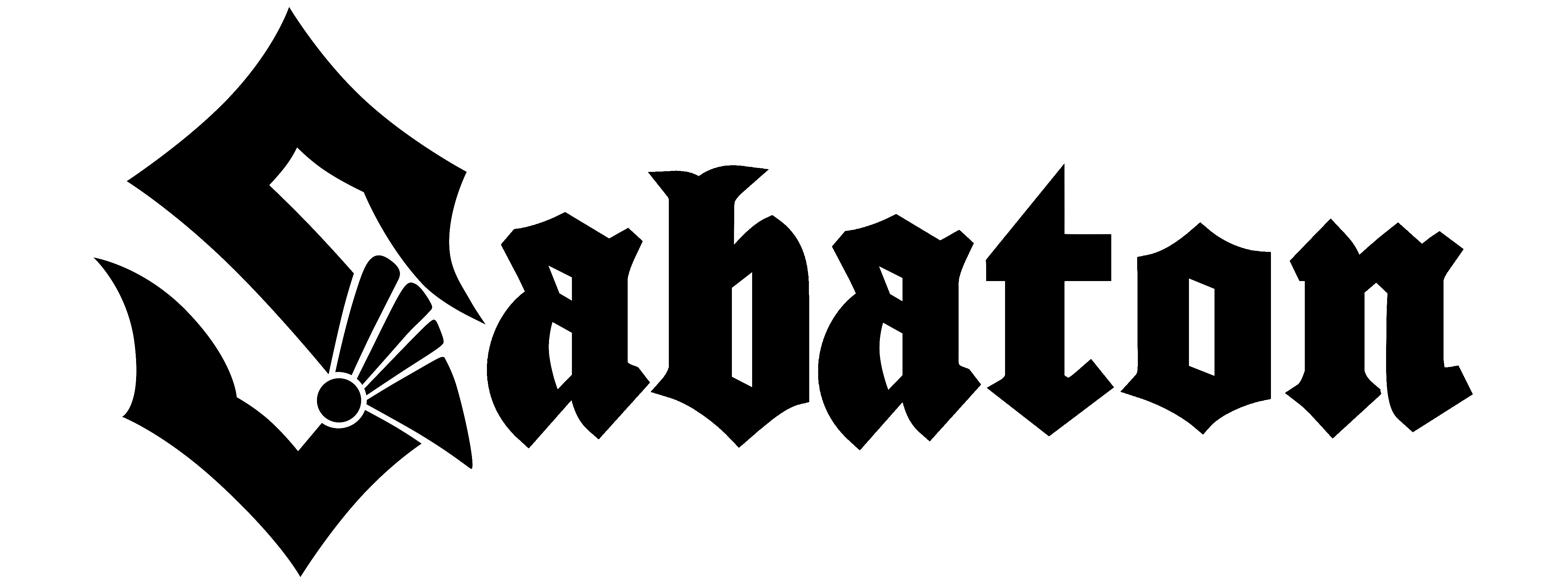

Sabaton is a Swedish power metal band from Falun, formed in 1999 by lead singer Joakim Brodén, bassist Pär Sundström, guitarists Oskar Montelius and Rikard Sundén, and drummer Richard Larsson. The band has gone through multiple lineup changes with Brodén and Sundström remaining the only consistent members. The vast majority of their songs are about historical events, mainly wars and significant battles. As of 2026, the band has released eleven studio albums, four live albums, five live DVDs and thirty music videos.

== History ==
=== Formation and first albums (1999–2009) ===
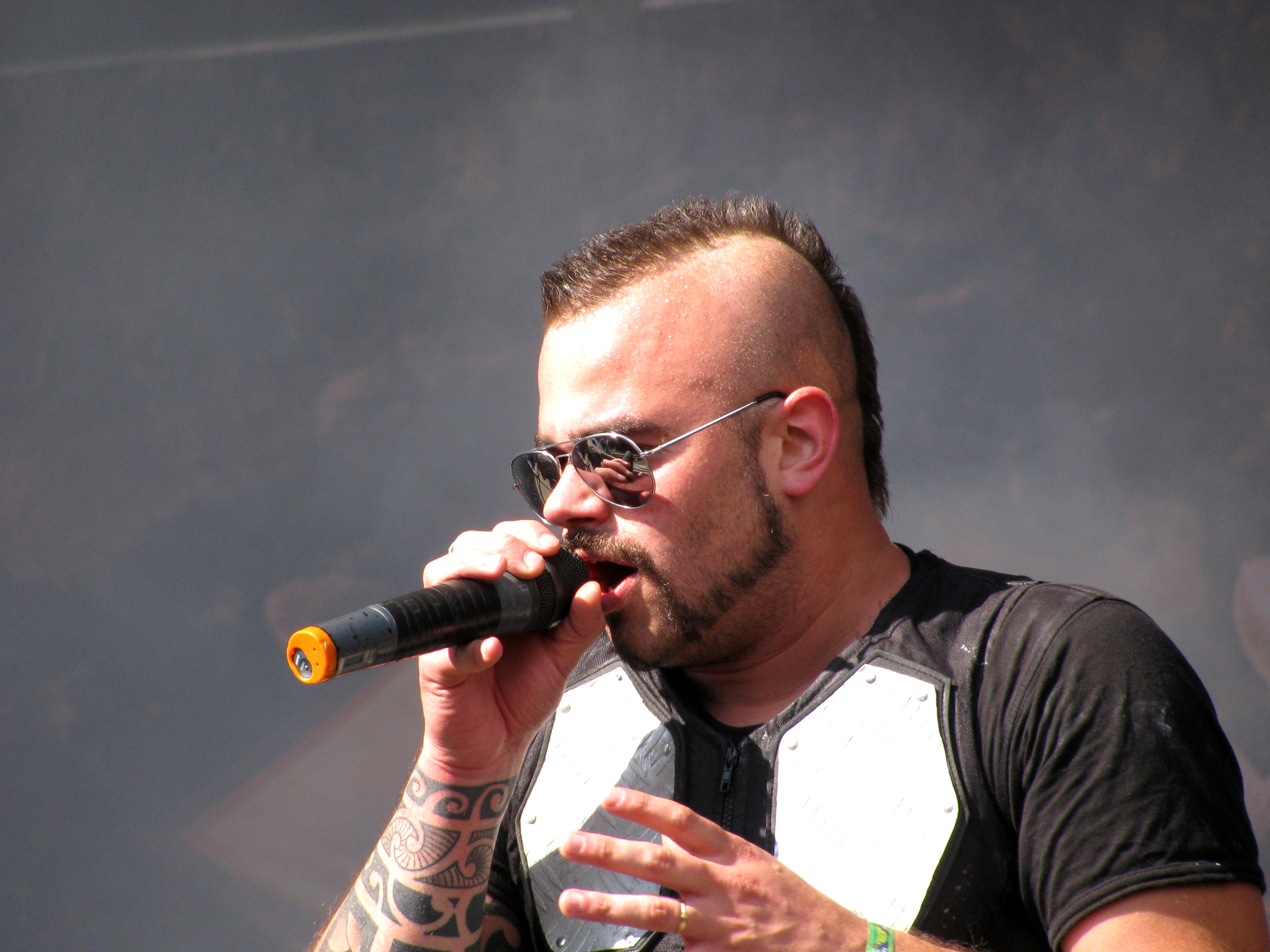
Joakim Brodén, the vocalist of Sabaton

Sabaton was formed in December 1999. After the first songs were recorded in Peter Tägtgren's studio, The Abyss, Sabaton was contacted by a couple of record labels. The band signed with the Italian label Underground Symphony, which then released, internationally, the promo CD Fist for Fight. The disc, distilled from two demo tapes recorded between 1999 and 2000, was intended to promote forthcoming Sabaton releases. In 2002, a new album, Metalizer, was recorded and was supposed to be distributed by Underground Symphony as the band's debut album. After two years of waiting, during which the band held various performances across Sweden, the album was abandoned.

Sabaton signed a new deal with Black Lodge, the metal division of the Sound Pollution record label, and released their second album, titled Primo Victoria, in 2005. Vocalist Joakim Brodén stated that the album's title track "kicked off" the band's historical theme. Bass player Pär Sundström stated that the band decided to focus primarily on historical themes in their lyrics after he and Brodén watched the film Saving Private Ryan. In early 2005, keyboardist Daniel Mÿhr was recruited in order to relieve Brodén of his keyboard duties. In early 2006, Sabaton toured in support of Edguy and DragonForce. The band's third album, Attero Dominatus, was released in Europe on 28 July 2006. In March 2007, Sabaton released Metalizer as a double disc together with Fist for Fight, along with the previously unreleased song "Birds of War".

As a follow-up to Metalizer, in May 2008, Sabaton released its fourth album, The Art of War, an album inspired by the influential book by Sun Tzu. The decision to base the album upon Sun Tzu's book came from the idea that in the 2000 years since the book was written, the human race has achieved many things, but, apart from weapon advancements, operational art, and strategy, war itself has remained basically the same. The album contains the singles "Cliffs of Gallipoli" and "Ghost Division". They toured Europe in 2009 as an opening act on the HammerFall Tour. After their Bloodstock performance, the band again went on tour with DragonForce, towards the end of 2009, for eighteen shows in the UK.

=== Coat of Arms (2010–2011) ===
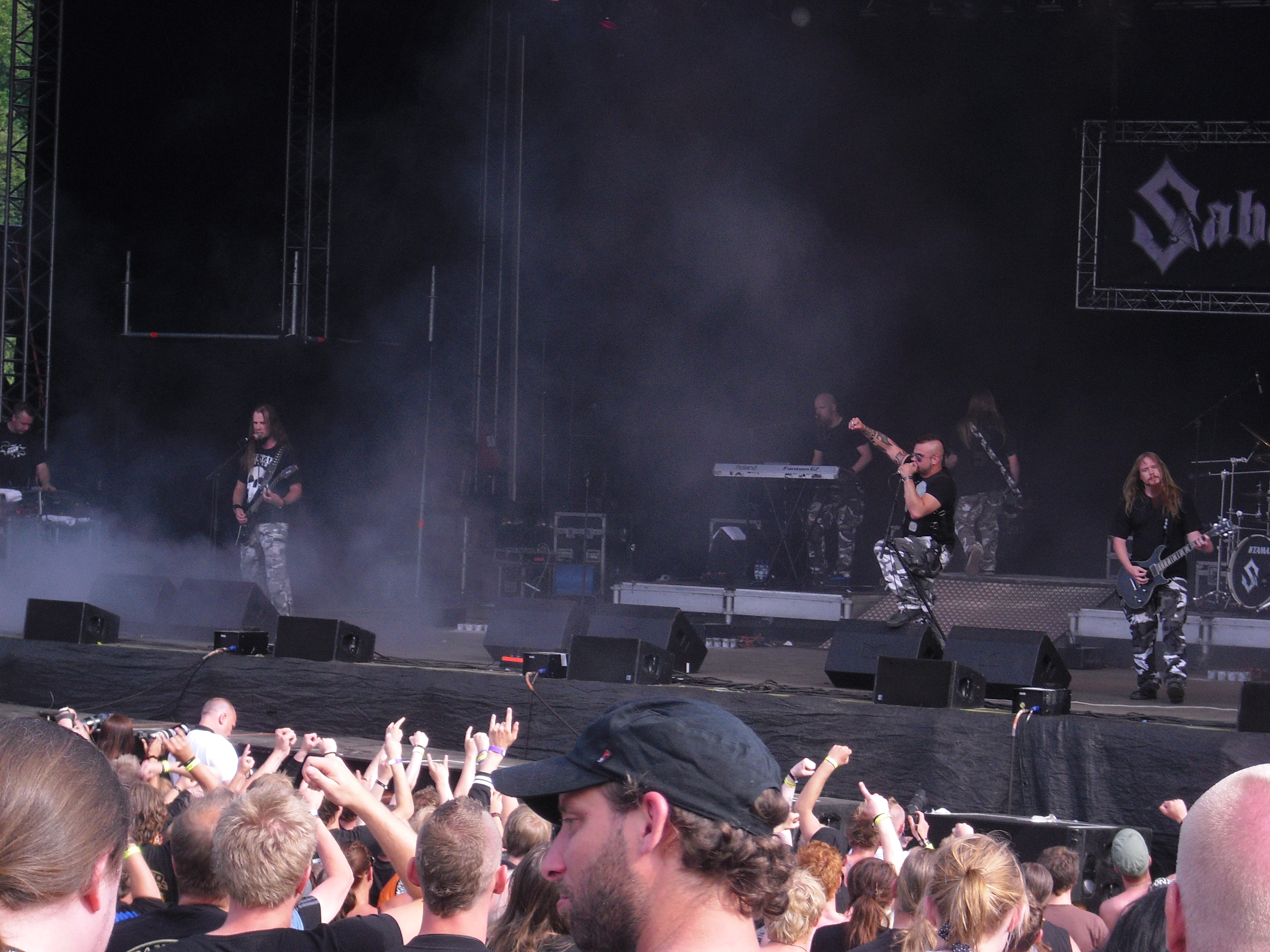
Sabaton performing at Norway Rock Festival in 2010

The band had hoped to begin recording the next album in October, but with concerts booked and the DragonForce support tour the following month, it was pushed back. On 23 December 2009, the band announced the name of their forthcoming album. Coat of Arms contains a majority of songs about World War II including the Winter War. They announced it on their official website, and posted a link to a YouTube video containing the album art and a teaser music sample. Coat of Arms was released on 21 May 2010. The first music video, for "Uprising", was released on 1 August 2010 and features Peter Stormare. This was accompanied by a European tour. A second music video, for "Screaming Eagles", was released on 25 May.

=== Lineup change (2012–2015) ===
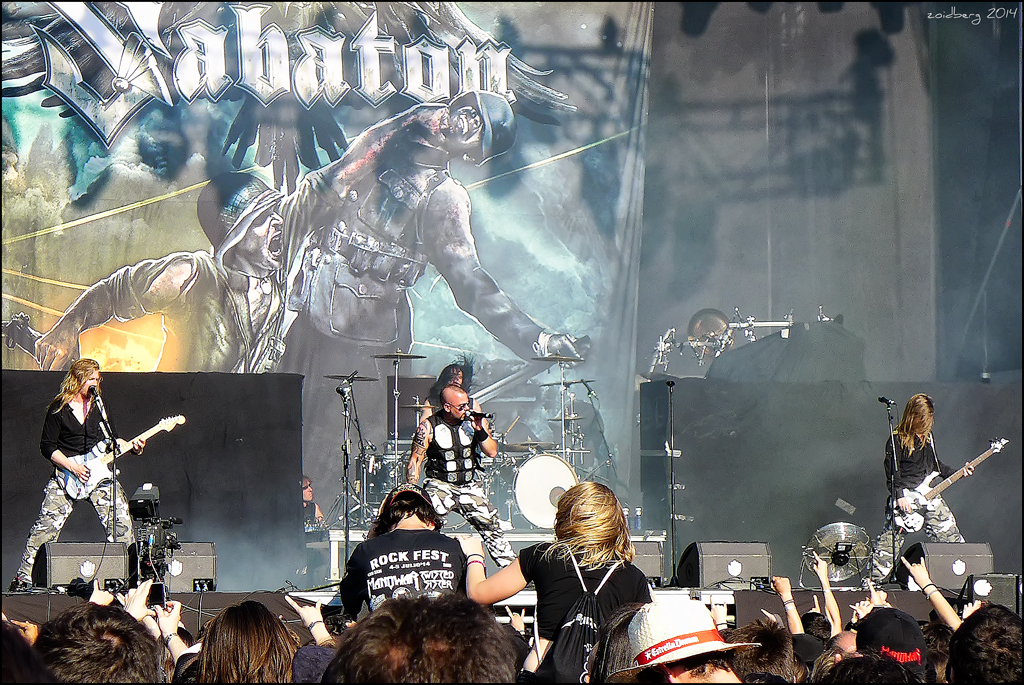
Sabaton performing at Rock Fest in 2014

In 2012, Sabaton released a new concept album Carolus Rex. In the same year, two-thirds of the band's lineup left. On 31 March, Joakim Brodén confirmed rumors that the band would be going separate ways, with only himself and Pär Sundström staying on board. Sabaton was joined by new members Chris Rörland and Thobbe Englund on guitar, and Robban Bäck on drums. Former guitarists Oskar Montelius and Rikard Sundén, drummer Daniel Mullback and keyboardist Daniel Mÿhr went on, together with vocalist Nils Patrik Johansson and bassist Stefan Eriksson, to form a new band, Civil War. In November 2012, Robban Bäck decided to take a break from touring due to becoming a father. Snowy Shaw replaced him as touring drummer, who in turn was replaced by Hannes Van Dahl in November 2013. Prior to replacing Shaw, Van Dahl had worked as his drum technician while drumming for the band Evergrey.

In January 2014, the band announced the cover of their new album called Heroes, then due to be released on 16 May 2014. The album proved to be a hit and made #1 on the official Swedish album chart. On 27 January the band was announced to play Download Festival in June. In October 2015, Sabaton performed their first concert in Japan in Loud Park.

In December 2015, five songs by the band were added to the third external music pack for the strategy game Europa Universalis IV by Paradox Interactive.

=== The Last Stand (2016–2018) ===
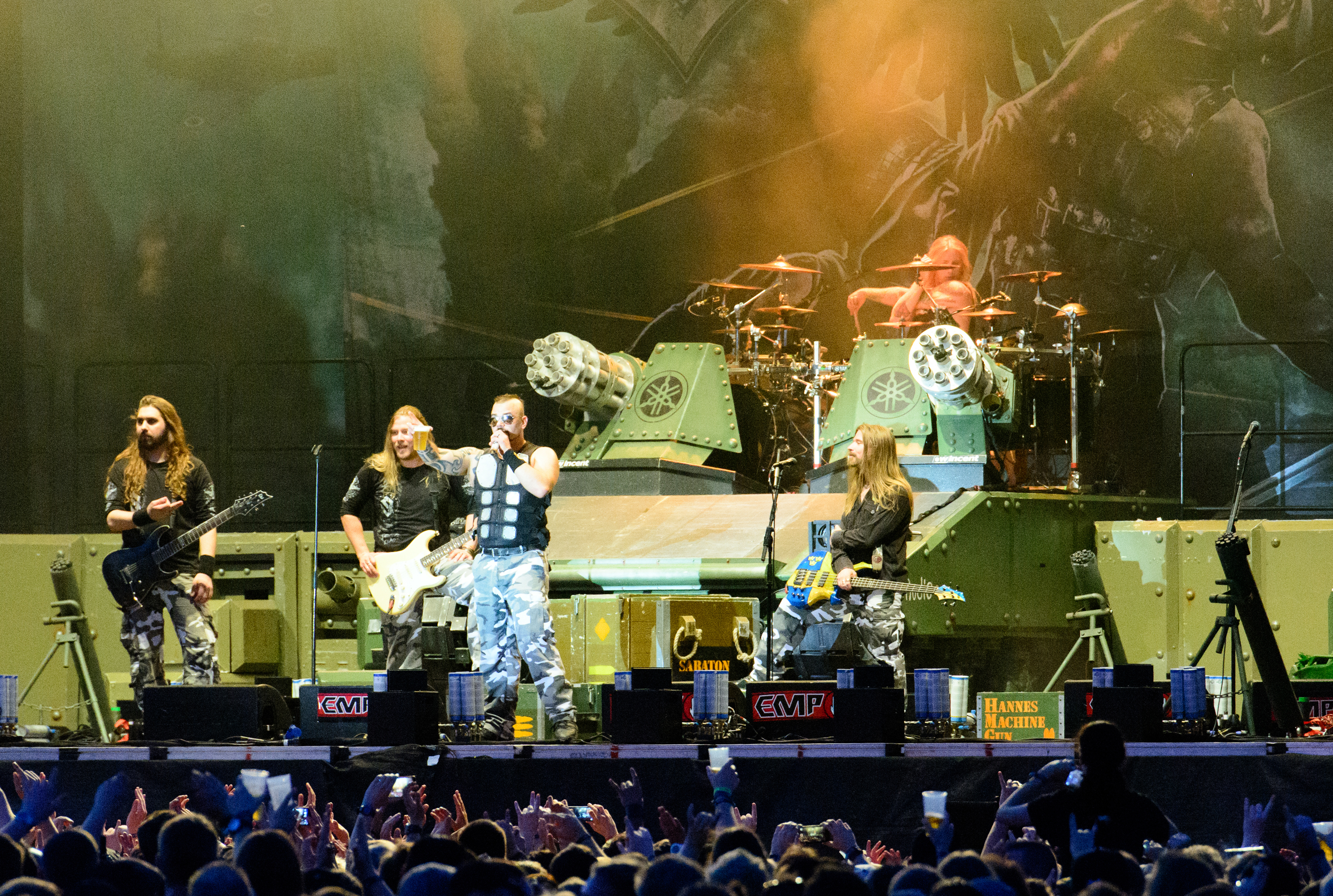
Sabaton performing in 2016

On 6 June 2016, the 72nd anniversary of D-Day, they released a music pack for the video game Hearts of Iron IV with songs based on World War II, the theme of the game. They released a second one on 26 January 2017.

Their eighth studio album, The Last Stand, was released on 19 August 2016, announced in April. On 10 June 2016 the first single of the album was released, called "The Lost Battalion" which is about the eponymous military unit of World War I. On 25 July 2016, the band announced that guitarist Thobbe Englund had left the band. Englund played his last show as a band member at Sabaton Open Air 2016, until coming back in 2024. He would, however end up occasionally wearing the camo onstage in the between years - both for Sabaton's 20th anniversary show in 2019, and also at a Falun show of their 2022 Swedish Tour. Tommy Johansson of Majestica was announced immediately as the new member at Englund's final Sabaton show. He also played the last song of that show (20 August 2016) onstage with Englund and the rest of the band.

In 2017, Hannes Van Dahl announced he was stepping away from the band for their 2017 European tour with Accept and Twilight Force, while he welcomed his first child with wife Floor Jansen. Daniel Sjögren from Twilight Force replaced him for the shows.

The band's show on the 2017 Masters of Rock festival in Vizovice, Czech Republic was accompanied by the Zlín Philharmonic Orchestra. Classical arrangement of the songs were made by Christofer Johnsson from Therion.

Pär Sundström stated in a 2017 interview that the group would be touring less in 2018 so they could concentrate on writing and recording their next album. Joakim Brodén confirmed a 2019 release date for the still-untitled album in a September 2018 interview on MAD TV's show TV War. On 31 December 2018, it was further confirmed in an official announcement YouTube video.

=== Sabaton History and The Great War (2019–2021) ===
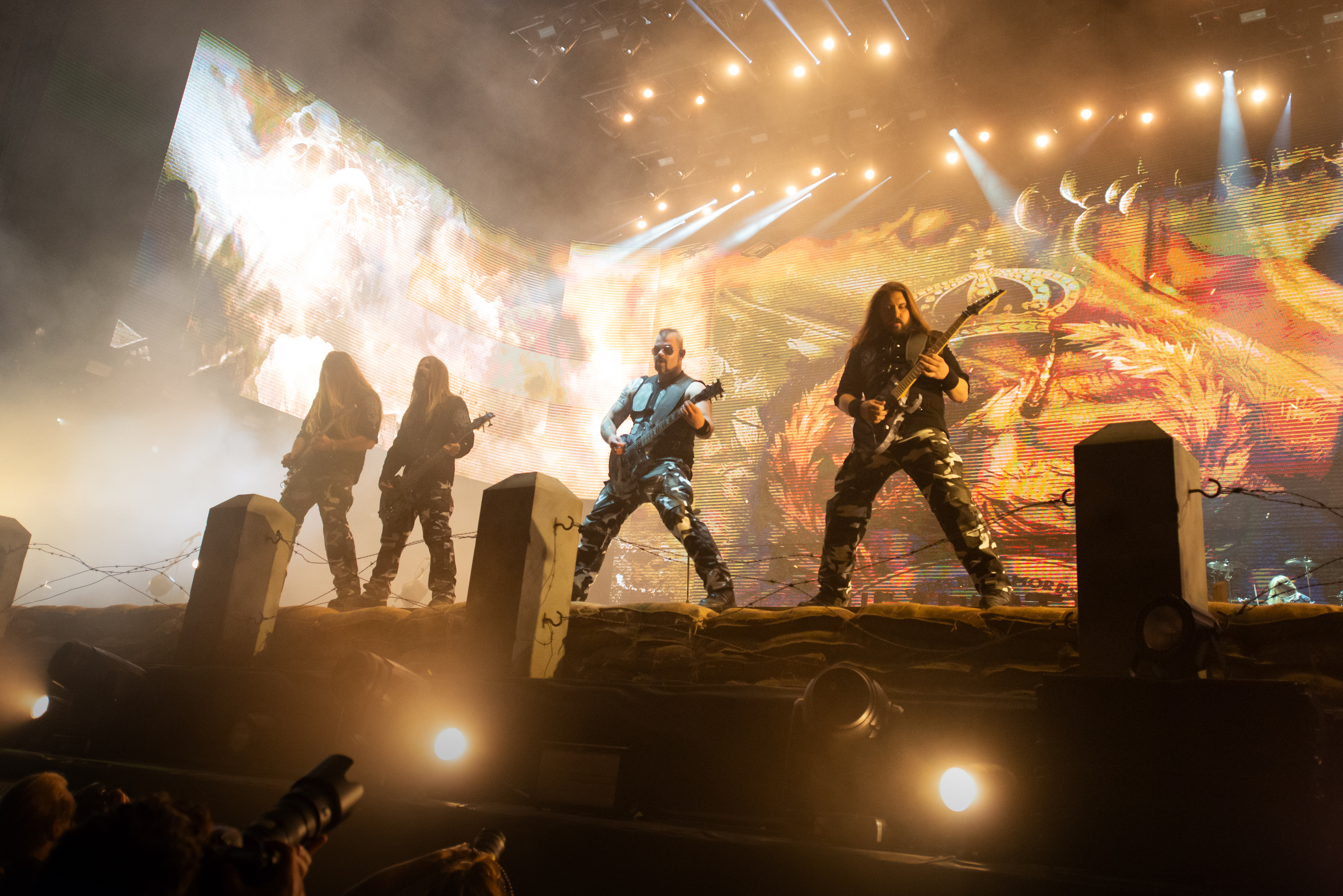
Sabaton performing at Hellfest in 2019

On 8 January 2019, the band announced the creation of a YouTube channel called Sabaton History, a cooperation between Indy Neidell, TimeGhost History and Sabaton. The channel documents the history of the events behind Sabaton songs and the songs themselves. The channel was created on 7 February 2019.

On 22 April 2019, Sabaton released a standalone single, "Bismarck", in a collaboration with Wargaming and their game World of Warships. The song is about the German battleship Bismarck, one of the biggest ever built in Europe. Commissioned in August 1940, it sank in May 1941 after an intense hunt in the North Atlantic.

On 2 April 2019, the band announced a new concept album about the First World War entitled The Great War. On 5 May 2019, they played in Plzeň on the anniversary of the Prague uprising. The album was released on 19 July 2019. The first single on the album, "Fields of Verdun", was released on 3 May. The song was co-written with then-former member Thobbe Englund, who also played the solo. On 13 June, the lyric video for the song about "Red Baron", titled, "The Red Baron", was released. On 27 June, the premiere of "The Great War" was released.

On 1 August 2019, the band performed their 20th anniversary show at Wacken Open Air festival 2019; during the gig, Thobbe Englund joined the band on stage for two songs. In the second half of the show, Sabaton invited other former members, and current members of Civil War to the festival's second stage - Rikard Sundén, Daniel Mÿhr, and Daniel Mullback, along with Englund.

On 30 August 2019, the band was involved in a serious car accident in Tunisia while returning from a music video shoot for the song "Seven Pillars of Wisdom" in the Sahara Desert. Injuries from the wreck forced them to cancel a show in Gdańsk, Poland. The video for "Seven Pillars of Wisdom" was released in December, with Indy Neidell playing T.E. Lawrence. They returned to the stage in October with Hammerfall, for a tour of North America.

In January 2020, Sabaton embarked on The Great Tour in Europe, playing twenty-two shows. The support acts were Amaranthe and Apocalyptica. The shows would be their last that year, due to the COVID-19 pandemic. However, they made an appearance at Wacken Worldwide, a livestreamed version of Wacken Open Air, performing on a virtual stage. On 23 December 2020, Sabaton posted a short teaser of a new song on YouTube, writing: "We bet you did not see this one coming.. Are you ready for some new Sabaton music? Wait no more! Hear now a teaser of one of our upcoming songs.." They released "Livgardet", the Swedish version of a new single, on 26 February 2021, with the English version released on 9 April. The song is a tribute to the Swedish regiment Livgardet, the Royal Guard, released in relation to its 500-year anniversary as a military unit, making it one of the world's longest serving military units. The song was initially done in cooperation with the Swedish Armed Forces and Livgardet regiment, but the cooperation was halted after orders from the Swedish Army Command, citing as a reason that Sabaton had played in Crimea in 2015 on a festival hosted by the Russian motorcycle gang Night Wolves.

On 7 May 2021, a single called "Defence of Moscow", an English cover of a Sabaton-inspired song in Russian by Radio Tapok, was released. He joined the band onstage in Moscow to perform "Attack of the Dead Men".

=== Single releases, The War to End All Wars and films (2021–2025) ===
On 10 August 2021, Sabaton posted a teaser for 14 August in Morse code translating to "the war to end all wars". This then led to the announcement on 14 August 2021 of their new album continuing on the subject of World War I with the title The War to End All Wars. Earlier, at the Exit Festival in Novi Sad in July, the band had previewed an upcoming animated music video with Yarnhub Studios for the album's track: "Lady of the Dark", about Milunka Savic. The album was released on 4 March 2022. The first single, "Christmas Truce", was released on 29 October 2021. The second single, "Soldier of Heaven", was released on 7 January 2022. The third single, "The Unkillable Soldier", was released on 11 February 2022. Indy Neidell played Adrian Carton de Wiart in the music video.

On 25 August 2021, the song "Steel Commanders" was released in support of new Sabaton content in the popular video game World of Tanks. Tina Guo, who previously joined the band onstage at Wacken Open Air Festival 2019, performed an electric cello solo. It was later selected by Loudwire as the 33rd best metal song of 2021.

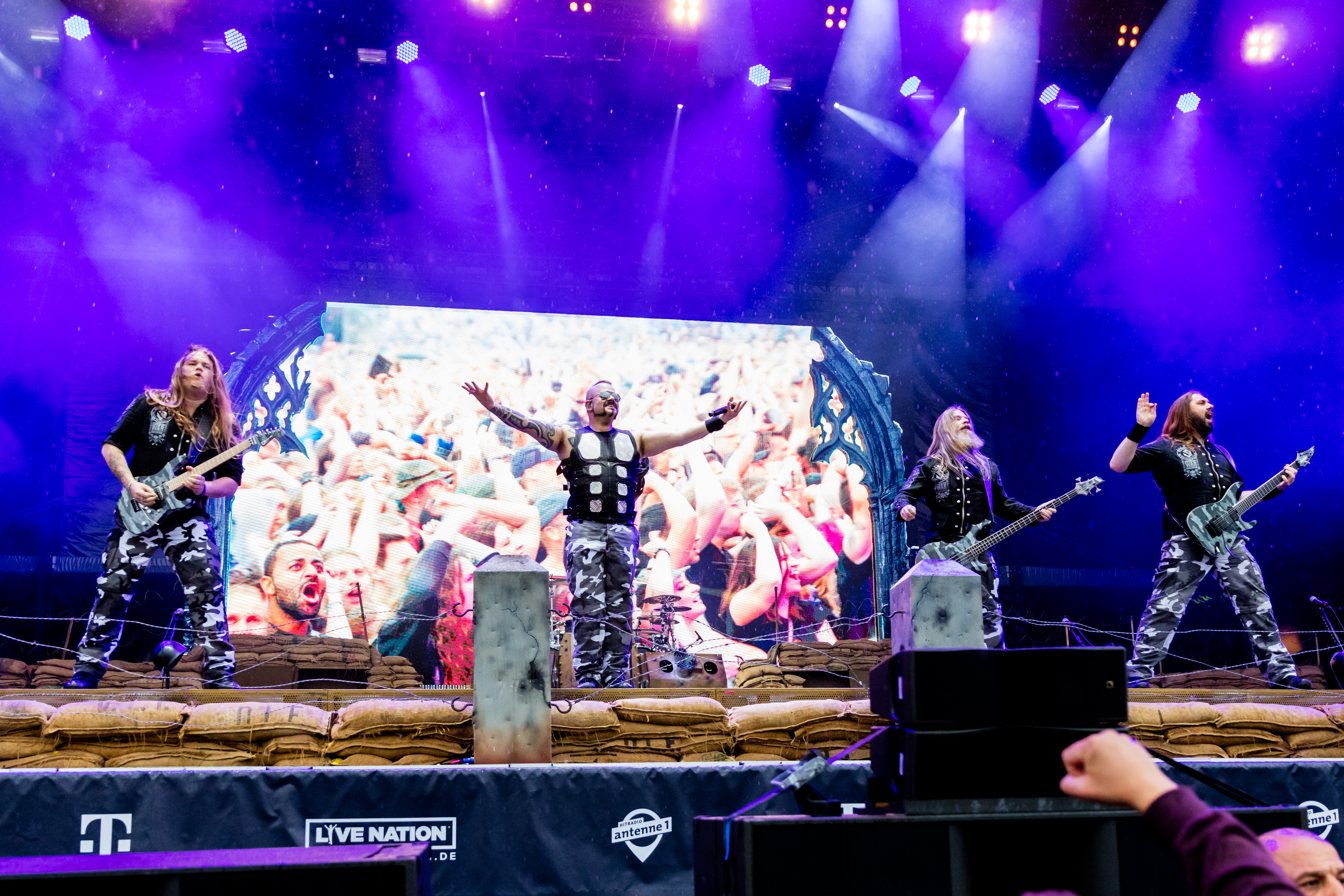
Sabaton at Download Festival 2022 in Germany

On 14 April 2022, Sabaton played a concert in their hometown of Falun. Then-former guitarist, Thobbe Englund joined them for a few songs.

On 30 September 2022, the song "Father" about German scientist Fritz Haber was released as the first single from their EP Weapons of the Modern Age, part of a planned trilogy titled Echoes of the Great War. Another single, titled "The First Soldier", was released on 20 January 2023, with the EP titled Heroes of the Great War.

On 14 April 2023, Sabaton released a cover of Motörhead's song "1916" along with the EP titled Stories from the Western Front, which was the final part of the trilogy. Also in April, the band started their European tour, The Tour to End All Tours, which had been postponed from 2020 due to the COVID-19 pandemic. Supporting the band were Lordi and Babymetal. Sabaton had previously opened for the latter in Japan in 2018, where Joakim Brodén recorded a song with them, titled, "Oh! Majinai".

Guitarist Tommy Johansson announced his departure on 20 January 2024, to focus on his other projects. Thobbe Englund returned to the band in Johansson's place on 9 February 2024.

Sabaton released a concert film, The Tour to End All Tours, in cinemas globally on 11 October 2024, bringing the film to over 600 cinemas in 24 countries. The film was a live recording of the band's 2023 concert in Amsterdam.

The band released an animated movie based on their album The War to End All Wars in museums across the world in 2023. The movie was a collaboration with the studio, Yarnhub, who have also done animations for some of the band's music videos. On 11 March 2025, the movie was released on streaming platforms Apple TV, Amazon Prime, and YouTube Movies.

=== Legends (2025–present) ===
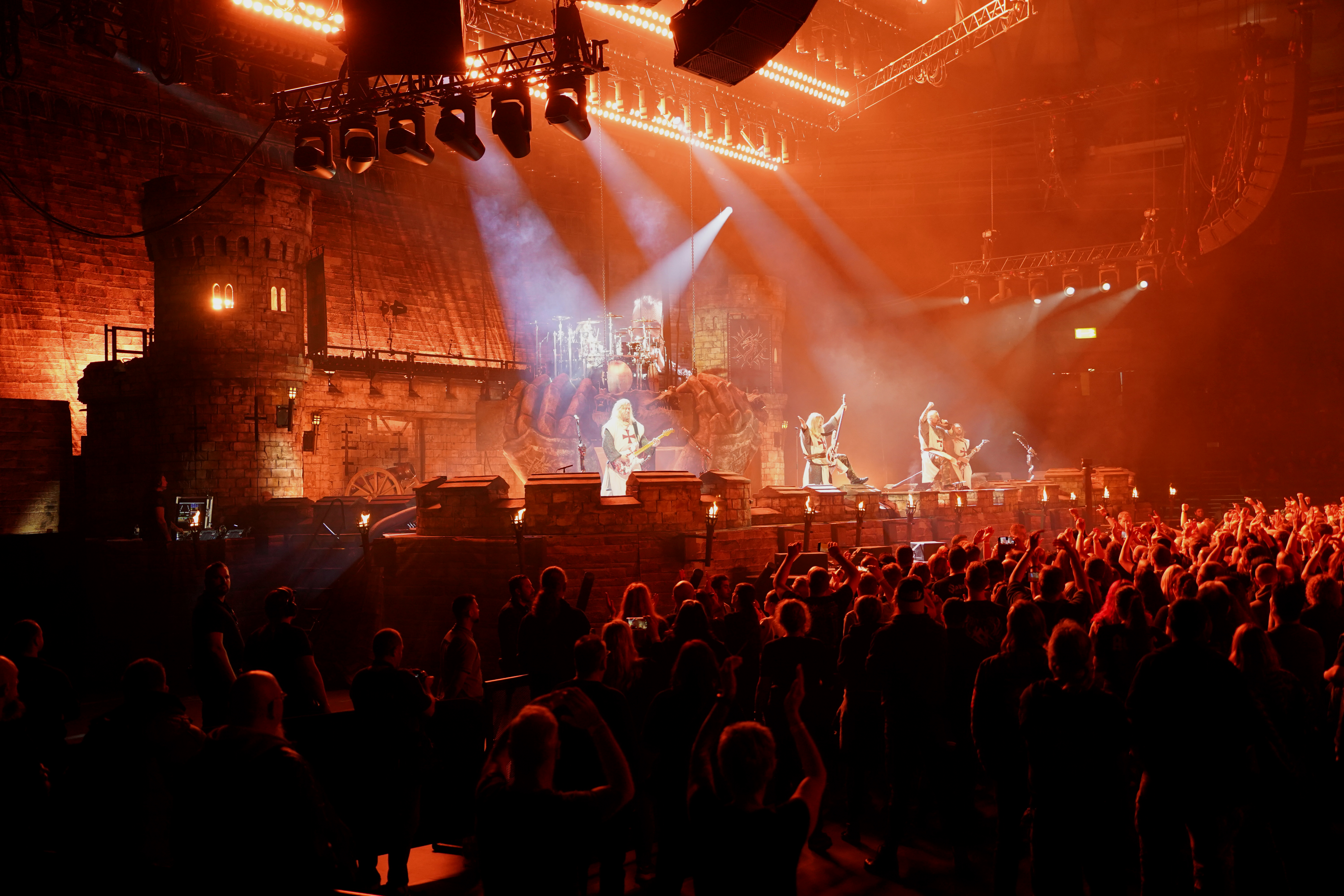
Sabaton performing in Stuttgart, 2025.

In May 2025, Sabaton played some shows in South America. In June, they returned to Sweden Rock Festival for the first time in a decade. In September they will return to Australia, with support from Amaranthe. They will then play their debut shows in New Zealand. In October, Sabaton will return to Istanbul, Turkey. After that, they will play their first shows in Moldova and Kazakhstan.

Sabaton will commence The Legendary Tour in late 2025, playing twenty-two shows in Europe featuring The Legendary Orchestra, wrapping up the tour in their home country of Sweden.

On 12 April 2025, Sabaton announced the single "Templars" (which depicts the titular Knights Templars) which was released on 25 April 2025. This was the first material released under their new contract with Better Noise Music, however, the single and the album was completed before the band moved to the label. The music video for "Templars" was filmed in Serbia at Belgrade Fortress and Smederevo Fortress. On 6 June 2025, the band released another single titled "Hordes of Khan", about Genghis Khan. The band released two more singles on 25 July 2025, "The Duelist," about Samurai Miyamoto Musashi and "Lightning at the Gates," about Hannibal and his invasion of Rome. On the same day, the band announced their eleventh studio album, Legends, which was released on 17 October 2025.

== Lyrical and musical style ==
The band's main lyrical themes are based on war, historical battles, and acts of heroism, influenced by bands such as Iron Maiden. Their name is a reference to the sabaton, a form of medieval foot armor. The armor and battle theme is heard in most songs on almost every album except Metalizer. In their albums The Great War and The War To End All Wars, which were released on 19 July 2019 and 4 March 2022, all the songs were based on World War I. Lyrical content drawn from World War I, World War II and other historical conflicts is prevalent and lyrics often recite stories of heroic deeds by men, women, and armies, such as the song "White Death", honoring legendary Finnish sniper Simo Häyhä.

Sabaton is often referred to as a power metal band by both music critics and the general public, deemed "a major force in the power metal field since the mid-2000s", and have been referred to as one of the "big four" power metal bands by Loudwire along with Blind Guardian, DragonForce and Helloween in November 2021. However, the band has traditionally rejected the label, preferring to consider themselves a unique form of heavy metal. Bassist Pär Sundström said in an interview: "I don't think Sabaton can only be categorized as power metal, as the two main attributes of power metal are high pitched vocals and fantasy lyrics and Sabaton have neither of those. We simply play our version of heavy metal—what heavy metal is to us. I'm sure that has impacted our reach, in addition to the fact that we don't give up after only a few tries! That, and Sabaton's music appeals to people of all ages."

== Public image ==
=== Russo-Ukrainian war ===
In 2015, the band performed at a show organized by Putin loyalist motorcycle club Night Wolves in Russian-occupied Crimea, and bassist Pär Sundström stated in an interview with Sweden Rock Magazine in 2016, when he was asked about that trip: "If you go to Sevastopol, you hardly feel that they feel occupied", adding: "All these years they have felt like Russians but [been] treated like a small piece of Ukraine." Pär has since specified that his original quotes were referring to "how I experienced the situation there and then", adding: "That someone invades or occupies another country is against international law."

In 2022, Sabaton received the Public Educator Award from the Swedish Skeptics Association for the historical information which they publish on their homepage and through one of their YouTube channels. The award is traditionally presented to academics, authors, journalists and media outlets that go above and beyond what is expected in order to educate people. The concert and comments mentioned above, and the resultant public debate in Sweden, caused the Swedish Skeptics Association to review the award. The review found that withdrawal of the award was not justified.

Sabaton distanced itself from Russia and participated in a demonstration, in Hartlepool, England, against the invasion of Ukraine on 3 March 2022, very shortly after the beginning of the war. They also released an official statement on 15 March 2022: "Our upcoming album 'The War To End All Wars' deals with a conflict that ended over a century ago, and we're deeply saddened to now see mankind repeat the mistakes of generations past. There has been more than enough bloodshed throughout history. No need for more."

== Band members ==
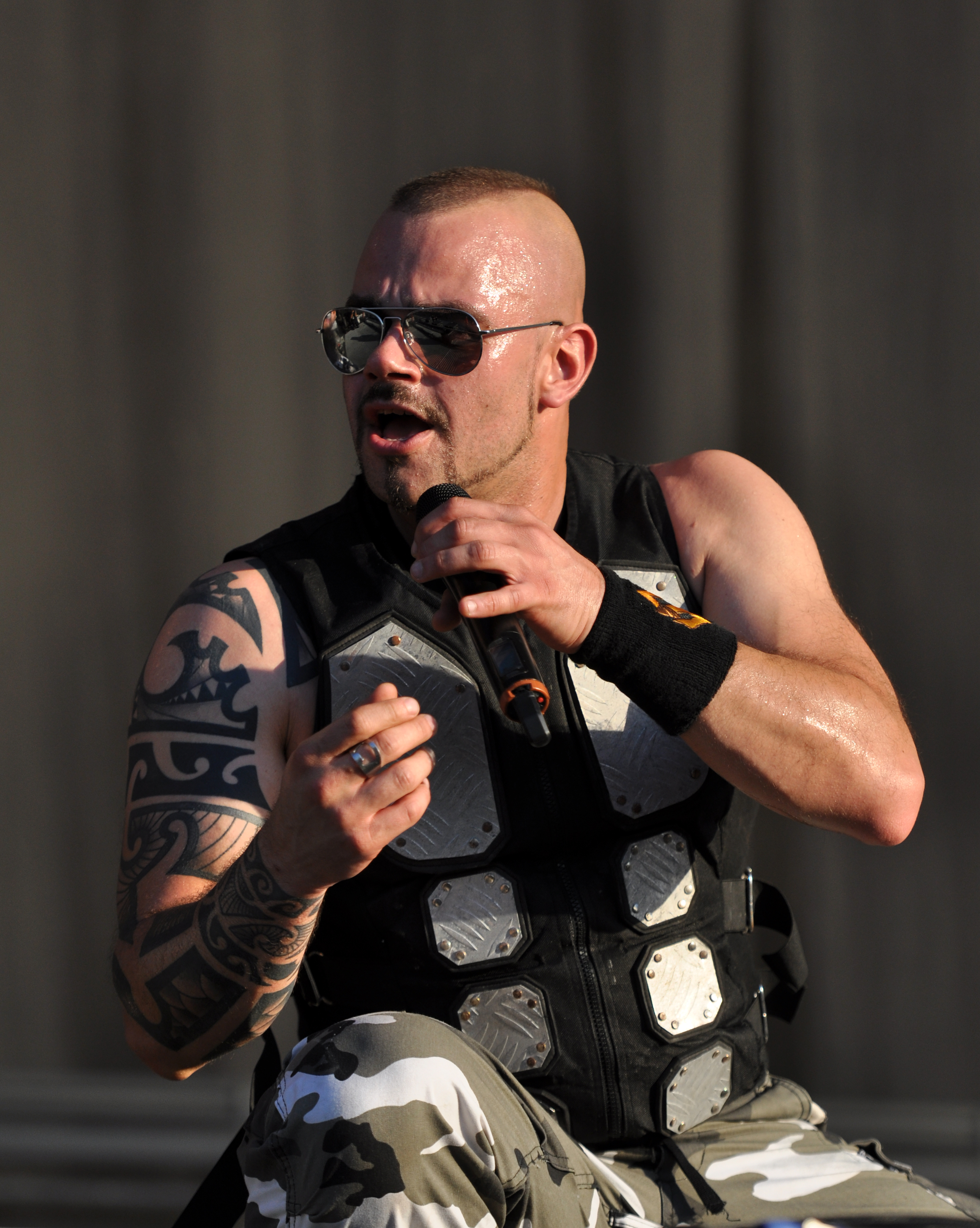
Joakim Brodén at Wacken Open Air

=== Current ===
- Joakim Brodén – lead vocals, occasional rhythm guitar (1999–present), keyboards (1999–2005, 2012–present)
- Pär Sundström – bass (1999–present), backing vocals (2012–present)
- Chris Rörland – lead guitar, backing vocals (2012–present)
- Hannes Van Dahl – drums, backing vocals (2013–present)
- Thobbe Englund – lead guitar, backing vocals (2012–2016, 2024–present)

=== Former ===
- Oskar Montelius – lead guitar, backing vocals (1999–2012)
- Rikard Sundén – lead guitar, backing vocals (1999–2012)
- Daniel Mullback – drums, backing vocals (1999–2012)
- Daniel Mÿhr – keyboards, backing vocals (2005–2012)
- Robban Bäck – drums (2012–2013)
- Tommy Johansson – lead guitar, backing vocals (2016–2024)

=== Touring ===
- Frédéric Leclercq – lead guitar (2011; substitute for Rikard Sundén)
- Snowy Shaw – drums (2012–2013; substitute for Robban Bäck)
- Daniel Sjögren – drums (2017; substitute for Hannes Van Dahl)

== Discography ==
- Primo Victoria (2005)
- Attero Dominatus (2006)
- Metalizer (2007)
- The Art of War (2008)
- Coat of Arms (2010)
- Carolus Rex (2012)
- Heroes (2014)
- The Last Stand (2016)
- The Great War (2019)
- The War to End All Wars (2022)
- Legends (2025)

== Awards ==
Metal Hammer Golden Gods Awards
Year	Nominee / work	Award	Result
2011	Sabaton	Best Breakthrough Band	Won
2012	Sabaton	Metal As Fuck	Nominated
2013	Sabaton	Best Live Band	Nominated
2018	Sabaton	Best Live Band	Nominated

Metal Hammer Awards (GER)
Year	Nominee / work	Award	Result
2012	Sabaton	Best Live Band	Won

Bandit Rock Awards
Year	Nominee / work	Award	Result
2012	Sabaton	Best Swedish Group	Won
2012	Sabaton	Best Swedish Live Act	Won
2013	Carolus Rex	Best Swedish Album	Won
2013	Sabaton	Best Swedish Live Act	Won
2013	Sabaton	Best Swedish Group / Artist	Won

Rockbjörnen
Year	Nominee / work	Award	Result
2013	Sabaton	The Year's hard rock/metal	Won

Föreningen Vetenskap och Folkbildning
Year	Nominee / work	Award	Result
2022	Sabaton	Enlightener of the year	Won

In 2008, the then-presiding archbishop of Gdansk, Sławoj Leszek Głódź, awarded Sabaton with an authentic Polish officer sabre. The background was that the band had highlighted Polish soldiers in some of their songs.

In 2016, on tour in Brazil, Sabaton was invited to visit the Expeditionary Museum in Curitiba. There, the band was awarded the "Tenente Max Wolff Filho" medal (for bringing to life the story of these heroes on the now classic song "Smoking Snakes"), a distinction that had previously only been awarded to two foreigners, both ex-combatants – an Italian partisan and a Russian veteran – now residing in Brazil.
