= The Art of War (Sabaton album) =

2008 studio album by Sabaton

Studio album by Sabaton
- Released: 30 May 2008
- Recorded: September 2007 – January 2008
- Studio: The Abyss (Pärlby, Sweden)
- Genre: Power metal
- Length: 49:28
- Label: Black Lodge Records
- Producer: Sabaton, Tommy & Peter Tägtgren

Sabaton chronology
Metalizer (2007)	The Art of War (2008)	Coat of Arms (2010)

Singles from The Art of War
- 1. ""Cliffs of Gallipoli"" Released: 30 May 2008

Re-Armed edition
- Front cover of the 2010 reissue

Professional ratings
Review scores
Source	Rating
AllMusic	3/5 stars
Jukebox:Metal	4/5 stars
Encyclopaedia Metallum	7.8/10 stars
Metal Storm	8.51/10 stars

The Art of War is the fourth album by the Swedish power metal band Sabaton.

The album is based on the ancient Chinese military treatise, The Art of War written by General Sun Tzu in the 6th century BC. It consists of 13 chapters, each of which describe a different aspect of warfare, and is considered the definitive work on military tactics and strategies of its time. The tracks on the album correspond to each chapter of treatise. The lyrics of the songs are about famous battles or war, mostly based on the battles of the First and Second World Wars where Sun Tzu's tactics were applied.

Since the album's release, the song "Ghost Division" has served as the opening song for most of Sabaton's concerts.

== Production ==
The Swedish national anthem from Sweden Rock '09 (found on the Re-Armed edition) was the only song on which bassist Pär Sundström has contributed vocals until 2012, when the line-up change required Sundström to step up to the microphone on a more permanent basis.

Spoken quotes from Sun Tzu's The Art of War can be heard in songs such as "Sun Tzu Says", "The Art of War", "Unbreakable", "The Nature of Warfare", "Cliffs of Gallipoli", "Union (Slopes of St. Benedict)", "The Price of a Mile", "Firestorm", and "A Secret". These quotes are taken from LibriVox's audiobook version of the book, which follows the Lionel Giles translation.

At time of writing, "Unbreakable" was intended to describe a particular historical guerrilla warfare action; however, songwriters Joakim Brodén and Pär Sundström have since forgotten which one they were thinking of.

== Track listing ==
No.	Title	Lyrics	Music	Theme	Length
1.	"Sun Tzu Says"			First two sentences of Sun Tzu’s The Art of War	0:23
2.	"Ghost Division"	Joakim Brodén, Pär Sundström	Brodén	The 7th Panzer Division in the Battle of France	3:51
3.	"The Art of War"	Brodén	Brodén	The third chapter ("Planning offensives") of Sun Tzu’s The Art of War	5:08
4.	"40:1"	Brodén, Sundström	Brodén	The Battle of Wizna	4:10
5.	"Unbreakable"	Brodén, Sundström	Brodén	Guerrilla warfare	5:58
6.	"The Nature of Warfare"			The sixth chapter ("Vacuity and Substance") of Sun Tzu’s The Art of War	1:18
7.	"Cliffs of Gallipoli"	Brodén, Sundström	Brodén	The Gallipoli Campaign	5:51
8.	"Talvisota"	Sundström	Brodén	The Winter War	3:32
9.	"Panzerkampf"	Brodén, Sundström	Brodén	The Battle of Kursk from the Soviet perspective	5:15
10.	"Union (Slopes of St. Benedict)"	Brodén, Sundström	Brodén	The Italian campaign and the Battle of Monte Cassino from the allied perspective	4:05
11.	"The Price of a Mile"	Brodén, Sundström	Brodén	The Battle of Passchendaele and senseless slaughter of World War I in general	5:55
12.	"Firestorm"	Brodén, Sundström	Brodén	Carpet bombing campaigns in World War II	3:25
13.	"A Secret"			A humorous outro addressing music piracy	0:37
Total length:					49:28

Re-armed edition bonus tracks
No.	Title	Theme	Length
14.	"Swedish Pagans"	The Vikings	4:13
15.	"Glorious Land"	A song about military forces defending their homeland	3:19
16.	"The Art of War"	Pre-production demo version	4:48
17.	"Swedish National Anthem (Live at Sweden Rock Festival)"	Swedish National Anthem	2:34
Total length:			14:54

== Different versions ==
The Art of War was released in three different versions, a standard edition containing only the CD, a vinyl version and a Limited Edition. The limited contains the full-length CD and the book The Art of War by Sun Tzu. The limited edition comes in a DVD case with alternate artwork. All preorders from the official Sabaton homepage also included the single, Cliffs of Gallipoli. In 2010, the album was re-released with other early Sabaton albums under their new label in a "Re-Armed" version that included several new bonus tracks.

== Personnel ==
- Joakim Brodén – vocals
- Rickard Sundén – guitars
- Oskar Montelius – guitars
- Pär Sundström – bass
- Daniel Mullback – drums
- Daniel Mÿhr – keyboards

== Charts ==
Chart (2008)	Peak position
Swedish Albums (Sverigetopplistan)	5

== In popular culture ==
"40:1" became a hit in Poland and Sabaton was asked to perform it on the Polish Independence Day celebration in Gdańsk in 2008. "40:1" is also used as an entrance song by Polish mixed martial artist Damian Grabowski.

The title track was featured in the Sabaton Soundtrack DLC for the grand strategy game Europa Universalis IV.
