= Holy Father =

Holy Father may refer to:

- God the Father, the title given to the first person of the Trinity in Christianity and sometimes to a god in other religions
- An honorific often used instead of, or prefixed to, the name of the Catholic Pope
- An Eastern Orthodox usage referring to one of the Church Fathers
