= Tommy Johansson (musician) =

Swedish guitarist and singer

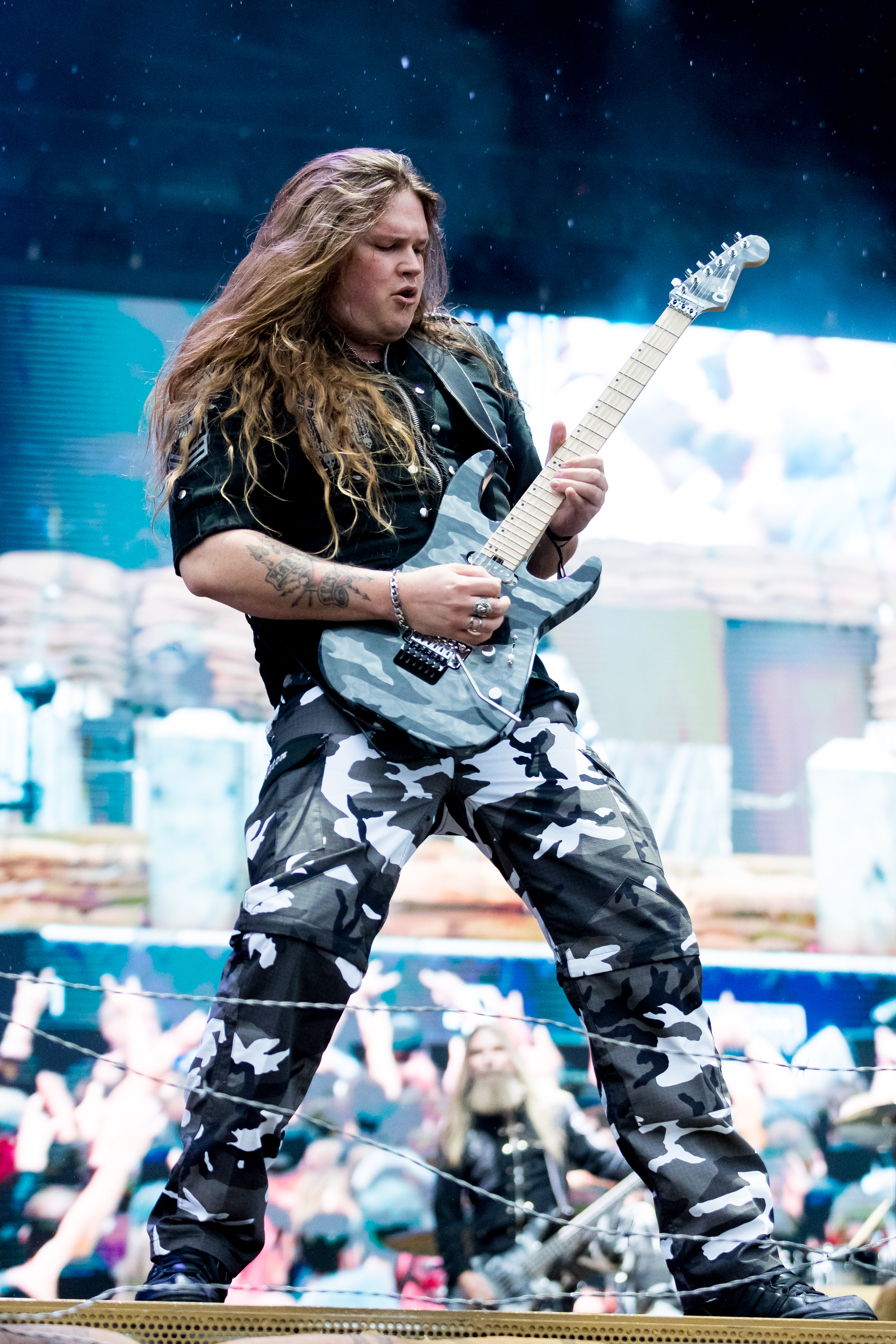
- Johansson with Sabaton in 2022

Background information
- Also known as: ReinXeed
- Born: 26 October 1987 (age 39); Boden, Sweden
- Genres: Power metal; symphonic metal; neoclassical metal; heavy metal
- Occupation: Musician
- Instruments: Guitar; vocals; keyboards; bass; drums; keytar; accordion; flutes; harmonica; nyckelharpa; banjo
- Years active: 2000s–present
- Member of: Majestica; Golden Resurrection
- Formerly of: Symphony of Tragedy; Memories of Old; Sabaton
- Website: tommyjohanssonofficial.com

Tommy "ReinXeed" Johansson (born 26 October 1987) is a Swedish multi-instrumentalist and singer. He is known for his work as a guitarist for the power metal band Sabaton and as lead vocalist and guitarist of the power metal band Majestica (formerly ReinXeed). He is a tenor. He is an active YouTuber, uploading many metal cover songs.

In 2009, Johansson was Karaoke Music Champion in Sweden. In 2016, Johansson joined Sabaton as a guitarist, replacing Thobbe Englund. He left the band in 2024 to pursue his own musical career, making way for Englund to return. Johansson has recorded three albums with Christian melodic neoclassical power metal band Golden Resurrection alongside singer Christian Liljegren of Narnia.

== Discography ==
With Sabaton:

- The Great War (2019)
- The War to End All Wars (2022)

With Reinxeed/Majestica:

- The Light (2008)
- Higher (2009)
- Majestic (2010)
- 1912 (2011)
- Swedish Hitz Goes Metal (2011)
- Welcome to the Theater (2012)
- A New World (2013)
- Swedish Hitz Goes Metal Vol.2 (2013)
- Above the Sky (2019)
- A Christmas Carol (2020)
- Metal United (single) (2021)
- A New Beginning (single) (2024)
- Power Train (2025)

With Golden Resurrection:

- Glory to My King (2010)
- Man with a Mission (2011)
- One Voice for the Kingdom (2013)

With Memories of Old:

- The Land of Xia (single) (2019)
- Zera's Shadow (single) (2019)
- Some Day Soon (single) (2020)
- The Zeramin Game (2020)

With Dampf:

- The Arrival (2022)
