= Pär Sundström =

Swedish bassist

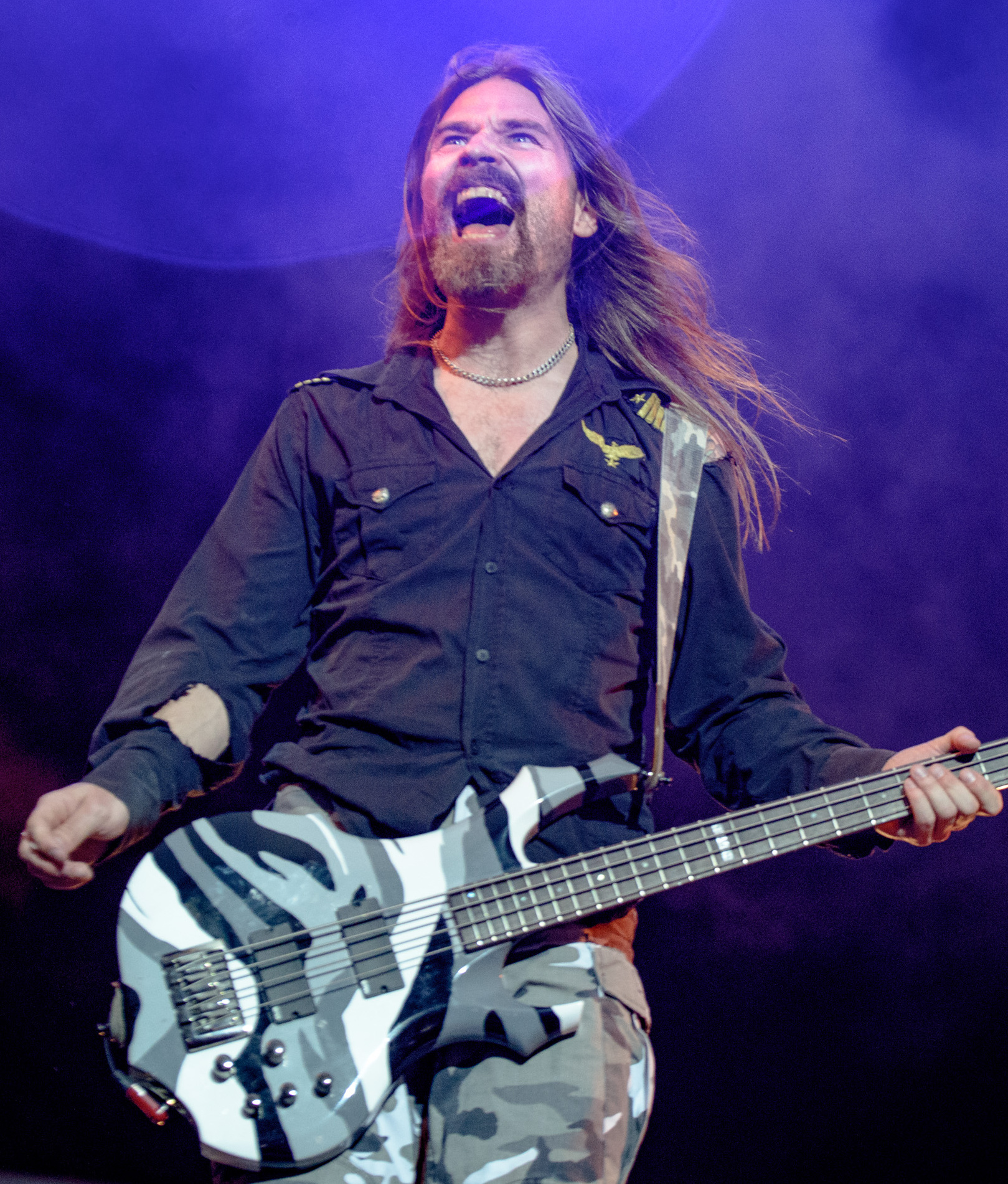
- Sundström in 2016

Background information
- Born: 8 June 1981 (age 45); Falun, Sweden
- Genres: Power metal
- Occupation: Bassist
- Years active: 1999–present
- Member of: Sabaton

Pär Sundström (born 8 June 1981) is a Swedish bass guitarist. He and Joakim Brodén are the last remaining founding members of the power metal band Sabaton. He is also the band's manager and one of the band's lyricists, along with Brodén.

== Biography ==
Sundström was born in Falun, Dalarna County. During his youth, he played mainly in black and death metal bands. In 1999, he founded Sabaton with Joakim Brodén. Shortly after, Oskar Montelius joined the band. Concerning his role in Sabaton, he stated in an interview with metalheadspotted.com: "I do a lot of stuff that is necessary for the band as manager."

Before Sabaton became a professional band, Sundström worked for two years "as a manager of a big company". His management office, as well as the band's studio, are based in Falun. However in 2017, Sundström moved to Limassol, Cyprus, where he founded the Swedish Empire Touring company for Sabaton's merchandising.

Sundström has one sister. His main musical influences are Twisted Sister, especially Dee Snider, as well as Skid Row. Aside from Twisted Sister and Skid Row, Sundström speaks of Iron Maiden, Scorpions, Guns N' Roses, and Raubtier as his favourite bands. In the early years of Sabaton, Sundström set up the pyrotechnics for the Sabaton live shows by himself, as he is a trained pyrotechnician.
