= St. John's School (Texas) =

Independent school in Houston, Texas, US

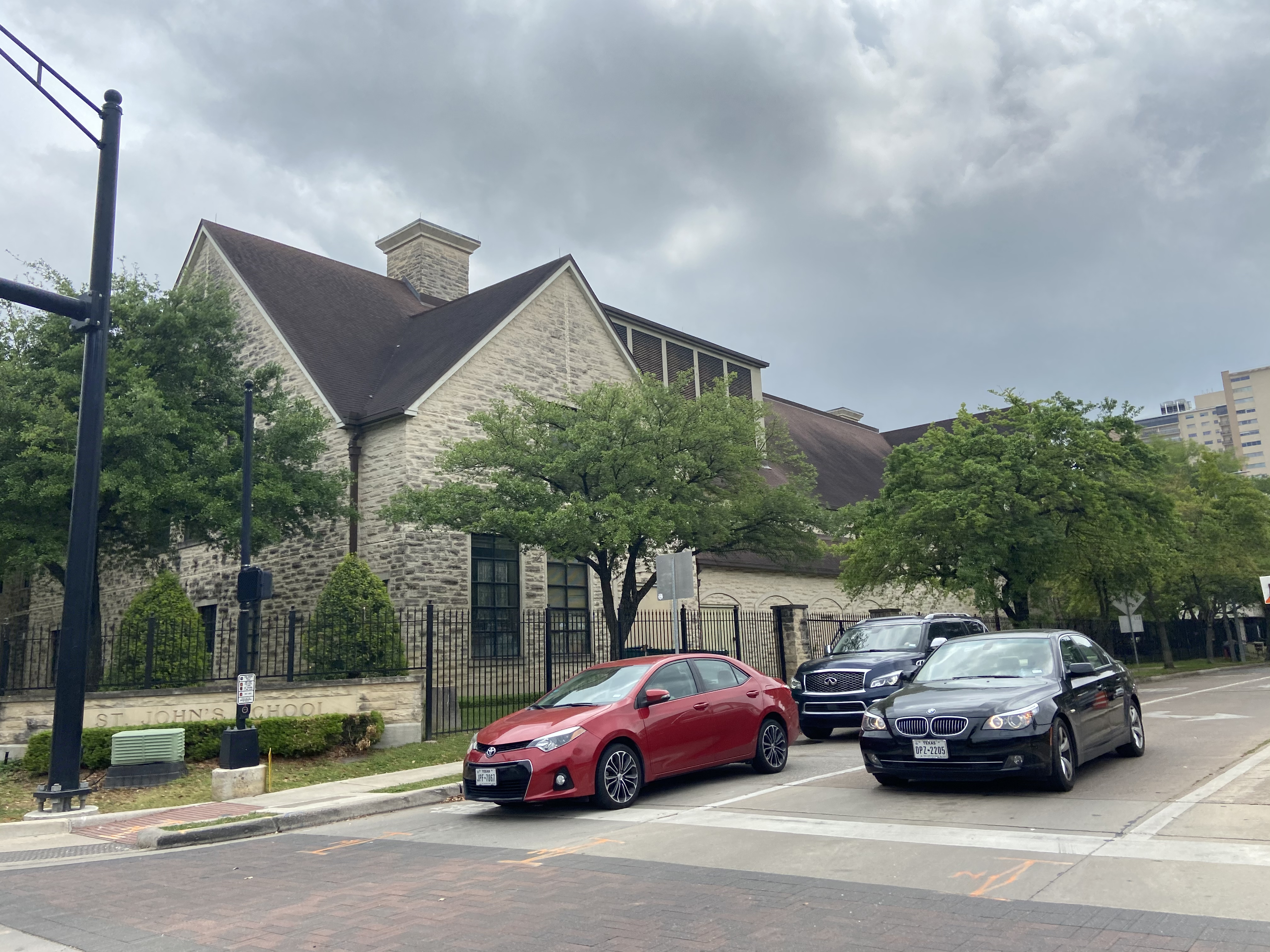

Location
- 2401 Claremont Lane; Houston, Texas 77019; United States; 29°44′28″N 95°25′42″W

Information
- Type: Independent
- Motto: Faith and Virtue
- Established: September 27, 1946; 80 years ago
- Locale: Large city
- CEEB code: 443425
- NCES School ID: BB964700
- Head of school: Daniel J. Alig
- Faculty: 205
- Grades: K–12
- Gender: Coeducational
- Enrollment: 1,423 (2023-2024)
  - Kindergarten: 42
  - Grade 1: 63
  - Grade 2: 64
  - Grade 3: 62
  - Grade 4: 64
  - Grade 5: 64
  - Grade 6: 122
  - Grade 7: 115
  - Grade 8: 120
  - Grade 9: 181
  - Grade 10: 181
  - Grade 11: 170
  - Grade 12: 175
- Average class size: 177 (upper school) 122 (middle school) 64 (lower school) 42 (kindergarten)
- Student to teacher ratio: 7:1 (upper school)
- Campus: Urban
- Area: 42 acres (17 ha)
- Colors: Red; Black
- Mascot: The Maverick
- Nickname: Crusaders (1946–1949); Rebels (1949–2004); Mavericks (2004–present)
- Rival: The Kinkaid School
- Accreditation: Independent Schools Association of the Southwest
- Endowment: $111.8 million (2024)
- Budget: $60.1 million
- Tuition: $30,000–$37,000
- Website: www.sjs.org

St. John's School (also known as St. John's or SJS) is a coeducational, independent K–12 day school in Houston, Texas, United States. The School was founded in 1946 and is a member of the Houston Area Independent Schools, the Independent Schools Association of the Southwest (ISAS), and the Southwest Preparatory Conference (SPC). Though situated adjacent to St. John the Divine church, St. John's claims no specific religious affiliation. For the 2025–2026 school year, tuition ranges from approximately $30,000 to $37,000.

As of June 2024, SJS's endowment is $111,800,000.

== History ==
=== Founding ===
Toward the close of World War II, W. St. John Garwood and other prominent Houstonians sought to create in Houston a "school of exacting standards" in the development of individual, spiritual, ethical, intellectual, social, and physical growth of its students. In January 1946, these Houstonians invited Alan Lake Chidsey, former headmaster of both the Pawling School (today the Trinity-Pawling School) and the Arizona Desert School and the post-war Assistant Dean of Students at the University of Chicago, to travel to Texas to speak at a gathering of interested members of the Houston community. Mr. and Mrs. W. St. John Garwood Sr., Mr. and Mrs. Merrick Phelps, Mr. R. E. Smith, Mr. J. O. Winston Jr., and the Reverend Thomas Sumners of the Church of St. John the Divine Episcopal Church were among those present at the meeting. At Mr. Chidsey's persuasion, Mrs. William S. Farish immediately committed to her involvement with the School, and many others followed.

A proposal was drafted that entailed combining forces with the St. John the Divine nursery school to create the School. St. John's first 344 students filed into St. John the Divine's chapel on Opening Day, September 27, 1946. The entire campus, located on what used to be Michael Louis Westheimer's farm, was six acres (2.4 ha).

Today, St. John's covers 41 acres (17 ha) of land and educates approximately 1,493 total students supported by over 200 faculty and staff. The School's 41 acres includes 13 acres that were purchased in late December 2012 for approximately $90 million (the Taub Property). The School's student-teacher ratio is approximately 7:1. Despite its lack of religious affiliation, the School provides non-denominational chapel services at the church of St. John the Divine throughout the academic year. In recent years, the Chapel program has branched out to offer more multicultural services, hosting speakers from a diverse range of faiths and non-religious backgrounds, such as environmentalists, athletes, and faculty or student alumni.

=== Post-founding ===
In the wake of the murder of George Floyd in 2020, several St. John's alumni, several African-American and some non-African American, issued a letter to the administration to ask it to take measures against racism.

== Campus ==
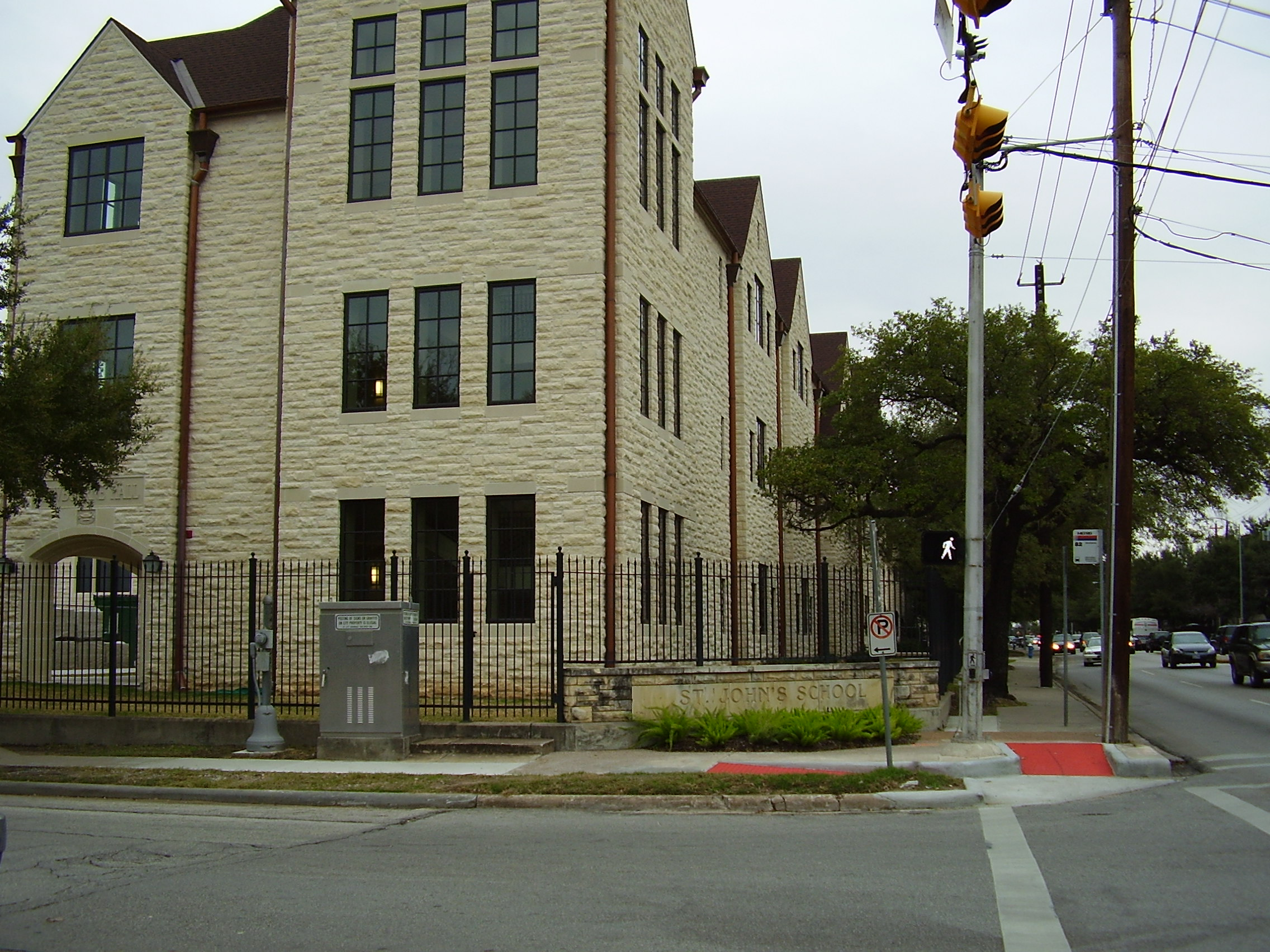
Mewbourne Hall, Cullen Campus, St. John's School

St. John's 41-acre grounds are located in the central part of Houston, Texas, specifically spanning the Upper Kirby district and the residential neighborhood of River Oaks.

The campus itself comprises two campuses, divided by Westheimer Road, that are connected by two pedestrian tunnels underneath Westheimer. The Brown (South) Campus contains the Lower School (classes K-5) and the Georges Middle School (classes 6–8) as well as the Virginia Stuller Tatham (VST) Fine Arts Center and the Smith Athletic Center. The Cullen (North) Campus houses the Upper School (classes 9–12) and the focal point of the School, the Quadrangle. The Lower, Middle, and Upper Schools each maintain their own libraries. Upper and Middle School students share the Upper School cafeteria, and the Lower School has its own.

In addition, the school's primary athletic field, Skip Lee Field, and its track are located on the South Campus to the east of the Middle School and to the south of the Lower School. The School also owns two properties neighboring the South Campus that house athletic fields (Finnegan Field and Scotty Caven Field) for field hockey, soccer, and lacrosse.

Across Buffalo Speedway from the South Campus is the Taub Property, a 13-acre property acquired by St. John's in December 2012. The school's baseball field, tennis courts, and softball field, along with temporary offices are located on the property as of March 2025.

The William Stamps Farish Quadrangle, the first building constructed, has an exterior of Austin limestone and was designed by Hiram A. Salisbury. It was built beginning in late March 1946, with an interruption from June 13 to August 30 of that year due to a strike, with the end in March 1948. The two wings were West Farish and East Farish, the former the school's first wing and named after killed in action World War II soldier William Stamps Farish Jr., and the second named after his father, William Stamps Farish Sr. The money used to build the wings originated from the wife of Farish Sr., also the mother of Farish Jr. Due to a lack of housing in the area, initially a portion of West Farish was used as faculty apartments, but they were discontinued in 1952 and converted into offices and classrooms as additional non-school housing opened. The school announced in June 2004 that it would redevelop three sides of the Quadrangle. Leigh Cutler wrote in The Houston Review that "Although the exterior design of the new building is sympathetic to old construction, much of the original materials and limestone patterns cannot be repeated."

In late 2014 the school released its master plan for the campus that included the recently acquired Taub Property. The plan was developed with the assistance of Architectural Resources Cambridge and the input of faculty, students, and alumni.

The school is adjacent to Lamar High School, a public secondary school operated by Houston Independent School District.

== Academics ==
=== College placement ===
Data released by the School reflects that, from 2010 to 2014, approximately 48% of St. John's seniors went on to matriculate at colleges and universities ranked by U.S. News & World Report as being in the Top 25 of National Universities or the Top 10 of Liberal Arts Colleges.

=== Standardized testing ===
Data for the Class of 2024 reflects a median SAT score of 1530 (out of 1600). In Reading & Writing a 760 (out of 800) and 780 (out of 800) in Math. The Class of 2025's median ACT score is 34 on a 36 scale.

For years 2012 to 2015, more than half of each SJS senior class were recognized as National Merit Semifinalists or Commended Scholars: for 2012, the percentage was 68%; for 2013, 64%; for 2014, 59%; and for 2015, 64%. Data for the 2013–2014 academic year shows that SJS led all Houston-area schools in both number (49) and percentage (35%) of National Merit Semifinalists in its senior class.

=== Students and faculty ===
Enrollment for the 2024–2025 school year is 367 for the Lower School, 400 for the Middle School, and 800 for the Upper School. Approximately 13% of students are on scholarship or financial aid. Forty-nine percent of students self-identify as being of color. There are approximately 5,862 living alumni.

The total number of faculty at SJS is 204, 157 of whom have master's or doctorate degrees.

== Student life ==
=== Athletics ===
St. John's varsity athletic teams compete in the Southwest Preparatory Conference (SPC). St. John's offers sports in each of three seasons (fall, winter and spring). In the fall, it offers cheerleading, cross country, field hockey (girls only), football (boys only), and volleyball. In the winter, it offers basketball, cheerleading, soccer, swimming & diving, and wrestling (boys only). In the spring, it offers baseball (boys only), golf, lacrosse, softball (girls only), tennis, and track & field.

In a tradition that began in 1951, St. John's plays its annual homecoming football game against crosstown rival The Kinkaid School at Rice Stadium. However, the location of the game has changed from Rice University to alternating between the two schools since 2025.

=== Arts ===
Students can participate in the arts in classes for academic credit, performing ensembles, and extracurricular organizations or performances.

The oldest extracurricular arts organization at St. John's is Johnnycake, founded by first headmaster Alan Lake Chidsey in 1949, that originally produced and performed works written by Mr. Chidsey. Open to all Upper School students, Johnnycake provides opportunities in all aspects of theatrical production from technical crew to set and costume design to performance.

The SJS Visual Arts Department has hosted an annual Artist in Residence Program since 2017. Over the course of the program the artist works with Lower, Middle and Upper School art students to create a designated project. Patrick Reiner 2017, Journey Allen 2018, Tess Doyle 2020. The 2022 Artist was Michael Temple. The 2023 Artist was Guadalupe Hernandez. The 2024 Artist was Amy C. Evans. The 2025 Artist was Rahul Mitra.

=== Student organizations ===
The SJS Academic Bowl Team won the NAQT High School National Championship in 2002, placed third in 2003 and 2004, and advanced to the semi-finals of the PACE NSC in 2004. Most recently, St. John's placed 2nd in the 2014 HSNCT National Championships

Dozens of other student organizations, from the Yearbook to Model United Nations to "Pots and Pans" (a moral/spirit group), are active throughout the academic year. Other examples of clubs include sports based clubs (baseball, hockey, soccer, curling), science (Science and Math Club, Faraday), cinematography (MavTV), academic (Speech and Debate Team, Quiz Bowl/Academic Challenge, Mathematical Problem Solving Club), government (Junior Statesmen, Model UN, Young Political Organization), international interests (Spanish Club, Italian Club, International Club), and general interests (Bread Club, Auto club, Anime Club et al.).

=== Community service ===
Any student may submit a proposal to design and lead their own community service project and recruit other participants.

=== Nickname and mascot ===
The St. John's nickname and mascot have had a controversial history. The original nickname, "Crusaders," lasted only three years due to its religious connotations. "Rebels" was selected as the replacement nickname in 1949, with Confederate symbol Johnny Reb as the mascot.

In 1990, the Upper School students voted to discontinue the mascot and nickname. A year later, all symbols of the Confederacy were disassociated from the School, although the nickname "Rebels" was retained with the hopes it could be connected with the American Revolution or more generally as an invocation of nonconformity and independent thinking. There were plans to try to connect the rebel name with the film Rebel Without a Cause.

In the spring of 2004, by a unanimous vote of the board of trustees, St. John's School officially changed its nickname to Mavericks in order to further distance itself from any Confederate implications while still retaining the association with independence and individualism.

In 2008, St. John's began using a horse mascot known as Maverick in its pep rallies. In a school-wide pep rally, taking place the day before the annual Kinkaid football game, the Maverick chases a Falcon from the field.

== In the media and popular culture ==
=== News stories ===
National media reports about selective private schools in the United States have mentioned St. John's. For example, SJS was featured in a Forbes.com story titled "America's Elite Prep Schools." In November 2007, the Wall Street Journal listed St. John's in a chart accompanying an article titled "How to Get into Harvard." The chart reported that 9% of SJS graduates in 2007 went to one of eight elite colleges (specifically identified as Harvard, Princeton, MIT, Williams, Pomona, Swarthmore, the University of Chicago, and Johns Hopkins). St. John's and fellow SPC member St. Mark's School of Texas were the only Texas schools on the list.

Nationwide rankings of private high schools regularly include St. John's. Examples include:

- No. 5 - Best Private K-12 Schools in America, Niche.com (2024)
- No. 13 - Best Private High Schools in America, Niche.com (2024)
- No. 1 - Best Private High Schools in Texas, Niche.com (2024)
- No. 7 - The Smartest High Schools in the U.S., Business Insider (2016)

St. John's received media attention during the U.S. presidential campaign of 2000 as part of the press's reporting on the academic background of then-candidate George W. Bush when it was reported—and confirmed by Bush after he had consulted with his parents, former president George H. W. Bush and First Lady Barbara Bush—that he had applied to SJS as a child and had been rejected.

=== Rushmore ===
In 1998, Wes Anderson '87 directed the loosely autobiographical Rushmore, based on a screenplay co-written with Owen Wilson. In directing the film, Anderson based the fictitious Rushmore Academy on St. John's. As reported in The Atlantic, "When Wes Anderson scouted locations for the all-boys prep school..., he looked as far as the U.K. in search of the perfect location. It wasn't until he saw some photos of St. John's, his own high school, that he realized the places he had been imagining were the ones he knew from going to school there." Like protagonist Max Fischer, Anderson as a child had staged numerous epic action plays, with titles like The Five Maseratis and The Battle of the Alamo. Seen in Rushmore are the North Campus's Quadrangle and circle driveway, the Upper School library, and chapel service at the Church of St. John the Divine. Anderson also used a number of students and alumni as extras in the film. Additionally, the nickname for the fictitious Rushmore Academy was the Yankees, an ironic insider reference to the Rebels, the St. John's nickname when Anderson was a student.

=== Clinger ===
Much of the 2015 horror comedy Clinger, directed by Michael Steves, was filmed on the middle school campus at St. John's. Clinger premiered at the 2015 Slamdance Film Festival in Park City, Utah. It was announced during July that Clinger would premiere in theaters in October.

=== The Dropout ===
In the drama miniseries The Dropout, a young Elizabeth Holmes (Class of 2002) is portrayed as attending SJS as a Middle School student in 1995 and as an Upper School student in 2001.

=== Notable alumni ===
- Wes Anderson (1987), writer, film director.
- Kelsey Bing (2016), U.S. Olympic Team field hockey player
- William Curtis Bryson (1963), Jurist, Senior United States Circuit Judge of the United States Court of Appeals for the Federal Circuit
- Lauren Averett Byers (1994) physician-scientist. She is a Professor of Thoracic/Head and Neck Medical Oncology at The University of Texas MD Anderson Cancer Center.
- Katherine Center (1990), New York Times bestselling author
- Karl Deisseroth (1988), 2026 Nobel Prize in Medicine for his work in optogenetics. He is the D.H. Chen Foundation Professor of Bioengineering and a professor of psychiatry and behavioral sciences at Stanford University.
- William Stamps Farish III (1957), former U.S. Ambassador to the United Kingdom
- Lizzie Pannill Fletcher (1993), United States Representative (D-TX7)
- Christy Haubegger (1986), founder of Latina magazine and film producer
- Zachary Heinzerling (2002) is an American film director. He is best known for writing and directing the 2013 documentary film Cutie and the Boxer for which he won 'Best Director' at the 2013 Sundance Film Festival.
- Elizabeth Holmes (2002), founder of health technology company Theranos, convicted in 2022 of defrauding investors
- Sarah Blaffer Hrdy (1964), anthropologist, primatologist, and evolutionary biologist. She is Professor Emerita of Anthropology at the University of California, Davis, and a member of the National Academy of Sciences.
- Wesley Hunt (2000), United States Representative (R-TX38)
- Molly Ivins (1962), journalist and pundit (who described herself as feeling like a "Clydesdale among thoroughbreds" in comparing herself to her fellow students at SJS)
- Ken Keeler (1979), mathematician and television writer, Late Show with David Letterman, The Simpsons, and Futurama
- Katherine Y King (1992), physician-scientist, researcher, and professor specializing in pediatric infectious diseases
- Robert Adam Mosbacher Jr. (1969), American businessman, current Chairman of Mosbacher Energy, former head of the Overseas Private Investment Corporation (OPIC)
- Benjamin Moser (1994), 2020 Pulitzer Prize-winning author for his biography of Susan Sontag, titled Sontag: Her Life and Work.
- Laura Moser (1995), author and political activist
- Indy Neidell (1985), historian, host of The Great War
- Peter Roussel (1960), former deputy press secretary to U.S. president Ronald Reagan and media commentator
- Samuel Samson (2017), senior policy advisor, U.S. Department of State, and advisor to U.S. president Donald Trump on Europe
- Sidney Shlenker, businessman, president of the Houston Astros, and the owner of the Denver Nuggets.
- Lois Farfel Stark (1961) Emmy Award winning producer, documentary filmmaker, and author.
- Auden Thornton, actress
- Ashlee Vance (1996), business journalist, author
- Carl W. Vogt (1954), attorney, Chair of the National Transportation Safety Board, 15th President of Williams College.
- Emily Wang (1993), professor at Yale School of Medicine director of the SEICHE Center for Health and Justice, winner of the 2022 MacArthur Fellowship.
- Justise Winslow (2014), professional basketball player for the NBA's Portland Trail Blazers

== Heads of school ==
- Alan Lake Chidsey, 1946–1966
- Elwood Kimball Salls, 1966–1976
- Thomas Read, 1976–1981
- James R. Maggart, 1981–1991
- E. Philip Cannon, 1991–1998 (1991–1992 as interim headmaster)
- John Allman, 1998–2009 (followed by interim headmaster Jim Hendrix, 2009–2010)
- Mark Desjardins, 2010–2021
- Daniel J. Alig, 2021–present
