= Y-Titty =

German comedy trio

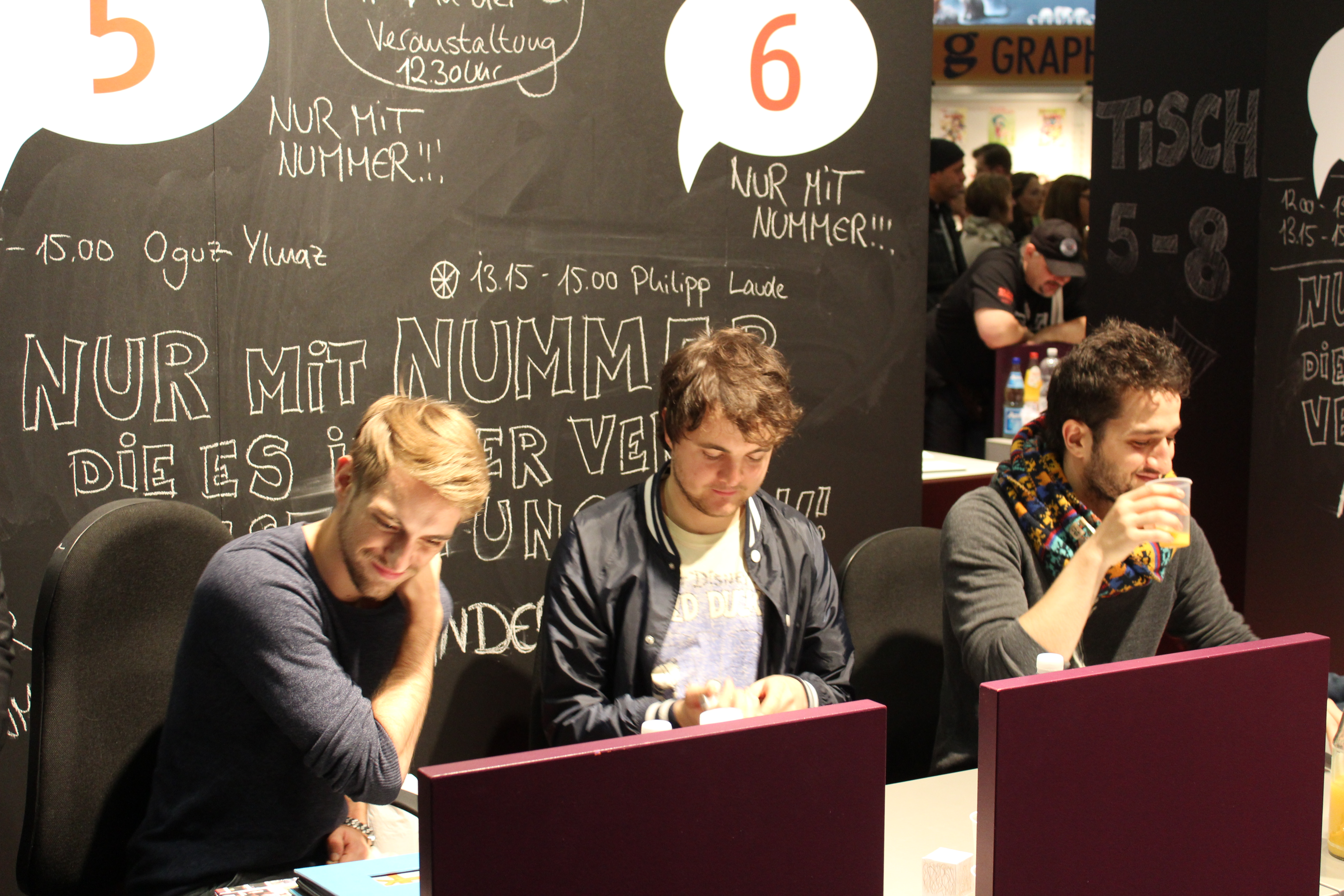
- Y-Titty at the Frankfurt Book Fair (2014)

YouTube information
- Channels: YTITTY; DieJungs
- Years active: 2006–2015
- Genres: Comedy, Music
- Subscribers: 3.06 million (main channel); 757 thousand (second channel)
- Views: 798 million (main channel); 160 million (second channel)
- Last updated: January 2025

Y-Titty [waɪˈtɪti] was a German comedy trio that was primarily active on the video portal YouTube. The group mainly produced sketches and parodies and was the most subscribed German-language YouTube channel with over 3.1 million subscribers and over 700 million video views by the beginning of June 2014. In 2014, the group won an Echo in the category "Best National Video". The trio worked in their projects as actors, musicians, presenters, video game commentators, producers, authors and designers.

On December 11, 2015, Laude, Roll and Yılmaz announced the dissolution of the trio and their withdrawal from the video platform YouTube with the humorous video #endlich as well as a separate serious video on their second channel diejungs.

== Name ==
The name Y-Titty is a corruption of the English acronym "Y. T. D.", which stands for "YouTube Dummies." YouTube Dummies was a previous project by Y-Titty, in which videos were made in the style of Jackass. Some of these videos can be seen on the YTITTYOldies channel.

The logo used is a combination of the letters Y and T, which resembles the letter Ұ from the Kazakh alphabet.

== Members ==
Y-Titty consisted of:

- Phil (initially Louder), real name Phillip Laude, (born 29 June 1990 in Kappeln)
- TC (initially Tizi), real name Matthias Roll, (born 25 August 1991 in Roth)
- OG, real name Oğuz Yılmaz, (born 17 April 1991 in Neumarkt in der Oberpfalz)

== Production ==
While the videos were initially shot as a leisure activity in the Hilpoltstein area, the clips were later produced by Cologne-based Mediakraft Networks GmbH. Other members of the Mediakraft network were therefore also seen in the three's videos as part of cross-promotions. Y-Titty had been a YouTube partner since 2009, which meant they earned money through advertising that was shown before the actual videos were played.

Communication with fans took place via social networks such as Facebook and Twitter as well as the comments under the videos that were answered in commentary shows, which they called "KomKomShow".

== Style ==
Y-Titty mainly produced song parodies, short clips, trailers for alleged film adaptations of iPhone apps, real-life computer games (GTA, Skyrim and Call of Duty) and videos about apparently new Apple products. Their second channel (DieJungs) also featured the formats Die Jungs labern and Die Jungs unterwegs, in which they provide a glimpse behind the scenes or what happens on their travels to different places, as well as Die Jungs kommentieren, in which the trio referred to the comments posted under the videos on the second channel. In addition, making-ofs and so-called one-takers (video clips without cuts) in which they provide information about current projects or the like were uploaded. Another format since May 2014 has been the WikiBattle. Here, well-known YouTubers competed against each other in a tournament. The task was to start from a given Wikipedia article and reach another given Wikipedia article as quickly as possible via Wiki links.

Y-Titty's own compositions are all pop music with elements of hip hop. Most of the parodied songs also come from these two genres.

== History ==
=== 2006–2011: Founding ===
Y-Titty was founded in 2006 by Phil and TC. They joined YouTube on February 25, 2008. At first, videos were only published sporadically until the television station Premiere became aware of the Hilpoltstein duo and shot a pilot film with them. In September 2009, Oğuz Yılmaz joined the group and acts as a cameraman in many videos.

The trio had its breakthrough with parodies of Eminem and Rihanna's "Love the Way You Lie" and the novel adaptations of Twilight and became known to a wider public.

On June 22, 2010, the channel reached the 100,000 subscriber mark. The channel DieJungs was also founded on December 17, 2010, on which they published web shows, vlogs and behind-the-scenes videos. In 2010, Phil, TC and OG were awarded the "KIKA LIVE Web Award". In 2010, Y-Titty took part in the recording of the music video SMS-Song by the music group Die Original Elbtaler Spitzbärte, which was released on iTunes and Amazon.

=== 2011: First single ===
In autumn 2011, Y-Titty announced a rule. They introduced FreeTittyDay, where a new sketch was uploaded every Friday. They also launched the KomKomShow (comment-comment show). This was first uploaded after the parody of Gotye's "Somebody That I Used to Know" and then posted every Wednesday, in which the YouTubers reacted to comments on the respective sketch.

Also in autumn 2011, the trio released its first single Ständertime. With their motto "We want to revolutionize German comedy!" they called on people to download the song from various download portals and thereby increase the chance of a single chart placement. The following week, the song reached number 48 in the German charts.

Since about 2011, the group has been able to live off of income from YouTube.

=== 2012: The Ponk Network and two more singles ===
On February 7, 2012, the comedy trio was a guest on the Harald Schmidt Show, where they announced that they had recorded around 10,000,000 video views in the previous month alone.

Y-Titty founded the Ponk network in late summer 2012. In addition to Y-Titty himself, many other comedy channels are involved, such as "ApeCrime", "FuNPeXeL" and "BullshitTV". Comedy videos were published on the channel five times a week. The Ponk shared apartment was also founded, but Phil, TC and OG did not move into it.

On August 3, 2012, Y-Titty released his second single, Der letzte Sommer They were able to top the chart success of Ständertime and entered the German charts at number 15. In Austria they reached number 19 and in Switzerland number 34. On September 5, 2012, the trio was given a one-off show on RTL II.

On September 25, 2012, Y-Titty published the NICHT-book, which it had already advertised and posted a video about the creation of the book on DieJungs. In the book, Y-Titty makes fun of "haters" and tells the story of the fourth Y-Titty.

On November 30, 2012, the third single, Fest der Liebe, was released and entered the German charts at number 27. On December 31, 2012, Y-Titty became the first German-language channel with its own content to reach one million subscribers. They reached 1.5 million subscribers on March 29, 2013.

=== 2013: Debut album and Y-Play ===
In spring 2013, Y-Titty was nominated for the Echo in the category "National Best Music Video" with Der letzte Sommer, but they did not win. On December 30, 2012, Y-Titty overtook the most subscribed YouTube channel at the time, "DieAussenseiter," and one day later they surpassed the 1 million subscriber mark. On July 15, 2013, Y-Titty surpassed the two million subscriber mark on YouTube.

On July 3, 2013, the Y-Play channel was created. It was not Y-Titty's own account, but was used by various comedy groups, such as ApeCrime, the Ponk members, or Y-Titty themselves. It was a channel where they uploaded Let's Play videos. A new video appeared every day with a specific theme such as "Versus Play," "Retro Play," or "Community Play."

On May 12, 2013, the trio announced that they were planning an album. The songs and the album were produced by German producer TheEmu. On July 26, 2013, the release of a new single was announced on Facebook. It is called Halt dein Maul and was released on August 9, 2013. Y-Titty set the goal of getting into the top 10 of the German single charts with this song. This goal was achieved, the song even entered the single charts at number 5. They also reached the top 10 in Austria and Switzerland. The album Stricksocken Swagger was released on August 23, 2013 and is the group's first number one hit.

On October 12, 2013, OG and TC took part in Stefan Raab's Stock Car Crash Challenge. Y-Titty was already a guest on TV total on 13 March 2013.

=== 2014: Takeover Battle, Stricksockenswagger Tour and the Echo 2014 ===
In January 2014, Y-Titty made its three channels Y-Titty, diejungs and Y-Play available to lesser-known YouTubers for a week each as part of the so-called Y-Titty Takeover Battle (YTB). BullshitTV, Digges Ding, Cinemates and SpaceBoyz were selected. The first three channels were chosen by the trio, SpaceBoyz won a preliminary round in which all viewers were allowed to submit a video. BullshitTV received the audience award, while the jury chose Digges Ding as the best channel.

On January 31, 2014, the song #Hashtag with rapper MC Fitti was released. However, #Hashtag only reached number 50 in the German charts.

From mid-February to mid-March 2014, the comedy trio held its first major tour with their debut album Stricksocken Swagger through Germany, Austria and Switzerland. Y-Titty performed in Cologne, Frankfurt, Hanover, Dresden, Berlin, Hamburg (1st round), Vienna, Graz, Zurich, Stuttgart, Munich and Nuremberg (2nd round). They later said they wanted to do another tour.

On March 27, the three comedians won the Echo 2014, which was awarded via internet voting, in the category Best National Video for the song Halt dein Maul. Phil, OG and music producer TheEmu were there to accept the award. TC was in Miami at the time.

On June 5, 2014, Let's Player Gronkh overtook Y-Titty in terms of subscriber count. This was the first time since the end of 2012 that they were no longer the most subscribed YouTube channel in Germany.

On June 20, 2014, Y-Titty announced in a video that they would be taking a break from uploading any videos to their main channel. They also explained that they would only post videos when they felt like it. They also wanted to start working on a feature film.

On August 8, 2014, the trio's sixth single, entitled Verdammt Normal, was released.

On August 25, 2014, TC started his own channel where he publishes videos from his private life.

On September 11, 2014, Oğuz announced that there would be no more new videos on Y-Play, but that the channel would still be available.

On September 22, 2014, the channel reached the three million subscriber mark.

On October 9, 2014, Oğuz posted the first video on his own channel. Since January 2014, he has also been running another channel together with his fiancée. The videos of both channels are now set to private.

=== 2015: Dissolution ===
On December 11, 2015, the trio posted a music video entitled "#endlich" on the main channel, in which they sang humorously about the end of the channel. The serious counterpart can be found on the second channel, diejungs, in which Y-Titty explains the ending and gives an outlook on the future. Laude wants to devote more time to his acting career, Roll wants to continue with YouTube, and Yılmaz wants to devote more time to activities behind the camera. Roll wants to build a completely new, independent channel.

== Controversy ==
On March 25, 2014, the ARD series Report Mainz accused the trio of product placement and editorially integrated advertising for brands such as Samsung, Coca-Cola and McDonald's without adequate labeling. The responsible district government of Mittelfranken then examined whether it was responsible for investigating the allegations, but did not initiate any formal investigation into surreptitious advertising. Mediakraft, the channel's marketer at the time, rejected the allegations of covert advertising. After that, all videos containing Y-Titty advertising content were given a "Supported by product placement" overlay.

== Discography ==
=== Albums ===
- 2013: Sticksocken Swagger

=== Singles ===
- 2010: Twilight (Theemu feat. Y_titty)
- 2011: Ständertime
- 2012: Der letzte Sommer
- 2012: Fest der Liebe
- 2013: Halt dein Maul
- 2013: Ich zock lieber
- 2014: #Hashtag
- 2014: Verdammt normal
- 2014: Manuel Neuer
- 2015: #endlich

== Filmography ==
- 2015: Kartoffelsalat – Nicht fragen!
- 2015: Alles steht Kopf (Matthias Roll und Phil Laude als Sprecher)
- 2016: Bibi &amp; Tina: Mädchen gegen Jungs (Phil Laude)
- 2017: Bibi &amp; Tina: Tohuwabohu Total (Matthias Roll)
- 2020: Kartoffelsalat 3 – Das Musical (Matthias Roll und Phil Laude)

== Works ==
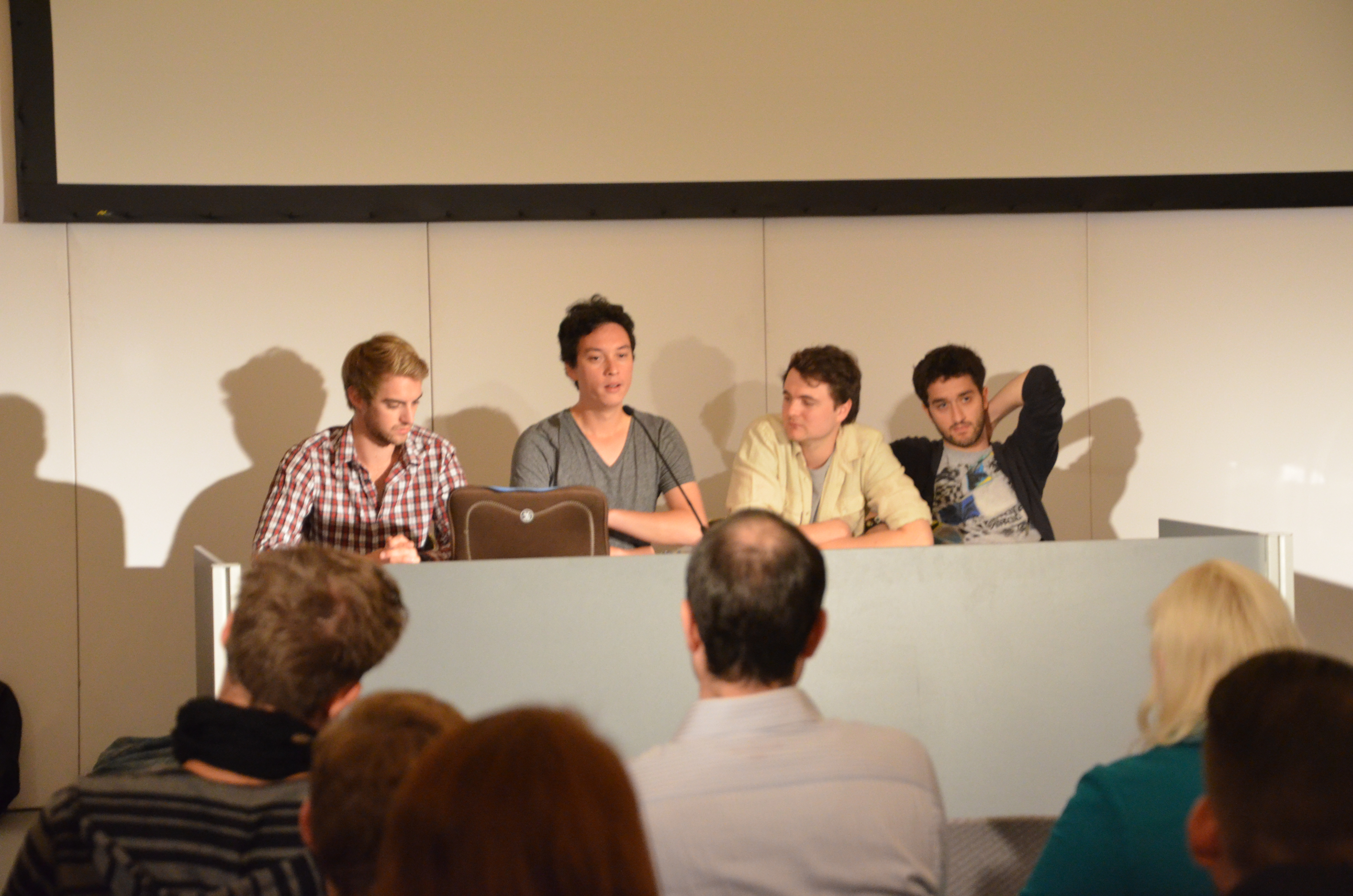
Y-Titty together with music producer Emanuel Uch (second from left) at a lecture in Cologne (2013)

- NICHT-Buch. Carlsen, Hamburg 2012, ISBN 978-3-551-68422-6.
- Das Buch YOLO. Carlsen, Hamburg 2013, ISBN 978-3-551-68427-1.

== Awards ==
Year	Award
2009	3rd place in the Camgaroo Awards with "Besom – Der Besen"
2010	1st place: KIKA LIVE Web Award
2010	3rd place: Mittelfränkisches Jugendfilmfestival ("Besom – Der Besen")
2010	1st place: Magix Video Contest ("Besom – Der Besen")
2012	Golden Bravo Otto 2011 in the category "Internet-Star"
2012	Deutschen Webvideopreis 2012 with Gronkh in the categories "EPIC" and "Let's Play" (both audience awards)
2013	Nominated for the ECHO with „Der letzte Sommer" (best national video)
2013	Golden Bravo Otto 2012 in the category „Internet-Star"
2013	Honorary Award of the European Web Video Academy for the Deutschen Webvideopreis 2013
2013	Golden PlayAward, an award for the most successful YouTube channels from around the world
2014	ECHO in the category "Best Video" for "Halt dein Maul" (together with Jonas Ressel)
2016	Entry into the EWVA Hall of Fame at the German Web Video Award 2016 for Lifetime Achievement
