= NRB =

NRB is an initialism or code that may refer to:

- National Reconstruction Bureau, Pakistani government institution for economic recovery and prosperity
- National Religious Broadcasters, international association of Christian communicators
- Nederlandse Rugby Bond, Dutch rugby union governing body
- Needle Roller Bearing, a type of Rolling Bearing
- Nepal Rastra Bank, central bank of Nepal
- New Research Building, Harvard University biomedical research facility
- Nil-rate band, which establishes the amount someone can inherit without paying inheritance tax in the United Kingdom
- Non-rebreather mask, device used for emergency oxygen therapy
- Norbury railway station, England (station code NRB)
- Nuclear Recycle Board, part of Bhabha Atomic Research Centre in India
- People's Republic of Bulgaria (Bulgarian: Народна република България, Narodna Republika Balgariya)
