= Freshtorge =

German comedian and video producer

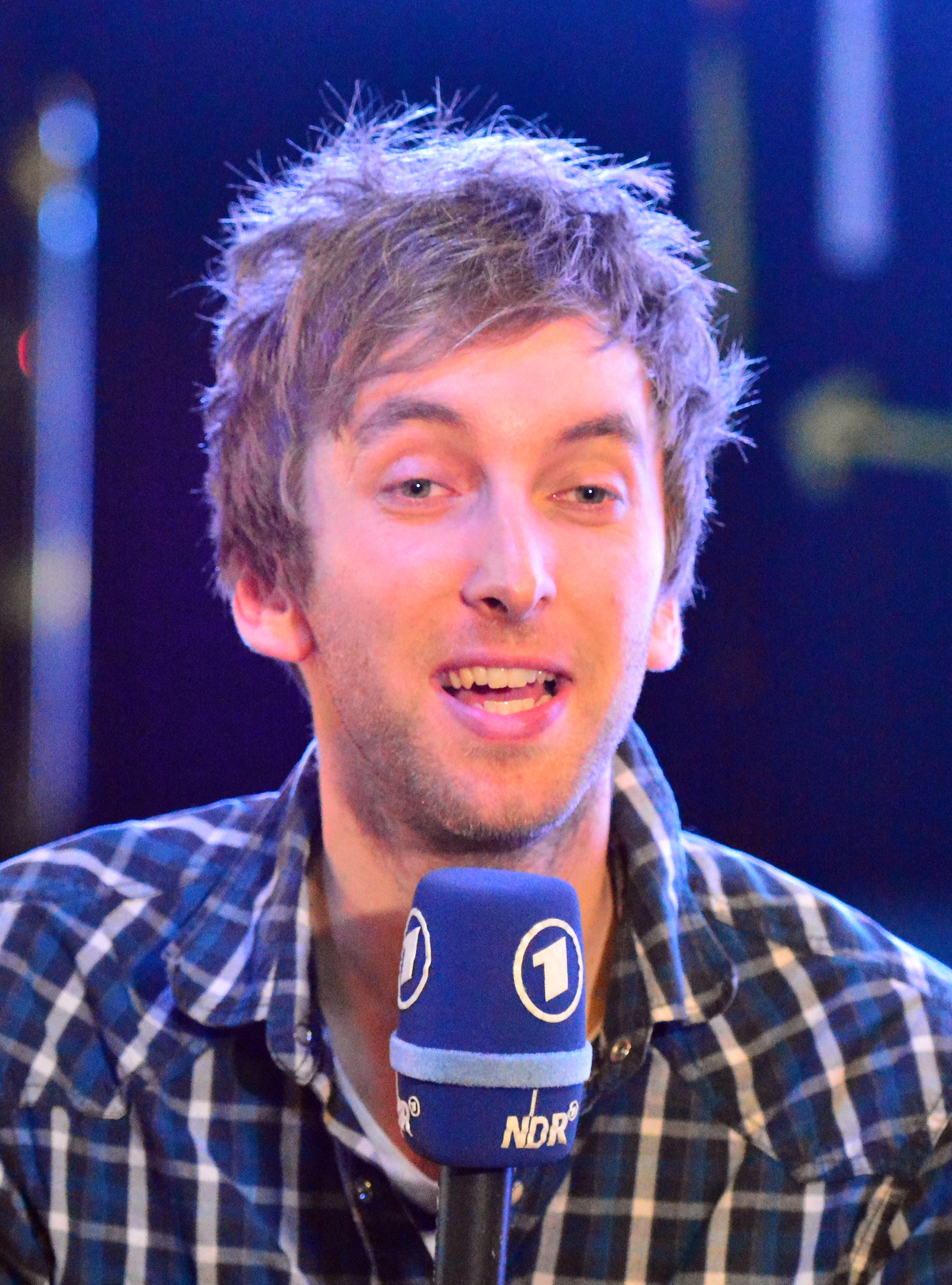
- Oelrich in 2015
- Born: September 11, 1988 (age 37); Heide, West-Germany

YouTube information
- Channel: Freshtorge
- Years active: 2009–present
- Genre: comedy
- Subscribers: 3.7 million
- Last updated: August 20, 2023
- Website: freshtorge.tv

Torge Oelrich (born September 11, 1988), better known as Freshtorge, is a German comedian, actor and video producer.

== Life ==
After completing Realschule in 2008, Oelrich completed an apprenticeship as an educator in Heide. At the same time, he started his activity as a video producer.

He is best known for his YouTube channel Freshtorge where he embodies various characters.

On May 10, 2013, he released the single Superstar which he performed as his character Sandra. The single was released in order to prevent Beatrice Egli from taking first place in the show Deutschland sucht den Superstar. It reached number 10 in the download trend charts on May 13, 2013.

In July 2015, he released his first own film Kartoffelsalat – Nicht fragen!. The film received consistently negative reviews.

Oelrich is also known for his cooperation with Otto Waalkes and appeared in his shows Otto – Geboren um zu blödeln and Otto Fröhliche – Advent, Advents mit Otto und Friends.

In 2023, he was given his first own show Einsame Herzen on ZDFneo and ZDFmediathek.

== Filmography ==
- 2014: Gefällt mir (de)
- 2015: Kartoffelsalat – Nicht fragen! (leading actor and scriptwriter)
- 2015: Bruder vor Luder (de)
- 2015: Look Who's Back (cameo)
- 2016: Ice Age: Collision Course (German voice of Roger) (de)
- 2017: Neues aus Büttenwarder – episode Unter Dampf
- 2018: Heilstätten
- 2020: Kartoffelsalat 3 – Das Musical (de)

== Discography ==
=== own songs ===
- 2013: Superstar
- 2016: Pussy Gangster
- 2016: Der Bratwurst Hit
- 2018: Milch ist Gift
- 2018: Ich hab meine Tage
- 2018: "Mathe ist ein Arsch für mich"
- 2019: Für Dich!
- 2020: Total Eclipse of the Heart
- 2021: Mareike-Pferdemädchen
- 2021: Kann ich nicht
- 2022: Olaf Scholz Song
- 2022: Typen aus der Stadt
- 2023: Durchfall auf Barbados

=== song parodies ===
- 2010: Palamazzi (cover of Paparazzi by Lady Gaga)
- 2011: Der Sascha Song (cover of The Flood by Take That)
- 2011: Franzi Song (cover of Rhythm Divine by Enrique Iglesias)
- 2012: Sandra Song (Ich bin die Geilste) (cover of Freedom by DJ Bobo)
- 2012: Sweetheart-Song about Sandra (cover of Ho Hey by The Lumineers)
- 2014: Sandra Bla Bla Bla Song (cover of Que Sera by Justice Crew)
- 2015: Ich will Schnee (cover of Let It Go from the film Frozen)
- 2017: Exclusiv: Stellungnahme von Bibi !!! How it is (wap bap) (parody of Bibi H.'s song How It Is (Wap Bap ...))
- 2017: FT Freak – YouTuber Disstrack (parody of the YouTuber diss track by KsFreak)
- 2018: Mathe ist ein Arsch (parody of It's a Hard Knock Life by Annie)
- 2019: Ich hab den Test verkackt (parody of Star by Reamonn)
- 2020: Die Zerstörung von 2020 (parody of Do You Wanna Party by Reversus)

== Awards and nominations ==
Year	Award	Nomination	Result	Ref.
2016	Nickelodeon Kids' Choice Awards	Favorite YouTuber (Germany, Austria, Switzerland)	Nominated	
2017	Goldene Kamera Digital Awards	Comedy	Won	
2018	Nickelodeon Kids' Choice Awards	Favorite Big Kid (Germany, Austria, Switzerland)	Nominated	
2020	Nickelodeon Kids' Choice Awards	Favorite Social Media Star (Germany, Austria, Switzerland)	Nominated	
2020	Nickelodeon Kids' Choice Awards	Favorite Big Kid (Germany, Austria, Switzerland)	Nominated	
