= Indy Neidell =

American actor, documentarian, and YouTuber

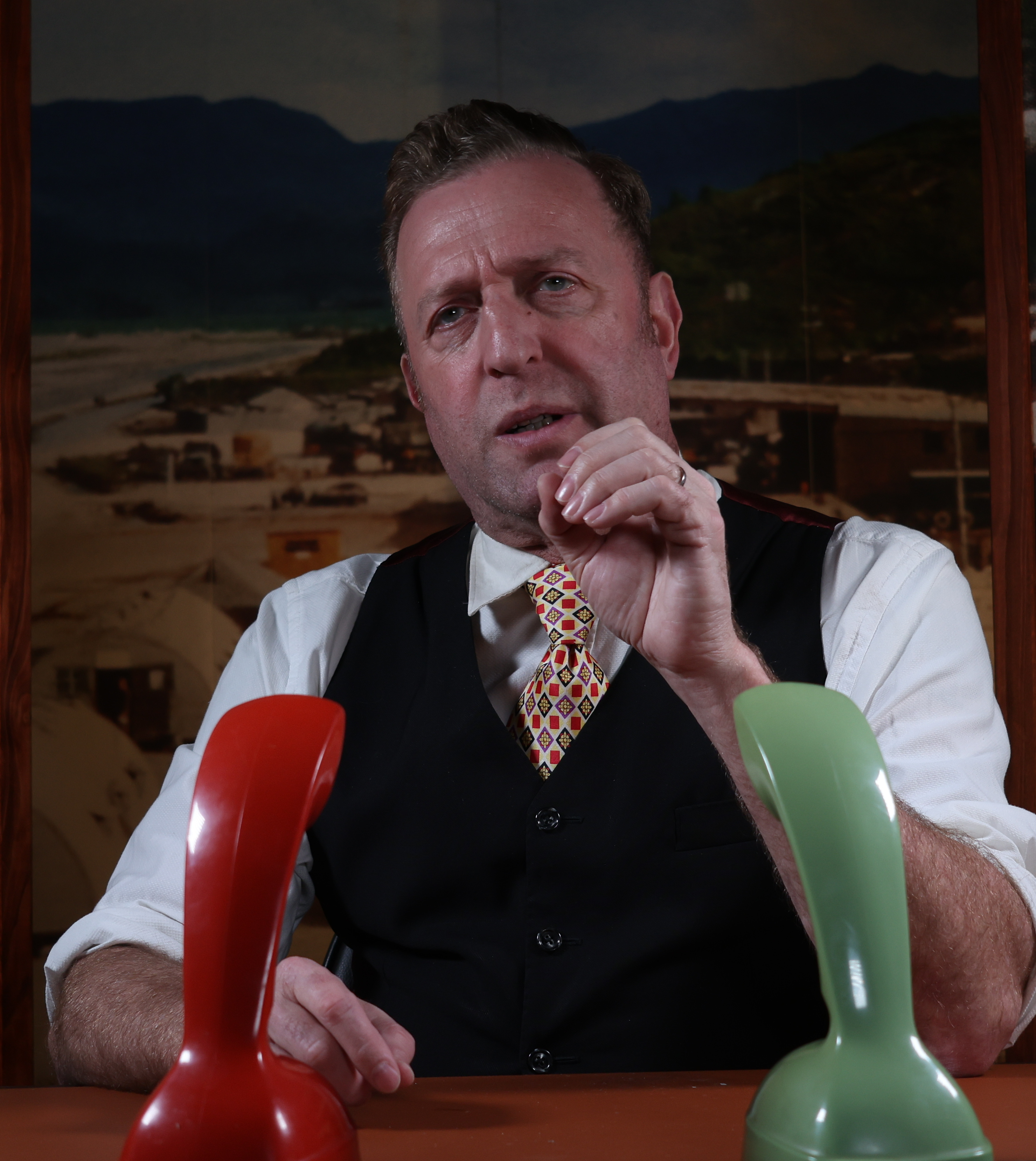
- Neidell in 2025
- Born: September 28, 1967 (age 59); Pennsylvania, U.S.
- Education: Wesleyan University
- Occupations: Actor; documentarian; writer; YouTube personality

Indiana Richard Alexander Neidell (born September 28, 1967) is an American-Swedish documentarian, historian, actor, voice actor, musician and YouTube personality, best known for presenting the video series The Great War on The Great War Channel, which documented World War I in real time using modern research, various secondary sources and archival footage. A similar project, World War Two (about World War II), began in September 2018; and another one, called The Korean War, began in June 2024. Neidell is also a writer and actor with credits that include Metropia and numerous commercials in Europe, as well as video game voice-acting.

== Early life and education ==
Neidell was born in Pennsylvania to Norman Neidell and Joy Neidell (née Reay). His family moved to Houston when he was nine months old. Neidell attended St. John's School, graduating in 1985. He studied history at Wesleyan University for four years. As a teenager, he worked at a grocery store.

During an episode of World War Two, Neidell stated that his mother, Joy, was born in Egypt in 1940 to his grandfather Basil. Basil was originally from the United Kingdom and eventually moved to Egypt working for the Egyptian Ministry of Education. He later became the Superintendent of schools for the British Dominion of Egypt. During World War II he joined the Royal Air Force. At some point after the war, he became the Secretary of the International Lawn Tennis Federation.

== Career ==
=== Early career ===
During 2021, the TimeGhost History YouTube channel revealed information about Neidell's career prior to hosting Watch Sunday Baseball through posts in the Community section. He met Spartacus Olsson around the year 2000 at a bar on the island of Mallorca and they worked together on several media projects. In addition, Neidell played with Swedish musician Moneybrother for several years.

=== Mediakraft and The Great War series ===
Neidell was approached by Mediakraft, the producers of The Great War, to host the series after they saw a series of videos he had produced between May and September 2013 about the history of baseball, entitled Watch Sunday Baseball. The Great War spin-off YouTube channel "It's History" also featured Neidell as a guest host for episodes on famous military campaigns.

The Great War project officially ended on 11 November 2018, exactly 100 years after the signing of the Armistice at Compiègne which formally ended all hostilities in the First World War. Neidell stated in his finale video that the channel will continue to release some episodes about events following the First World War. As for himself, Neidell has moved on to focus on other projects, such as the aforementioned World War II series.

==== TimeGhost History ====
Neidell would launch the TimeGhost History YouTube channel in June 2017 with Spartacus Olsson, the creator of The Great War and the producer of it for its first two years. The first feature was day-by-day coverage of the Cuban Missile Crisis, 55 years to the day after the event. The group returned to cover the event in more detail beginning in June 2020 in their The Cuban Missile Crisis Day by Day series. In April 2018, they launched the "Between 2 Wars" series to recap the Interwar period. During September 2020, TimeGhost announced in a YouTube video on their channel that a second season of Between 2 Wars would be launched; named "Zeitgeist" with the first episode being released in October 2020.

=== World War Two ===
With The Great War project coming to a close in November 2018, Indy Neidell and Spartacus Olsson prepared for an equivalent YouTube project focusing on World War II, which they would produce themselves through their own TimeGhost channel (unlike The Great War) with a projected start date for September 1, 2018. Accounting for the war's longer duration and larger scope for this independent project without the participation of Mediakraft Networks, it is a collaboration of various channels: TimeGhost will focus on a weekly series on the general historical events of the war in the European and Pacific Theatres of the war. To raise the money need for the project, a successful Kickstarter campaign was launched which raised $63,816 (€54,380). With those funds available, a new studio was built from the ground up in its own building and arrangements were made with media providers such as Reuters News Service for archival footage.

The series also has an Instagram account which runs parallel to it and follows the events of World War II on a day-by-day basis. The series also has a X account which follows the events of the World War II, with discussions on relevant parallels drawn between World War II and the present as well as myth-busting common misconceptions. As of September 2026, the YouTube channel has received more than 390 million views, 1.18 million subscribers and 1,338 videos uploaded.

The World War Two project officially ended on September 2, 2024, exactly 79 years after the signing of the Japanese Instrument of Surrender which ended World War II. Since then, the channel has continued to upload new content focusing in detail on events surrounding the second World War including the Rise of Hitler, the death of democracy, and specific battles, campaigns, and equipment.

=== Sabaton ===
In February 2019, Neidell teamed up with Swedish heavy metal band Sabaton for a project called Sabaton History, for which he is the host and writer. The series documents the historical events surrounding the band's songs. He also portrayed T. E. Lawrence in the music video for Sabaton's song "Seven Pillars of Wisdom" and Adrian Carton de Wiart in the music video for their song "The Unkillable Soldier".

=== The Korean War ===
On June 25, 2024, Neidell launched the third real-time series, this time covering the Korean War. Similar to their previous real-time series, the channel provides week by week coverage of the events of the Korean War. As of September 2026, the YouTube channel has received more than 33 million views and 156 thousand subscribers.

== Personal life ==
Neidell left the United States in January 1993, living in New York City prior to moving to Europe. He lived in Prague for several years before leaving the city. After leaving Prague, Indy spent time living in Budapest, Istanbul, London and Edinburgh before eventually moving to Stockholm in 1996, where he has lived since. He has dual citizenship of the United States and Sweden. Neidell is a member of the European chapter of the Society for American Baseball Research and a supporter of the Houston Astros.
