= Chidsey =

Chidsey is a surname. Notable people with the surname include:

- Alan Lake Chidsey (1904–1981), American secondary educator
- Donald Barr Chidsey (1902–1981), American writer, biographer, historian, and novelist
- John Chidsey (born 1962), American businessman and attorney
