= Christy Haubegger =

American journalist

- Born: August 15, 1968 (age 58); Houston, Texas
- Education: University of Texas 1989), Stanford Law School
- Occupations: Business executive, writer, film producer
- Known for: Founding editor, Latina magazine; Executive, WarnerMedia
- Parent(s): David and Ann Haubegger (Adopted)

Christy Haubegger (born August 15, 1968) is the founder of Latina magazine and was formerly the Executive Vice President, Chief Enterprise Inclusion Officer and Head of Marketing & Communications, at WarnerMedia.

== Early life ==
She was born in Houston, Texas, to a Mexican-American woman and was then adopted by an Anglo couple, David and Ann Haubegger. Haubegger was raised in Bellaire, an exceptionally wealthy suburb of Houston. Although her parents did not speak Spanish, they strongly encouraged her to learn the language and to explore Mexican culture, and Haubegger was enrolled in a bilingual preschool, continuing to learn Spanish in primary and secondary schools.

She graduated from St. John's School (Texas) in 1986 and then went to college at the University of Texas at Austin. After she received her Bachelor of Arts degree in philosophy in 1989, Haubegger attended Stanford Law School where she was class president and served as a senior editor of the Stanford Law Review. Haubegger graduated with a juris doctor degree in 1992.

== Career ==
Frustrated by a lack of Hispanic role models in the popular media, the then 28-year-old Stanford Law School graduate founded Latina in 1996 to appeal to Hispanic-American women like herself. The magazine has reached 250,000 in circulation, was recognized two years in a row on Adweek's "Hot List," and counts some of the world's largest marketers among its advertisers. Haubegger remains a member of the Board for Latina Media Ventures, Latina's parent company.

Haubegger has received numerous accolades and recognition for her pioneering work in marketing and media. She has been recognized as one of Advertising Age's "Women to Watch" and was inducted into the American Advertising Federation Hall of Achievement for her work in raising the awareness and understanding of the U.S. Hispanic market.

In January 2001, Newsweek named her one of the "Women of the New Century." She has been interviewed and profiled by a number of major media outlets including the Today Show, NBC Nightly News with Tom Brokaw, The New York Times, CNN, and others.

In 2002, she brought her media and marketing expertise to the big screen, having served as associate producer on 20th Century Fox's Chasing Papi and an executive producer of Columbia Pictures' Spanglish.

In 2005, Haubegger joined Creative Artists Agency, where she led the company's drive to increase the representation of women and people of color, Under Haubegger's leadership, CAA launched CAA Amplify, an invitation-only annual event convening high-level multicultural artists and leaders, as well as the Amplify Database, the industry's first searchable database of television writers of color.

Haubegger joined WarnerMedia in August 2019 and the organization's Chief Enterprise Inclusion Officer. In 2020, she also became the company's Head of Marketing & Communications.

Haubegger serves on the boards of Management Leadership for Tomorrow, a non-profit organization that works to increase the number of minority business leaders, as well as Hudson Pacific Properties. Haubegger is also a founding member of TIME’S UP, an initiative that addresses systemic inequality and injustice in the workplace.

On April 6, 2022, it was announced that Haubegger would be stepping down from her role in face of the soon-to-be-completed merger of WarnerMedia and Discovery, Inc.
