= Katherine Y. King =

Doctor and Researcher

- Born: 1974 (age 51–52); Houston, Texas
- Occupations: Doctor and Medical Researcher

Katherine Yudeh King (born 1974) is a professor of Pediatric Infectious Diseases, Associate Vice-chair of Pediatrics Research and Co-director Medical Scientist Training Program at Baylor College of Medicine.

== Biography ==
King was born in 1974, in Houston, Texas.

King attended St. John's School in Houston (Class of 1982). She earned her A.B. in Biochemical Sciences from Harvard University and the attended Washington University in St Louis where she earned her M.D. and Ph.D. in Molecular Microbiology and Microbial Pathogenesis. King then completed her residency at Baylor College of Medicine, where she also did a fellowship in Pediatric Infectious Diseases.

As a physician scientist, King specializes in infectious diseases diagnosis and treatment in children. Her extramurally funded research program investigates the impact of infection and inflammation on bone marrow function, including hematopoietic stem cells.

== Honors, awards, and publications ==
King has won the Presidential Early Career Award for Scientists and Engineers (PECASE), the Emerging Investigator Award from the National Institute of Health, and the E. Mead Johnson Award from the Society of Pediatric Research. She has written or co-authored over 80 articles published in scientific journals, such as the Journal of Clinical Investigation, Trends in Molecular Medicine, Protein Science, and Journal of Bacteriology.
