= The Great War (YouTube channel) =

History YouTube channel and web series

- The Great War YouTube Logo
- Other name: RealTimeHistory

YouTube information
- Channel: TheGreatWar
- Years active: 2014–present
- Genre: History
- Subscribers: 1.88 million
- Website: RealTimeHistory

The Great War is a history YouTube channel and web series which covered the events of World War I week-by-week from July 1914 to November 1918, now focusing on the events that followed it in longer episodes. The Great War is operated and owned by Real Time History. The series debuted on July 28, 2014. It is currently hosted and written by Jesse Alexander, a Canadian historian. It has been previously hosted by American historian and actor Indy Neidell. The channel produced weekly content that follows the events that occurred one hundred years prior during the war.

After the centennial's conclusion, Indy Neidell, the first host and writer of the series, left the project to present a new channel focussing on the Second World War. As of 2024 Neidell currently presents a third channel focussing on the Korean War. Jesse Alexander was picked to replace Neidell. It currently focuses the First World War's aftermath, abandoning the week-by-week format and focusing on longer, more in-depth documentaries about events that followed it, such as the German Revolution and the Russian Civil War.

== Premise ==
The Great War channel produces a number of different types of content, the main feature being a weekly recap of the war that corresponds to the events of the same week 100 years prior. The events presented are also summarized quarterly in their own videos.

The channel also presents other segments such as:

- "Out of the Trenches" - an informative segment in which the host answers questions asked by subscribers on a wide range of topics.
- "Who Did What in World War I?" - a biographical segment that focuses on the actions of famous individuals during the First World War.
- "Countries in World War I" - A segment that gives a summary of the situation of individual countries just before and during the war.
- Technology and Warfare in World War I - Experts inspect and discuss weapons and tools from the war.
- World War I Essential Knowledge - A segment which is designed to provide background information on the war, such as tactics and politics.
- Visits to significant European sites of the war, including Verdun and Przemyśl fortress.

From 2019/1919, Out of the Trenches was renamed Beyond the Great War. Although it is only one episode per month, it is longer than the old 10 minutes Out of the Trenches.

== History ==
Indiana Neidell and the producers of the channel tried a number of different show formats with only The Great War surviving. Mediakraft Networks, the production company of The Great War, originally planned to launch as well German, Polish and Turkish language versions of the show. However, unlike the English channel, these ambiguous projects did not prove to have a chance to recoup their costs. This quickly led to the termination of the Polish channel. On August 17, 2015, the German series ended its run after a total of 102 episodes. The English channel continued substantially due to support by crowdfunding.

The show got a big boost in viewership when the Battlefield 1 first-person shooter video game developed by EA DICE and published by Electronic Arts was released worldwide for Microsoft Windows, PlayStation 4, and Xbox One on October 21, 2016. Neidell, with research assistant Markus Linke, also contributed research and wrote in-game codex entries for Battlefield 1 and named the "medals" that serve as the game's achievement trophies.

The channel has been in operation since May 2014. It continued to produce its regular content, involving the war's centennial, until December 2018. In early 2019, the channel started to produce longer in-depth episodes under a new host, Jesse Alexander, who replaced Neidell as he moved on to other projects such as World War Two. As of March 2019, the channel has posted more than 650 videos.

== Reception ==
The web series has been well received by digital media.
