= Kartoffelsalat – Nicht fragen! =

- Directed by: Michael David Pate
- Written by: Torge Oelrich
- Starring: Torge Oelrich; Otto Waalkes
- Music by: Otto Waalkes
- Release date: 23 July 2015
- Running time: 81 minutes
- Country: Germany
- Language: German

Kartoffelsalat – Nicht fragen! (lit. "Potato Salad – Don't ask!") is a 2015 German low-budget horror comedy film. Directed by Michael David Pate (de), it unites an ensemble cast of German YouTube personalities and actors with a strong record of comedic roles like Otto Waalkes, who also serves as co-producer and composer of the musical score.

Described as a spoof of the Fack ju Göhte franchise and similar high school teen films, Kartoffelsalat received generally negative reviews.

== Synopsis ==
Having been a victim of bullying, life at his new school does not take a turn to the better for Leo Weiß (played by Torge Oelrich). In order to no longer be the misfit and to exercise power over his fellow students, he secretly infects them with a zombie virus. As he is the only one who knows that a training in dancing, handicrafts or mathematics can transform them back to normal, Leo soon becomes the school's highly acclaimed hero.

== Cast ==
Kartoffelsalat features a number of German YouTube personalities and webvideo producers, for most of whom this marks their first appearance in a feature-length film:

- Torge Oelrich (de), known for his YouTube comedy sketches and parodies under the pseudonym Freshtorge. Leading actor and skript writer.
- Joyce Ilg (de), professional actress with strong YouTube activities.
- Dagi Bee (de) (Dagmara Ochmanczyk), broadcaster of styling and fashion tips on YouTube.
- Bianca Heinicke (de), of fashion and lifestyle themed YouTube channel ("BibisBeautyPalace").
- Simon Desue (de), YouTube comedian ("Halfcast Germany").
- Philipp Laude, Matthias Roll and Oğuz Yılmaz, who make up the YouTube comedy group Y-Titty (de).
- Viktor Roth (de), who produces videogame-themed webvideos under the YouTube pseudonym "iBlali."
- Die Lochis (de), known for their song parodies.

The cast is completed by long-standing German (comedy) actors like Otto Waalkes, Tobias Schenke, Martin Schneider and Katy Karrenbauer.

== Production details ==
The film's title "Kartoffelsalat" (German for potato salad) does not have any connection to the plot, which is why the subheading "nicht fragen" (don't ask) was added. It was mainly filmed on location at the secondary school in Wesselburen that was once attended by Torge Oelrich.

The film was heavily promoted on YouTube by its participants. It premiered on 23 July 2015 in 500 cinemas in Germany, Austria, Switzerland and Luxembourg. On its first weekend, Kartoffelsalat was watched by 119,000 people, which made it the fifth-most viewed movie performance in Germany and helped to already bring in the production cost.

== Reception ==
According to Michael Pate, the director, the film is heavily tailored to meet the expectations of its target audience, those who also follow the cast members' YouTube channels, and that the opinion of film critics would be of no importance. In September 2015, it briefly held the position of the lowest-rated movie of all time on IMDb.
