= ARC/Architectural Resources Cambridge, Inc. =

Founded in 1969, ARC/Architectural Resources Cambridge, Inc. is a national architectural design firm, located in Boston, Massachusetts, that specializes in Science/R&D, biotechnology, Independent Schools, Higher Education, Athletic and Wellness and Arts and Culture. With an emphasis on innovative and sustainable design, ARC has garnered more than 70 awards from a wide range of professional organizations and publications.

Current Firm Principals:

- Peter W. Reiss, AIA, LEED AP
- Jan Taylor, AIA, LEED AP
- Leslie DelleFave, AIA, LEED AP
- Victor Agran, AIA

Previous Principals:

- Arthur Cohen, FAIA, LEED AP
- Jeffreys M. Johnson, AIA, LEED AP
- Thomas N. Loring, AIA
- Henry S. Reeder, FAIA
- Been Zen Wang, AIA
- Philip L. Laird, FAIA, LEED AP
- Robert H. Quigley, AIA
- Robert A. Zverina, AIA

== Selected design portfolio ==
=== Education ===
- Tufts University School of Dental Medicine: Tufts University School of Dental Medicine's five-story, 95,000-square-foot (8,800 m^{2}) vertical expansion, which was designed by ARC and completed in 2009, has received four awards. The Boston Society of Architects gave the project its Honor Award for Healthcare Facilities and the New England Chapter of International Interior Design Association (IIDA) awarded the expansion "Best Education Design in New England." Previously, the project won “Best Practice Awards: Medium Project,” given annually by the Boston chapter of the International Facilities Management Association (IFMA). The project has also achieved LEED Silver Certification. The five-story vertical addition was added on top of the existing 10-story building in Boston.
- Rochester Institute of Technology: In 2010, ARC and SWA Group completed a 189,000-square-foot (17,600 m^{2}) mixed-use project, including student housing units, 20,000 sq ft (1,900 m^{2}) retail space and 12,000 sq ft (1,100 m^{2}) of space for academic related services for Rochester Institute of Technology in Rochester, NY. Known as Global Village, the three-story residential project includes lounge areas, numerous amenities, a central courtyard and plaza and mixed-use retail facilities. As part of the campus outreach to other countries, Global Village houses both students from other countries as well as those who will participate in Co-op programs in countries such as the UAE, Kosovo, and Croatia. Foreign students are provided with a variety of amenities to help them feel at home while students slated for future studies abroad have access to people and information that will help them make the adjustment to living in other countries and experiencing other cultures.
- University of Colorado Leeds School of Business: Designed by ARC, the Koelbel Building at the University of Colorado Leeds School of Business in Boulder has earned LEED Gold Certification from the US Green Building Council. The building has been also applauded for creating a design that stays true to the “Tuscan Vernacular” style of architecture that is prevalent on campus. The Architect of Record for the project was Denver, Colorado-based architectural firm Davis Partnership Architects and the Design Architect was ARC/Architectural Resources Cambridge. The ARC/Davis Partnership Team developed a modern, sustainable design that not only adheres to strict environmental and energy conservation standards, but also enhances the learning experience by facilitating growth, curiosity and interaction. The design also took into account the historic campus' unique, architectural beauty.
- Harvard Medical School: ARC has been involved with several Harvard Medical School projects, including the $261 M New Research Building (NRB) in Boston, Massachusetts. The 739,288 sq ft (68,682.1 m^{2}) NRB is the largest expansion of the Harvard Medical School campus since its founding in 1903. Completed in 2003, the New Research Building features clustered flexible open labs, two-story ‘sky lobbies’ and conferencing facilities. The facility is designed to enhance hospital-based and school-based faculty interaction, accelerating the flow of information from bench to bedside. The building received a Merit Award from the American Institute of Architects' New England Chapter in 2009.
- John F. Kennedy School of Government: ARC has contributed three buildings (Table 1.1) to the JFK School of Government campus since creating the Master Plan in 1976. Fashioned after its neo-Georgian neighbors, the original courtyard concept is reminiscent of adjacent Harvard River Houses. Since the completion of the Littauer Center in 1978, ARC has completed two other buildings and multiple renovations, bringing the campus to over 250,000 sq ft (23,000 m^{2}).

Table 1.1 - ARC Buildings at JFK School of Government
Name	Completed	Size
Littauer Center for Public Administration	1978	105,000 sq ft (9,800 m^{2})
Belfer Center for Public Management	1984	45,000 sq ft (4,200 m^{2})
One Eliot Street	1986	29,000 sq ft (2,700 m^{2})
John F. Kennedy Jr. Forum Renovation, Littauer Center	2003	16,000 sq ft (1,500 m^{2})

The John F. Kennedy Jr. Forum is ARC's most recent contribution to the JFK School of Government campus. Twenty-five years after ARC designed the original “ARCO Forum”, the renovated and rededicated John F. Kennedy Jr. Forum offers multiple seating at three levels for hosting debates, television broadcasts and other events supporting the vital connection between the School and the real world politics. JFK Jr. also served as the inspiration behind the renovation.

=== Science/R&D ===
- Genzyme Corporation: The ARC-designed 127,000-gross-square-foot addition at Genzyme's Landmark Biopharmaceutical Manufacturing Facility along the Charles River in Boston, MA has received LEED Gold Certification from the U.S. Green Building Council. The new addition, which was completed in 2010, houses an expansion of the existing warehouse, a new employee cafeteria, additional office space and conference/meeting rooms, an employee lounge area, locker room facilities, and a consolidated mailroom. This expansion is the latest collaboration between ARC and Genzyme, a partnership that dates back to 1991 when ARC designed Genzyme's original biopharmaceutical manufacturing plant at the same location.
- Genzyme Corporation Science Center: Genzyme's Science Center, a 180,000-square-foot (17,000 m^{2}) facility at Genzyme Corporation's campus in Framingham, MA, is one of the first 10 laboratories in the United States to earn LEED Gold Certification. Designed by ARC, the Genzyme Science Center incorporated several green features including: a sophisticated heating and cooling system, high-efficiency fume hoods for researchers, low-flow water fixtures and landscaping based on drought-tolerant native species. Moreover, ARC's design made extensive use of glass throughout the building in order to maximize day lighting in combination with active artificial lighting controls.
- Genzyme Corporation: Completed in 1994 for $98 M, the 200,000-square-foot (19,000 m^{2}) Biopharmaceutical Manufacturing Plant, located in Allston, Massachusetts, sits on the scenic banks of the Charles River. The Plant features elegantly finished “Harvard Brick”, and is regarded by critics for its immaculate details found in eaves, corners and windows. Others criticize its faux-retro style and bloated scale.
- Albert Sherman Center and Parking Garage: The 515,000-square-foot (47,800 m^{2}) Albert Sherman Center, located in Worcester, Massachusetts, will include wet laboratory space, clean rooms, administrative spaces, educational spaces including a 350-seat auditorium, a conference space, a cafeteria, and campus support spaces. It is expected to be completed in 2012 and is registered for LEED Silver Certification. A centerpiece of this facility will be the Advanced Therapeutics Cluster (ATC) which will comprise RNAi, Stem Cell, and Gene Therapy Research. Additionally, a new Computational Cluster will house the Quantitative Health Sciences Department and the Bioinformatics Program.

=== Corporate ===
- VMware: ARC was retained by VMware to fit-out 53,000 sq ft (4,900 m^{2}) on three floors of their office space in Kendall Square, Cambridge, Massachusetts. The space includes offices, conference rooms and a 3,000 sq ft (280 m^{2}) data center. A large multi-purpose room is used for all company meetings, for catered events and as a staff lounge. Elements of design include the exposure of the waffle slab ceiling in the corner conference rooms and in specific corridor locations to increase the height, lightness and airiness of the space. The design of the wall separating the circulation corridor from the perimeter offices will be almost entirely glass to allow light from the windows to penetrate to the interior of the building.

=== Sports ===
- Episcopal School of Dallas: Designed and built around the school's Wellness for Life Campaign, the Stephen B. Swann Athletic and Wellness Center is a brand new 114,000-square-foot (10,600 m^{2}) new athletic and wellness facility at the Episcopal School of Dallas in Dallas, TX. Designed by ARC and The Beck Group, this state-of-the-art building is projected to consume 17.8 percent less energy. Built in 2010, the building has received LEED Gold Certification and creates a new venue for competitive and recreational sports, truly promoting and instilling healthy lifestyle choices for students. The ARC and The Beck Group design teams worked closely with the ESD community to create an interactive and lively space within a sustainable environment. The dynamic facility intentionally provokes interaction and activity between students and faculty.
- Boston College Alumni Stadium: Located in Chestnut Hill, Massachusetts, the 272,500 sq ft (25,320 m^{2}) Alumni Stadium, home of the BC Eagles, underwent $30 M worth of renovations and additions prior to the 1994 season. ARC led the extensive modernization project, transforming the Big East's smallest, most modestly equipped stadium into a first-class, 44,500-seat Division I-A facility. Notable changes included the demolition of 20,000 seats and the addition of 32,500 new seats, a new scoreboard and instant replay screens, an improved lighting system, a state-of-the-art PA system, new concession and restroom facilities, as well as a new brick and glass exterior façade.
- Boston College Yawkey Athletics Center: Completed in 2005 at a construction cost of $17.2 M, the 72,000 sq ft (6,700 m^{2}) Boston College Yawkey Athletics Center is home to Boston College Football and the Office of Learning Resources for Student-Athletes (LSRA). As part of a long-range athletic facilities master plan, the four-story structure completes the north end of Alumni Stadium, also designed by ARC. The first three floors feature a state-of-the-art sports medicine facility, a 6,000 sq ft (560 m^{2}) fitness center and weight room, tiered 65 and 125-person classrooms, breakout rooms for positional coaching, as well as offices and meeting rooms for coaches and football operations. The fourth floor houses the Office of Learning Resources, which is available to all student athletes and includes a computer lab, study area and six tutorial sites for small-group instruction and one-on-one tutorials. The entire Boston College community has access to the 200-person function room and support spaces that occupy the remaining space on the fourth floor.

=== Library ===
- Carver Public Library: The 21,000 sq ft (2,000 m^{2}) Carver Public Library located in Carver, Massachusetts was designed to be part, along with the Town Hall, of a revitalized Town Green. Completed in 1998 at a construction cost of $2.7 M, the library features three prominent gables meant to evoke the classic New England saltbox style and cranberry barns, which are an integral part of the region. An entry tower with clerestory windows identifies the main entry, bringing natural light into the library reference room at the heart of the building. The new library holds 73,000 volumes and features staff workstations, two general meeting rooms, a Local History Room and a children's program room. Seating for 140 adults and children is available throughout the library in addition to a 100-person meeting space and an additional public meeting room.

=== Historic ===
- The Arsenal on the Charles: Originally established in 1816, the Watertown Arsenal, located in Watertown, Massachusetts, was an American Army facility until 1995. Built in 1917, Arsenal on the Charles Building 311 was reported to be one of the largest steel frame structures in the United States during World War I and developed Allied weaponry for both World Wars. ARC converted the 400,000 sq ft (37,000 m^{2}) abandoned arsenal into a 21st Century office complex, completing the $28 M project in 2000. Multi-story entry lobbies celebrate the volume of space where seacoast guns, tanks and cannons were once manufactured. An original 50-ton gantry crane remains in the main lobby. The Arsenal is registered on the list of historic civil engineering landmarks.

=== Planning ===
- Harvard University, Cambridge, Massachusetts

Kennedy School of Government Master Plan

- University of Pennsylvania, Philadelphia

The Wharton School Master Plan
GSE/SSW/SAS Space Needs Study
LRDP Study

- Arthur D. Little, Inc., Cambridge, Massachusetts

Acorn Park Master Plan

- Bayer Diagnostics, Walpole, Massachusetts

Master Plan

- Millipore Corporation, Bedford, Massachusetts

R&D Campus Master Plan

- Noble and Greenough School, Dedham, Massachusetts

Master Plan

- St. John's School, Houston

Master Plan
