= Bianca Heinicke =

German YouTuber (born 1993)

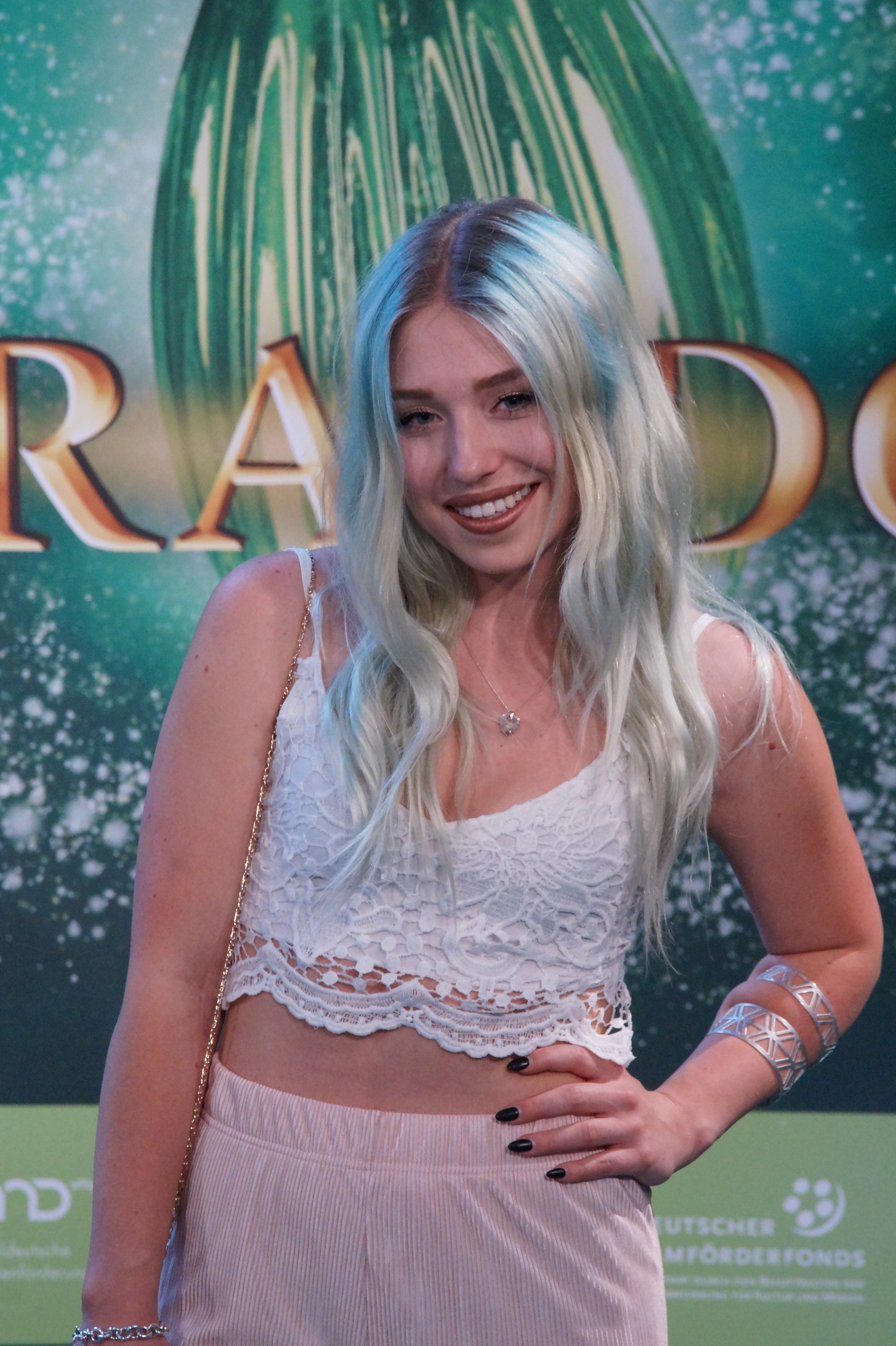
- Heinicke in 2016
- Born: 6 February 1993 (age 33); Cologne, Germany
- Other name: Bibi
- Spouse: Julian Claßen (m. 2018; div. 2024)
- Partner: Timothy Hill (2024–present)
- Children: 2

YouTube information
- Channel: BibisBeautyPalace
- Years active: 2012–2022, 2024–present
- Genres: Beauty; fashion; lifestyle
- Subscribers: 5.71 million
- Views: 2.46 billion
- Last updated: 4 August 2026
- Website: bilou.de

Bianca Heinicke (born 6 February 1993), better known by her YouTube channel name BibisBeautyPalace, is a German fashion and beauty YouTuber. As of May 2023, she has over 5.8 million subscribers on YouTube.

== Career ==
Heinicke began making her videos in December 2012, gaining her first 500 subscribers within less than two months. Her videos focus on hair, makeup, fashion, travel, lifestyle and challenges. She recorded her earliest YouTube videos using a Panasonic HC-V500 video camera.

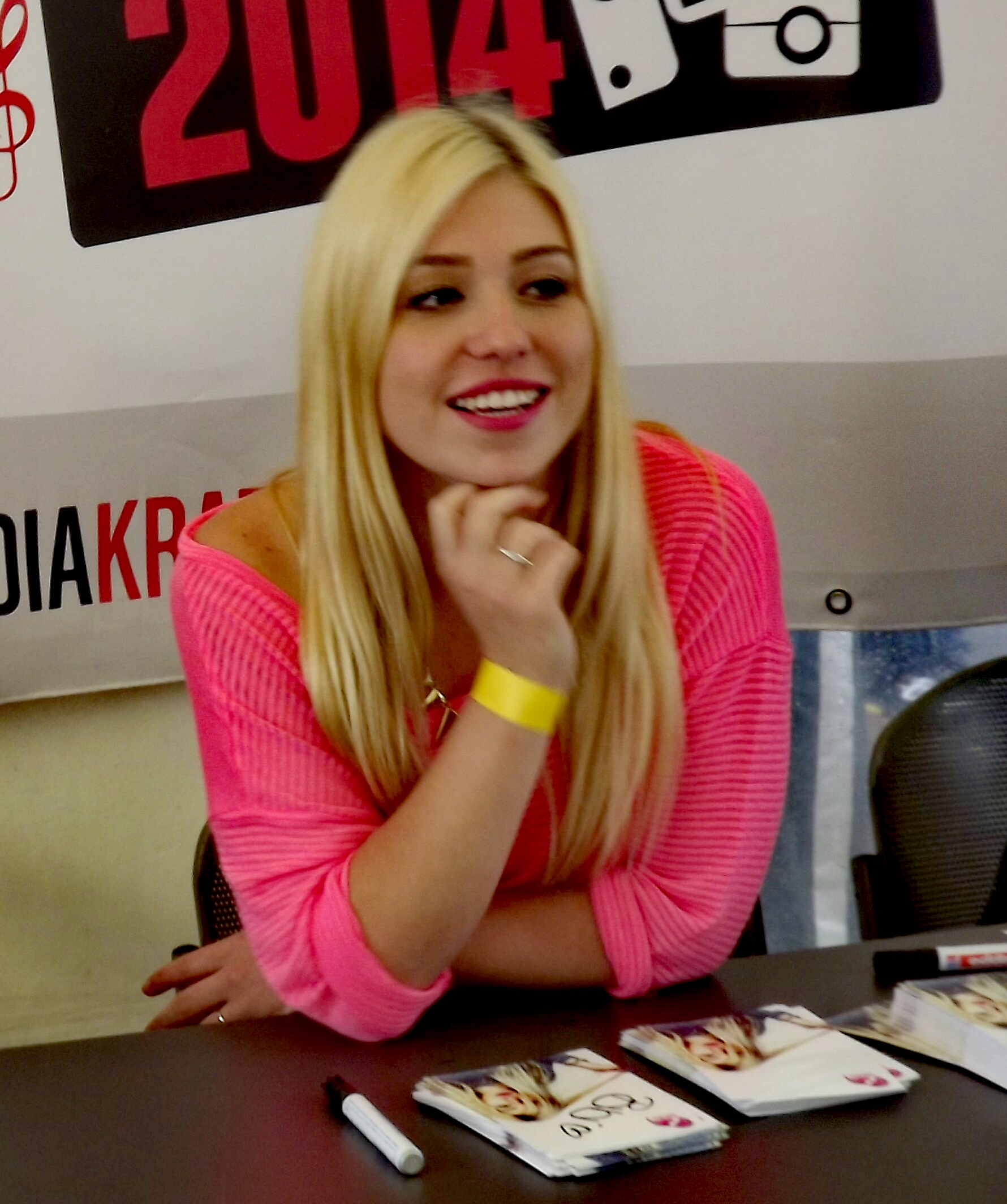
Heinicke in 2014, signing signature cards for attending fans on the Colourgne VideoDays event

In 2014, she won an award in the Beauty, Fashion, and Lifestyle category at the Google Play Awards.

In May 2015, she launched her own cosmetics brand called Bilou, meant as an acronym for "Bibi loves you". Over time, the variety of her cosmetics products, namely the flavours of her shampoos, increased.

Heinicke appeared in the mid-2015 film Kartoffelsalat – Nicht fragen!, which featured an ensemble cast with other major German YouTube personalities.

In October 2015, in cooperation with the German Telekom and Sony Mobile, a customized variant of the Sony Xperia M4 Aqua mobile phone was released in Germany, known as the Bibi-Phone edition. It differentiated from the original with a picture of Bianca's face and her signature printed on the unit's rear cover, and additional wallpaper pictures and ring tones.

In March 2016, her channel surpassed three million subscribers.

In 2015 and 2016, Bianca Claßen, along with her spouse Julian Claßen, appeared in the annual YouTube Rewind.

In 2017, her channel surpassed Erik Range's channel Gronkh and was the fourth most popular YouTube channel in Germany. A campaign attempting to sustain the latter's spot gained traction on social media under the hash tag #AbonniertGronkhDeabonniertBibi ("subscribe to Gronkh, unsubscribe from Bibi"), slightly delaying the surpassion.

In May 2017, Bianca Claßen released her first song under the nickname Bibi H., titled "How It Is (Wap Bap …)". Within several days of its release, the song's video became the eleventh most disliked video on YouTube, and most disliked video on any German YouTube channel, surpassing the multiple formerly most downvoted videos by "ApoRed" within hours.

In November 2017, on the second operational day of her iPhone X smartphone, she noticed a defective pixel on its display panel. She attempted to create a screen capture of that hardware defect, sharing it on Twitter. The incident went viral with responses educating her how a software-based screen capture is unable to capture hardware-based panel defects.

In January 2019, the couple reacted to videos of low view counts, including a reupload of a lost 2015 telephony commercial involving her, posted hours prior to the recording, and a man parodizing their pregnancy photos.

In March 2020, the couple discussed their struggle of finding a hospital to birth their daughter under the COVID-19 pandemic.

In January 2021, the couple found a molded mobile phone case in a wardrobe, and jokingly decided to sell it on eBay as an artistic obstacle. The auction went viral due to her promotion of it on her Instagram Stories channel, clocking in €133.000 as the highest bid. The auction was cancelled, however.

Since the separation from Julian Claßen became known in May 2022, she has lived withdrawn from the public, but is repeatedly stalked by fans. She has not uploaded any more YouTube videos since May 2022. Heinicke lived a withdrawn life from the public until January 2024.

== Television appearances ==
Heinicke made several appearances on national television, including on the Swiss channel "Joiz" in mid-2014, in the backstage of The Voice of Germany in late 2014, on TV total in early 2014 together with Dagi Bee and once again alone in 2015, on ORF (Austria) in 2016, and on Quiz Duel in early 2019.

== Personal life ==
Heinicke grew up in Cologne. After receiving her Abitur, she went to college to study social sciences, but later left in order to focus on making YouTube videos.

She was married to German YouTuber Julian Claßen, nicknamed "Julienco". After a nine-year relationship starting on 1 March 2009, they married on 12 September 2018. She gave birth to their son, Lio, on 4 October 2018. On 20 March 2020 she gave birth to their daughter, Emily. In 2022, the couple announced their separation; their divorce was finalised in 2024. She announced her relationship with life coach and manager Timothy Hill in 2024.
