= Peter Roussel =

American diplomat (1941–2022)

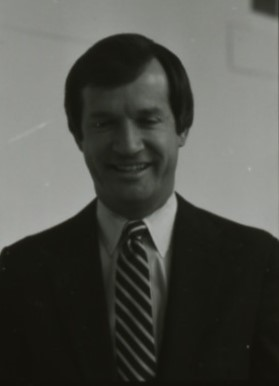
- Roussel in 1979

Personal details
- Born: October 23, 1941
- Died: December 26, 2022 (aged 81)
- Education: University of Houston

Peter Roussel (October 23, 1941 – December 26, 2022) was an American press secretary and public relations executive.

== Early life and education ==
Roussel was born on October 23, 1941. He attended St. John's School in Houston, Texas, and then the University of Houston, before graduating in 1965. Both his parents were journalists, his late father, Hubert Roussel, serving as drama, music and film critic for The Houston Post, 1933 to 1966. During that time he reviewed and interviewed performing arts icons, Arthur Rubenstein, Marian Anderson, Van Cliburn, Judy Garland, Clark Gable, members of the Ballet Russe de Monte Carlo, and others. Roussel's late mother, Dewey Roussel, was also a newspaper reporter and an actress. She helped organize the Houston Stage Canteen during World War II. His older brother, Hubert Roussel, Jr., enlisted in the Army Air Corps during World War II and as a member of a B-29 crew was lost on a mission in the Pacific on December 13, 1944, at age 20. Dewey Roussel's story about her eldest son, "Message of the White Dove", appeared in the September 1985 issue of Reader's Digest. Peter Roussel also had an older sister, Stephanie, a ballerina and actress who died in 2014.

== Career with Federal Government and national figures ==
Peter Roussel began his career with the Federal Government in 1969 when he was asked to be press secretary to then U.S. Congressman George H. W. Bush. When Bush subsequently served as U.S. Ambassador to the United Nations (1971–1973) and Chairman of the Republican National Committee (1973–1974), Roussel continued to serve as Bush's press secretary.

Roussel went on to serve two tours of duty in the White House, as Staff Assistant to President Ford (1974–1976), then as Special Assistant and Deputy Press Secretary to President Reagan (1981–1987).

In 1976 Roussel became a special assistant to President Ford's national campaign director, James A. Baker III. After that he served as communications director for Baker's 1978 campaign for Attorney General of Texas.

Roussel also enjoyed a career in public relations, including as executive vice president of Neumann Roussel Public Relations, 1996–2003. From 2004 to 2008 he was a columnist for Intown magazine, writing a monthly column and serving as editor, June 2005-April 2008.

== Post-government career ==
Roussel was a public speaker, author/playwright and television-radio commentator based in Houston, Texas. In 2009 he was appointed to the Philip G. Warner Endowed Chair in Sam Houston State University's Department of Mass Communication, where he taught courses on public relations and press-presidency interactions.

He is the author of the White House-based novel, Ruffled Flourishes. The novel is a satiric look at the daily travails of reporters covering the White House, attempting to squeeze accurate information from presidential representatives.

== Personal life and death ==
Roussel died from cancer on December 26, 2022, at the age of 81.
