= Friendly Fire (event) =

Charity gaming live stream event

- Friendly Fire
- Genre: Gaming live stream
- Starring: Gronkh; Team PietSmiet; Pandorya; FisHC0p; Der Heider; PhunkRoyal; MrMoregame
- Country of origin: Germany
- Original language: German
- No. of episodes: 10 (+1 special)

Production
- Executive producer: Lena Laaser
- Running time: 720 minutes

Original release
- Release: December 12, 2015

Friendly Fire is a charity event by German YouTubers and streamers on the live streaming service Twitch. It takes place once a year since 2015 on the first Saturday in December. There was one special on April 12, 2020, collecting money for victims of the COVID-19 pandemic. The most recent stream was on December 6, 2025. Each stream is around 12h long and consists of a series of games and challenges. Friendly Fire collected a total of 14.26 Million € (16.06 Million US$) in donation money from viewers and sponsors. The money gets split equally between each years charities. Since Friendly Fire 7, donations have also been collected annually for the Friendly Fire Emergency Relief Fund. The fund is used to make spontaneous donations, for example, in response to natural disasters and other emergencies.

Friendly Fire 12 will be on December 5, 2026, at 3pm CET.

The event won several awards, including the German computer games award in 2018.

== Donations ==
Event	Year	Total Donations	Donations by Viewers
Friendly Fire	2015	170,000€	170,000€
Friendly Fire 2	2016	300,000€	200,000€
Friendly Fire 3	2017	640,000€	470,000€
Friendly Fire 4	2018	888,000€	620,000€
Friendly Fire 5	2019	1,190,000€	730,000€
Friendly Distancing	2020 (April)	>162,000€	>147,000€
Friendly Fire 6	2020 (December)	1,654,548€	1,052,548€
Friendly Fire 7	2021	1,984,400€	>1,281,000€
Friendly Fire 8	2022	1,783,208€	>1,000,000€
Friendly Fire 9	2023	1,428,733€	>1,038,000€
Friendly Fire 10	2024	>2,000,000€	>1,221,000€
