= Samuel Samson =

American diplomat

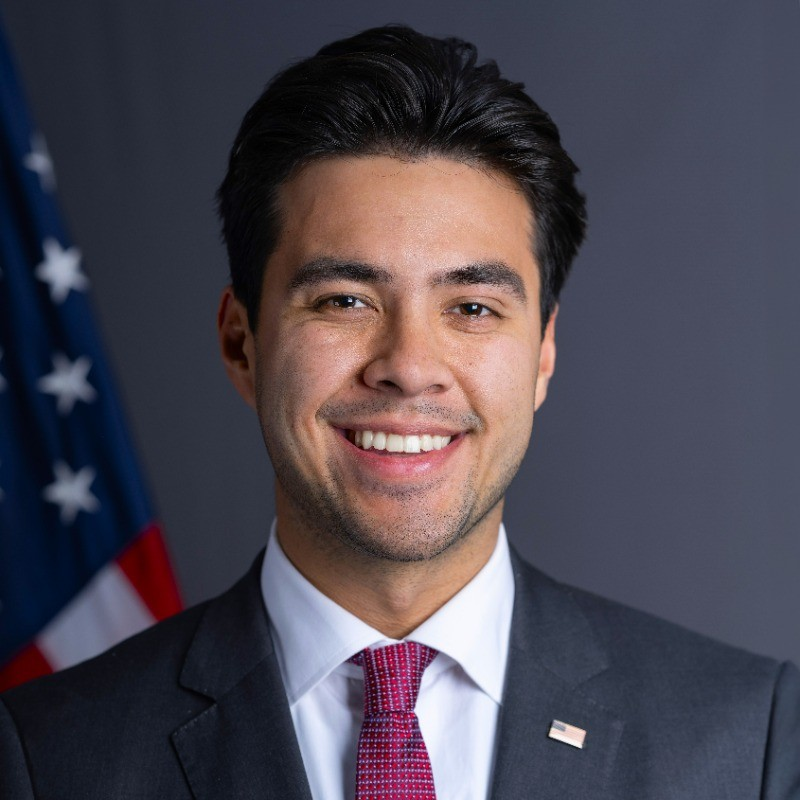

Deputy Assistant Secretary for the Bureau of Democracy, Human Rights, and Labor
- Incumbent
- Assumed office May 3, 2026
- President: Donald Trump

Personal details
- Born: September 15, 1998 (age 28) Boston, Massachusetts, USA
- Party: Republican Party
- Education: University of Texas at Austin (BA) Hillsdale College (MA)

Samuel David Samson is an American diplomat serving as Deputy Assistant Secretary of State for the Bureau of Democracy, Human Rights, and Labor (DRL) at the United States State Department. He previously served as Senior Policy Advisor in DRL, having first been appointed by President Donald Trump on January 20, 2025.

== Personal life and career ==
Samson was born in Boston; he attended Catholic schools in Houston, Texas. Samson studied political theory and business at the University of Texas at Austin and earned a master's degree from Hillsdale College. After graduation, he held a fellowship with the Thomistic Institute, a Washington, DC Catholic think tank. In 2022 he joined conservative nonprofit American Moment, eventually becoming its fundraising director. In January 2025, Samson was appointed as a Senior Advisor in DRL.

Following the 2025 JD Vance speech at the Munich Security Conference, Samson led a March 2025 delegation to London to address the issues raised. While there, he attended a breakfast meeting with Nigel Farage of the right-wing political party Reform UK discussing abortion, censorship and online safety and met with pro-life activist Livia Tossici-Bolt, who was later convicted of breaching a clinic buffer zone. He also made a high-profile trip to France in May, where he raised concerns about censorship and lawfare against people holding conservative viewpoints.

In June 2025, Samson traveled to Cape Town, South Africa. His meetings with government, political, civic and business leaders focused on attacks on rural white farmers. Following his visit, DRL posted a statement to social media claiming the crime situation in the country was “not conducive to growth or collaboration,” citing statistics from AfriForum. A mid-August New York Times report, citing department officials familiar with the matter, said Samson led the drafting of the 2025 human rights report on South Africa after DRL experts refused to cooperate.

Samson returned to Europe in December, visiting Austria, the Czech Republic, Hungary and Slovakia. In remarks to media during that visit he said those countries were “deeply committed to our shared values of democracy, self-government, free speech, national sovereignty, and more” and criticized “partisan and ideological NGOs” previous administrations had engaged with had been "trying to promote different [...] radical progressive concepts like open borders, gender theory, DEI, et cetera". He described economic regulation; censorship tactics to obstruct the democratic process; mass migration, which he argued implicated human rights through rising crime rates. Samson concluded that the Trump administration and its National Security Strategy were “pursuing a strong Europe, a sovereign Europe, a prosperous Europe, a Europe that’s at peace...we want to be helpful to them as our civilizational allies.”

Samson was appointed as DRL Deputy Assistant Secretary of State on May 3, 2026. In July 2026 Brazil refused his application for a visa to accompany DRL Assistant Secretary Riley M. Barnes in order to meet with officials and Flavio Bolsonaro, presidential candidate and son of Jair Bolsonaro, ex-president convicted of an attempted coup, about election security in advance of Brazil's October general election.

== Views ==
In May 2025, Samson authored an article titled "The Need for Civilizational Allies in Europe" on the State Department's official Substack page. Samson said the US and Europe enjoyed “a shared Western civilizational heritage.” However, the promise of “global liberalism” had failed and that "Europe has devolved into a hotbed of digital censorship, mass migration, restrictions on religious freedom, and numerous other assaults on democratic self-governance.” He expressed concern over actions taken against Tosicci-Bolt and other buffer zone victims, France's Marine Le Pen, Germany’s “popular Alternative für Deutschland (AfD) party” and others in Poland and Romania. He claimed “Christian nations like Hungary are unjustly labeled as authoritarians and human rights abusers” and “a similar strategy of censorship, demonization, and bureaucratic weaponization was utilized against President Trump and his supporters.” He concluded that the US-European partnership “must be founded upon our shared heritage rather than globalist conformity.”

Samson delivered remarks to the Hungarian Institute of International Affairs during his December 2025 trip. He defined "the West" as "a particular people, a particular civilization—one you know when you see it, when you experience it, when you belong to it." He compared efforts of European governments, “activist NGOs” and supranational bodies using “technology, courts, and political institutions to restrict patriotic voices, erode national sovereignty, and enforce rigid ideological conformity” to Communist oppression after World War II. Repeating his concerns for Le Pen, AfD and others who had been “barred from a fair electoral process through technical disqualifications,” he praised Hungary for its “admirable resistance” to the European Union’s migration policies, likewise referencing the grooming gangs scandal in the UK.

Speaking in London in June 2026, he defined “Western civilization” as "a people with a clear-eyed vision of who man is and what he is made for—who recognize, at the core, that man is made in the Imago Dei, the image of God." He further argued that “there is a movement across the West that treats our great inheritance as a source of guilt and shame, as something to atone for rather than to hold sacred. It calls tradition backward, faith antiquated, patriotism extremism, the family oppressive, and borders xenophobic. In this new religion, rights are not the recognition of God-given dignity but the whims of governments, NGOs, and bureaucratic institutions." Samson called DRL’s Office of Natural Rights a “major advance...rejecting novel and ideological ideas that have grown out of a positivist approach to human rights, it returns America to its Western roots.”

== See also ==
- Foreign policy of the second Trump administration
- White South African refugee program
- Migration and asylum policy of the European Union
