= Alan Lake Chidsey =

American writer

- Born: March 13, 1904; Easton, Pennsylvania, U.S.
- Died: October 1980 (aged 76)
- Occupations: Education, school administrator

Alan Lake Chidsey (March 13, 1904 – October 1980) was an American secondary educator and college administrator.

== Early life and education ==
Chidsey was born in Easton, Pennsylvania, the son of Andrew Dwight Chidsey. He graduated from Union College in 1925 and continued his education at Harvard University.

== Career ==
A professional educator and school administrator, before World War II, Chidsey served as headmaster of the Pawling School (today called Trinity-Pawling School) in Pawling, New York and as principal of the now-defunct Arizona Desert School in the Catalina Mountains near Tucson, Arizona. Military service interrupted his career as a teacher and school administrator.

In 1942, he was inducted as a lieutenant in the United States Army. Rising to the rank of lieutenant colonel by 1945, Chidsey served in a variety of administrative positions in Washington, D.C., and developed educational materials for the wartime Army.

After World War II, Chidsey briefly served as assistant dean of students of the University of Chicago, with supervision over undergraduate activities. In 1946 a group of prominent Houstonians invited Chidsey to their city to discuss the establishment of a coeducational private school. He was asked to spearhead efforts which led to the establishment of St. John's School, located in the River Oaks neighborhood of Houston. Though St. John's opened with 344 students and a small campus linked to St. John the Divine Church, it grew into a large, independent school with a sizeable campus scattered over several city blocks in central Houston. Chidsey served as headmaster of St. John's from its founding until May 1966, when he was succeeded by Elwood Kimball Salls. Chidsey shaped the school in its formative years. He even supplied the school's seal, which was a near-exact replication of the Trinity-Pawling seal.

Chidsey was chairman of the National Council of Independent Schools.

== Publications ==
Chidsey was also the author of several books, including historical works on Rustam, Odysseus, and Romulus; Heintz, a satire of service in World War II; and My Animal Friends, a book of poems about animals with lessons for people.

- Rustam: Lion of Persia (1930, illustrated by Lois Lenski)
- Heintz (1945, illustrated by F. Moylan Fitts)
- There Cometh Immanuel (1949, a choral play, with music by George Alex Kevan)
- The Bishop: A Portrait of the Right Reverend Clinton S. Quin (1966)
- My Animal Friends

== Personal life ==
Chidsey married Catherine Gillespie Robinson in 1927. They divorced in 1933. In 1934 Chidsey married Ellis Cochran Brown from Greenwich, Connecticut. They had two children, Peter Chidsey and Ellen Chidsey Hays. Chidsey died in 1980, at the age of 76.
