= How It Is (Wap Bap ...) =

"How It Is (Wap Bap …)"
- Singles cover art

Single by Bibi H.
- Released: 5 May 2017
- Genre: Pop, Euro Pop, Schlager, Folk
- Length: 2:57
- Label: Warner Music Germany
- Songwriters: Dave Knight, Sam Sommer
- Producer: Chinzilla Films

Music video
- "Bibi H. - How it is (wap bap...)" on YouTube

"How It Is (Wap Bap …)" is a song by a German YouTuber Bianca Heinicke, better known as "Bibi H." from the YouTube channel "BibisBeautyPalace". The song is sung in English and it was released on 5 May 2017, by the record label Warner Music Germany. The corresponding music video is the most disliked video from any German YouTube channel. For some time this video was ranked 6th in the international most disliked YouTube videos, as of dislikes being hidden it is at position 34.

== Background ==
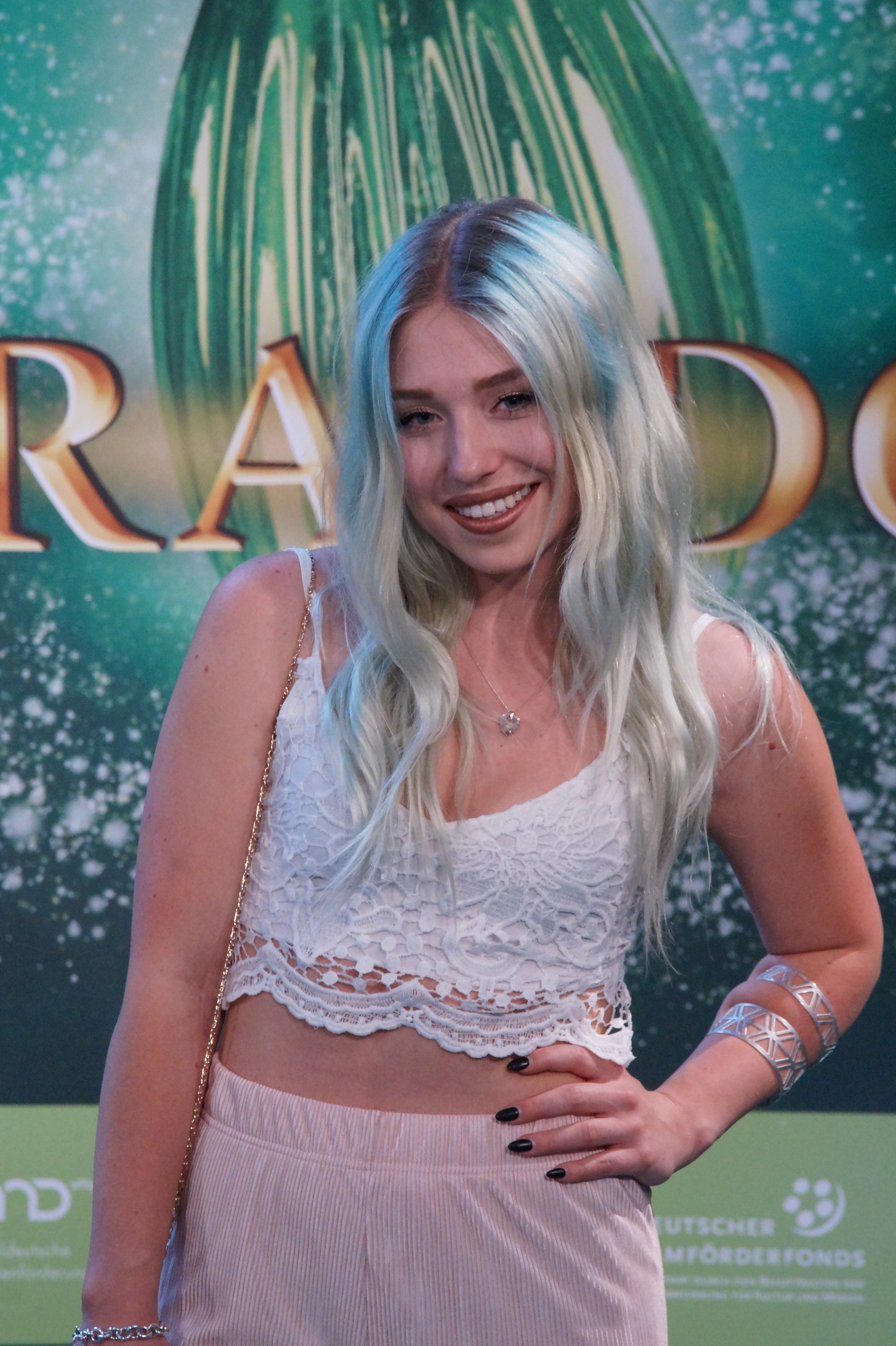
Bianca 'Bibi' Heinicke of "BibisBeautyPalace"

"How It Is (Wap Bap …)" was written by Dave Knight and Sam Sommer and composed by the latter. The production was undertaken by the film production company Chinzilla Films.

On 10 December 2016, Heinicke published a video on her YouTube channel, reporting to be interested in a music career. After that, she contacted the songwriter Sam Sommer in order to produce her own song. He sent her the demo version of a song he had written years ago. Heinicke recorded the vocals of this demo version afterwards. Concerning the release as well as the promotion campaign, she worked together with Warner Music and additionally took singing lessons.

== Musical notation and content ==
The song is composed in 4/4 time and starts with a melody, played on a ukulele. The tempo is at 73 beats per minute. The rhythm is set by high-pitched piano sounds. After four beats, Heinicke sets in with the first stanza. In the chorus, a kick starts to accompany the song. After another two stanzas and a chorus, the song comes to a breakdown before the chorus sets in for a second time.

In the song, the narrator says to remain optimistic although pursued by misfortune, and that this proves to be the right way in the end. Heinicke summarized the content of the song in her announcement video, saying that it was about the story of a person who, in spite of many negative events, should not give up.

== Music video ==
The official music video was filmed in the house "Huize Herbosch" in Antwerp, Flanders, Belgium in 2 days. The editing took 2 months.

== Reception ==
=== Critical response ===
Upon its release, "How It Is (Wap, Bap ...)" was met with generally negative reviews from contemporary music critics. The main points of criticism were the lyrics, the voice and pronunciation of the singer, as well as the use of Auto-Tune. Nicolas Heine, writing for German online magazine Dance-Charts, criticized the song as flat and childish, while comparing it to advertising jingles. Heine concluded that the song's success was the only positive aspect, mostly attributed to it being unoffensive. Carsten Heidböhmer from Stern similarly gave a negative review of the song, pointing out the chorus as obtrusive and the concept of the lyrics trite. Heidböhmer jokingly noted that "How It Is (Wap, Bap ...)" has "the potential to become the most unpopular song of all time.". Beyond the widely negative feedback from critics, "How It Is (Wap, Bap ...)" was also accused of plagiarizing "The Show" (2008) by Australian singer Lenka. Multiple publications have noted the rhythm, melody and notes as being very similar.

The promotional campaign of the song also aroused criticism. While critics believed the announcement that additional CDs would only be produced if there was a high number of pre-orders was untrue, it was also assumed to be an agenda for higher profit. Additionally, the reason for the release of the song was questioned due to the lack of Heinicke's singing abilities. 2 days after the release, Heinicke prominently responded to the reproaches and the criticism, appearing surprised by the massive attention in one of her vlogs. She further emphasized that not everybody had to like the song and that everybody should judge it for themselves.

=== Further reaction ===
With over 3 million dislikes, the music video is the most disliked video on any German YouTube channel, more than twice as much as the former record holder.

The music video became one of the most disliked videos on YouTube only a few days after being uploaded. Later, the video reached more than 2 million dislikes. Currently, it is the thirty-fourth most disliked video on YouTube, with over 3 million dislikes.

The song and the video also attracted mockery by other content creators who satirized it.

A few days after the original was published, the rapper Jonas Platin uploaded a version of the original with edited acoustics which he claimed to be a recording of the song without pitch correction. His video spread quickly across various social networks and attracted a lot of attention. Platin later revealed the video to be fake.

== Charts ==
"How It Is (Wap Bap …)" entered the Official German Charts at number 9, with Heinicke registering her first single ranking position. The track also reached number 5 and 52 in Austria and Switzerland, respectively.

Chart (2017)	Peak position
Austria (Ö3 Austria Top 40)	5
Germany (Official German Charts)	9
Switzerland (Schweizer Hitparade)	52

== See also ==
- List of most-disliked YouTube videos
