= Lauren Averett Byers =

American physician-scientist

- Occupation: Medical Oncologist

Academic background
- Education: BA, molecular biology, 1998, Princeton University; MD, 2003, Baylor College of Medicine; MS, 2009, patient-based research The University of Texas Graduate School of Biomedical Sciences

Lauren Averett Byers is an American physician-scientist. She is a Professor and Thoracic Section Chief of Thoracic/Head and Neck Medical Oncology at The University of Texas MD Anderson Cancer Center. In 2020 Byers received the Heine Hansen Lectureship Award for Small Cell Lung Cancer from the International Association for the Study of Lung Cancer. Byers was elected as a member of the American Society for Clinical Investigation in 2021 and as a Fellow of the American Association for the Advancement of Science in 2025 for her contributions to the field of small cell lung cancer research.

== Early life and education ==
Growing up, Byers was first encouraged to pursue a research career by her high school biology teacher. She earned her Bachelor of Arts degree in molecular biology at Princeton University in 1998, her medical degree at Baylor College of Medicine in 2003 and her Master of Science degree in patient-based research at The University of Texas Graduate School of Biomedical Sciences in 2009.

== Career ==
Following her residency in internal medicine at Johns Hopkins Hospital, Byers joined the University of Texas MD Anderson Cancer Center (MD Anderson) in 2006 as a clinical fellow in medical oncology. During her fellowship, Byers investigated the molecular differences between small cell lung cancer and non-small cell lung cancer. To assist her in her research, Byers was the recipient of the 2008 American Society of Clinical Oncology Young Investigator Award. By the end of her fellowship, Byers demonstrated that targeting the DNA repair protein PARP1 could be an effective therapy in patients with small cell lung cancer. She also discovered more biomarkers to identify new subtypes of lung cancer. As a result of her discoveries, Byers was offered an assistant professorship in Thoracic/Head and Neck Medical Oncology at MD Anderson.

As an assistant professor, Byers continued to research biomarkers of epithelial–mesenchymal transition. Following her promotion to associate professor, she helped create the first standardized small cell lung cancer molecular classification. Byers received the 2025 Edith and Peter O’Donnell Award in Medicine from the Academy of Medicine, Engineering and Science of Texas for her "fundamental discoveries and contributions to identifying novel therapeutic strategies for small cell lung cancer." She was also elected a Fellow of the American Association for the Advancement of Science "for her contributions to the field of small cell lung cancer (SCLC) research."

Dr. Byers serves as PI on multiple awards including NCI R01, U01 and U24 awards focused on lung cancer. She is co-PI for the NCI’s Small Cell Lung Cancer Consortium, Chair of the MD Anderson Cancer Center Multidisciplinary Research Program, co-leader of the MD Anderson Cancer Center Lung CCSG Program, and a project leader in the MD Anderson/UT Southwestern Lung SPORE. As a clinical investigator, Dr. Byers has led a number of clinical trials investigating new therapeutic targets and biomarkers, including the first CAR T-cell for SCLC patients.
