= Latina (magazine) =

Defunct American magazine

- June/July 2016 cover featuring Demi Lovato
- Categories: Lifestyle, entertainment, beauty and fashion
- First issue: June 1996
- Final issue: 2018
- Company: Latina Media Ventures, LLC
- Country: United States
- Language: English
- ISSN: 1099-890X

Latina was an American fashion magazine published in English by Latina Media Ventures.

In May 2010, Latina Media Ventures named editorial director Galina Espinoza and publisher Lauren Michaels co-presidents of the company. Latina was named to Adweek's "Hot List" in 2000 and 2001 and named Best Magazine by Advertising Age in 2000.

== History ==
Latina was founded in 1996 by Christy Haubegger under Latina Publications, LLC. Haubegger, then a 28-year-old Stanford Law School graduate. The first issue featured Jennifer Lopez on the cover. In 2000, the company changed its name to Latina Media Ventures, LLC. Haubegger now works at Creative Artists Agency and remains a member of the board for Latina Media Ventures. The magazine had an audience of approximately 3 million and was named Best Magazine by Advertising Age in 2000.

The magazine's covers consistently featured prominent Latinas like Jennifer Lopez, Selena Gomez, Paulina Rubio, Jessica Alba, Shakira, Eva Longoria, Salma Hayek, Eva Mendes, Christina Aguilera, Naya Rivera, America Ferrera and Supreme Court Justice Sonia Sotomayor. The November 2015 issue featured girl group Fifth Harmony, whose three out of five members are Latinas, marking the first time two non-Latinas were featured on the cover of the magazine.

Latina Media Ventures faced accusations in 2017 of not paying its staff in nearly a month. That year the publisher also laid-off six of its thirty employees, was behind its production schedule, and had its account frozen by Citibank. In 2018 amidst payroll problems, Robyn Moreno, co-president of Latina Media Ventures, resigned.

== See also ==
- Hispanic
- People en Español
- Dolores Prida
