= Veritas Science Center =

Harvard University research building

Coordinates: 42.3387°N 71.1030°W

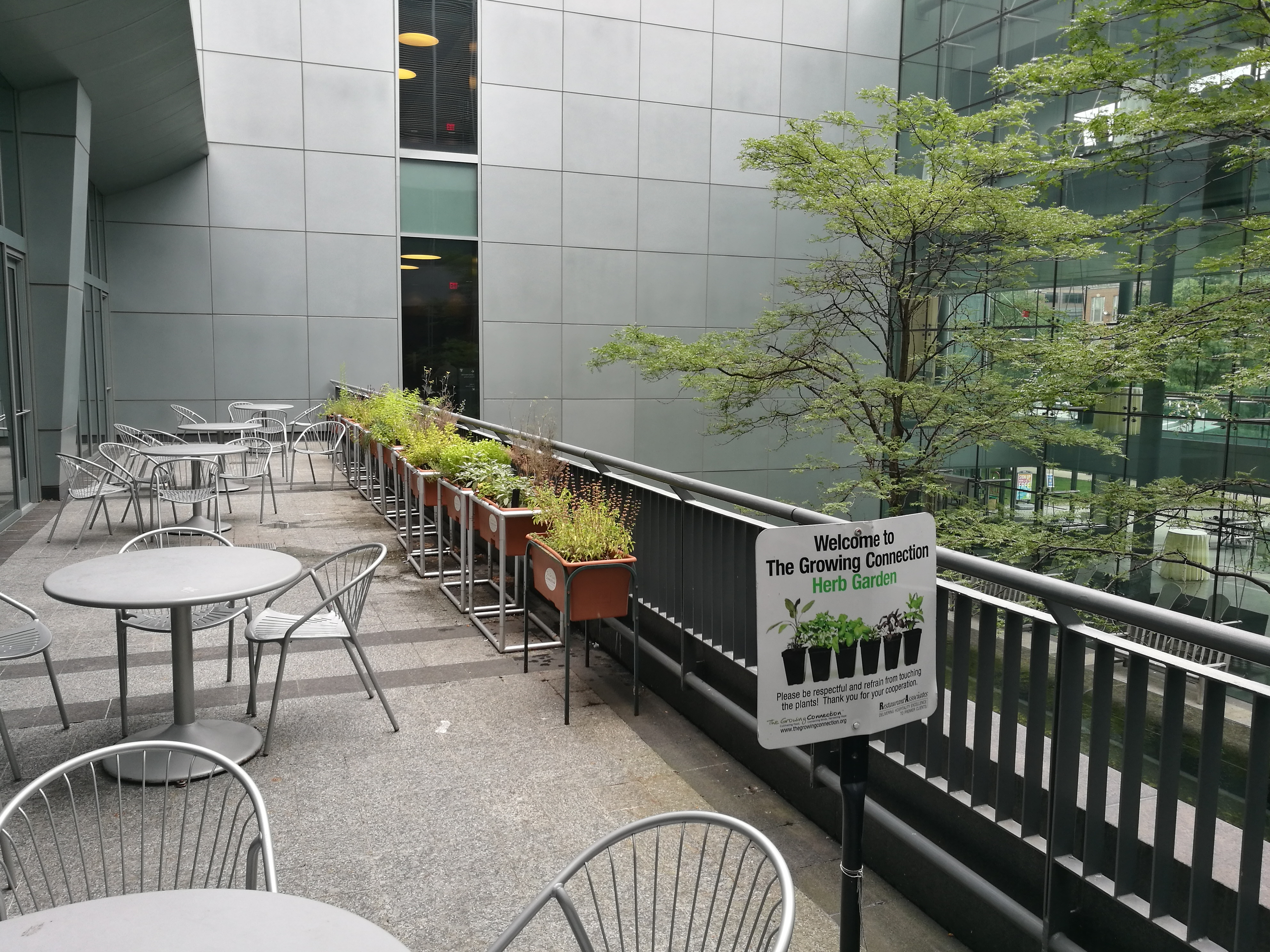
Inner Courtyard

The Veritas Science Center (formerly New Research Building or NRB) is the largest building ever built by Harvard University, and was dedicated on September 24, 2003, by the then president of Harvard University, Lawrence H. Summers and the dean of the Harvard Medical School, Joseph Martin. It was renamed the Veritas Science Center on September 3, 2025.

It is an integrated biomedical research facility, located at 77 Avenue Louis Pasteur, Boston, Massachusetts, at the Longwood Medical Area and has 525,000 square feet (48,800 m^{2}) of space. It cost $260 million to build, and houses more than 800 researchers, and many more graduate students, lab assistants, and staff workers. The building sits across the street from the Boston Latin School on the former site of Boston English High School.

It constitutes the largest expansion of Harvard Medical school witnessed in the last 100 years. It houses the Departments of Genetics and Immunology of the Harvard Medical School. It is also the home for the Brigham and Women's Division of Genetics. It is also home to many meetings, and has a 500-seat auditorium.

The architects were Architectural Resources Cambridge, Inc. (ARC) who are active in the Boston/Cambridge area and have built other educational and research facilities.
