= Mediakraft Networks =

German multi-channel network

Mediakraft Networks GmbH was a German multi-channel network based in Munich. The company published and marketed online video content and operated YouTube creator networks in Germany. Mediakraft Networks maintained offices in Munich, Cologne, Berlin, Hamburg, Warsaw and Istanbul.

== History ==
Mediakraft Networks was founded in September 2011 as a network of YouTubers for YouTubers and is regarded as leading German multi-channel network (MCN). In August 2012 the former CEO of Endemol, Ynon Kreiz, bought shares in Mediakraft Networks. In October 2012 Medakraft launched Ponk, which presented comedy videos and was Germany's first domestic YouTube channel. Ponk stood for Perfekt orientierte neue Komedians.

In December 2012 Shortcut Ventures invested a seven-figure sum in Mediakraft. In 2013 the company started subsidiaries in the Netherlands, Poland and Turkey. On 10 July 2014 Mediakraft announced it had raised €16M ($23M USD) from various investors. One of the investors was the Cologne-based media group M. DuMont Schauberg. By fall 2014 Mediakraft employed 130.

Notable German YouTube channels that belonged to Mediakraft Networks include Freshtorge, Die Lochis, Bullshit TV and Nela Lee. Former Network members were inter alia LeFloid, daaruum, Simon Unge, Dner and ApeCrime.

In January 2015 Mediakraft Networks co-founder and CSO Jan Schlueter and Christoph Krachten left the company and were replaced by Levent Gültan and Spartacus Olsson. Krachten remained a shareholder. On 20 March 2015 Boris Bolz, formerly of Red Bull Germany, joined Mediakraft as chief commercial officer.

Jan Schlueter joined Hashplay Inc, a San Francisco-based company in the Data Visualisation space in January 2015 .

In June 2017 Gamigo acquired Mediakraft Networks for an undisclosed sum.

In December 2021, the company announced that Mediakraft would cease operations.
