= Gronkh =

German YouTuber (born 1977)

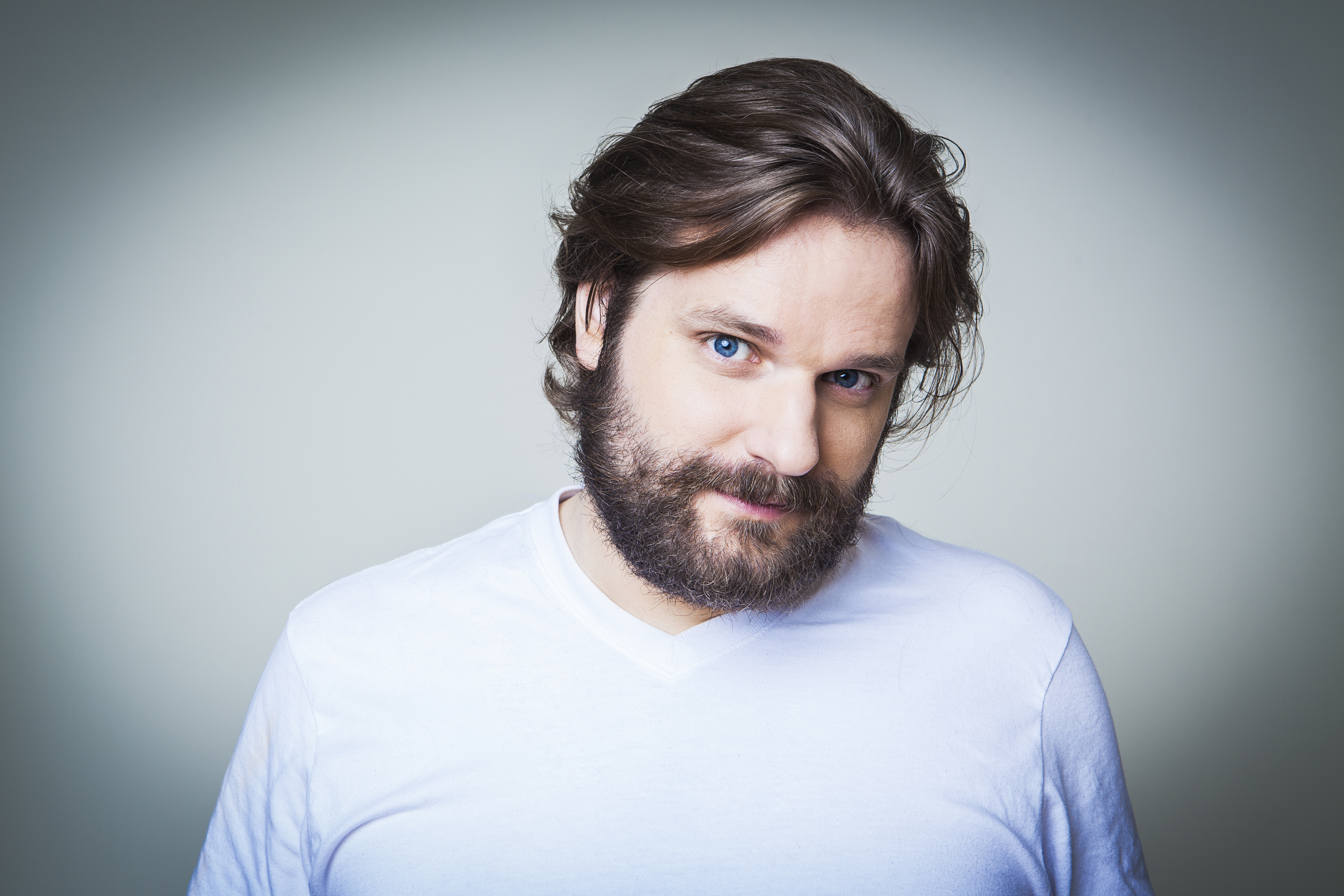
- Gronkh in 2013
- Born: Erik Range; 10 April 1977 (age 49); Braunschweig, Germany
- Other names: Gronkh, Gregor Onkh, Das E

Twitch information
- Channel: Gronkh
- Years active: 2014–present
- Genre: Gaming
- Followers: 1.8 million

YouTube information
- Channel: Gronkh
- Years active: 2010–present
- Genres: Let's Play; comedy; vlog
- Subscribers: 5 million
- Views: 4 billion
- Last updated: 26 January 2026
- Website: gronkh.tv

Erik Range (born 10 April 1977), better known as Gronkh, is a German YouTuber, video game developer, computer and video game journalist, and entrepreneur. Range marketed games through the company PlayMassive GmbH, which runs a computer games website, but stepped back in January 2018. Gronkh is the most popular representative of the Let's Play genre in Germany and the fourth biggest YouTuber in Germany.

== Life and work ==
Erik Range was born to a German father and a Russian mother in Braunschweig in 1977. He first gained recognition in the computer games industry as the guide for Bard characters that featured in the online role playing game Meridian 59. This is where he first used the gamer-tag "Gronkh", which he still uses today. Range said his pseudonym is a portmanteau of the name "Gregor Onkh". He has been managing partner and co-founder of PlayMassive GmbH since 2009. Fellow co-founder of the company is Valentin Matthias Rahmel, whose online pseudonym is Sarazar. Rahmel collaborates with Range on YouTube.

Since 2010, Range has regularly published Let's Play videos, in which he talks about his progress in various games. He published his first video on 1 April 2010; a test recording for the online game Allods Online. Since then, he has become one of the most popular German-speaking providers of these formats. His YouTube channel has had over 4 million subscribers and over 1.7 billion video views, and is one of the most successful channels on the website. He is one of the first commercial German creators and providers of related videos. Range's work is supported by game manufacturers that want to promote for their own products through cooperation. The game developers of Daedalic Entertainment reported an increase in sales of Edna & Harvey: The Breakout after the game was promoted on Range's channel. Since early 2012, Gronkh was registered as a trademark to PlayMassive GmbH at the German Patent and Trademark Office.

Range has been in a relationship with Tatjana Werth (alias Pandorya) since December 2012.

In 2018, Range left the PlayMassive GmbH and took the Gronkh trademark with him. He founded his own company Gods of Gaming GmbH. Some gamers formerly employed by the PlayMassive GmbH followed him and are now employed by his new company.

Range personally holds a German broadcasting license for GronkhTV and Gronkh broadcasting 'stations', although he considers the license to be useless. In 2017, Range was one of several high-profile YouTubers / live streamers who were targeted by a German authority (the Landesanstalt für Medien NRW) that their online-activities require a broadcasting license. He is of the opinion that his activities don't require such an expensive license. But to avoid a long and costly legal struggle he applied for a broadcasting license in October 2017 and was granted one in January 2018. He was criticised for giving in to the demands instead of fighting them in court, setting a bad example. Some of the other targeted YouTubers / live streamers instead avoided the demands by emigrating from Germany or by stopping their activities.

== Internet presence ==
Range operates the website Gronkh.de and Gronkh.tv. In 2021, Range launched Gronkh.tv where he uploads his past Twitch Streams. This is a result of NetzDG blocking a lot of German streams in Twitch's stream-archive, including Range's. Gronkh.tv is free to watch for everyone and even has no ads on it. On the website Range has uploaded recent streams as well as old ones with the goal to have every stream Range ever streamed uploaded to it. However, Gronkh.de is not active and as of 2021 redirects to Gronkh.tv.

While working with Rahmel, Range also operated a real-life channel called Die Superhomies, which was about the two men's travels. As of 2015, the channel has gathered around 440,000 subscribers since 2006, but hasn't been updated for years.

Range's best-known series is his Let's Play Minecraft series, which he started 19 October 2010 and ended on 25 January 2014. He published 10- to 20-minute episodes and received around 1,000,000 views per video. As of 2015, there are 1,278 parts of this series. Episode #1000 was supposed to be released on 15 April 2013, but instead, episode #999.1, and subsequently the episodes #999.2 – #999.999 were released, which is why the last episode is numbered #1,251. From 18 May 2012 until 28 November 2014, the online video portal MyVideo had featured a live stream, in which Sarazar and Gronkh played new games together or interacted with viewers. The live stream regularly reached over 65,000 spectators. On 1 March 2013, Range worked with other representatives of Let's Play to organize MyVideo live streams featuring "Last Man Standing" videos, in which Range played computer games with his team against PietSmiet's Hard Reset for about eight hours. The live stream had more than a million viewers.

In 2014, Range started to stream on the streaming platform Twitch, with more than a million followers and more than 71 million channel views in 2019. He was ranked worldwide no. 90 in followers and no. 137 in viewers on Twitch in 2019.

From mid-April 2014 to summer 2016, a 24-hour stream of the Let's Play videos and other commentators of Gronkh.de were shown. As of 3 March 2018, Range is the fourth most subscribed YouTube channel in Germany with more than 4,750,000 subscribers, the most subscribed channel in Germany is the football channel freekickerz with more than 6,209,000 subscribers.

Range is a co-founder and co-host of the live stream charity event Friendly Fire, held since 2015 once a year before Christmas. The event has earned multiple awards. In 2018 up to 100,000 viewers watched its 12 hour live stream on Twitch.
