= Masters of Rock (festival) =

Czech heavy metal festival

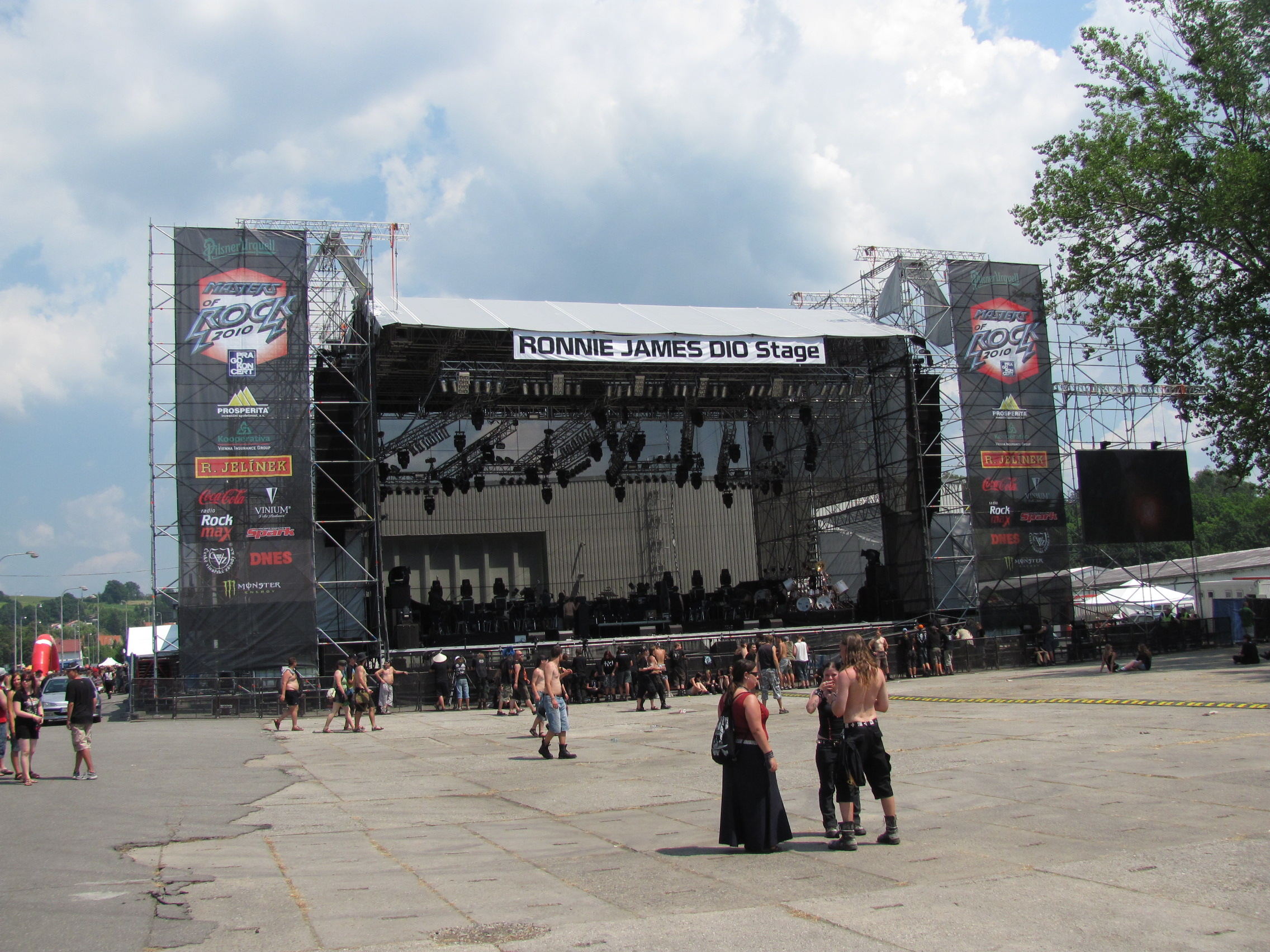
- Masters of Rock 2010 main stage
- Genre: Heavy metal
- Dates: July and November
- Locations: Summer - Rudolf Jelínek distillery area in Vizovice, Czech Republic; Winter - Sportovní hala Euronics in Zlín, Czech Republic
- Years active: 2003–present
- Website: www.mastersofrock.cz/en

Masters of Rock is a metal festival in Vizovice, Czech Republic. The main styles represented at this festival are power metal, speed metal, and heavy metal. In the past, the festival has featured bands such as Judas Priest, Motörhead, Slayer, Helloween, Uriah Heep, Manowar, Dream Theater, Nightwish, Accept, Anthrax, Sweet, Twisted Sister, Europe, HammerFall, Stratovarius, Gamma Ray, Rhapsody of Fire, Sabaton, Kreator, Edguy, Rage - also with symphonic orchestra, Tarja Turunen, Apocalyptica, Within Temptation, Children of Bodom, Avantasia, Sebastian Bach, Behemoth, Amon Amarth, and many more. The 2005 attendance was over 20,000, the 2006 one over 25,000 and finally the 2007 was over 30,000. The festival is held every summer and the Winter morphosis takes place in November in the town of Zlín. Since 2010 the main stage of summer festival is named after Ronnie James Dio, who died earlier that year.

== Lineups ==
=== 2024 ===
Masters of Rock 2024 was held from Thursday 11 July to Sunday 14 July.

Ronnie James Dio Stage
Thursday	Friday	Saturday	Sunday
Fleret; Metalinda; Dragonhammer; Slope; Melechesh; Turmion Kätilöt; Sodom; Bruce Dickinson; Stratovarius; Moonspell	Denoi; Osyron; Dark Sky; Any Given Day; Serious Black; Die Happy; Unleash the Archers; Doro; Electric Callboy; Judas Priest; Alestorm; Soilwork	Gate Crasher; Exit; Sickret; Wytch Hazel; Fixation; Dalriada; Amalgama; Cyhra; Dynazty; Cavalera; Avantasia; Sirenia	Blax; Symfobia; Tri State Corner; Eleine; Annisokay; Delain; Rage + Lingua Mortis Orchestra; KK's Priest; Amaranthe; Accept

Second Stage
Thursday	Friday	Saturday	Sunday
Intolerance; Snaefell; Erin; Sandonorico; Surma; Metanol; Odraedir; Hard Balls; Nomura	Metal Factory; Fat Bat; Torrax; Epidemy; The Pant; Steelfaith; T-A-K; Absolut Deafers; V.A.R.	Salieri; Rimortis; Roxor; Revoltons; Warning Vision; 100na100 Hand Grenade; April Weeps; Hamr	Symmerya; Hellpass; Forrest Jump; Hyperia; Loretta; Neurotic Machinery; Alžběta; Pavel Hanus; Godiva

=== 2023 ===
Masters of Rock 2023 was held from Thursday 13 July to Sunday 16 July.

Ronnie James Dio Stage
Thursday	Friday	Saturday	Sunday
Ironwill; Melodius Deite; NorthTale; April Art; Smash Into Pieces; Dymytry; Battle Beast; Sonata Arctica; Kreator; Crematory	Susurro; Dark Gamballe; Project Renegade; Venues; Brothers of Metal; Lord of the Lost; The Night Flight Orchestra; Phil Campbell and the Bastard Sons; Feuerschwanz; Tarja; Within Temptation; Soulfly	Free Fall; Saffek; Symfobia; Even Flow; Doga; Arion; Xandria; Angus McSix; Freedom Call; Airbourne; Europe; Bloodbound	Alia Tempora; Salamandra; Ad Infinitum; Dragony; Warkings; Legion of the Damned; Orden Ogan; The HU; Eluveitie; Amon Amarth

Second Stage
Thursday	Friday	Saturday	Sunday
Scabbard; Blax; Rosa Nocturna; Tinnitus; The Revolt; Purnama; Lunatic Gods; Donor; Pryor	Pefr Jam; Rissla; Vanaheim; Rebel; Carpatia Castle; Kapriola; Trilobit Rock; T.N.S. Hand Grenade	Alžběta; Rimortis; Roxor; Meat Mincer; Fat Bat; 100na100 Arawn; DanGar Six; Gloom	Eufory; Manual; Witch Hammer; Forrest Jump; Bastard; Argos; Nazgul; Chains of Sanity; Refore

=== 2022 ===
Masters of Rock 2022 was held from Thursday 7 July to Sunday 10 July.

Ronnie James Dio Stage
Thursday	Friday	Saturday	Sunday
Fleret; Sebastien; Mister Misery; Blues Pills; Beyond the Black; Amorphis; Citron; Lordi; Heaven Shall Burn; Sepultura	Forrest Jump; Andy Rocks; Neonfly; Amalgama; Black Sonic Pearls; Gotthard; Shakra; Pink Cream 69; Beast in Black; The Dead Daisies; Lacuna Coil	Nervosa; Trollfest; Civil War; Death Angel; High on Fire; Axxis; Alestorm; Gotthard; Judas Priest	Gate Crasher; Shiraz Lane; Long Distance Calling; Arakain; Visions of Atlantis + Bohemian Symphonic Orchestra Prague; Kataklysm; Exodus; Testament; Nightwish

Second Stage
Thursday	Friday	Saturday	Sunday
Snaefell; Scabbard; Vanguard; Tezaura; Sezarbil; Hard Balls; Perseus; Pryor	Alžběta; Vanaheim; Argos; Rimortis; Fat Bat; H.I.B. Five Ways to Nowhere; Hand Grenade; Kryptor	Manual; Pefr Jam; Toxic People; Roxor; Meat Mincer; Hamr; Menhir; Cerberos; Revoltons	Natřije; Shark; Solar System; Power 5 Salamandra; Revolvo; Hairy Groupies; Midnight Madness; Free Fall

=== 2021 ===
Cancelled - (COVID-19 pandemic) - the 18th edition of the festival has taken place from 7 to 10 July 2022.

=== 2020 ===
Cancelled - COVID-19 pandemic

=== 2019 ===
Masters of Rock 2019 was held from Thursday, 11 July to Sunday, 14 July.

Ronnie James Dio Stage
Thursday	Friday	Saturday	Sunday
Mayan; Cyhra; Xandria; Saltatio Mortis; Turilli / Lione Rhapsody; Delain; Gamma Ray; Eluveitie; Uriah Heep; Deathstars	Alia Tempora; Rhemorha; Twilight Force; Hardline; Battle Beast; Amaranthe; Dimmu Borgir; Avantasia; Equilibrium	Dark Gamballe; The Night Flight Orchestra; Tri State Corner; Follow the Cipher; Brainstorm; Legion of the Damned; Firewind; Rage; Satyricon; Tarja; Within Temptation; Soulfly	Symfobia; Serenity; Serious Black; Citron; Evergrey; Dark Tranquility; Primal Fear; Children of Bodom; Steel Panther; Dream Theater

FWcare Stage
Thursday	Friday	Saturday	Sunday
Scar Industry; Tezaura; Forrest Jump; Empire; Dark Seal; Mylions; Quattro Buggy; Scabbard; Perseus; Imortela	Atak; Rimortis; Hysteria; Argos; Hamr; Roxor; Hand Grenade; Onset; Get Away	Dangar Six; Stellfaith; Witch Hammer; Midnigt Madness; Pefr Jam; Eagleheart; Mr.Dynaboom; Booters; Kryptor	Sceletons; Helpness; Jaksi Taksi; Forrest Jump; Bastard; Ahard; Iron Soul; Anacreon; Bullet Holes

=== 2018 ===
Masters of Rock 2018 was held from Thursday, 12 July to Sunday, 15 July.

Ronnie James Dio Stage
Thursday	Friday	Saturday	Sunday
Diolegacy; Infected Rain; Gloryhammer; Sinner; Loudness; Van Canto; Annihilator; In Extremo; Powerwolf; Arkona	The New Roses; Dalriada; Tanja; Shakra; Dr. Living Dead; Nocturnal Rites; Avatarium; Turisas; Arch Enemy; Helloween; Amorphis	Gate Crasher; Dragony; Doga – 30 let Thobbe Englund; Bloodbound; The Unity; Kamelot; Avatar; Lordi; Dirkschneider; Die Apokalyptischen Reiter	Salamandra - 20 let Nervosa; Alkehol; SSOGE; Masterplan; Destruction; Orden Ogan; Doro; Korpiklaani; Gene Simmons

Rock Face Stage
Thursday	Friday	Saturday	Sunday
Gorilla Crash; April Weeps; Forrest Jump; Flowewhile; Calibos; Perseus; Tommy Poser; Pefr Jam; By the Way	Rimortis; DanGar Six; Lady Kate; Autobus; Ahard; Tlustá Berta; Alžběta; Butterfly Kiss; As They Rise	Eufory; Sotury; Sendwitch; Roxor; Libertate; Bullet Holes; Wait; Booters; Leisure	Menhir; Rissia; Eagleheart; Donor; Grog; Goc; Route to the Other Side; Hurrockaine

=== 2017 ===
Masters of Rock 2017 was held from Thursday, 13 July to Sunday, 16 July (SOLD OUT)

Ronnie James Dio Stage
Thursday	Friday	Saturday	Sunday
Fleret + Zuzana Šuláková; Brother Firetribe; The Charm The Fury; Majesty; Elvenking; Battle Beast; Death Angel; Stratovarius; Sabaton (with symphonic orchestra); Pain	Wind Rose; Heidevolk; Harlej; Visions of Atlantis; Dymytry; Anneke van Giersbergen VUUR; Bohemian Metal Rhapsody; Epica; Sepultura; Running Wild; Moonspell	Dark Gamballe; Follow the Cipher; C.O.P. UK; Serenity; Trollfest; Equilibrium; Almanac; Pretty Maids; Delain + Marko Hietala; Saxon; Kreator; Crematory	Motörgang; Tri State Corner; Iron Savior; Varg; Kreyson; Rage; Lacuna Coil; Dee Snider; Edguy; Vince Neil

Rock Face Stage
Thursday	Friday	Saturday	Sunday
Vadim Polke Blavy; Eagheart; Liberate; Fish Face; Ocelot; Wait; Komunal; Booters; Headfire	Split Bearing; Rimortis; Carpatia Castle; Sarkonia; Anacreon; Barebone; Jerem.I; Grog; Eufory	Tezaura; Stroy; Act of God; Quattro Buggy; Roxim Palace; Steel City Heroes; Rock N Roll Army; Forklift Elevator; Sendwith	Four Faces; Gate Crasher; Bastard; Forest Jump; Kapriola; Symfobia; Deathward; Five Ways to Nowhere; Folya

=== 2016 ===
Masters of Rock 2016 was held from Thursday, 14 July to Sunday, 17 July (SOLD OUT)

Ronnie James Dio Stage
Thursday	Friday	Saturday	Sunday
Rust; Škwor; Melechesh; Horkýže Slíže; Threshold; Kissin' Dynamite; Luca Turilli's Rhapsody; Testament; Apocalyptica; Rotting Christ	Sebastien; Zakázaný Ovoce; Salamandra; Doga; Avatarium; Waltari; Citron + Tanja; Amaranthe; Slayer; Avantasia; Korpiklaani	Forrest Jump; Bad Joker's Cream; Thundermother; Orden Ogan; Kadavar; Evergrey; The Dead Daisies; Primal Fear; The 69 Eyes; Eluveitie; Amon Amarth; Freedom Call	Proximity; Reds'Cool; Swallow the Sun; Alkehol; Brainstorm; Tublatanka; Oomph! Ensiferum; Airbourne; Tarja

Rock Face Stage
Thursday	Friday	Saturday	Sunday
Blant; Titan Crusher; Decolt; Anine Torment; Perseus; Ocelot; Wait; Booters; Komunál	Bastard; Rimortis; Autobus; Butterfly Kiss; Denoi; Lady Kate; Steel City; Mean Messiah; Modesty & Pride	Nahum; X-Ray; Tarverp; Party Animals; Kryptor; The Stzcky Fingers; Mad Frequency; Deathward; Overhype	Soustrast; Solar Systém; Power 5 Act of God; Kapriola; Anacreon; My Pulse; Prague Conspiracy; Symfobia

=== 2015 ===
Masters of Rock 2015 was held from Thursday, 9 July to Sunday, 12 July

Ronnie James Dio Stage
Thursday	Friday	Saturday	Sunday
Fleret; Free Fall; Xandria; Mercenary; The Gentle Storm; Kamelot; U.D.O. Within Temptation; Bloodbound	Embryo; Gate Crasher; Turbo; Anvil; Avatar; Serious Black; Gus G Dog Eat Dog; Legion of the Damned; HammerFall; Black Label Society; Septicflesh	The Agony; Six Degrees of Separation; Dymytry; Neonfly; Arakain; Crucified Barbara; Blues Pills; Delain; Krokus; Gotthard; Powerwolf; The Exploited	Hand Grenade; Dark Gamballe; Tri State Corner; Harlej; Lacrimas Profundere; Voodoo Circle; Arkona; Sonata Arctica; Gamma Ray; Nightwish

Alfedus Music Stage
Thursday	Friday	Saturday	Sunday
Titan Crusher; Tristana; Helpness; Perseus; Forrest Jump; Booters zakázanÝovoce; Ant Mafia	Cascabel; Carpatia Castle; T.H.L. Bad Joker's Cream; Ahard; Modesty & Pride; Black Bull; Blamage	Butterfly Kiss; The Sticky Fingers LTD. Lady Kate; My Pulse; Steel City; Cpt. Mendess & Rock N Roll Army; The Backroad Deals; Deathward	Stroy; Rimortis; CKB; Wishmasters; Hanz's Fuckers; Proximity; Loco Loco; Eleanor Gray

=== 2014 ===
Masters of Rock 2014 was held from Thursday, 10 July to Sunday, 13 July

Ronnie James Dio Stage
Thursday	Friday	Saturday	Sunday
Kreyson; Serenity; Russkaja; Axxis; Airbourne; Dream Theater; Anthrax; Stryper	Embryo; The Snuff; Gloryhammer; Doga; Visions of Atlantis; Die Happy; Rock Symphony; Korpiklaani; Epica; Sabaton; Behemoth	Six Degrees of Separation; Forrest Jump; Salamandra; Sebastien & Tony Martin; Suicidal Angels; Citron & Tanja; Grand Magus; Freedom Call; Michael Schenker's Temple of Rock; Arch Enemy; Helloween; Civil War	Black Widow; Cpt. Mendess & Rock N Roll Army; Legendy Se Vrací; Škwor; Kataklysm; Bonfire; Terrana; Eluveitie; Unisonic; Sebastian Bach

Alfedus Music Stage
Thursday	Friday	Saturday	Sunday
Inner Empire; Helpness; The Backroad Deals; Badmotorfinger; Caliber X Anime Torment; Slepí Křováci; Witch Hammer	Smola A Hrušky; Rimortis; Butterfly Kiss; Silent Session; Dolls in the Factory; X-Left to Die zakázanÝovoce; Bu-Fu	Tchoři; Motorfingers; Covers for Lovers; Ahard & Tanja; Lacrima; Holy Shire; Modesty & Pride; Five O'clock Tea	Booters; Aivn's Naked Trio; Bad Face; Tristana; Absolut Deafers; Free Fall; Hand Grenade; Dilated

=== 2013 ===
Masters of Rock 2013 was held from Thursday, 11 July to Sunday, 14 July

Ronnie James Dio Stage
Thursday	Friday	Saturday	Sunday
Fleret; Trollfest; Arkona; Primal Fear; Grave Digger; Leningrad Cowboys; Accept; DragonForce	Gate Crasher; Seven; Daniel Krob; Dark Gamballe; Neonfly; Elvenking; Audrey Horne; Prong; The 69 Eyes; Rage & Lingua Mortis Orch. Devin Townsend Project; Certain Death	Warhawk; NIL; Egotrip; S.S.O.G.E. Desmod; Amaranthe; Brainstorm; Waltari; Moonspell; Lordi; Yngwie Malmsteen; Masterplan	Debustrol; Dymytry; Emergency Gate; Harlej; Xandria; Sanctuary; Anneke van Giersbergen; Leaves' Eyes & Atrocity; Powerwolf; Avantasia

Alfedus Music Stage
Thursday	Friday	Saturday	Sunday
Komunál; Free Fall; Tibet; Power 5 Reverends; Hand Grenade; Monika Agrebi	Bank of Joe; Black Roll; Hypnotheticall; Good Girl Maggie; Rimortis; Caliber X Five O'Clock Tea; Absolut Deafers	Tchoři; Silent Session; Herkules; Sinezamia; The Snuff; Twintera; Anime Torment; Stonnard	Soustrast; Solar System; NoID; Evelynne; Seventh Veil; Aivn's Naked Trio; Overhype

=== 2012 ===
Masters of Rock 2012 was held from Thursday, 12 July to Sunday, 15 July

Ronnie James Dio Stage
Thursday	Friday	Saturday	Sunday
Skyline; Legendy se vrací Saltatio Mortis; The Sorrow; Horkýže Slíže; Kamelot; Thin Lizzy; Within Temptation; Bloodbound	ZakázanÝ ovoce Ribozyme; Suicidal Angels; Vitacit; Visací zámek Sirenia; Freedom Call; Exodus; Unisonic; Edguy; Pain	Lady Kate; Odium; Sebastien (feat. Roland Grapow and Apollo Papathanasio); Milking the Goatmachine; Kissin´Dynamite; Arakain and Lucie Bílá; Firewind; Korpiklaani; Stratovarius; Nightwish; Deathstars	Mistake; Salamandra; Škwor; Skyforger; Doga; Hell; Paul Di'Anno; Tiamat; Gotthard; Arch Enemy; Sabaton

Alfedus Music Stage
Thursday	Friday	Saturday	Sunday
ATD; Porta Inferi; Miss God; Personal Signet; Mad Frequency; Hand Grenade; Metropolis	Traktor; Neonfly; Abax; Rimortis; Dying Passion; S.E.X. Department; Anime Torment	Tristana; Archontes; Bad Face; Chaos in Head; Checkpoint; Reverends; Absolut Deafers	Hentai Corporation; Eagleheart; Blamage; Remains of Force; Scelet; Dragon's Eye; Monika Agrebi se Seven

=== 2011 ===
Masters of Rock 2011 was held from Thursday, 14 July to Sunday, 17 July

Ronnie James Dio Stage
Thursday	Friday	Saturday	Sunday
Skyline; Fleret; Konflikt; Alestorm; Virgin Steele; Bonfire; Amorphis; Finntroll + Eluveitie and Pagan Alliance; HammerFall; Moonspell	Nil; Tleskač; Dark Gamballe; Alkehol; Varg; Silent Stream of Godless Elegy; Sirenia; Ektomorf; Rhapsody of Fire; Twisted Sister; Airbourne; Watain	Crash Road; Jiří Schmitzer & Band; Audrey Horne; Visions of Atlantis; Powerwolf; Seven (feat. Blaze Bayley, Victor Smolski, and Schmier); Kreyson; Legion of the Damned; Ross the Boss; Victor Smolski workshop U.D.O. Guano Apes; Brainstorm	Dymytry; Törr; Steelwing; Mercenary; Evile; Arkona; Delain; Oomph! Overkill; Helloween; Tři sestry

Coca-Cola Stage
Thursday	Friday	Saturday	Sunday
Horská Chata; Empire; Hysteria; Ahard; Airfare; Tristana; Gate Crasher	Jackye; Garant; Porta Inferi; ZakázanÝ ovoce Five O'Clock Tea; Menhir; Unsouled	Neutral; Hand Grenade; K2; Second Chance xXXx; Free Fall; Six Degrees of Separation	Hellstrike; Black Bull; Votchi; Dirty Blondes; Segment; Memoria; Pussy Sisster

=== 2010 ===
Masters of Rock 2010 was held from Thursday, 15 July to Sunday, 18 July

Ronnie James Dio Stage
Thursday	Friday	Saturday	Sunday
Final Fiction; Gaia Mesiah; Salamandra; Horkýže Slíže; K2; Axel Rudi Pell; Tarja + Bohuslav Martinů Philharmonic Orchestra; Mike Terrana; Sabaton	Citron; Visací zámek Metalforce; Delain; Destruction; Tublatanka; Epica; Queensrÿche; Manowar; HolyHell	Rising Dream; Grand Magus; Legendy se vrací Dodo; Škwor; Doga; Communic; Behemoth; Primal Fear; Annihilator; Gamma Ray; Bloodbound	Euthanasia; Rhemorha; Kimaera; Harlej; Callejon; Arakain; Lacrimosa; Doro; Unisonic; Accept; Lordi

Coca-Cola Stage
Thursday	Friday	Saturday	Sunday
Vítěz soutěže Živák; Soulsick; Chaos in Head; Snovonne; Dymytry; Bethrayer	Shockwave; Dirty Game; Gate Crasher; Eagleheart; Psycho Radio; Endless	Filthy Minds; Shatoon; Second Chance; FDK; Unzucht; Symphonity; Silent Stream of Godless Elegy	Crate; Krleš; Power 5 Forgotten Silence; Six Degrees of Separation; Dying Passion; Free Fall

=== 2009 ===
Masters of Rock 2009 was held from Thursday, 9 July to Sunday, 12 July

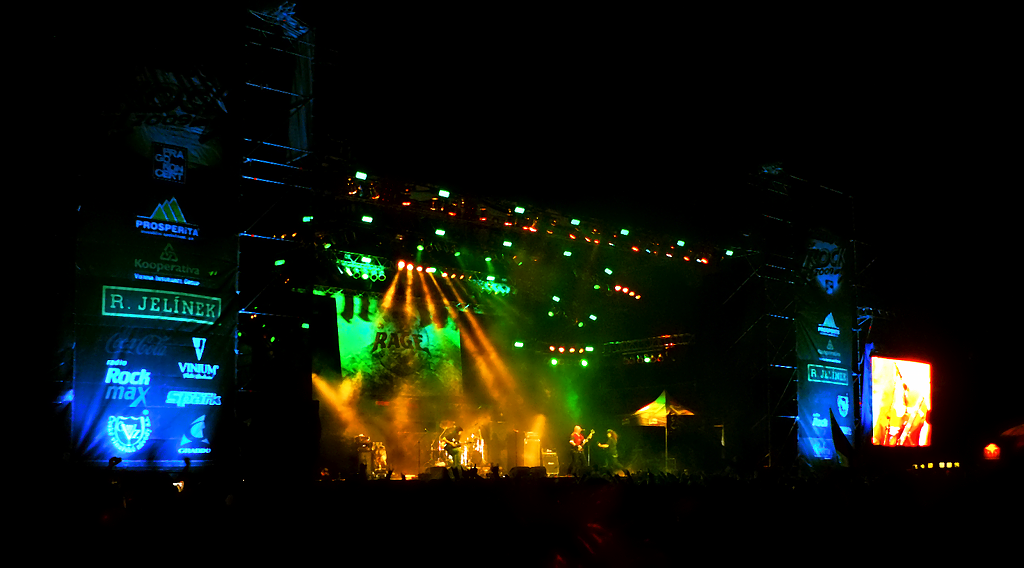
Rage on Masters of Rock 2009 in Vizovice

Main Stage
Thursday	Friday	Saturday	Sunday
Bethrayer; Nil; Fleret; Vypsaná Fixa; In Extremo; Rage; Nightwish; Shaman + orchestra	Callejon; Blowsight; Keep of Kalessin; Kreyson; Death Angel; Kataklysm; Korpiklaani; DragonForce; Edguy; Deathstars	Gate Crasher; Grand Magus; Už jsme doma Kissin´Dynamite; Mňága a Žďorp; Legion of the Damned; The Sorrow; Axxis; Crucified Barbara; Evergrey; Stratovarius; Blind Guardian; Tiamat	Innocens; Interitus; Audrey Horne; Eluveitie; Tleskač; Schandmaul; Heaven Shall Burn; Die Happy; Voivod; Arch Enemy; Europe

Coca-Cola Stage
Thursday	Friday	Saturday	Sunday
Seven; Six Degrees of Separation; Shockwave	Bed Sores; X-Left to Die; Evarest	Dying Passion; Endless; Crashpoint	Free Fall; Memoria; Street Machine

=== 2008 ===
Masters of Rock 2008 was held from Thursday, 10 July to Sunday, 13 July

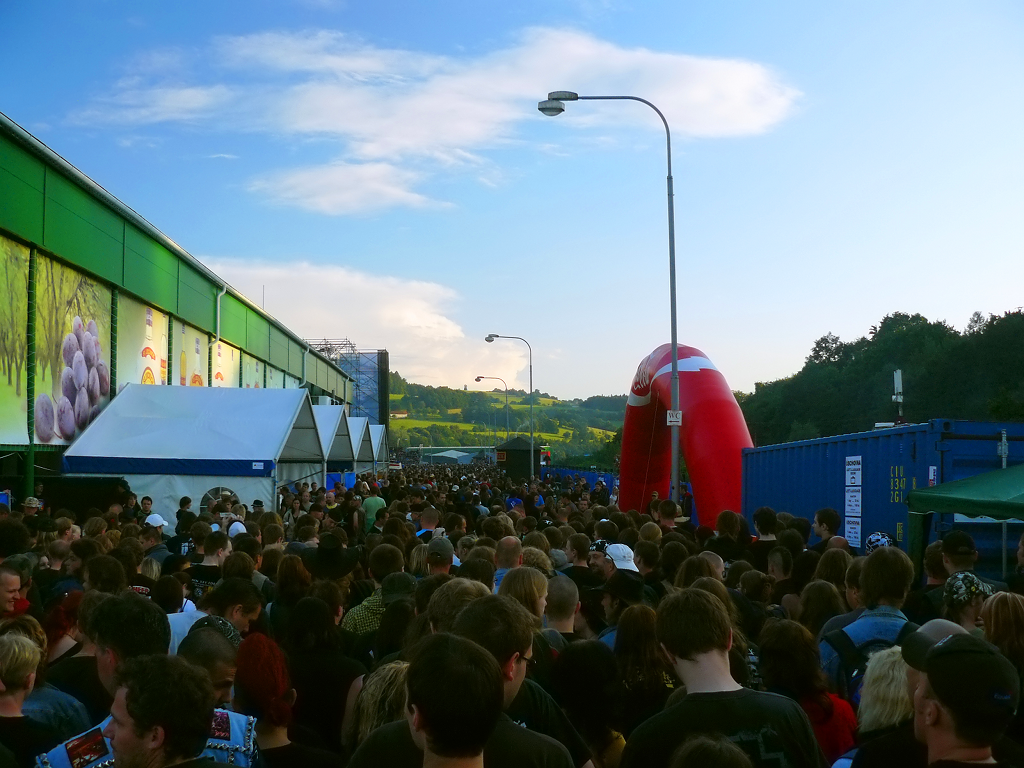
Masters of Rock entrance

Thursday	Friday	Saturday	Sunday
Rattle Bucket; Doga; Sirenia; Korpiklaani; Ministry; Def Leppard; Avantasia	Komunální Odpad; Totální Nasazení; Jaksi Taksi; Dying Passion; Dark Gamballe; Fourever; Engel; The Sorrow; Haggard; Sabaton; Annihilator; Oomph! Moonspell	Existence; Salamandra; KJU: Alestorm; Horkýže Slíže; Stormwarrior; Tristania; Brainstorm; Arakain + Plzeň Philharmonic; Amon Amarth; Apocalyptica; My Dying Bride	Power 5 E!E; Nil; Bloodbound; Communic; Volbeat; Gotthard; Sonata Arctica; Within Temptation; Die Apokalyptischen Reiter

=== 2007 ===
Masters of Rock 2007 was held from Thursday, 12 July to Sunday, 15 July

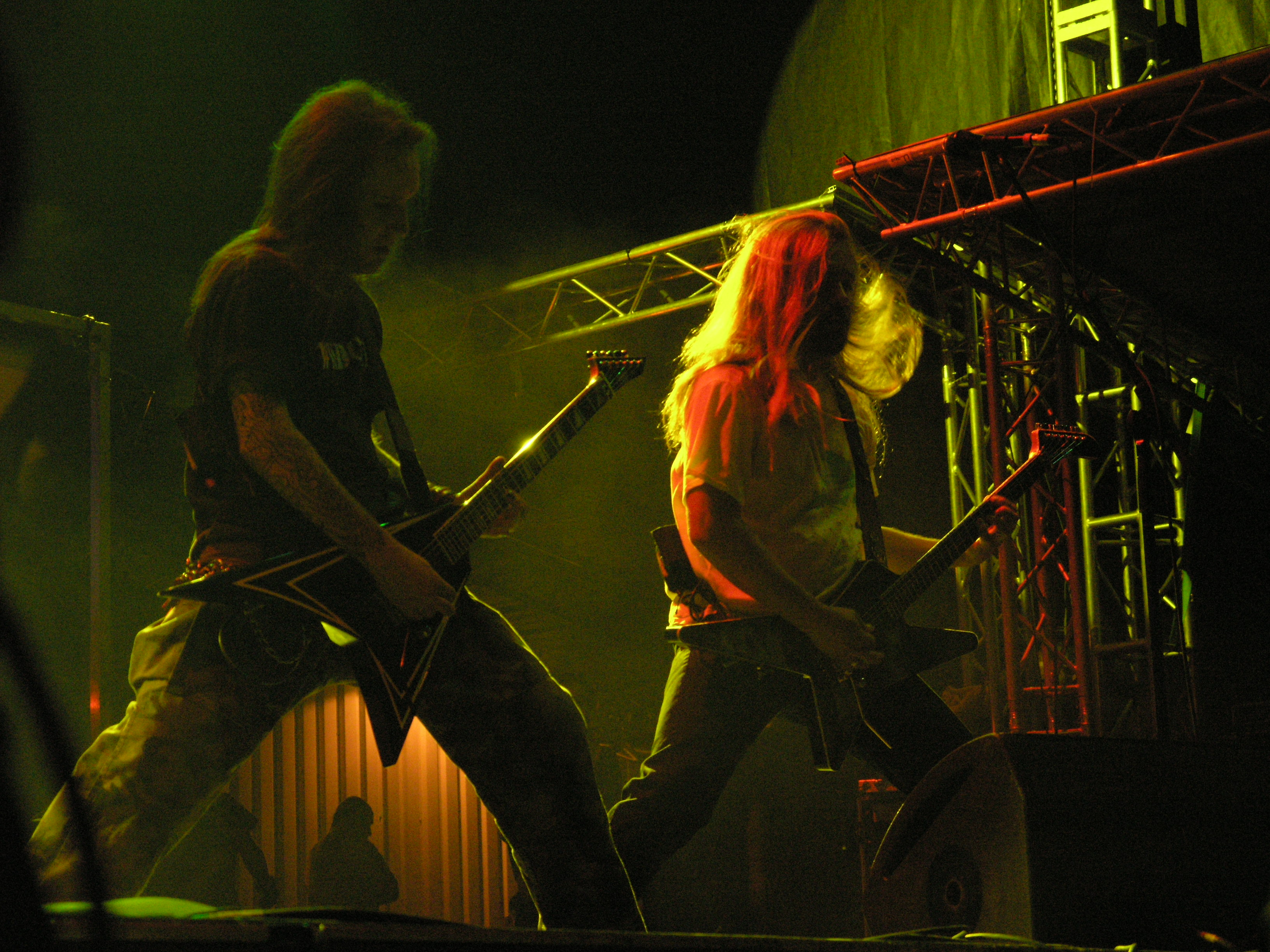
Children of Bodom live at 2007's Masters of Rock

Thursday	Friday	Saturday	Sunday
Six Degrees of Separation; 2Wings; Fleret + Jarmilka; Hevein; Týr; Die Happy; Rage + Orchestra; Vypsaná fixa Finntroll	Free Fall; Fourth Face; Törr; SPS; The Tommys; Tleskač; Norther; Uriah Heep; Motörhead	Dirty Game; Interitus; Post-it; Debustrol; Rising Dreams; SSOGE; Sham 69; Epica; Thunder; Stratovarius; Children of Bodom; In Extremo	X-Core; Lety mimo Memoria; Virgin Snatch; Cocotte Minute; Rasta; Visions of Atlantis; Sabaton; Divokej Bill; Pink Cream 69; HammerFall; Sepultura

=== 2006 ===
Masters of Rock 2006 was held from Thursday, 13 July to Sunday, 16 July

Thursday	Friday	Saturday	Sunday
Egotrip; Fleret; Svatý Pluk; SSOGE	Wave; Flood; Cobalto; Harmful; Wohnout; Horkýže Slíže; Tamoto; Kreator; The Gathering; Whitesnake; Masterplan	Pangea; N.V.Ú. Jaksi Taksi; KJU: Dark Gamballe; Mike Terrana - Drumclinic; Charon; Leaves' Eyes; Crucified Barbara; Evergrey; Gamma Ray; Helloween; Rage	HazyDecay; E!E; Doctor PP; Tleskač; Škwor; Mňága a Žďorp; End of Green; Metal Church; Riverside; Korpiklaani; Tři Sestry; Edguy; Within Temptation

=== 2005 ===
Masters of Rock 2005 was held from Friday, 15 July to Sunday, 17 July

Friday	Saturday	Sunday
Dark Gamballe; Lenka Dusilová; Vypsaná Fixa; Chinaski; Rage; Edguy; Nightwish; Subway to Sally	Checkpoint; Jaksi Taksi; Shaark; Silent Stream of Godless Elegy; Lord Bishop; KJU: Uniklubi; Kurtizány z 25. avenue Skarface; Die Happy; Holyhell; Rhapsody; Manowar; Desmod	Interitus; Insania; NVÚ; Doctor PP; SPS; Southpaw; Tleskač; Plexis; Ratos de Porao; Wohnout; Divokej Bill; Tři Sestry; Sweet; HammerFall; Waltari

=== 2004 ===
Masters of Rock 2004 was held from Friday, 2 July to Sunday, 4 July

Friday	Saturday	Sunday
Fleret; Ready Kirken; Vypsaná Fixa; Wohnout; Pink Cream 69; The 69 Eyes; J.A.R. Kiss Forever Band	Lament; Master; Power 5 Gaia Mesiah; Doktor PP; E!E; Visions of Atlantis; KJU: Divokej Bill; Kurtizány z 25. avenue Tři Sestry; Europe; Stratovarius	Žirafa; Kryptor; Grexabat; Painamp; The Chancers; Horkýže Slíže; Die Happy; Olympic; Helloween; In Extremo

=== 2003 ===
Masters of Rock 2003 was held from Friday, 27 June to Saturday, 28 June

Friday	Saturday
Rammstein Member´s Club; Garage; Visací zámek Krucipüsk; Support Lesbiens; HIM; Overkill; Prong	Lety mimo Vypsaná fixa Rumpál; Staří psi Už jsme doma Mňága a Žďorp; Kurtizány z 25. avenue Wohnout; Kryštof; Die Happy; Slade; HammerFall; Tisíc let od ráje
