= Lick It Up (disambiguation) =

- Lick It Up is a 1983 album by the American hard rock band Kiss.

Lick It Up may also refer to:

- "Lick It Up" (song), the title track of the Kiss album
- Lick It Up – A Millennium Tribute to Kiss, a 2008 Kiss tribute album
- "Lick It Up", a song by Deep Purple from their 1993 album The Battle Rages On
