= In Distortion We Trust =

Studio album by Crucified Barbara
- Released: January 19, 2005
- Recorded: Early 2004
- Genre: Hard rock, heavy metal, thrash metal
- Length: 38:21
- Label: GMR Music Group
- Producer: Mankan Sedenberg

Crucified Barbara chronology
| In Distortion We Trust (2005) | 'Til Death Do Us Party (2009) |

Professional ratings
Review scores
| Source | Rating |
|---|---|
| Allmusic | 2.5/5 stars |

In Distortion We Trust is the first album by Swedish band Crucified Barbara. It was first released in Sweden in 2005.

== History ==
It was recorded in PAMA Studios/Blakk Records in Kristianopel in Sweden and produced and engineered by Mankan Sedenberg. The recordings were finished, mixed and mastered at the beginning of summer. The first single, "Losing the Game," and the accompanying video were released in December.

== Track listing ==
| No. | Title | Length |
|---|---|---|
| 1. | "Play Me Hard" | 3:35 |
| 2. | "In Distortion We Trust" | 3:45 |
| 3. | "Losing the Game" | 3:52 |
| 4. | "Motorfucker" | 3:40 |
| 5. | "I Need a Cowboy from Hell" | 3:29 |
| 6. | "My Heart Is Black" | 3:33 |
| 7. | "Hide 'Em All" | 3:35 |
| 8. | "Going Down" | 2:52 |
| 9. | "I Wet Myself" | 3:06 |
| 10. | "Rock 'n' Roll Bachelor" | 3:08 |
| 11. | "Bad Hangover" | 3:46 |
| Total length: | | 38:21 |

Digipack Bonus Tracks
| No. | Title | Length |
|---|---|---|
| 12. | "My Heart Is Black" (Acoustic) | 5:04 |
| 13. | "Killed By Death" (Motörhead cover) | 3:57 |
| 14. | "Shout It Out Loud" (Kiss cover) | 3:18 |
| Total length: | | 50:40 |
