= Marco Mendess =

Italian musician

- Also known as: Cpt. Mendess
- Born: 10 November 1978 (age 46); Caorle, Italy
- Genres: Hard rock, heavy metal, glam rock
- Occupation(s): Musician, singer-songwriter, producer
- Instrument(s): Vocals, guitar, bass guitar, drums, piano
- Years active: 2004–present
- Labels: Perris Records, Supraphon

Marco Mendess is an Italian multi-instrumentalist, singer and music producer, who has released a number of band and solo albums since 2005. Born on 10 November 1978 in Caorle, Italy, after his studies at the Liceo Classico in Portogruaro and the experience in the Italian navy, Coast Guard, he left Italy in 2001 and devoted himself entirely to his musical projects living and working in Holland, the United States, Czech Republic and Sweden.

== Hollywood Vampires, S.E.X. Department ==
Marco Mendess' first project was the glam rock band Hollywood Vampires. Born in Venice, their opening CD Night Club 666. was recorded in Miloš DoDo Doležal's Hacienda recording studio, and was released in 2005 under the Supraphon - Popron music label in Czech Republic. The video clip for the single "No way to Pussycat" was placed on 69th position in the Czech music award Anděl for 2005.

In 2007 the band landed second in the Bodog Music Battle finals in the Melkweg club, Amsterdam and moved for a period to the Netherlands, where they obtained the promotional contract.

The band in 2007 changed name from Hollywood Vampires to S.E.X. Department.

Marco Mendess' heavy metal project under the new name S.E.X. Department comes out with the debut album S.E.X. Department in 2007 under Perris Records, Texas label.

The same record company places their single Call me baby call me on their annual Hollywood Hairspray vol.7 compilation and the song No way to pussycat on Perris Worldwide Network compilation.

After the release of the self titled album, that received rave reviews in the actual glam scene, the band leaves in 2008 for an American coast to coast tour, from New York to Los Angeles, touching with its shows the Rocklahoma festival, South Texas Rock Fest in San Antonio, The Cat Club and the Whisky a Go Go in West Hollywood. In the Whisky a Go Go Club the band played at the annual Cruefest Hollywood event, organized by the fans of the Mötley Crüe, to raise money for medical research in the memory of Skylar Neil.

Mendess' songs Revenge of Vampires and Drive me insane chosen by Versailles Records for the compilation Lick it up - A millennium tribute to Kiss, featuring former members of Skid Row, Deep Purple, Alice Cooper Band and White Lion, are part of the bonus CD entitled Strip Club Rock.

In 2009 Marco Mendess collaborated on a new album with Pedro Ferreira, Brit award music producer of the band The Darkness. The album was recorded by Chapel Studios in Lincolnshire, UK, but this album will never be released by decision of Mendess himself.

The same year the new album was released with the name Rock N Roll Suicide under Perris records.

In 2009 Marco Mendess moved to Los Angeles, on the Sunset strip, to rebuild his band there with American musicians.

In 2010 he then moved to Sweden to work on the new album with Finnish producer Ilkka Wirtanen. From this partnership comes out a double record, Rock N Roll SS and Italiani with hard rock songs in Italian.

== Rock N Roll Army ==
After a serious health problem that even causes the singer to suffer months of total blindness, resolved by an eye surgery, Marco Mendess returns as Captain Mendess with his new Rock N Roll Army project

In 2014 he plays on the Ronnie James Dio stage on the Masters of Rock festival in Czech Republic, sharing the stage with Dream Theater, Arch Enemy and Helloween. He took part to the same festival also in 2015 and 2017.

In 2016 the five-episode series on Marco Mendess' musical and non-musical adventures was released under the name Backstage - The true story of Rock'n'Roll

In 2018 was confirmed the participation of Cpt. Mendess and his Rock N Roll Army at the 32nd edition of the Italian music competition, Sanremo Rock

The same year Marco Mendess takes part in the TV show Československo má talent broadcast on Prima TV (Czech Republic) and TV Joj (Slovakia). With the song Don't you treat me bad, Rock N Roll Army ranks to the final.

In 2015 is published in Italian the book Prostitute, prostituti, prostituti by Feltrinelli, written by Petra Klabouchova about Mendess from his childhood to tragic family events.

In November 2019 is published in Czech the book Appetite for Destruction and in April 2023 the book Na plný koule by Petra Klabouchová which narrates in comic style all the rock adventures around the world of Captain Mendess and his bands.

In 2020 Marco Mendess comes out with the single The Captain of Rock ’n’ Roll, which is completely recorded, mixed and mastered by himself.

Songs Don't ya treat me bad ( 2021 ) and Terror Training ( 2021 ) are entirely created by Captain Mendess, in his new music style called black boogie, conceived by himself. "It's black colored Boogie Woogie, when classic Rock n Roll meets Heavy Metal and turns into Rockabilly for vampires."

== Discography ==
=== Albums with Hollywood Vampires ===
- Night Club 666 (Popron Music, 2005)

=== Albums with S.E.X. Department ===
- S.E.X. Department (Perris, 2007)
- Rock N Roll Suicide (Perris, 2009)
- Rock N Roll SS (2011) – digital release
- Italiani (2011) – digital release

=== Albums with Rock N Roll Army ===
- The Captain of Rock N Roll (2020) – digital release
- Don't ya treat me bad (2021) – digital release
- Terror Training (2021) – digital release

=== Contributions to compilation albums ===
- Hollywood Hairspray vol. 7 (Perris, 2007)
- Perris Worldwide Network (Perris, 2007)
- Lick It Up – A Millennium Tribute to Kiss - Strip Club Rock ( 2008, Versailles records )
