= Follow the Cipher (album) =

Studio album by Follow the Cipher
- Released: 11 May 2018
- Recorded: 2017
- Genre: Power metal; symphonic metal; electropop
- Length: 45:17
- Label: Nuclear Blast

Professional ratings
Review scores
| Source | Rating |
|---|---|
| Sonic Perspectives | 7.5/10 |

Follow the Cipher is the self-titled debut studio album by Swedish symphonic power metal band Follow the Cipher, released on 11 May 2018 via Nuclear Blast Records. A lyric video was released for the song "The Rising". The cover artwork was unveiled on 15 February 2018. The album includes a cover of "Carolus Rex", a song guitarist Ken Kängström co-wrote with Sabaton.

== Track listing ==
1. "Enter the Cipher" – 5:20
2. "Valkyria" – 3:20
3. "My Soldier" – 4:19
4. "Winterfall" – 3:39
5. "Titan's Call" – 3:35
6. "The Rising" – 3:41
7. "A Mind's Escape" – 4:09
8. "Play with Fire" – 4:27
9. "I Revive" – 3:15
10. "Starlight" – 4:48
11. "Carolus Rex" (Sabaton cover) – 4:44

Note: Some editions have the 35-second intro of "My Soldier" embedded to the end of "Valkyria".

== Personnel ==
- Linda Toni Grahn – lead vocals
- Viktor Carlsson – guitars, co-lead vocals
- Ken Kängström – guitars
- Jonas Asplind – bass
- Karl Löfgren – drums
