= Alia Tempora =

Czech heavy metal band

- Origin: Brno, Czech Republic
- Genres: Symphonic metal, electronic metal; electronic rock; dubstep
- Years active: 2012–present
- Labels: Smile Music Records
- Members: Markéta Morávková; Štěpán Řezníček; Mario del Rio; Marek Brázdil; Roman Škrabal
- Website: aliatempora.com

Alia Tempora is a Czech music group formed in 2012 in Brno that blends modern metal with elements of electronic music, dubstep, and pop. They have performed at major festivals such as Masters of Rock and Metalfest and toured across Europe, the United Kingdom, and Latin America.

The band is fronted by vocalist Markie Morávková, the daughter of Miloš Morávek, guitarist of Progres 2, among other bands. Alia Tempora also includes Mexican guitarist Mario Del Rio, who, after several years as a guest musician became a permanent member in 2023.

== History ==
Alia Tempora was formed by Markie Morávková and Štěpán Řezníček in 2012 in Brno. Their first single, "Frozen", was released in 2013 and in November 2015, the band issued their debut album, titled Digital Cube, featuring Dutch guitarist Timo Somers, formerly of the symphonic metal band Delain. The album was supported by a successful crowdfunding campaign as well as by the city of Brno. Gustavo Sazes, famous for designing album covers for bands such as Amaranthe and Arch Enemy, created the artwork for Digital Cube. The song "Mockingjay" was inspired by the movie Hunger Games.

In 2018, Alia Tempora supported Swedish act Amaranthe on their Baltic tour of Latvia, Lithuania, and Estonia.

The group released their second album, Dragonfly Effect, on 21 September 2019 and introduced it at the Masters of Rock Ronnie James Dio Stage, where they also recorded a music video for the song "Loser Like Me". The album again includes a collaboration with Timo Somers.

During their 2019 Mexican tour, Alia Tempora were invited as official guests to the Lunas del Auditorio music awards. While in Mexico, the band filmed a music video for the Spanish song "Por Siempre", with locations including Teotihuacan and Playa Diamante in Acapulco; it was released in 2021.

In 2023, the band released their third album, Prismatica, at the Masters of Rock festival. It featured guest guitarists Ruud Jolie (Within Temptation) and Timo Somers.

The same year, Morávková and Del Rio joined Joel Hoekstra and Brandon Gibbs on a tour across the United Kingdom and Ireland.

== Band members ==
- Markéta Morávková – clean vocals
- Štěpán Řezníček – guitar, growling vocals
- Mario del Rio – guitar, growling vocals
- Roman Škrabal – bass
- Marek Brázdil – drums

== Discography ==
- Digital Cube (2015)
- Dragonfly Effect (2019)
- Prismatica (2023)
