= The Midnight Chase =

Studio album by Crucified Barbara
- Released: May 23, 2012 (Japan); May 28, 2012 (Europe)
- Studio: Music-A-Matic Studio
- Genre: Hard rock, heavy metal, thrash metal
- Length: 45:25
- Label: GMR Music Group
- Producer: Chips Kiesby

Crucified Barbara chronology
'Til Death Do Us Party (2009)	The Midnight Chase (2012)	In The Red (2014)

The Midnight Chase is the third album by Swedish hard rock band Crucified Barbara. It was first released in Japan and Europe in 2012.

== Track listing ==
No.	Title	Length
1.	"The Crucifier"	3:27
2.	"Shut Your Mouth"	4:04
3.	"Into the Fire"	3:40
4.	"Rules and Bones"	4:46
5.	"Everything We Need"	3:17
6.	"If I Hide"	4:23
7.	"Rock Me Like the Devil"	3:45
8.	"Kid from the Upperclass"	4:05
9.	"The Midnight Chase"	4:04
10.	"Count Me In"	5:00
11.	"Rise and Shine"	4:54
Total length:		45:25

Bonus Track
No.	Title	Length
12.	"Acid Rain"	3:42
Total length:		49:07

Japan Edition
No.	Title	Length
12.	"Miss Sunshine"	4:10
13.	"Heaven or Hell"	3:01
Total length:		52:36
