= Sinezamia =

- Origin: Mantua, Italy
- Genres: New wave, hard rock, alternative rock
- Years active: 2004–present
- Labels: Sinezamia Records
- Website: www.sinezamia.it

Sinezamia is an Italian rock band formed in Mantua in 2004.

== History ==
Sinezamia started playing in 2004, and from 2007 onward they have released two EPs: the self-produced Fronde in 2007, and Sacralità in 2009

Personal life experiences and existentialism are the major aspects of Sinezamia's lyrics, written in Italian. Sinezamia's initial musical style was rooted in dark wave, new wave and Italian rock music from the '80s.

In 2011 the band released the single "Ombra" followed by, in 2012, their first album, La fuga, self-produced and promoted by Atomic Stuff, a record label from Brescia. After publishing the album and moving its musical genre towards hard rock, dark and metal, the band started gaining several reviews by some music magazines such as the well-known Italian Rockerilla and Rockit, and foreign publications like Rock Hard and Metal Mania.

In 2013, the band performed at the Masters of Rock festival in Czech Republic.

That October, Sinezamia published the single "Senza fiato", produced by Atomic Stuff.

Sinezamia took part i the Joy Division tribute compilation 3.5 Decades – A Joy Division Italian Tribute, playing Warsaw, produced by the Darkitalia community. This was scheduled for release on 15 June 2014.

While the band was composing a new album, on 13 March 2015 they released the live album Decadanza, containing ten songs and celebrating the first ten years of the band.

Sinezamia took part in the Litfiba tribute compilation 30 Desaparecido playing Versante est produced by the Ghigo Renzulli Fan Collaborative community. It was scheduled for release on 29 December 2015.

22 April 2017, on the occasion of Record Store Day, the band released the new single "Nel blu", preview of the new album.

On 11 July 2019 the band released their second album, Fingere di essere, promoted by a video clip recorded at the historic headquarters of the Bugatti car manufacturer.

On 18 April 2020, during the quarantine period linked to the coronavirus emergency, the band released the single "Atmosphere" in digital format, a reinterpretation of the historic Joy Division song.

After 3 years of silence, in Autumn 2023 the band makes their return official with a new rhythm section and announcing that they have already been working for months on various unreleased material.

On October 18, 2024, the new single "Vanità" was released, a preview of their third album of unreleased tracks, "Distanze," released on December 13. The album received excellent reviews from the music press, including Rockerilla, Rock Hard, RockIt, and Buscadero, and was immediately acclaimed by fans who embraced the return to a more wave-oriented sound.

In March 2025, they released a celebratory version of the song "Danza sull'acqua," originally from their first EP "Fronde" in 2007.

On February 6, 2026, While the band records new material for their upcoming album, the single "Freddo" is released, distributed by Sorry Mom! The band is also releasing a limited-edition CD version, which includes two previously unreleased bonus tracks.

== Members ==
- Marco Grazzi – voice (2004–present)
- Carlo Enrico Scaietta – keyboards (2004–present)
- Alessandro Conte – guitar (2018–present)
- Saverio Coizzi – drums (2022–present)
- Luca Losio – bass guitar (2023–present)

== Ex members ==
- Marco Beccari – bass guitar (2008–2022)
- Stefano Morbini – drum (2011–2022)
- Federico Bonazzoli – guitar (2009-2018)
- Marco Bardiani - guitar (2006-2009)
- Davide Fantuzzi – drum (2008-2009)
- Claudio Mori – drum (2004-2008; 2010)
- Simone Mori – bass guitar (2006-2008); guitar (2004)
- Fabio Fera – guitar (2005-2006)

== Discography ==
=== EPs ===
- 2007 – Fronde (self-produced)
- 2009 – Sacralità (self-produced)

=== Singles ===
- 2011 – Ombra (self-produced)
- 2013 – Senza fiato (Atomic Stuff)
- 2017 – Nel blu (self-produced)
- 2020 – Atmosphere (self-produced-digital)
- 2026 – Freddo (self-produced)

=== Albums ===
- 2012 – La fuga (self-produced)
- 2019 – Fingere di essere (Sliptrick Records)
- 2024 – Distanze (self-produced)

=== Live ===
- 2015 – Decadanza (self-produced)

=== Compilation ===
- 2014 – 3.5 Decades – A Joy Division Italian Tribute (Darkitalia) with Warsaw
- 2015 – 30 Desaparecido (Ghigo Renzulli Fan Collaborative) with Versante est
