= Salamandra (band) =

Czech speed metal band

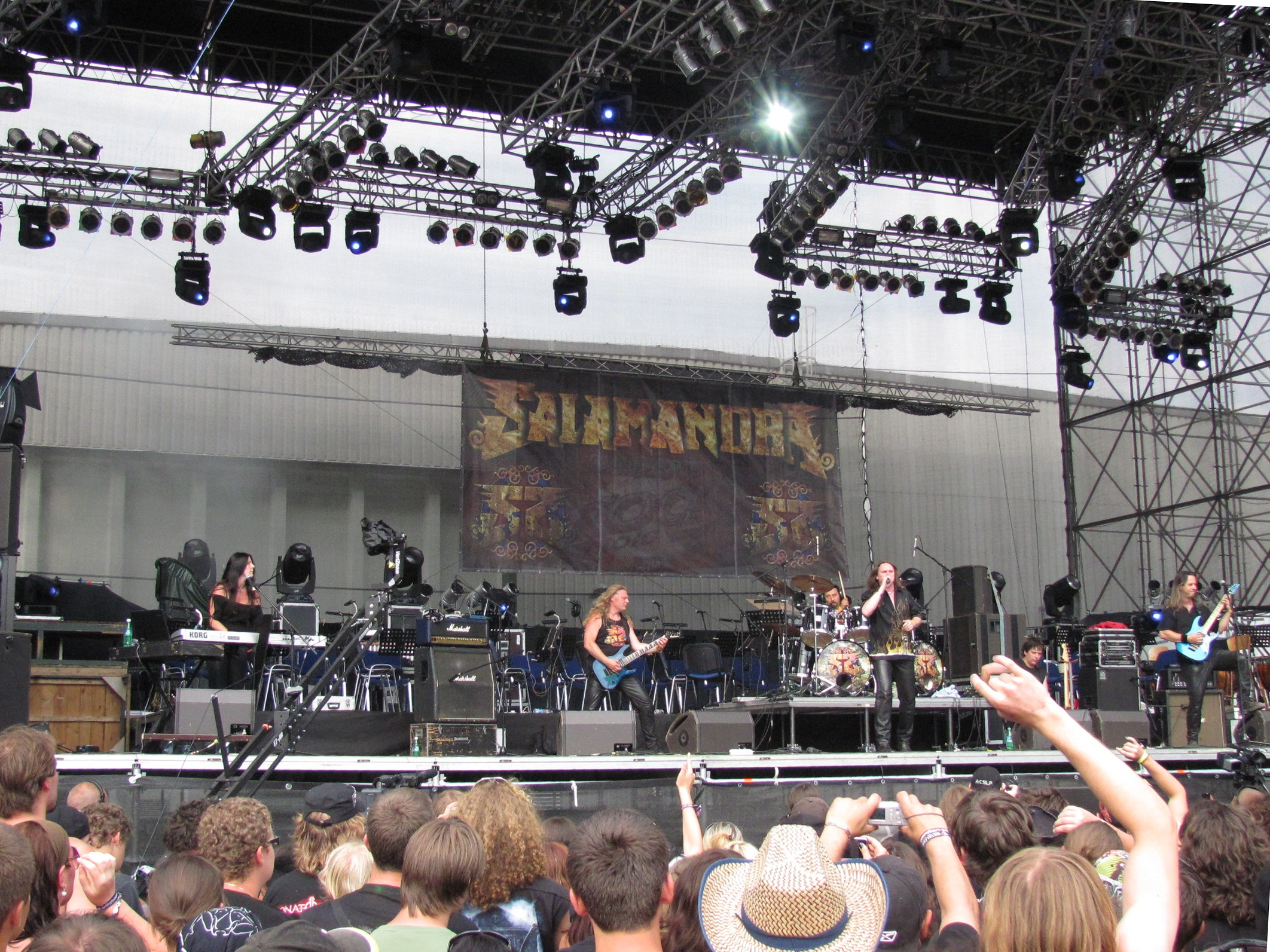
- Live concert (Masters of Rock 2010)

Background information
- Origin: Ostrava, Czech Republic
- Genres: Speed metal
- Years active: 1998 - present
- Label: Leviathan Records
- Members: Ivan Borovský; Pavel Slíva; Karel Řepecký; Jaroslav "Pišta" Sedláček; Hanka Šlachtová; Dan "Baalberith" Jureček
- Past members: Dalibor "Panther" Halamíček; Jaromir Dufek; Marek Lankočí; Lukáš Homolka; Aleš Klimša
- Website: Official Site

Salamandra is a Czech speed metal band formed in 1998 in Ostrava. Originally formed by guitarist Pavel Slíva.

== History ==
Pavel Slíva formed his band in October 1998 when he prepared a first album called Twilight Of Legends, with Dalibor "Panther" Halamíček on vocals, Karel Řepecký on guitars, Marek Lankočí on keyboards, Aleš Klimša on bass and automatic drummer was recorded the debut CD in Citron studio. After its release came Dan "Baalberith" Jureček on drums and Jaroslav Dufek on bass in place of Aleš Klimša. Then there was Salamandra request by Helloween fanclub to contribute to a tribute CD of this legend. The band recorded the song "Judas." The next album, Skarremar, was released in 2000, featuring references to the Middle Ages, ancient heroes, kings and queens. After many tours until 2004, Salamandra came with new melodic speed album Great Moravian Elegies. In 2005, was created new line-up with Ivan Borovský on vocals and Jaroslav "Pišta" Sedláček on bass. This band recorded the album Faces Of Chimera in 2007.

== Band members ==
=== Current members ===
- Tomáš Hradil - lead vocals (2022–present)
- Pavel Slíva - guitars (1998–present)
- Pavel Novotný - guitars (2022–present)
- Hanka Šlachtová - keyboards, vocals (2002–present)
- Jaromir Dufek - bass (1998–2005),(2025-present)
- Arek Tomaszewski - drums (2025–present)

=== Former members ===
- Jiří Gadula - drums (2022–2024)
- Patrik Hrnčíř - bass (2022–2024)
- Václav Moch - guitars (2011–2022)
- Dan "Baalberith" Jureček - drums (1998–2021)
- Ivan Borovský - lead vocals (2004–2013),(2014-2021)
- Jan Bernátek - lead vocals (2013–2014)
- Dalibor "Panther" Halamíček - lead vocals (1998–2004)
- Marek Lankočí - keyboards (1998–2001)
- Lukáš Homolka - keyboards (2001–2002)
- Aleš Klimša - bass (1998)
- Jaroslav "Pišta" Sedláček - bass (2005–2024)
- Karel Řepecký - guitars (1998–2011)

== Discography ==
- Twilight of Legends (1998)
- Skarremar (2000)
- Great Moravian Elegies (2004)
- Faces of Chimera (2007)
- Time to Change (2010)
- Imperatus (2014)
- Opus Bohemica (2022)
