= Follow the Cipher =

Swedish heavy metal band

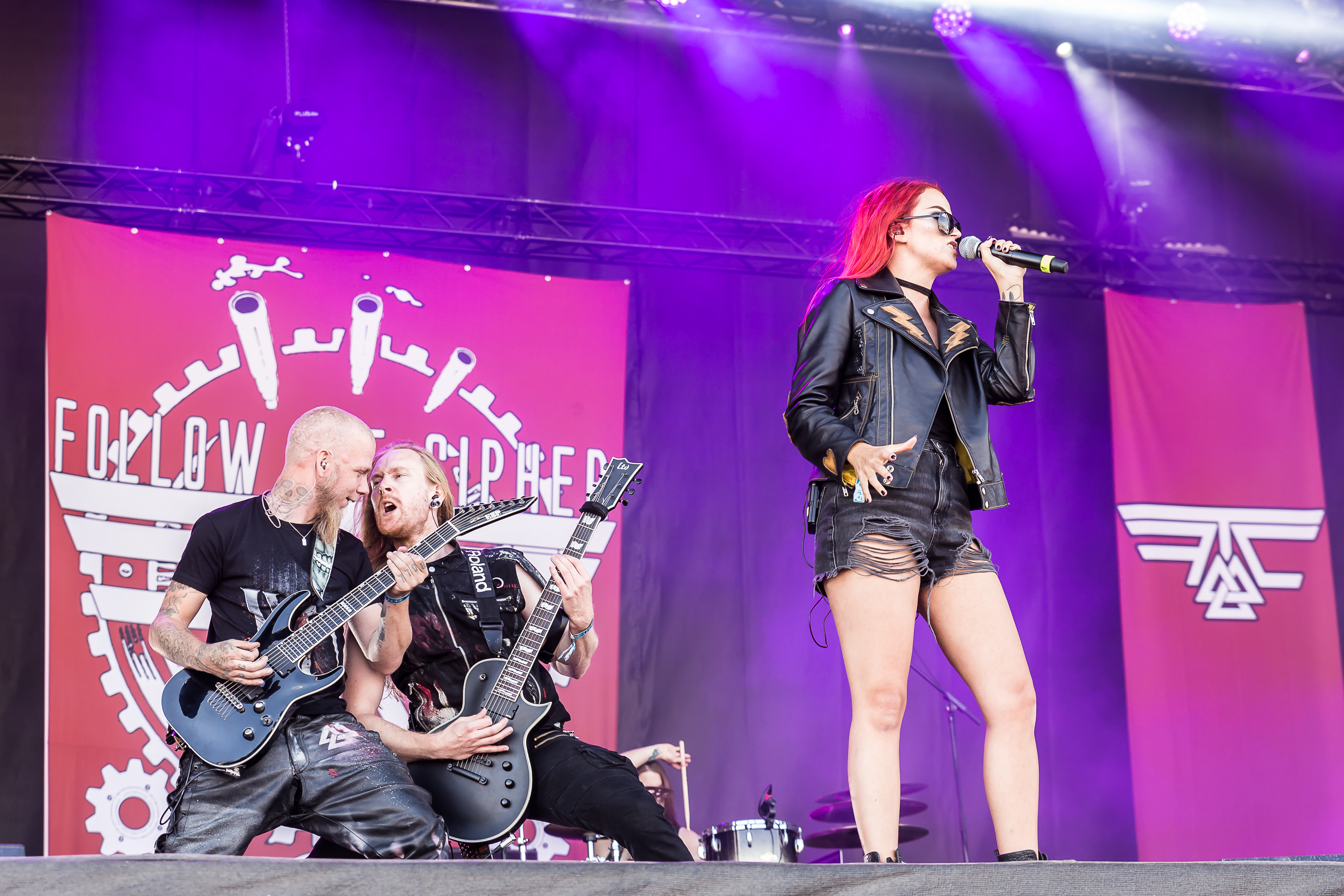
- Follow the Cipher at Rockharz Open Air 2019

Background information
- Origin: Falun, Sweden
- Genres: Power metal; symphonic metal
- Years active: 2014–present (on hold since 2021)
- Labels: Nuclear Blast
- Members: Ken Kängström; Viktor Carlsson; Daniel Sjögren
- Past members: Björn Lundqvist; Joakim Johansson; Viktor Gustavsson; Jonas Asplind; Karl Löfgren; Linda Toni Grahn

Follow the Cipher is a Swedish symphonic power metal band from Falun, formed in 2014 by guitarist and songwriter Ken Kängström, a longtime Sabaton contributor. An early line-up featured bassist Jonas Asplind, drummer Karl Löfgren and guitarist/backing vocalist Viktor Carlsson. The band released their self‑titled debut album on Nuclear Blast Records on 11 May 2018. They subsequently issued the single "The Pioneer" with a lyric video in June 2019, and in October 2021 the band announced the departure of vocalist Linda Toni Grahn while releasing "Rewind the Stars" as her farewell track. The band is currently on hold with no replacements for the departed members.

== Band members ==
Follow the Cipher live at Rockharz Open Air 2019

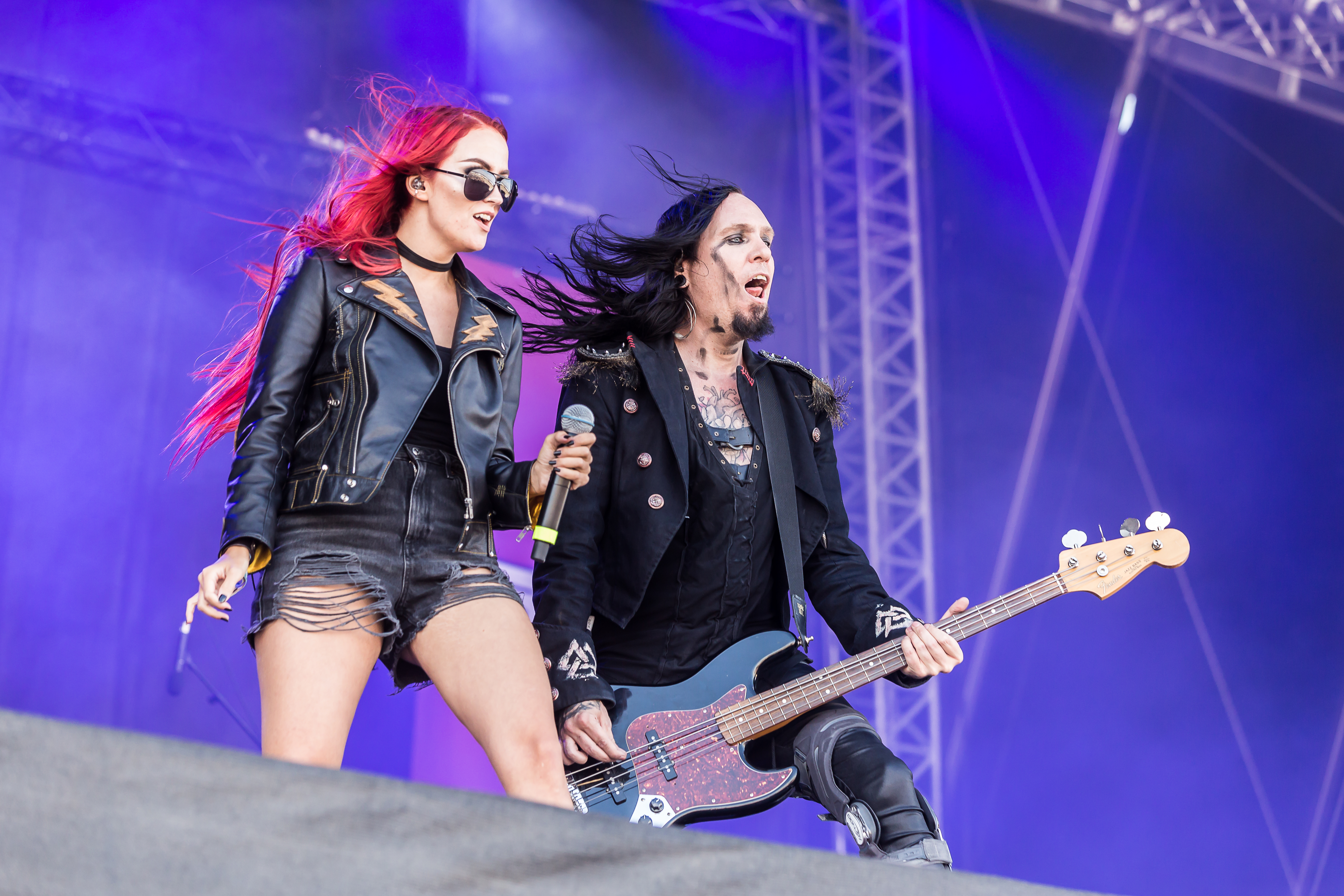
Singer Linda Toni Grahn and Bassist Jonas Asplind

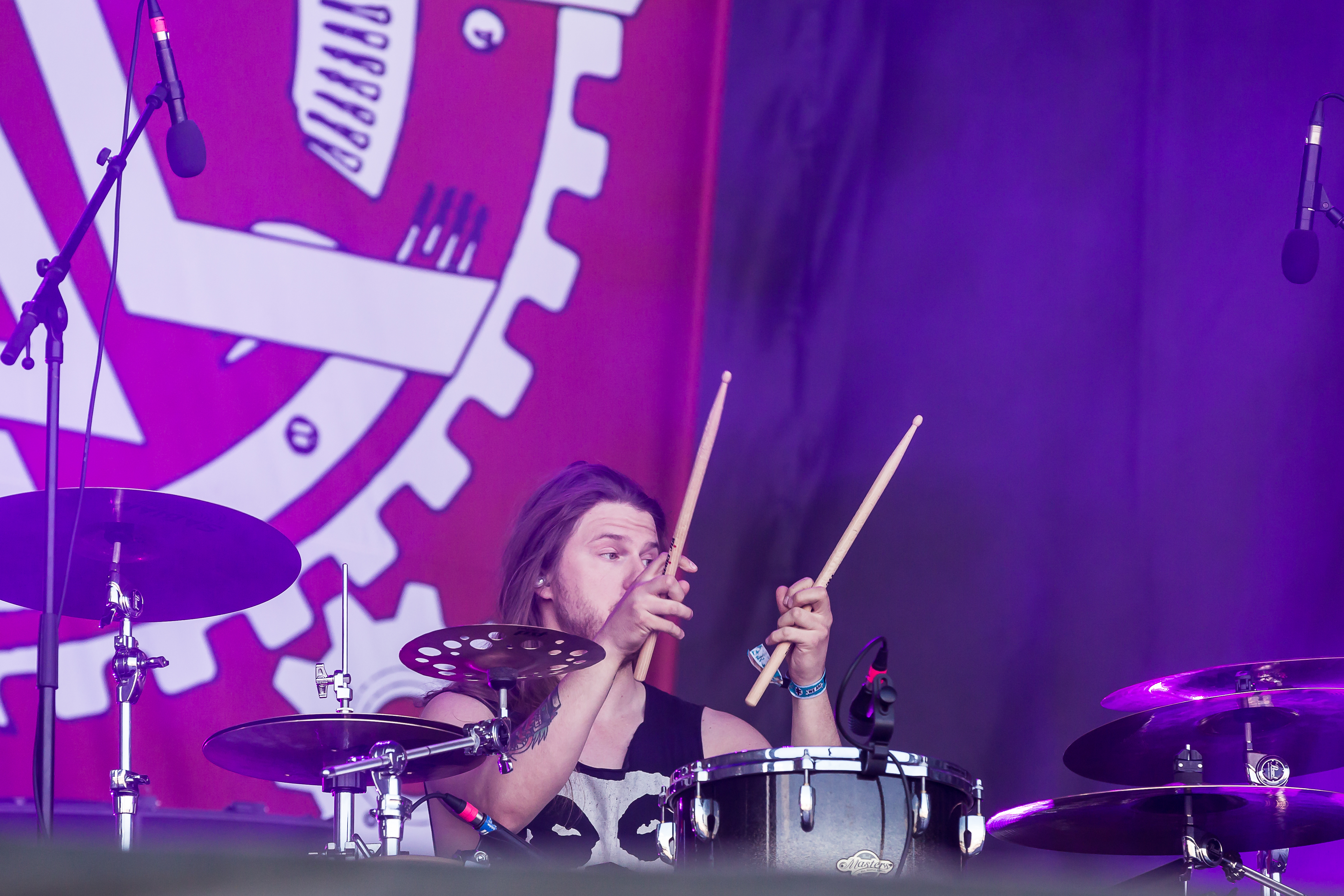
Drummer Karl Löfgren

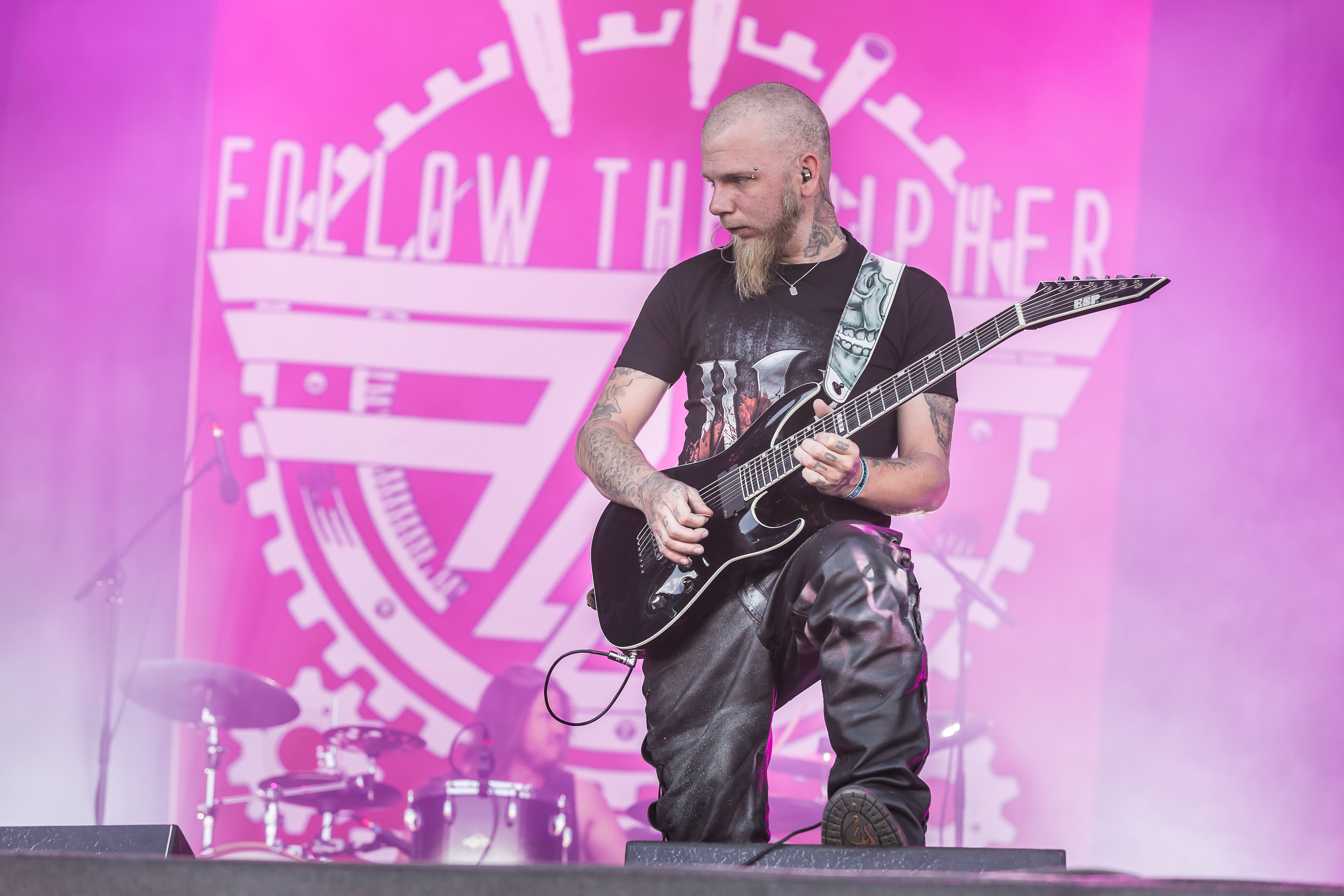
Guitarist Ken Kängström

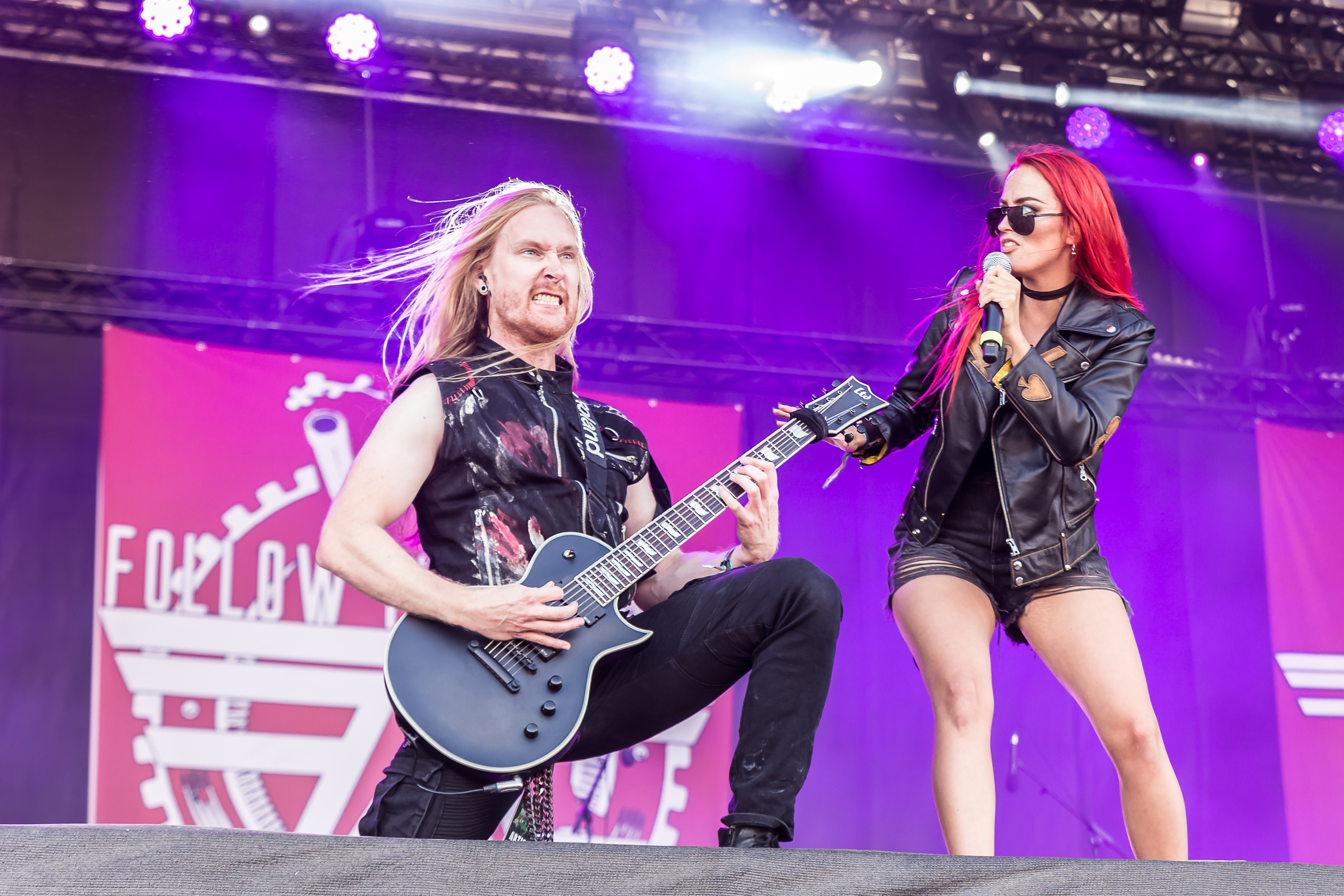
Guitarist Viktor Carlsson (and Singer Linda Toni Grahn)

=== Current ===
- Ken Kängström – lead guitar (2014–present)
- Viktor Carlsson – rhythm guitar, backing vocals (2014–present)
- Daniel Sjögren – drums (2014, 2019–present)

=== Former ===
- Viktor Gustavsson – lead vocals (2014)
- Joakim Johansson – rhythm guitar (2014)
- Björn Lundqvist – bass (2014)
- Karl Löfgren – drums (2014–2019)
- Jonas Asplind – bass, backing vocals (2014–2020)
- Linda Toni Grahn – lead vocals (2014–2021)

== Discography ==
Studio albums

- Follow the Cipher (2018)

Singles

- "The Pioneer" (2019)
- "Rewind the Stars" (2021)
