= Lick It Up – A Millennium Tribute to Kiss =

2008 compilation album

Compilation album
- Released: April 1, 2008
- Genre: Hard rock
- Length: 68:06
- Label: Versailles
- Producer: Jake Brown

Lick It Up – A Millennium Tribute to Kiss is a tribute album to American hard rock band Kiss. The album features various artists covering Kiss songs. Artists include Joe Lynn Turner (Rainbow), Keri Kelli (Alice Cooper/Ratt), Ryan Roxie (Slash's Snakepit), Andrew Santagata, Signal 99, Strike Force and Alligator Jackson amongst others. This compilation was released by Versailles Records in April 2008.

The release also includes a 2 CD Bonus Sampler entitled ‘Strip Club Rock Vol. 1/2’, which features a variety of unsigned millennium rock bands.

== Track listing ==
CD 1: Lick It Up – A Millennium Tribute to Kiss

- "Lick It Up " (4:04) performed by Ron Keel, Richard Kendrick
- "Detroit Rock City " (3:49) performed by Slashtones feat. Joe Lynn Turner
- "Forever " (3:50) performed by Richard Kendrick
- "I Love It Loud " (4:34) performed by Richard Kendrick, AJ Caruso, Fran Gilbert, Gerald Kloos, Chris Heaven
- "Beth " (3:05) performed by Rose Reiter
- "Shout It Out Loud " (2:47) performed by Kerri Kelli
- "Heaven's on Fire " (3:14) performed by Chris Catena, Teenage Rampage
- "The Oath" (4:57) performed by Mind's Eye
- "Shock Me " (4:27) performed by Kiss Alive! (Dan Gamma, Luke Luv, Pat Porpora, Thomas Pressano), Reckless Fortune
- "Tears Are Falling " (4:06) performed by Johnny Dee, Richard Kendrick
- "She" (4:43) performed by Snowblynd
- "I Stole Your Love" (3:07) performed by Jason McMaster, SSIK
- "Let's Put the X in Sex" (3:52) performed by Chuck Bonnett
- "Black Diamond " (4:38) performed by Ryan Roxie
- "New York Groove " (3:57) performed by Dead End Kidz
- "C'mon and Love Me " (2:56) performed by Andrew Santagata
- "Deuce " (2:52) Supermodel performed by Autopsy
- "Parasite" (3:08) performed by Katet

CD 2: Strip Rock Club - Volume 1

1. One Bad Son "Crooked Mic Stand"
2. Dour "Suck It Like A Porn Star"
3. Hyped Society "Inflicted System"
4. Meddling Kids "Goodbye"
5. Alligator Jackson "Liquid Courage"
6. Strike Force "Falling Down"
7. Ground Level "Hollow"
8. Clear "The Ghost"
9. Veritas "Black Skulls"
10. Deadly Sins "Between The Eyes"
11. Marko Pukkila / Vinny Appice / Rowan Robertson "And The Cradle Will Rock"
12. Viper "Dirty White Boy"
13. The Jack "This Is The Call"
14. S.E.X. Department "Revenge Of Vampires"
15. Elephant Hunter "Where Is The Fire?"
16. Unequaled Clarity "Punksure"
17. Beest Spawn "Time To Kill Again"
18. Disarray "Punishment For Being Born"
19. Gilby Clarke With American Dog "Wild Flower"
20. Trinity "Heartbreak Ridge"
21. Joetown "Feelin’ Rock N’ Roll"
22. Radio Vipers "Body Of Mars"
23. Phearus "A Typical Day"
24. Hellrazor "Guilty As Charged"
25. 6:AM "Premonition"

CD 3: Strip Club Rock - Volume 2

1. Cellbound "Nothing Is Die For"
2. Signal 99 "Armed And Dangerous"
3. Inflicted System "Waking Up"
4. Lovebones "B.O.N.E."
5. Jizzy Pearl With American Dog "Fire Woman"
6. 12 Yrs. Coming "Shut Up"
7. Freebleeder "5530"
8. Six Days To Nowhere "Feed"
9. Jimmy Crespo & Paul Shortino "Sweet Soul Sister"
10. Aedose "Mirrors"
11. Shattersphere "Unravel"
12. Mad Staring Eyes "Walking in the Streets"
13. Deadly Tide "Sexy Disco Sexy"
14. Santagata Band "The Switch"
15. Inflicted System "Hatred Thoughts"
16. Souls On Monday "Litterbox"
17. Skitzo "Curse Of The Phoenix"
18. Schmelvis Band "Jerusalem Hotel"
19. S.E.X. Department "Drive Me Insane"
20. Karen Single Band "The Wild Side"
21. Viper "Critical Overture"
