= Crucified Barbara =

Swedish hard rock/heavy metal band

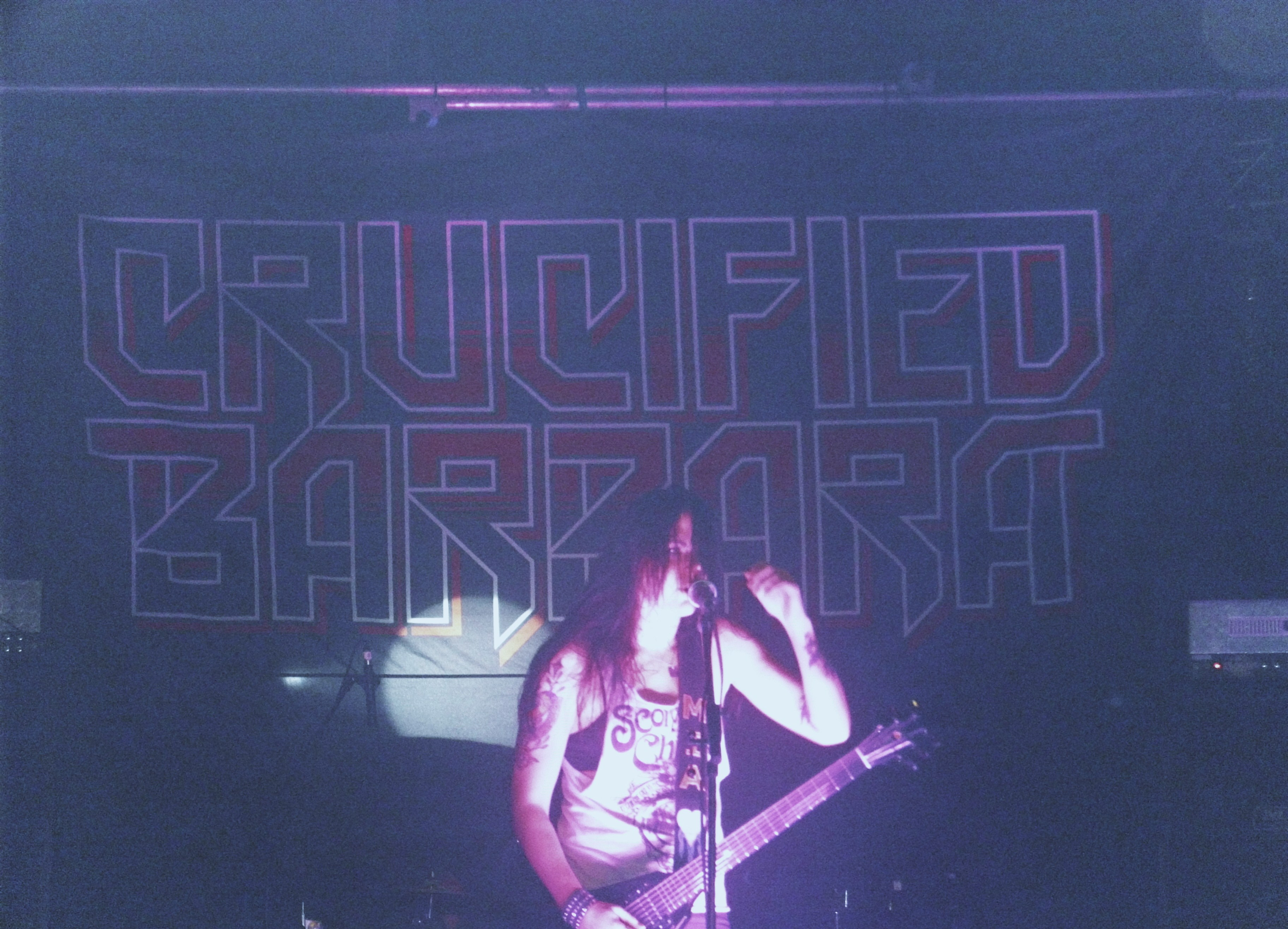

Background information
- Origin: Stockholm, Sweden
- Genres: Hard rock, heavy metal
- Years active: 1998–2016, 2024–present
- Members: Mia Coldheart; Klara Force; Ida Evileye; Nicki Wicked
- Past members: Joey Nine
- Website: crucifiedbarbara.com

Crucified Barbara are an all-female Swedish hard rock and heavy metal band, formed in Stockholm in 1998.

== Background ==
Crucified Barbara started out in 1998 as a punk rock band, but soon they changed their primary style to hard rock. They signed in 2003 with GMR Music Group of Stockholm. Recordings took place in Kristianopel, Sweden at Pama Studios/Blakk Records with producer-engineer Mankan Sedenberg during the spring of 2004. Their advance debut single from their first album In Distortion We Trust, was "Losing the Game". It was released on 8 December 2005 and went straight to No. 8 on the Swedish music charts. The video to accompany it was recorded and produced by M Industries. The album was released in Sweden on 19 January and is available outside Sweden in several countries including the UK, the US, France, Germany, and Benelux. In 2006, they contributed two songs, "Killed by Death" and "Please Don't Touch", to St. Valentines Day Massacre, a tribute album to Motörhead.

Crucified Barbara's second album, Til Death Do Us Party, was released in Scandinavia on 11 February 2009 and in the rest of Europe on 27 February. It was produced in part by Mats Levén (known for producing albums by Yngwie Malmsteen, Krux, and Therion, among other bands within that genre. Mats also sang vocals on the song "Jennyfer".

In November 2009, Crucified Barbara went out on a six weeks European tour to promote the new album Til Death Do Us Party. They played in Germany, Belgium, the Netherlands, France, Spain, Italy, Switzerland, Czech Republic and Sweden. A documentary film was made about the tour by film-maker Mats Lundberg from Doom Films. The documentary was released in 2010.

The Band competed in Melodifestivalen 2010 with the song "Heaven or Hell", They made it to the Second Chance from their semifinal in Gothenburg but lost out to Pernilla Wahlgren in the deciding round after beating out Pauline Kamusewu in the first round.

The band announced their split in June 2016.

A few days later, Karlsson announced her solo project under her real name.

In April 2017, Fors, Stenbacka and Lindström announced their new band, The Heard, on Facebook.

In October 2024, they announced their reunion. Their first show will be at Sweden Rock 2025.

== Lineup ==
Current Members
- Mia "Coldheart" Karlsson – lead guitar (1998–2016, 2024–present), lead vocals (2003–2016, 2024–present)
- Klara "Force" Rönnqvist Fors – rhythm guitar, backing vocals (1998–2016, 2024–present)
- Ida "Evileye" Stenbacka – bass, backing vocals (1998–2016, 2024–present)
- Jannicke "Nicki Wicked" Lindström – drums, backing vocals (1998–2016, 2024–present)

Former Members

- Joey Nine – lead vocals (1998-2003)

== Discography ==
=== Album ===
Title	Album details	Peak chart positions	
Title	Album details	SWE	JPN
In Distortion We Trust	Released: May 30, 2005; Label: GMR Music Group; Formats: CD, digital download	47	—
'Til Death Do Us Party	Released: February 27, 2009; Label: GMR Music Group; Formats: CD, digital download	53	274
The Midnight Chase	Released: May 28, 2012; Label: Verycords; Formats: CD, digital download	51	—
In The Red	Released: September 10, 2014; Label: Despotz Records; Formats: CD, digital download	—	—
"—" denotes a recording that did not chart or was not released in that territory.

=== Singles ===
Title	Year	Peak chart positions	Album
Title	Year	SWE	Album
Losing the Game	2005	8	In Distortion We Trust
Rock'n'Roll Bachelor	2005	—	In Distortion We Trust
Play Me Hard	2006	—	In Distortion We Trust
Sex Action	2008	—	Til Death Do Us Party
Jennyfer	2009	—	Til Death Do Us Party
Fire	2009	—	non-album single
Heaven or Hell	2010	31	non-album single
Into the Fire	2012	—	The Midnight Chase
To Kill a Man	2014	—	In the Red
Electric Sky	2014	—	In the Red
"—" denotes a recording that did not chart or was not released in that territory.

== Tours ==
In November 2006, they supported Motörhead along with Clutch. They played at the heavy metal festival Sweden Rock in June, 2006 and again in 2009, with bands such as Heaven & Hell, In Flames and Dream Theater. In 2010 they played at Wacken Open Air. In 2013 they played at Graspop Metal Meeting and Metalfest in Czech Republic.

In 2015, Crucified Barbara joined Girlschool on the North America 'Guilty As Sin' tour.
