= Avatarium =

Swedish doom metal band

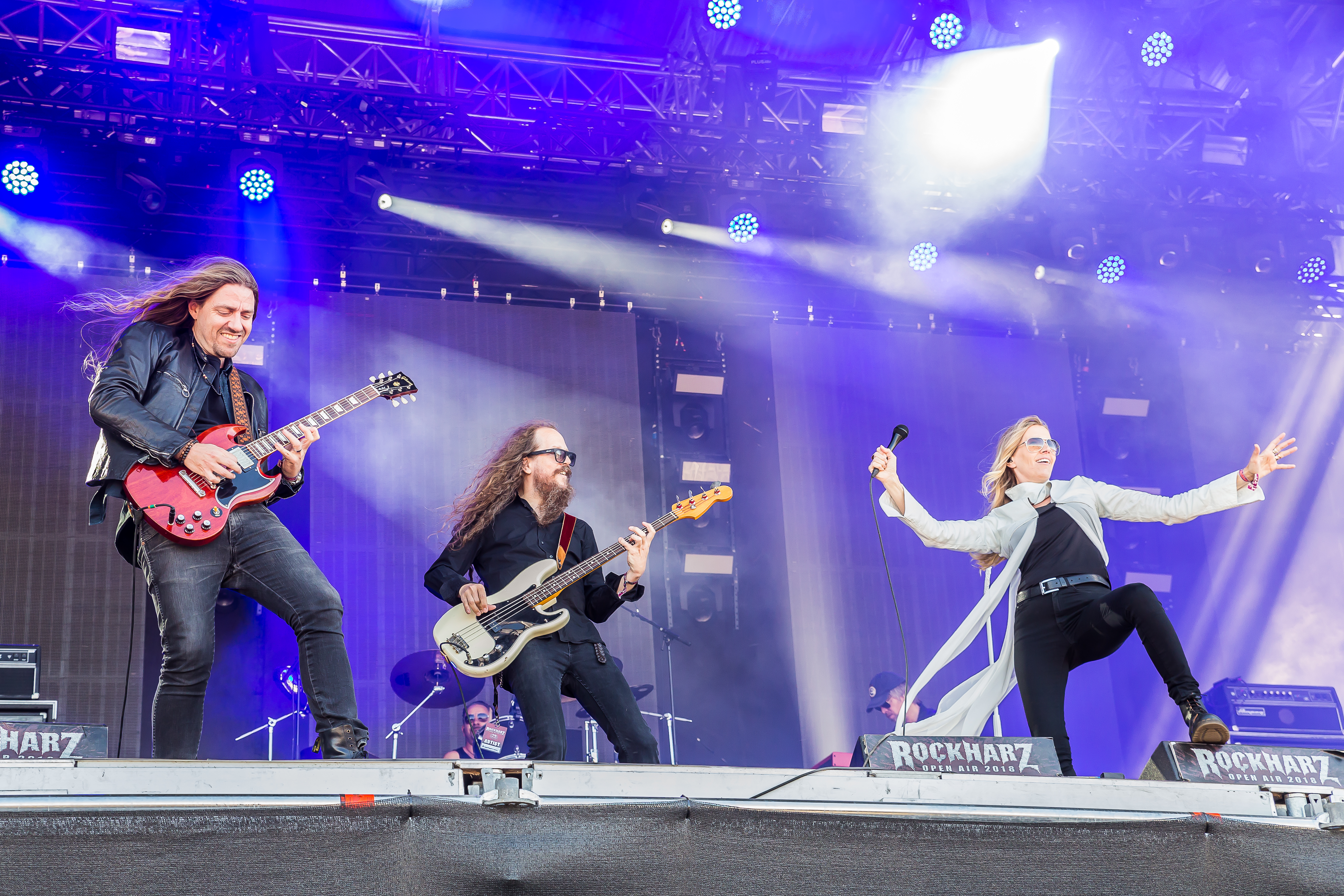
- Avatarium at Rockharz Open Air 2018

Background information
- Origin: Stockholm, Sweden
- Genres: Doom metal; progressive rock; occult rock
- Years active: 2013–present
- Labels: Nuclear Blast; AFM
- Members: Jennie-Ann Smith; Marcus Jidell; Lars Sköld; Mats Rydström; Rickard Nilsson
- Past members: Leif Edling; Carl Westholm
- Website: avatarium.se

Avatarium is a Swedish doom metal band from Stockholm, founded by Candlemass member Leif Edling in 2013.

== Biography ==
In the winter of 2012, Candlemass founder and bassist Leif Edling started to work on a new project and wrote a few demos. Looking for musical partners, he first reached out to his friend, Opeth frontman Mikael Åkerfeldt, but due to a lack of time, he declined. Therefore, Stockholm-based guitarist Marcus Jidell (Soen, ex-Evergrey, ex-Royal Hunt) offered to help. Soon, Tiamat drummer Lars Sköld and keyboardist Carl Westholm joined the new band and the line-up was completed by Jidell's wife Jennie-Ann Smith, whose deep and bluesy voice added a new touch to Edling's typical heavy doom riffs.

By September 2013, they released their first EP Moonhorse and in November, their critically acclaimed eponymous full-length debut followed through Nuclear Blast.

The band's first live show outside of Sweden took place at the Dutch Roadburn Festival in April 2014, and in the fall of the same year, the Swedes released the EP All I Want.

After a European tour and several festival appearances, the band entered the studio once more to record their second album. The Girl with the Raven Mask was released worldwide in October 2015 and was voted Album of the Month in several leading European magazines, such as Rock Hard and Metal Hammer. It was nominated for the independent music prize Manifest in Sweden, and in September 2016, Avatarium received the "Up and Coming" award from Germany's Metal Hammer.

For health issues, Leif Edling quit playing live shows with the band on their headline tour through Europe, and Anders Iwers joined the band as a live member. Although Edling stepped out of the spotlight, he is still active as songwriter for the band.

At the end of 2016, Avatarium entered the studio again to record their third album, Hurricanes and Halos, together with their new bassist Mats Rydström and organist Rickard Nilsson. This time, singer Jennie-Ann Smith and guitarist Marcus Jidell also contributed to the songwriting. The full-length album was released on 26 May 2017 through Nuclear Blast. Their next album, The Fire I Long For, was released on 22 November 2019.

As of April 2022, Avatarium is signed to AFM Records and their fifth album, Death Where Is Your Sting, was released in October 2022.

== Discography ==
- Avatarium (2013)
- The Girl with the Raven Mask (2015)
- Hurricanes and Halos (2017)
- The Fire I Long For (2019)
- Death, Where Is Your Sting (2022)
- Between You, God, the Devil and the Dead (2025)

== Gallery ==
Avatarium at Rockharz Open Air 2018

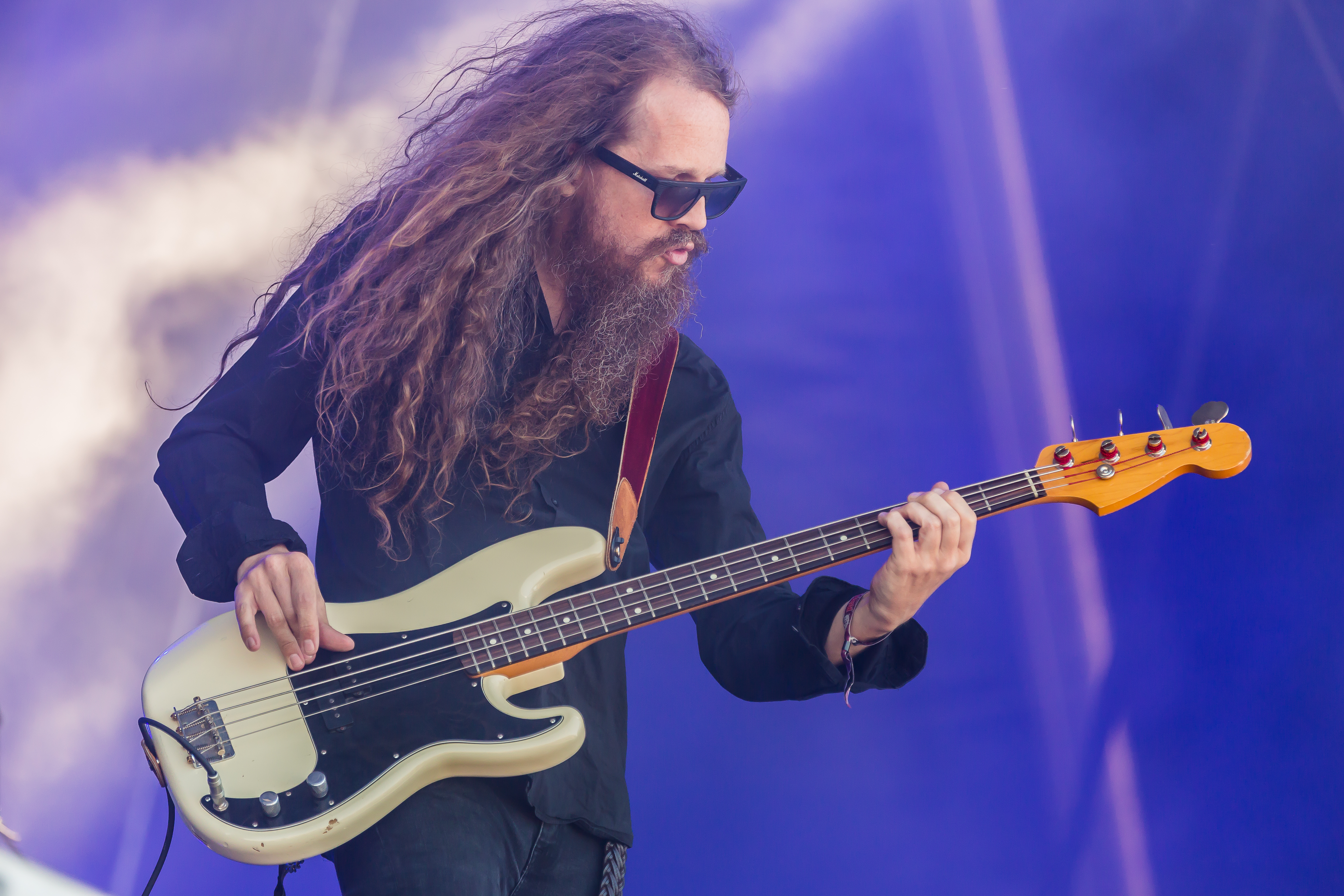
Bassist Mats Rydström

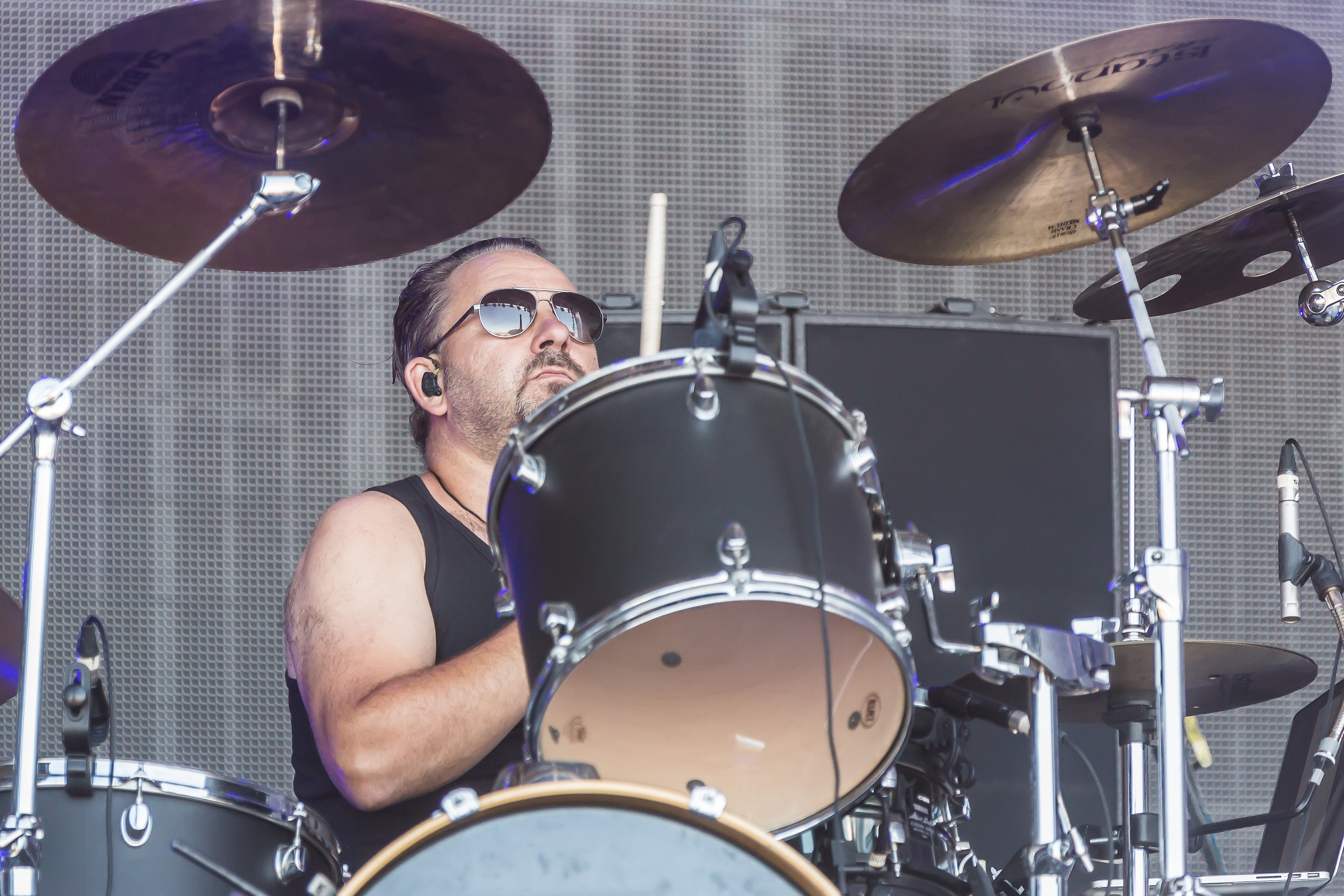
Drummer Lars Sköld

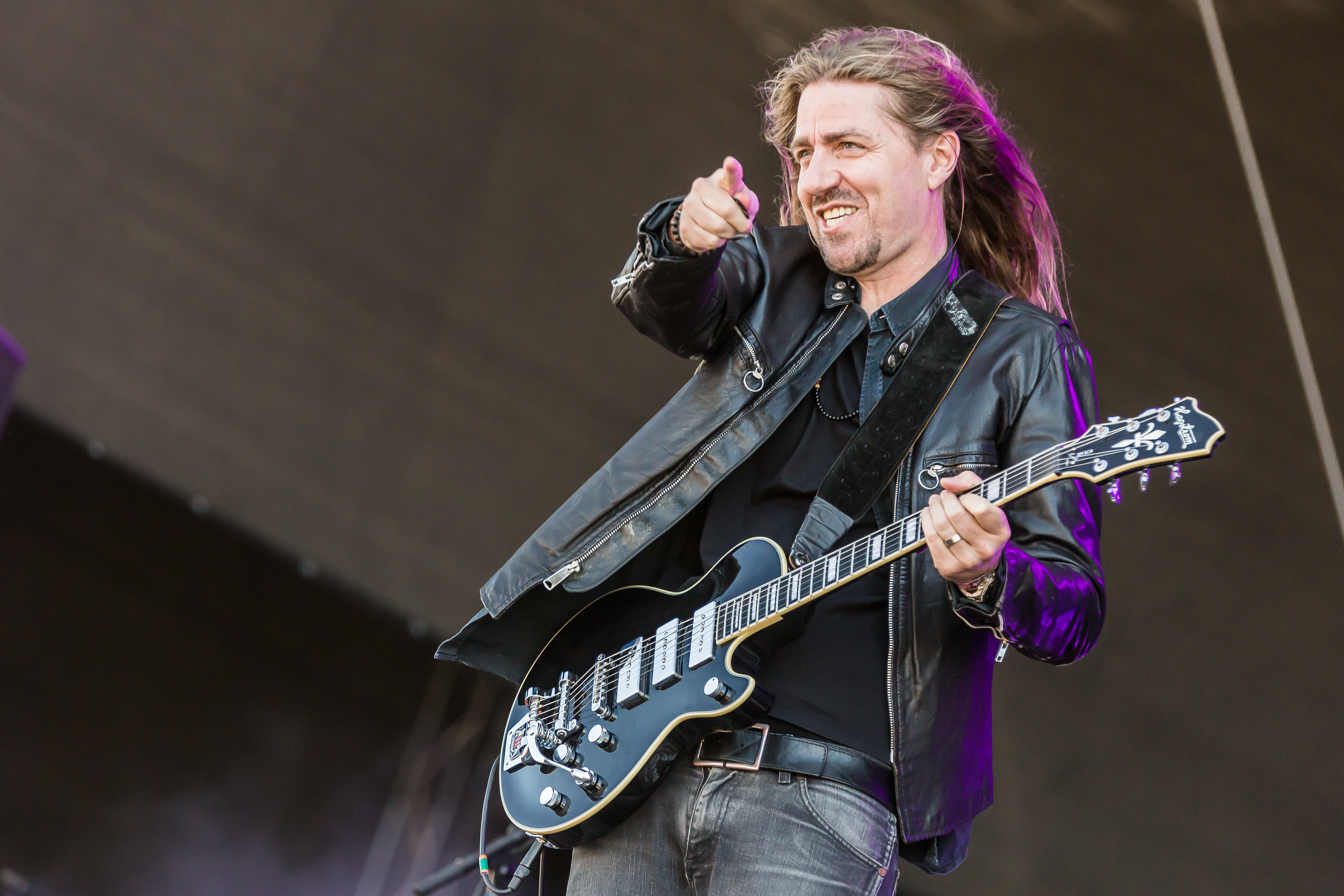
Guitarist Marcus Jidell

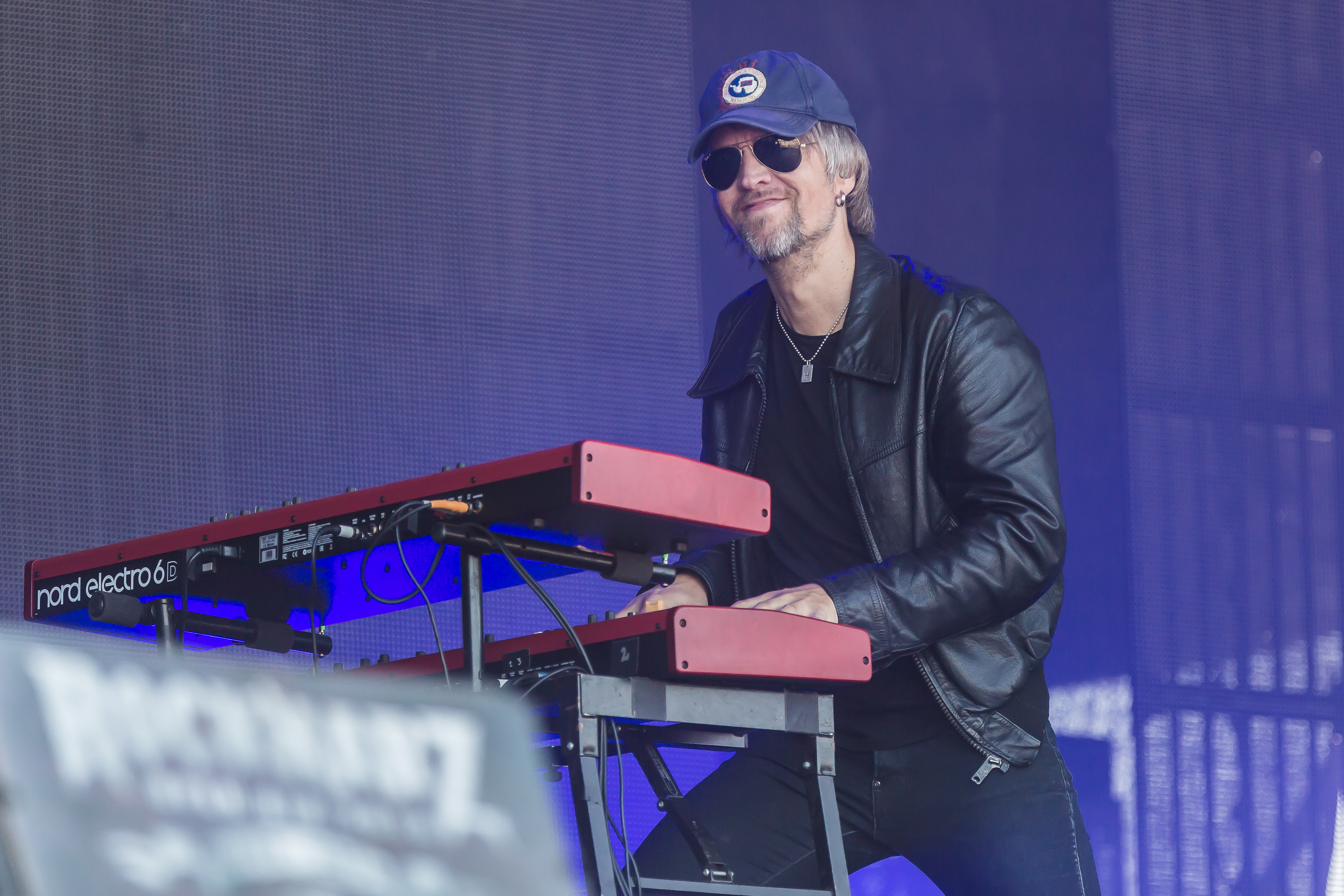
Keyboardist Rickard Nilsson

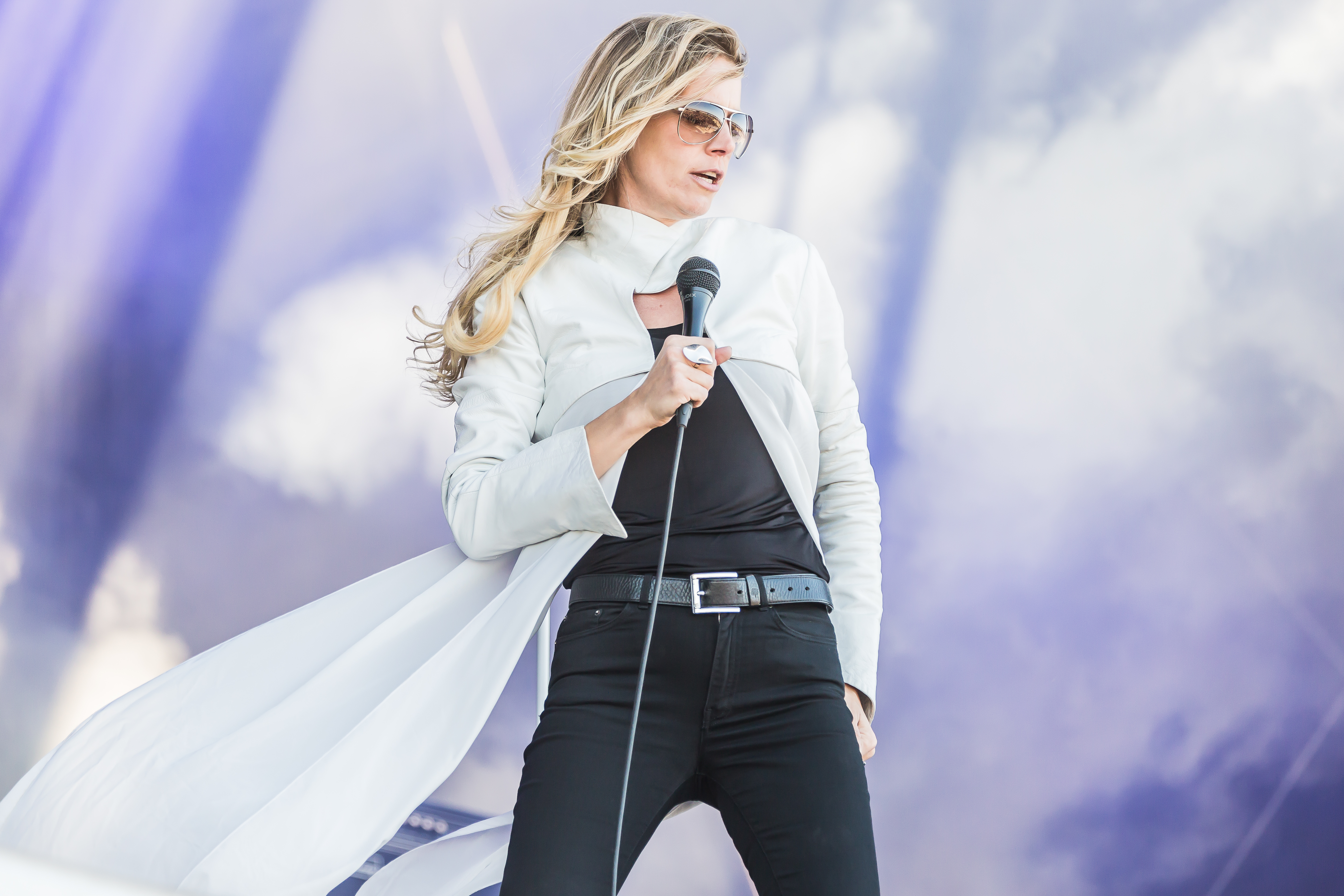
Singer Jennie-Ann Smith
