= Die Happy (German band) =

German rock band

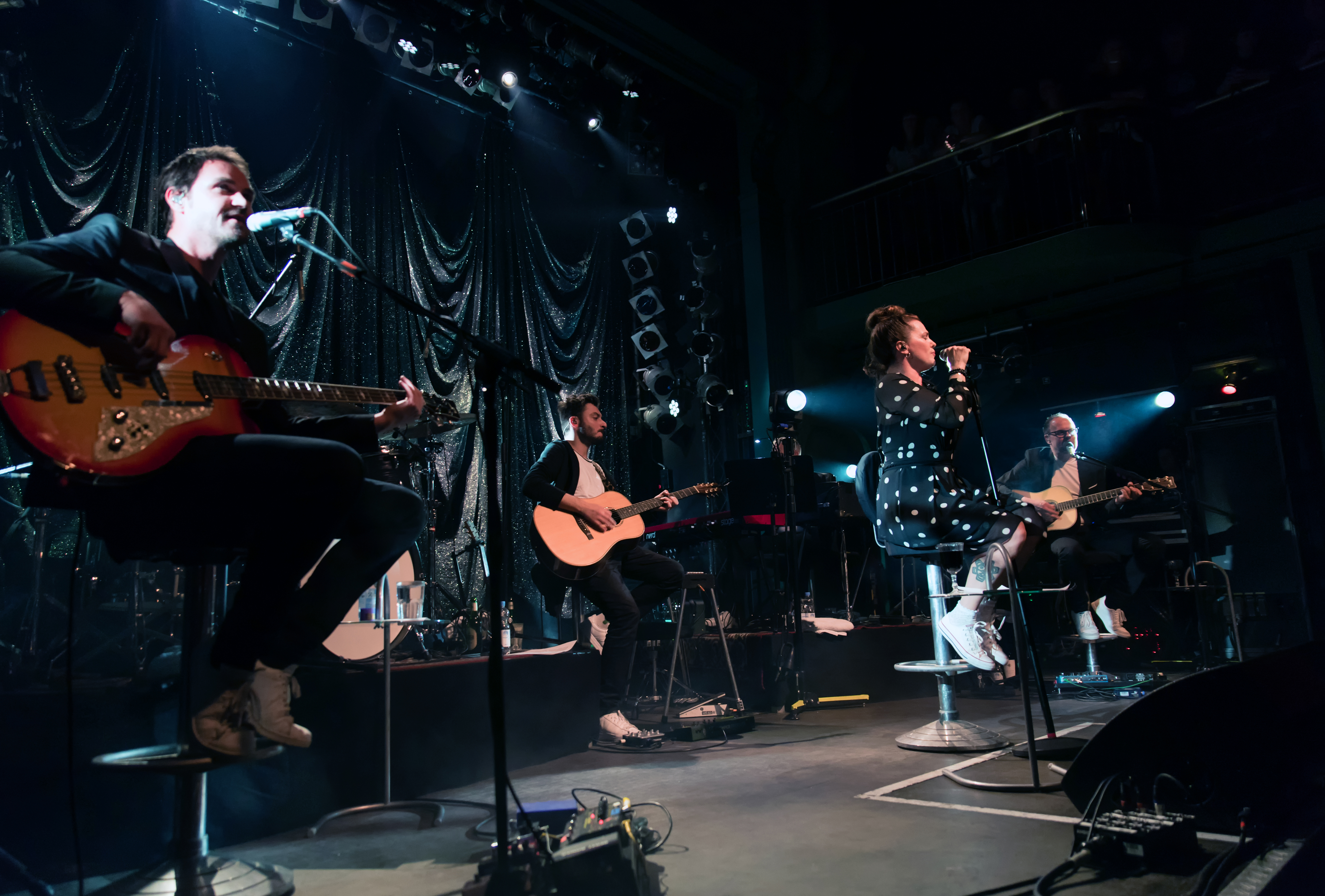
- The band performing in 2018

Background information
- Origin: Ulm, Germany
- Genres: Alternative rock; alternative metal
- Years active: 1993–present
- Labels: Gun Records/Sony BMG
- Members: Marta Jandová; Thorsten Mewes; Ralph Rieker; Jürgen Stiehle
- Past members: Frede Ferber; Holger Fiesel; Marcus Heinzmann; Julian Rosenthal
- Website: diehappy.de

Die Happy is a German alternative rock band from Ulm. The group was founded in 1993 by Czech singer Marta Jandová and Thorsten Mewes. Even though the band is based in Germany, their songs are written and performed almost exclusively in English.

== Band members ==
- Marta Jandová (vocals)
- Thorsten Mewes (guitar)
- Ralph Rieker (bass)
- Jürgen Stiehle (drums)

== Discography ==
=== Albums ===
| Year | Album | Chart positions | | | |
| Year | Album | GER | AUT | SWI | CZ |
|---|---|---|---|---|---|
| 1994 | Better Than Nothing: Released: Label: Format: | — | — | — | — |
| 1996 | Dirty Flowers: Released: Label: Format: | — | — | — | — |
| 1997 | Promotion: Released: Label: Format: | — | — | — | — |
| 2001 | Supersonic Speed: Released: 3 February 2001; Label: Ariola; Format: CD, CS | 43 | — | — | — |
| 2002 | Beautiful Morning: Released: 1 April 2002; Label: BMG; Format: CD | 15 | 51 | — | — |
| 2003 | The Weight of the Circumstances: Released: 8 August 2003; Label: Firestarter; Format: CD, LP | 6 | 16 | 53 | — |
| 2005 | Bitter to Better: Released: Label: GUN; Format: CD, LP | 9 | 40 | 51 | — |
| 2005 | Four and More (Unplugged): Released: 11 November 2005; Label: GUN; Format: CD | — | — | — | — |
| 2006 | No Nuts No Glory: Released: 20 October 2006; Label: BMG; Format: | 28 | — | 88 | — |
| 2008 | VI: Released: 22 April 2008; Label: GUN; Format: | 13 | 74 | — | — |
| 2009 | Most Wanted (Best Of): Released: 21 July 2009; Label: Columbia; Format: | 51 | — | — | 35 |
| 2010 | Red Box: Released: 28 September 2010; Label: F.A.M.E.; Format: CD | 30 | — | — | — |
| 2014 | Ever Love: Released: 28 February 2014; Label: F.A.M.E.; Format: CD | 35 | — | — | — |
| 2020 | Guess What: Released: 10 April 2020; Label: Bullet Records; Format: CD, DD | 39 | — | — | — |
"—" denotes releases that did not chart

=== Singles ===
| Year | Title | Chart positions | Album |
| Year | Title | GER | Album |
|---|---|---|---|
| 2000 | "Supersonic SpeedJam" | — | Supersonic Speed |
| 2001 | "One Million Times" | — | Supersonic Speed |
| 2001 | "Like a Flower" | — | Supersonic Speed |
| 2002 | "Not That Kind of Girl" | 99 | Beautiful Morning |
| 2002 | "Goodbye" | 63 | Beautiful Morning |
| 2002 | "Cry for More" | — | Beautiful Morning |
| 2003 | "Everyday's a Weekend" | 96 | Weight of the Circumstances |
| 2003 | "Big Boy" | 63 | Weight of the Circumstances |
| 2004 | "Slow Day" | — | Weight of the Circumstances |
| 2005 | "I Am" | 75 | Bitter to Better |
| 2005 | "Big Big Trouble" | 41 | Bitter to Better |
| 2005 | "Blood Cell Traffic" | — | Bitter to Better |
| 2006 | "The Ordinary Song" | — | No Nuts No Glory |
| 2006 | "Wanna Be Your Girl" | 80 | No Nuts No Glory |
| 2008 | "Still Love You" | — | VI |
| 2008 | "Peaches" | — | VI |
| 2010 | "Dance for You Tonight" | — | Red Box |
| 2011 | "Anytime" | — | Red Box |
| 2014 | "I Could Die Happy" | — | Ever Love |
| 2019 | "Love Suicide" | — | Guess What |
| 2020 | "Guess What" | — | Guess What |
| 2020 | "Here I Am" | — | Guess What |
"—" denotes releases that did not chart

DVDs

- The Weight of the Circumstances (2003)
- 10 – Live and Alive (2004)
