= Shakra =

Swiss hard rock band

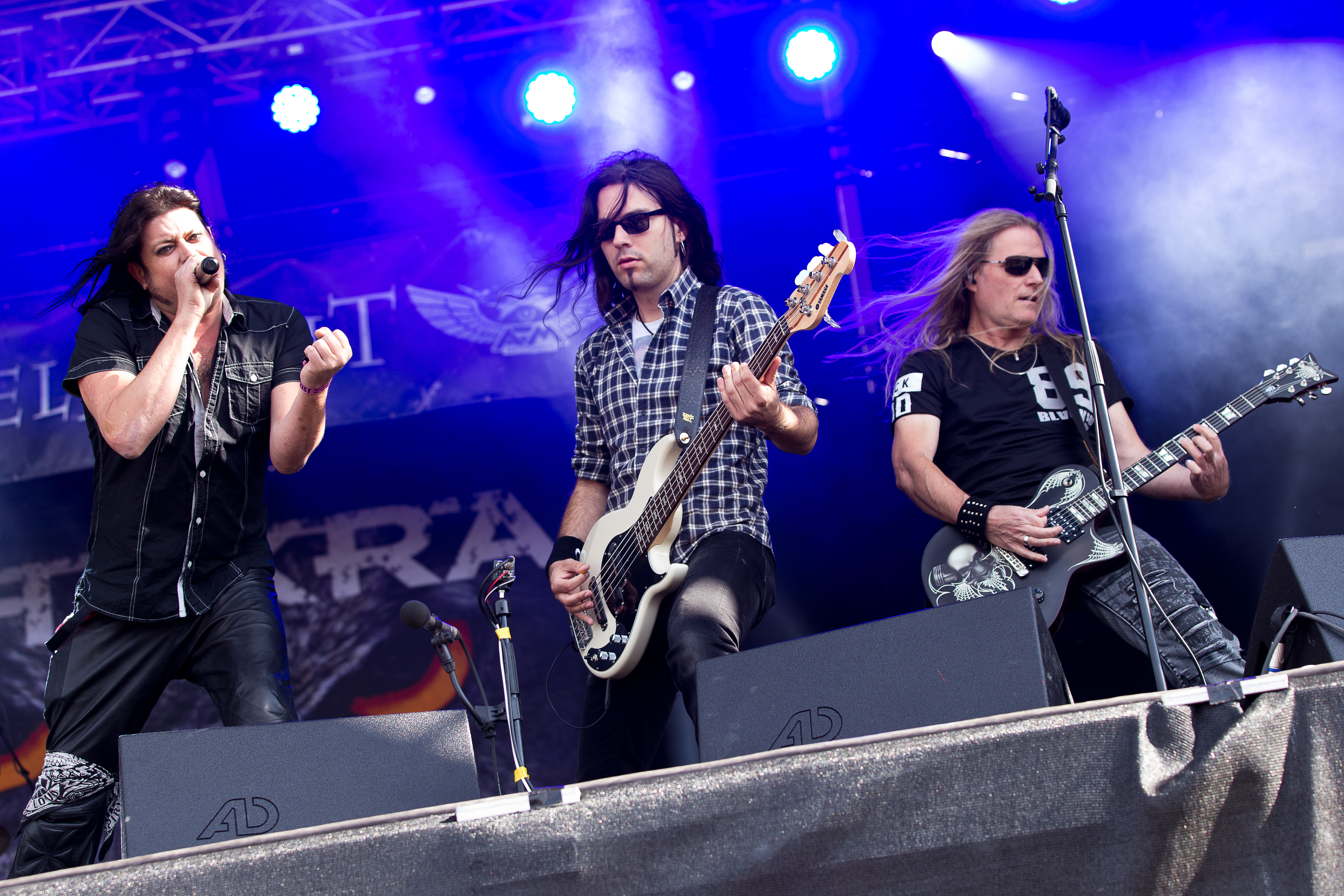
- Shakra at the Rockharz festival 2016 in Germany

Background information
- Origin: Bern, Switzerland
- Genres: Hard rock, heavy metal
- Years active: 1995–present
- Label: AFM
- Members: Mark Fox; Thom Blunier; Thomas Muster; Dominik Pfister; Roger Tanner
- Past members: Pete Wiedmer; Oliver Linder; John Prakesh
- Website: http://www.shakra.ch

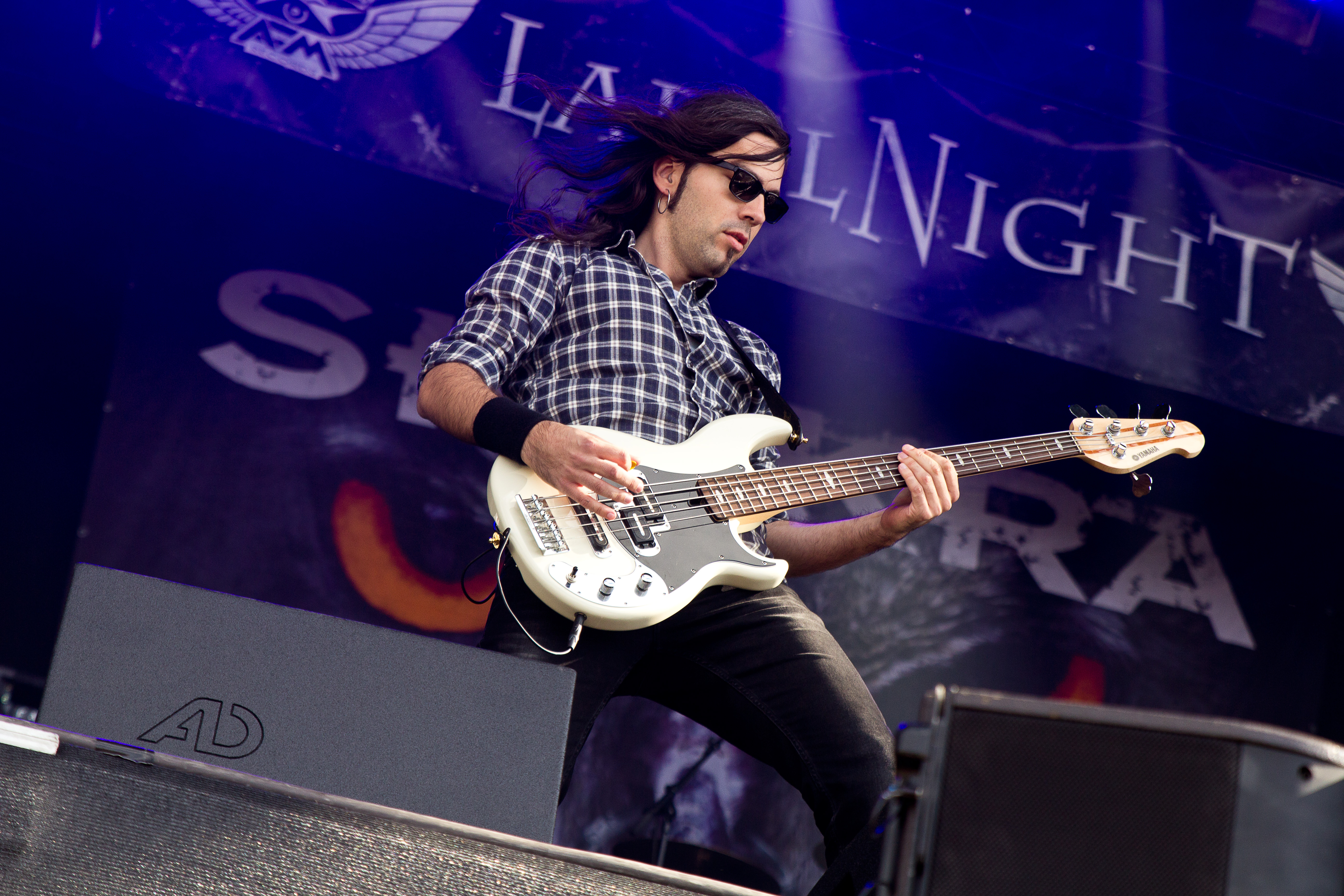
Bassist Dominik Pfister at the Rockharz 2016

Shakra is a Swiss hard rock band founded in the 1990s.

== History ==
With their first releases Shakra (1997), and Moving Force (1999), and by touring with Great White and Uriah Heep, the early career of this Swiss band was a steep learning curve with dramatic success but the real breakthrough came with their third record Power Ride (2001) when singer Pete Wiedmer was forced to leave the band because of ill health, replaced by Mark Fox. Fox immediately put his stamp on the following album Rising (2003), which saw Shakra hit the German and Swiss album charts. The band played several concerts and festivals, one of which was the prestigious "Bang Your Head" event. The controversial video clip for the song "Chains of Temptation" showed singer Fox giving himself a heroin injection.

After supporting Iron Maiden at the Swiss "Spirit of Rock" festival, Shakra went on a 12-country tour with HammerFall and Stratovarius. The band played a significant show in Zurich with Guns N' Roses in 2006.

Shortly after the Everest album was released, Mark Fox left the band and was replaced by John Prakesh on vocals.

The band released "Back On Track" in February 2011 and "Powerplay" in January 2013.

On April 23, 2014, John Prakesh announced he was leaving Shakra.

In October 2015, Mark Fox joined Shakra again, after which the single "Hello" was released.

== Discography ==
=== Studio albums ===
- Shakra (1998)
- Moving Force (1999)
- Power Ride (2001)
- Rising (2003)
- Fall (2005)
- Infected (2007)
- Everest (2009)
- Back on Track (2011)
- Powerplay (2013)
- High Noon (2016)
- Snakes & Ladders (2017)
- Mad World (2020)
- Invincible (2023)
- Just Live Loud! (2026)

=== Live albums ===
- The Live Side (2000)
- My Life My World (2004)

=== Compilation albums ===
- Life Tales – The Ballads (2017)
