= All Shall Burn =

EP by Eleine
- Released: 22 November 2019
- Genre: Symphonic metal
- Length: 23:14
- Label: Black Lodge
- Producers: Rikard Ekberg, Madeleine "Eleine" Liljestam

Eleine chronology
Until the End (2018)	All Shall Burn (2019)	Dancing in Hell (2020)

All Shall Burn is an EP by Swedish symphonic metal band Eleine. It was released on 22 November 2019, through Black Lodge Records. It consists of two new tracks, two symphonic versions, and a cover of the Rammstein single "Mein Herz brennt". All Shall Burn reached number 13 on the Swedish music charts. They toured with Myrath in February and March 2020 in support of the album until the COVID-19 pandemic caused the cancellation of the final two weeks of the tour.

== Track listing ==
All tracks are written by Eleine.

No.	Title	Length
1.	"Enemies"	5:24
2.	"All Shall Burn"	4:16
3.	"Mein Herz brennt (Rammstein cover)"	4:22
4.	"Hell Moon (We Shall Never Die) (Symphonic Version)"	4:32
5.	"All Shall Burn (Symphonic Version)"	4:26
Total length:		23:19

== Personnel ==
- Madeleine "Eleine" Liljestam – lead vocals
- Rikard Ekberg – guitars, growled vocals
- Ludwig Dante – guitars
- Anton Helgesson – bass
- Jesper Sunnhagen – drums, percussion

Production

- Produced by Rikard Ekberg and Madeleine "Eleine" Liljestam
- Recorded, mixed, and mastered by Thomas "Plec" Johansson at The Panic Room, Skövde, Sweden

== Charts ==
Chart (2019)	Peak position
Swedish Albums (Sverigetopplistan)	13
