= To the Stars =

To the Stars may refer to:

- To the Stars (album), a 2004 album by Chick Corea Elektric Band inspired by Hubbard's novel
- To the Stars (novel), a science fiction novel by L. Ron Hubbard
- "To the Stars" (song), a 2011 song by Modestep
- To the Stars, a song by Twilight Force
- To the Stars... Demos, Odds and Ends, a 2015 American rock album by Tom DeLonge
- To the Stars (trilogy), series of science fiction novels by Harry Harrison: Homeworld, Wheelworld, and Starworld
- To the Stars: The Autobiography of George Takei, autobiography by actor George Takei
- To The Stars (company), an entertainment, science and aerospace company founded by Tom DeLonge
- To the Stars (film), a 2019 American drama film
- To the Stars: Costa Rica in NASA, a 2018 book by Bruce James Callow and Ana Luisa Monge Naranjo
