= Tales of Ancient Prophecies =

2014 album by Twilight Force

Studio album by Twilight Force
- Released: 4 June 2014 (Scandinavia); 6 June 2014 (Worldwide); 17 September 2014 (Japan)
- Recorded: 2011–2014
- Studio: dB-Studios; Ridge Street Studios; The Twilight Forge
- Genre: Symphonic power metal
- Length: 36:00
- Label: Black Lodge Records; Spiritual Beast (Japan)
- Producer: Daniele (Note: Blackwald); Felipe (Note: Lynd)

Twilight Force chronology
Tales of Ancient Prophecies (2014)	Heroes of Mighty Magic (2016)

Singles from Tales of Ancient Prophecies
- 1. "The Power of the Ancient Force" Released: April 15, 2014; 2. "Gates of Glory" Released: April 24, 2015

Tales of Ancient Prophecies is the debut studio album by Swedish symphonic power metal band Twilight Force, released on 4 June 2014 in Scandinavia and 6 June to worldwide audiences. It is the band's only album on Black Lodge Records; for their next studio album, Heroes of Mighty Magic, the band signed to Nuclear Blast Records. To support the album, the band embarked on a month-long European tour alongside Gloryhammer known as The Unicorn Invasion of Europe 2014. Although the album failed to chart internationally, it was a minor commercial success in the band's home country of Sweden, peaking at number 29 for 2 weeks.

== Track listing ==
All tracks are written by Daniele and Felipe

No.	Title	Length
1.	"Enchanted Dragon of Wisdom"	4:43
2.	"The Power of the Ancient Force"	5:03
3.	"Twilight Horizon"	4:59
4.	"The Summoning"	0:43
5.	"Whispering Winds"	0:51
6.	"Fall of the Eternal Winter"	4:54
7.	"Forest of Destiny"	4:06
8.	"In the Mighty Hall of the Fire King"	0:55
9.	"Made of Steel"	4:46
10.	"Sword of Magic Steel"	1:05
11.	"Gates of Glory"	3:55
Total length:		36:00

Japanese edition
No.	Title	Length
12.	"Eagle Fly Free" (Helloween cover)	5:26
Total length:		41:26

== Personnel ==
Twilight Force

- Daniele – keyboards, piano, violin, cembalo, narration, backing vocals
- Borne (Note: Born) – bass guitar
- Felipe – lead guitar, acoustic guitar, lute, backing vocals
- Christian Hedgren (Note: Chrileon) – lead vocals
- Roberto – drums, percussion

Additional musicians

- Joakim Brodén – vocals (1, 2, 11)
- Kenny Leckremo – vocals (6)
- Andreas Olander – rhythm guitar, backing vocals
- Hanna Berglund – backing vocals
- Barbro Beckman – backing vocals
- Twilight Choir – backing vocals

Production

- Daniele – mastering, mixing, arranging, sound design, producer
- Felipe – producer, mixing
- Christian Hedgren – additional vocal arrangements (9)
- Martin Hanford – cover art

== Charts ==
Chart (2014)	Peak position
Sverigetopplistan	29

== Notes ==
During the recording of the album, some musicians were known under different nicknames. After the album's release, several members changed their pseudonyms.
