= The Art of Metal =

Studio album by Hysterica
- Released: March 27, 2012
- Genre: Heavy metal
- Length: 39:59
- Label: Black Lodge Records

Hysterica chronology
Metalwar (2009)	The Art of Metal (2012)	All In (2015)

Professional ratings
Review scores
Source	Rating
Nya Wermlands-Tidningen	3/5 stars
Upsala Nya Tidning	4/5 stars
Metal Express Radio	9.5/10
Rock Hard	4/10

The Art of Metal is the second album by Swedish heavy metal band Hysterica.

The Swedish sculptor Bo Andersson made a 2.40 metre tall statue in conjunction with the album, taking inspiration from the album track "Force Of Metal".

== Track listing ==
1. "Breaking the Walls" - 4:01
2. "Fighters of the Century" - 3:58
3. "Live or Die" - 4:46
4. "Spirit of the Age" - 5:00
5. "Message" - 7:08
6. "Fear of the Light" - 4:06
7. "Force Of Metal" - 3:56
8. "Heels Of Steel" - 2:51
9. "Hysterica" - 4:35
10. "Daughters of the Night" - 4:52
