= Raise Hell =

Swedish thrash metal band

- Origin: Stockholm, Sweden
- Genres: Thrash metal, black metal
- Years active: 1995–present
- Label: Nuclear Blast
- Members: Jonas von Wowern; Jimmy Fjällendahl; Joakim Kulo; Niklas Sjöström; Dennis Ekdahl
- Past members: Torstein Wickberg

Raise Hell is a Swedish thrash metal band from Stockholm. The group changed names several times early on. They released the 1997 demo Nailed as In Cold Blood, which they changed to Raise Hell after signing with Nuclear Blast. After the album's release, the group toured Europe with Dismember, Children of Bodom, and others. Their second album, Not Dead Yet, was released in 1999 and produced by Anders Fridén of In Flames, followed by a tour with Destruction. After further touring and appearances at the Wacken Open Air festival, the group returned to the studio in 2002 for Wicked Is My Game. Guitarist Jonas von Wowern (Nilsson) sang on the first three albums. In 2002, singer Jimmy Fjällendahl joined the band; von Wowern focused on guitar. The group signed with Black Lodge Records in 2004; City of the Damned followed in 2006, and another tour of Europe with Necrophobic and Origin Blood followed later that year.

== Members ==
Current

- Jonas von Wowern - guitar, vocals
- Jimmy Fjällendahl - vocals (2002–present)
- Joakim Kulo - guitar
- Niklas Sjöström - bass
- Dennis Ekdahl - drums

Former

- Torsten Wickberg - guitar

== Discography ==
- Nailed (demo, 1997)
- Holy Target (Nuclear Blast, 1998)
- Not Dead Yet (Nuclear Blast, 2000)
- Wicked Is My Game (Nuclear Blast, 2002)
- City of the Damned (Black Lodge/Sound Pollution, 2006)
- Written in Blood (Black Lodge, 2015)
