= At the Heart of Wintervale =

Studio album by Twilight Force
- Released: 20 January 2023
- Genre: Symphonic power metal
- Length: 44:57
- Label: Nuclear Blast
- Producer: Lynd; Blackwald

Twilight Force chronology
Dawn of the Dragonstar (2019)	At the Heart of Wintervale (2023)

Singles from At the Heart of Wintervale
- 1. "Twilight Force" Released: 11 November 2022; 2. "Sunlight Knight" Released: 9 December 2022; 3. "Skyknights of Aldaria" Released: 17 February 2023

At the Heart of Wintervale is the fourth studio album by Swedish symphonic power metal band Twilight Force. The album was released on 20 January 2023, through Nuclear Blast. It was produced by Lynd and Blackwald. It is the final album to feature longtime members Lynd, Aerendir and Born.

== Critical reception ==
Professional ratings
Review scores
Source	Rating
Blabbermouth.net	8.5/10
Metal Storm	7.6/10

The album received generally positive reviews from critics. Dom Lawson from Blabbermouth.net gave the album 8.5 out of 10 and said: "As the late, great Freddie Mercury may or may not have said at some point: if it's worth doing, it's worth overdoing. Twilight Force's continuing adventures remain more absurdly entertaining than most."

== Track listing ==
All tracks are written by Twilight Force.

At the Heart of Wintervale track listing
No.	Title	Length
1.	"Twilight Force"	4:11
2.	"At the Heart of Wintervale"	4:50
3.	"Dragonborn"	4:00
4.	"Highlands of the Elder Dragon"	10:32
5.	"Skyknights of Aldaria"	5:13
6.	"A Familiar Memory"	1:18
7.	"Sunlight Knight"	4:28
8.	"The Last Crystal Bearer"	10:20
Total length:		44:57

Bonus tracks
No.	Title	Length
9.	"The Sapphire Dragon of Arcane Might Is Back Again"	3:35
10.	"Skyknights of Aldaria" (orchestral version)	5:14
11.	"The Last Crystal Bearer" (orchestral version)	10:20
Total length:		64:06

== Personnel ==
Twilight Force

- Allyon – lead vocals, artwork
- Lynd – lead guitar, backing vocals, acoustic guitar, lute, choir, production, mixing, mastering, cover, concept, art direction
- Aerendir – rhythm guitar, backing vocals
- Born – bass, backing vocals
- De'Azsh – drums, percussion
- Blackwald – keyboards, backing vocals, piano, violin, cembalo, narration, choir, production, engineering, mixing, mastering, cover, concept, art direction

Additional musicians

- Krysthara – choir

Additional personnel

- Simone Mularoni – mastering
- Tullius Heuer – sleeve, design
