= Transport League =

Swedish metal band

- Origin: Partille, Sweden
- Genres: Stoner metal; groove metal
- Years active: 1994–2005; 2009–present
- Labels: Mascot; Pavement; Seamiew; Metalville; Rough Trade; Rodeostar; Mighty Music; Black Lodge
- Members: Tony Jelencovich; Peter Hunyadi; Mattias Starander; Dennis Österdal
- Past members: Stitch; Ken Sandin; Stefan Carlsson; Patrik Sten; Magnus 155; Patrik Herrström; Bjarne Johansson; Martin Meyerman; Adam Magnusson; Dan J.; Johan Reivén; Lars Häglund; Christian Jansson
- Website: Transport League on Facebook

Transport League is a Swedish heavy metal band from Partille, formed in 1994. They disbanded in 2005 before reuniting in 2009. The band has released ten studio albums, with their latest, We Are Satan's People, having been released in 2024.

== History ==
The band was formed in late 1994 by guitarist and vocalist Tony Jelencovich (Icon in Me, Mnemic) as a side project to his then-band B-Thong. In 1995, the debut album Stallion Showcase was released, featuring Jelencovich, bassist Johan Reivén, and drummer Lars Häglund. Towards the end of 1996, the band toured Scandinavia.

The lineup changed for the 1997 album Superevil, with Peter Hunyadi joining as a second guitarist, Ken Sandin on bass, and Mattias Starander on drums. This lineup embarked on various tours and recorded the third album, Satanic Panic, in 2000.

Subsequent lineup changes occurred, including the brief inclusion of Patrik Sten on drums, who, after an extensive search, was found to be a good fit but ultimately did not stay. By the time of the 2003 album Multiple Organ Harvest, the band consisted of Jelencovich, drummer Stefan "Stipen" Carlsson, and guitarist Adam Magnusson.

In 2005, the band temporarily disbanded so Jelencovich could focus on other projects. One of his goals was to create opportunities for the youth in Gothenburg to enjoy heavy metal music, which led him to regularly rent out a club that exclusively played such music.

The band reunited in 2009 and, after several live performances, entered the studio with producer Roberto Laghi (In Flames, Sonic Syndicate, Mustasch), who had worked on their previous three albums. The result was the album Boogie from Hell, released independently in 2013.

== Musical style ==
The band's music is influenced by groups such as Kyuss, Fu Manchu, Led Zeppelin, Pantera, Sepultura, and Machine Head. Jelencovich cites Clutch, Pro-Pain, and Danzig as his primary influences. Transport League's music is aggressive, with technically demanding instrumentals.

== Members ==
=== Current ===
- Tony Jelencovich – guitars, vocals (1994–2005, 2009–present)
- Peter Hunyadi – guitars
- Mattias Starander – drums
- Dennis Österdal – bass (2015–present)

=== Former ===
- Stitch – bass
- Ken Sandin – bass
- Stefan Carlsson – drums
- Patrik Sten – drums
- Magnus 155 – drums
- Patrik Herrström – drums
- Bjarne Johansson – drums, bass
- Martin Meyerman – guitars
- Adam Magnusson – guitars, bass
- Dan J. – guitars, vocals
- Johan Reivén – bass (1994–1995, 2009)
- Lars Häglund – drums (1994–1995)
- Christian Jansson – bass (2001)

== Discography ==
=== Studio albums ===
- 1995: Stallion Showcase (Mascot Records)
- 1997: Superevil (Mascot Records)
- 2000: Satanic Panic (Pavement Music)
- 2003: Multiple Organ Harvest (Seamiew Records)
- 2013: Boogie from Hell (self-released)
- 2015: Napalm Bats & Suicide Dogs (Metalville, Rough Trade)
- 2017: Twist and Shout at the Devil (Rodeostar)
- 2019: A Million Volt Scream (Mighty Music)
- 2021: Kaiserschnitt (Rodeostar)
- 2024: We Are Satan's People (Black Lodge Records)

=== Other releases ===
- 2003: Grand Amputation (EP, Crash Music)
- 2003: "Disconnect Massconnect" (single, Seamiew Records)
- 2011: "Speedhead" (single, Record Union Records)
- 2014: A Diezel Smelling Aftershock (EP, Hoffa Communications)
