= Eleine =

Swedish symphonic metal band

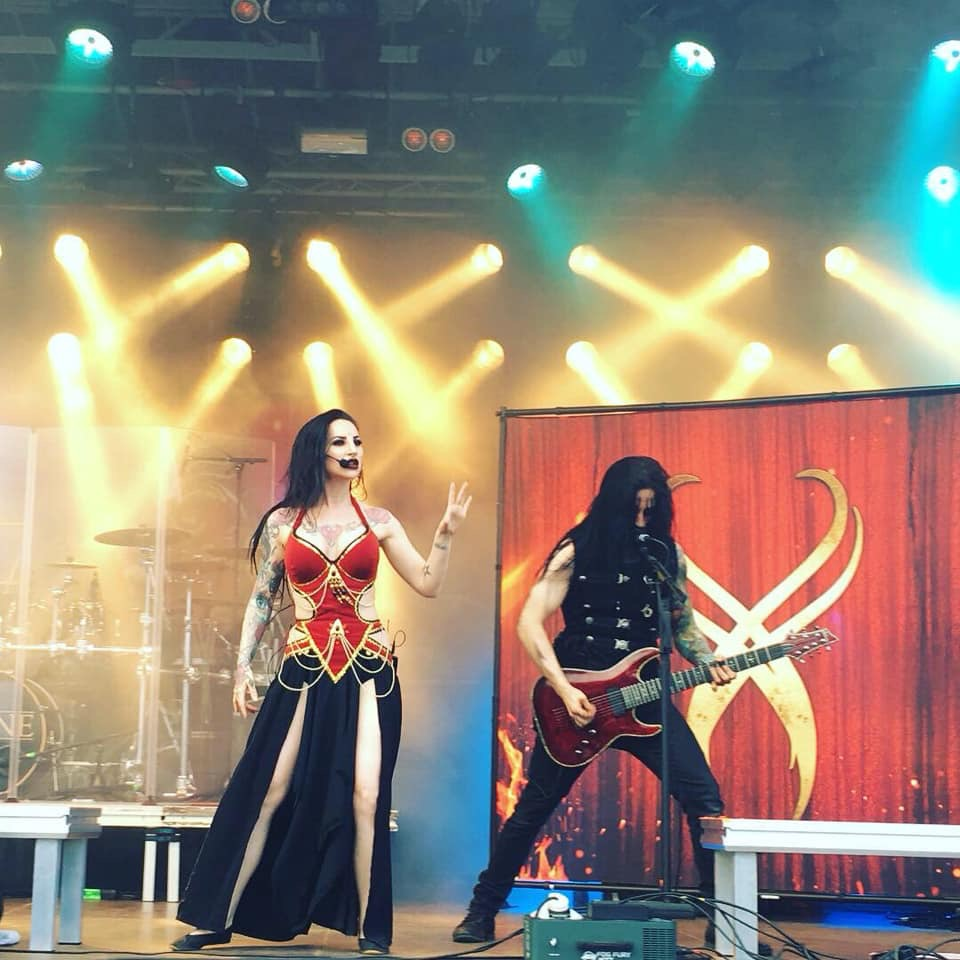

Background information
- Origin: Landskrona, Sweden
- Genres: Symphonic metal
- Years active: 2012–present
- Labels: Cardiac Records; Algoth Records; Black Lodge Records; Atomic Fire; RPM
- Members: Madeleine Liljestam; Rikard Ekberg; Victor Jonasson
- Past members: Sebastian Berglund; David Eriksson; Andreas Mårtensson; Anton Helgesson; Ludwig Dante; Jesper Sunnhagen; Filip Stålberg
- Website: www.eleine.com

Eleine is a Swedish heavy metal band formed in 2012, known for their "dark symphonic metal" sound, with influences from black metal, death metal and thrash metal.

== History ==
In 2011, vocalist Madeleine Liljestam was approached by the CEO of Cardiac Records, who "had been following (her) blog for over a year and wanted to begin a collaboration with her." They were joined by guitarist/growler and songwriter Rikard Ekberg in 2012. Christian Wolf also produced and songwrote for them. Liljestam's nickname "Eleine" was used as a name of the band. She had also been doing alternative modeling, which contributed to her image as a lead singer.

In April 2014, Eleine released their debut single and music video "Gathering Storm" after having recruited David Eriksson on drums, Sebastian Berglund on keyboards, and Andreas Mårtensson on bass in 2013. In March 2015, they released their second single "Land Beyond Sanity", and in April, they released their eponymous debut album. Liljestam describes the theme of the album as "More often than not, evil lingers in the promise of good" and that "There is always someone who ensures success and utopia when the goal is egocentric. A comforting voice which hisses tender words, where the purpose is to make you close your eyes to what is happening,"

In 2016, the band left Cardiac Records, and in June, released the single "Break Take Live". They toured with Moonspell and The Foreshadowing.

In 2017, Liljestam and Ekberg formed their own label Algoth Records, and collaborated with Black Lodge Records and Sound Pollution Distribution. They performed at several music festivals including Gefle Metal Festival, Svedala Rock and Rock It Festival. They released the single "Hell Moon (We Shall Never Die)" in 23 September and toured with W.A.S.P. in September–October. They also performed in Tokyo on 10 November for the Loud & Metal Mania festival.

In February 2018, they released their second album, Until the End. The album reached number 22 in the Swedish music charts. In May 2018, Eleine added a second guitarist Ludwig Dante. They supported Arch Enemy on the latter's Will to Power tour dates in Sweden in July, and continued touring and performing locally in Sweden. In September of the same year, the band announced Eriksson and Mårtensson's departure from the band. Dante would also depart from the band in 2019.

In 2019, the band continued touring at festivals, with drummer Jesper Sunnhagen. They released three singles: "Enemies", "Mein Herz brennt" (a cover of the Rammstein single), and "All Shall Burn", the last of which was also the name for their five-track EP released 22 November. All Shall Burn reached number 13 on the Swedish music charts. They toured with Myrath in February and March 2020 until the COVID-19 pandemic shut down the country for the final two weeks of the tour.

On 27 November 2020, the band released their third album Dancing in Hell under the Black Lodge Records label. The theme of the album is described as "shares stories of inner demons, strength and loss" Although there were news that the album reached number 2 on the Swedish hard rock albums chart and number 12 on the general albums chart, swedishcharts.com reported that Dancing reached number 60 on their album charts.

In January 2022, Eleine signed with record label Atomic Fire Records.

On 14 October 2022, they released Acoustic in Hell, an EP with acoustic renditions of eight of their tracks. They supported Sonata Arctica on their Acoustic Adventures Tour.

On 12 January 2023, the band announced Filip Stålberg as their new bassist. In April, they announced their fourth album We Shall Remain to be released on 14 July. In October of the same year, as they commenced their I Am On Tour dates, touring guitarist Victor Jonasson was announced as a permanent member of the band.

On 14 February 2025, the band announced the departures of both Jesper Sunnhagen and Filip Stålberg, citing their inappropriate behavior towards fans. On 12 June, the band announced they would release a new EP, We Stand United, on 5 September.

On March 3, 2026, the band announced a European tour in the fall that year. On 10 May 2026, the band released the single, "Empire of Lies", and simultaneously announced that their upcoming fifth studio album would be announced soon. On 1 August 2026, the band released the single, "Watch As We Rise", and simultaneously announced that their upcoming fifth studio album would be titled The Water Taste of Blood and released on 4 December 2026.

== Band members ==
Current

- Madeleine Liljestam – clean vocals (2012–present)
- Rikard Ekberg – guitars, harsh and clean vocals (2012–present)
- Victor Jonasson – guitars (2023–present; live 2021–2023)

Former

- Sebastian Berglund – keyboards (2013–2018)
- David Eriksson – drums (2013–2018)
- Andreas Mårtensson – bass (2013–2018)
- Anton Helgesson – bass (2018–2021)
- Ludwig Dante – guitars (2018–2019)
- Jesper Sunnhagen – drums (2018–2025)
- Filip Stålberg – bass (2023–2025); live 2021–2023)

== Discography ==
=== Studio albums ===
- Eleine (2015)
- Until the End (2018)
- Dancing in Hell (2020)
- We Shall Remain (2023)
- The Water Taste of Blood (2026)

=== EPs ===
- All Shall Burn (2019)
- Acoustic in Hell (2022)
- We Stand United (2025)
