= Bullet (Swedish band) =

Swedish heavy metal band

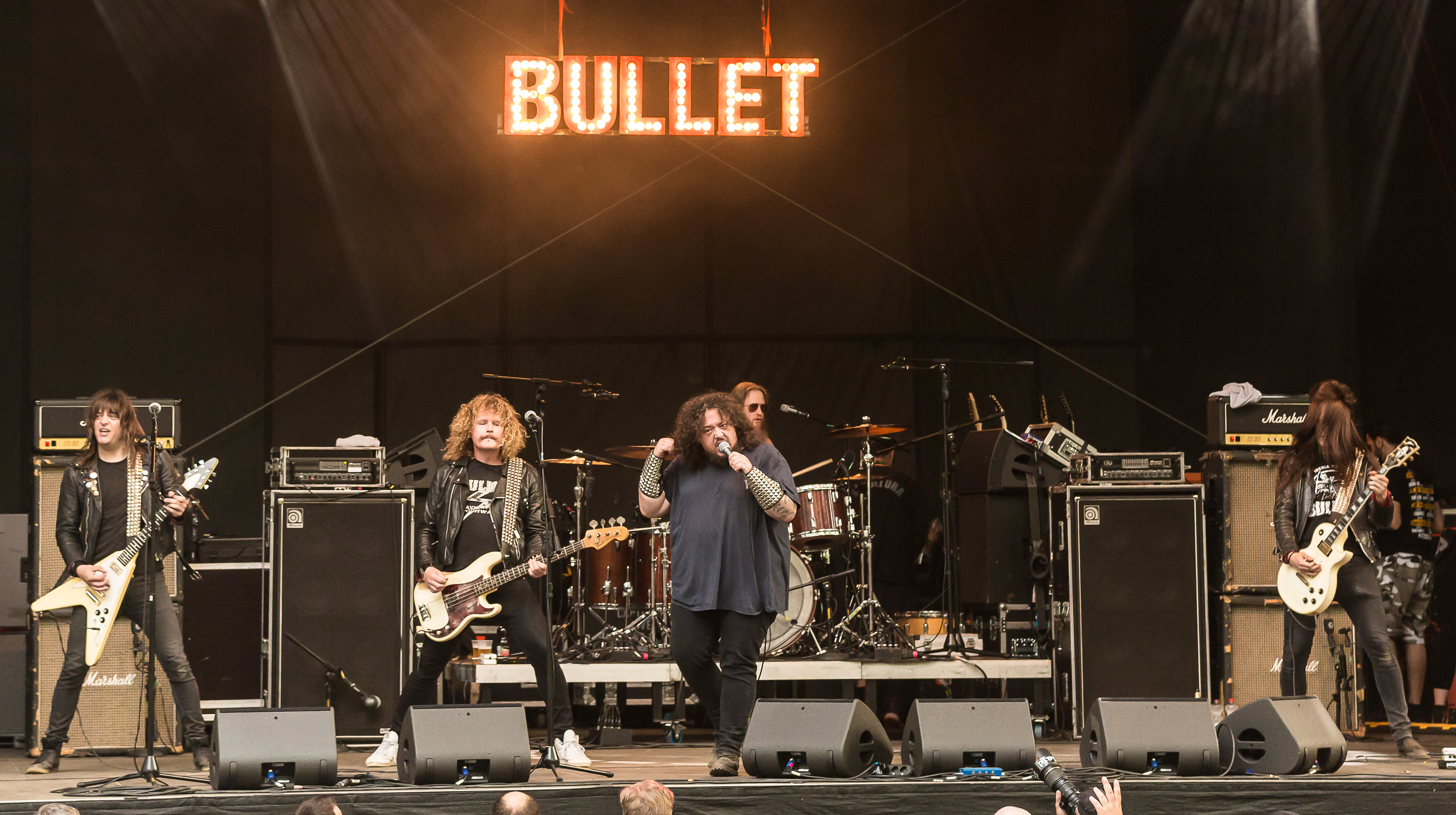
- Bullet in 2022 (from left to right: Hampus Klang, Gustav Hector, Dag Hofer, Gustav Hjortsjö, Erik Almström)

Background information
- Origin: Växjö, Sweden
- Genres: Heavy metal, hard rock
- Years active: 2001–present
- Labels: SPV/Steamhammer; Nuclear Blast; Black Lodge Records
- Members: Dag "Hell" Hofer; Hampus Klang; Gustav Hjortsjö; Gustav Hector; Freddie Johansson
- Past members: Lenny Blade; Erik Almström; Alexander Lyrbo; Adam Hector; Ben Healey (live)
- Website: bulletrock.com

Bullet is a Swedish heavy metal band, formed in Växjö in 2001 by Hampus Klang and Dag "Hell" Hofer, who began playing together in 1996 in a cover band.

Guitarist Hampus Klang has also played in the grindcore band Birdflesh. Drummer Gustav Hjortsjö previously played in the speed-thrash band Talion. Ex-bassist Adam Hector sang in the hardcore band Path of No Return.

The band has played with acts Ambush and Dead Lord, who are also from Växjö.

== Formation and early years (2001–2005) ==
Autumn 2001 – Bullet are formed in Växjö, Sweden, by guitarist Hampus Klang and vocalist Dag "Hell" Hofer. A little later, bassist Lenny Blade, second guitarist Erik Almström and drummer Gustav Hjortsjö joined the band. The band is created with the intention of playing traditional heavy metal inspired by late-1970s and early-1980s acts.

Summer 2002 – The band records and releases its first demo, Heavy Metal Highway, in a limited physical format. The demo is sold at local shows and helps Bullet establish themselves on the Swedish underground metal scene.

2003–2005 – Bullet perform extensively on club stages across Sweden and parts of Scandinavia, building a reputation as a high-energy live band while refining their original material.

== Breakthrough and first albums (2006–2008) ==
April 28, 2006 – Bullet release their debut studio album, Heading for the Top, through Black Lodge Records. The track Turn It Up Loud gains attention after being aired by Bruce Dickinson on his BBC radio show.

Summer–Autumn 2006 – Scandinavian club tour in support of Heading for the Top.

Second half of 2006 – First line-up change: Lenny Blade gave up his place on bass to Adam Hector and left for Thailand.

September 5, 2008 – The second studio album, Bite the Bullet, is released via Black Lodge. The album strengthens the band’s classic heavy metal identity.

Autumn 2008 – European promotional tour and festival appearances supporting Bite the Bullet.

== International exposure (2009) ==
June 21, 2009 – Bullet perform as a supporting act for AC/DC at Ullevi Stadium, Gothenburg, playing in front of approximately 50,000 people. The show becomes one of the most important milestones in the band’s career.

October 2009 – The band performs two songs during a pre-show event for an NHL match between Detroit Red Wings and St. Louis in Sweden, exposing Bullet to a broader, non-traditional metal audience.

== Nuclear Blast era (2011–2012) ==
Early 2011 – Bullet release their third studio album, Highway Pirates. The record expands their touring activity across continental Europe.

2011 (touring season) – Highway Pirates Tour across Germany, Austria, Switzerland, and Scandinavia.

September 25, 2012 – The fourth album, Full Pull, is released via Nuclear Blast Records, marking Bullet’s move to a major metal label with broader international distribution.

Autumn 2012 – European tour supporting Full Pull, including club shows and festival slots.

== Line-up changes and Storm of Blades (2013–2014) ==
2013 (mid-year) – Guitar line-up changes occur as Bullet prepare new material, refreshing the band’s sound for the next release: Alexander Lyrbo becomes the second guitarist.

September 3–5, 2014 – Bullet release Storm of Blades through Nuclear Blast. The album is promoted as a return to a rawer and faster heavy-metal sound.

Autumn 2014 – Early 2015 – Storm of Blades European Tour with club shows across Germany, Italy, France, and Scandinavia.

== Touring years and festivals (2015–2017) ==
2015–2017 – Bullet continue touring Europe, appearing at festivals and as support for bands such as HammerFall, Sabaton, Primal Fear, Grand Magus, Enforcer, and others, strengthening their status as a reliable live act within the traditional heavy metal scene.

2017 – Adam Hector left the band and was replaced on bass by his cousin, Gustav Hector.

== Dust to Gold and live album (2018–2019) ==
April 20, 2018 – Release of the sixth studio album Dust to Gold via SPV/Steamhammer. The album receives positive coverage for blending classic metal with modern production.

June 6, 2018 – Bullet perform at Sweden Rock Festival, presenting a set dominated by Dust to Gold material.

2018 (touring season) – Dust to Gold Tour across Europe with club and festival dates.

July 5, 2019 – Bullet release the double live album Live, documenting the band’s on-stage power after more than a decade of touring.

Summer 2019 – European festival and club dates in support of the live release.

July 25, 2019 – The band took part in the first (and probably last) heavy metal festival Big Gun, opening the event and sharing the stage with U.D.O., Rage, Bonfire, Nervosa and others. The festival was held in Serpukhov.

== Pandemic and post-pandemic period (2020–2023) ==
February 20–21 – Before the pandemic lockdowns, the band played two concerts in Tokyo (at the Shibuya Cyclone concert hall). Australian hard rock band The Babes were a special guest on this mini-tour.

2020–2021 – Touring activity slows due to the COVID-19 pandemic, although the band remains active with writing and limited performances when possible.

October 2021 – Alexander Lyrbo left the band and was replaced by Erik Almström for some subsequent concerts.

2022–2023 – Bullet gradually return to regular touring, appearing at selected festivals and rebuilding momentum for a new studio project.

== Comeback and Kickstarter campaign (2024–2025) ==
2024 (touring season) – Bullet perform selected Scandinavian festival and club shows while finalizing new studio material. A refreshed line-up including guitarist Freddie Johansson is presented.

May 30, 2025 – Appearance at MetAle Festival, Liseberg (Gothenburg), presenting a classic heavy-metal set.

October 17, 2025 – Bullet officially announce the album Kickstarter and release the title track as the first single and music video.

November 21, 2025 – Second single, Keep Rolling, is released with an accompanying video.

December 19, 2025 – Third single, Chained by Metal, is released as part of the album promotion campaign.

== Kickstarter release and touring (2026–present) ==
January 9, 2026 – Bullet release their seventh studio album, Kickstarter, via SPV/Steamhammer on CD, LP, and digital platforms.

February 2026 – Launch of the Kickstarter Tour 2026 with European dates beginning in Germany and Scandinavia.

== Also ==
Hampus Klang is one of the organisers of the Muskelrock festival. He, Bullet's former tour manager and some friends bought a disused amusement park situated 50 km outside their hometown, Alvesta, and launched the festival, initially as an all-styles one, but later decided to keep it heavy. The headliner of the first metal-only festival was Thor.

== Band members ==
=== Current line-up ===
- Dag "Hell" Hofer – vocals (2001 – present)
- Hampus Klang – guitars (2001 – present)
- Freddie Johansson – guitars (2024 – present)
- Gustav Hector – bass (2017 – present)
- Gustav Hjortsjö – drums (2002 – present)

=== Former members ===
- Lenny Blade – bass (2001 – 2006)
- Erik Almström – guitars (2001 – 2012; two live shows 2022)
- Adam Hector – bass (2006 – 2016)
- Alexander Lyrbo – guitars (2013 – 2021)

== Discography ==
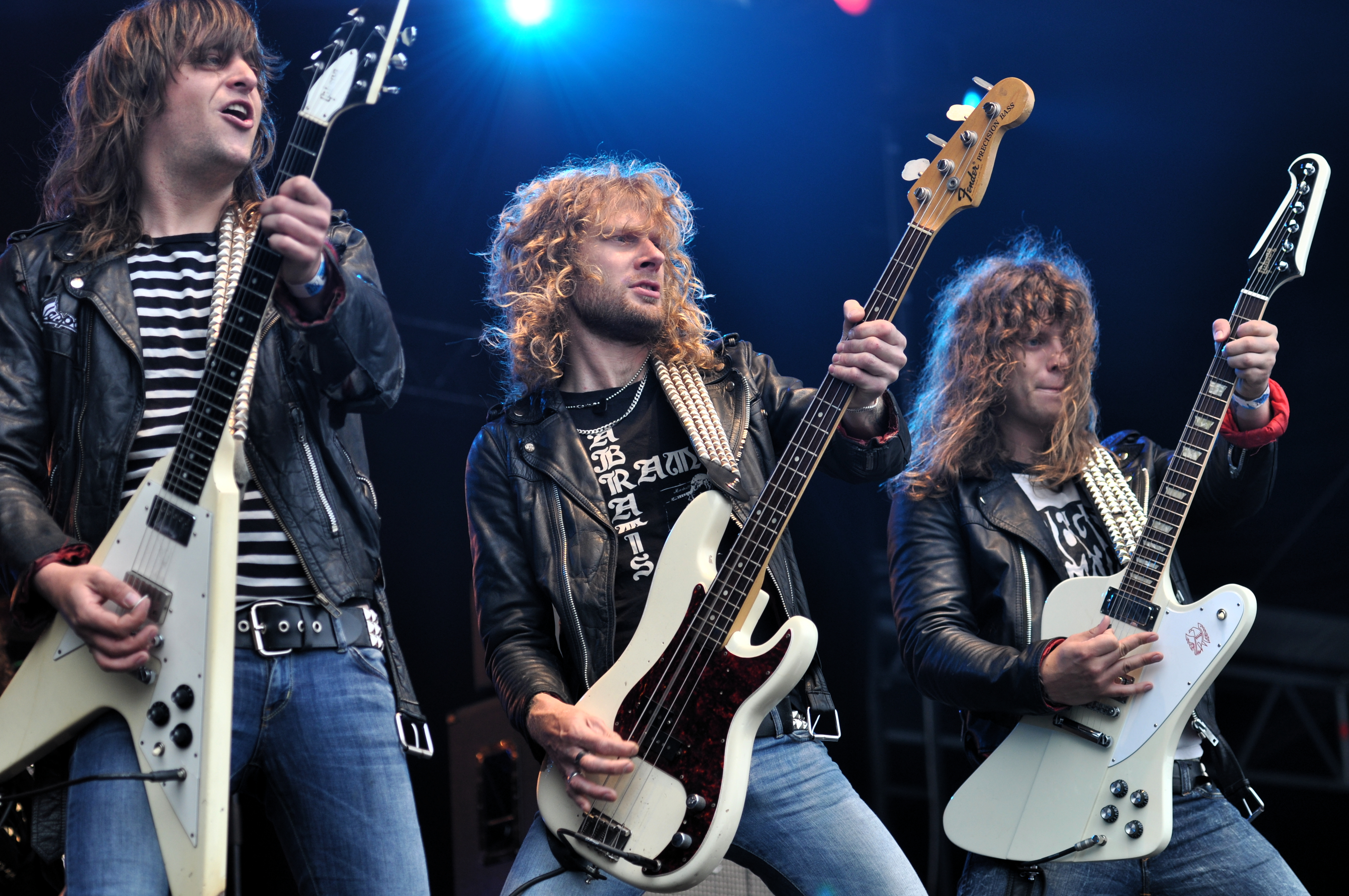
Bullet at Rock am Ring 2013 (from left to right: Hampus Klang, Adam Hector, Alexander Lyrbo)

=== Albums ===
- Heading for the Top (2006)
- Bite the Bullet (2008)
- Highway Pirates (2011)
- Full Pull (2012)
- Storm of Blades (2014)
- Dust to Gold (2018)
- Kickstarter (2026)

=== Live albums ===
- Live (2019)

=== 7" singles & EPs ===
- "Speeding in the Night" EP (2003)
- "Full Pull" (2012)
- "Storm of Blades" (2014)
- "High Roller" (Enforcer) / "Back on the Road" (Bullet)
