= Dawn of the Dragonstar =

2019 album by Twilight Force

Studio album by Twilight Force
- Released: 16 August 2019
- Recorded: 2016–2019
- Studio: The Twilight Forge; Valley Sound Studio; Mediehuset; The Grosvenor Room
- Genre: Symphonic power metal
- Length: 57:21
- Label: Nuclear Blast
- Producer: Lynd; Blackwald

Twilight Force chronology
Heroes of Mighty Magic (2016)	Dawn of the Dragonstar (2019)	At the Heart of Wintervale (2023)

Dawn of the Dragonstar is the third studio album by Swedish symphonic power metal band Twilight Force. It was released on 16 August 2019. It is the band's second album with Nuclear Blast Records, the first to feature vocalist Allyon, and the last to feature drummer Daniel Sjögren as De'Azsh. On 7 June 2019, the band revealed the first single from the album, "Night of Winterlight".

== Recording and production ==
Most guitar solos on the album were recorded with a Fender Stratocaster tuned in fourths, which guitarist Lynd states "opened up a whole new world of possibilities for my playing". Compared to the previous albums released by the band, the recording process was slightly different: with Chrileon, all members of the band were in close proximity in Sweden. With Allyon, a native Italian, the band had to work around this. In a 2018 interview, the band gave an in-character response that "the dragons are swift and reliable. Distance is of little concern in this day and age. Dragons and Town Portal Scrolls are equally efficient in times of need."

== Artwork ==
Like the band's last album, cover artwork was designed by Kerem Beyit. The band believes that the artwork "brilliantly captures the adventurous and magical world of the Twilight Kingdoms; and a sparkling adventure it shall be indeed."

== Track listing ==
All tracks are written by Blackwald and Lynd.

No.	Title	Length
1.	"Dawn of the Dragonstar"	3:37
2.	"Thundersword"	4:58
3.	"Long Live the King"	4:22
4.	"With the Light of a Thousand Suns"	6:53
5.	"Winds of Wisdom"	5:35
6.	"Queen of Eternity"	5:02
7.	"Valley of the Vale"	3:44
8.	"Hydra"	5:34
9.	"Night of Winterlight"	5:07
10.	"Blade of Immortal Steel"	12:29
Total length:		57:21

Digibook and vinyl bonus disc
No.	Title	Length
1.	"The Power of the Ancient Force" (Hanna Turi version)	4:58
2.	"With the Light of a Thousand Suns" (orchestral version)	6:52
3.	"Enchanted Dragon of Wisdom" (2007 demo version)	4:44
4.	"Forest of Destiny" (2007 demo version)	4:30

== Personnel ==
Twilight Force

- Aerendir – rhythm guitars
- Allyon – lead and backing vocals
- Born – bass guitar
- Blackwald – keyboards, violin, cembalo, orchestrations, narration, choir vocals, mastering, mixing, arranging, sound design, production, cover concept, art direction, lore
- Lynd – lead guitar, acoustic guitar, lute, backing vocals, choir vocals and arrangements, orchestrations, production, mixing, cover concept, art direction
- De'Azsh – drums, percussion

Additional musicians

- Tommy Johansson – backing vocals on "Thundersword"
- Hossein Manafi-Rasi – avaz on "With the Light of a Thousand Suns"
- Ylva Eriksson – choir vocals on "With the Light of a Thousand Suns" and "Queen of Eternity"
- Andreas Olander – rhythm guitars on "Valley of the Vale"
- Kristin Starkey – choir

Production

- Simone Mularoni – mastering
- Kerem Beyit – cover art, design
- Hanna Turi – sleeve design, choir vocals
- Fotograf Helene – photography

== Charts ==
Chart (2019)	Peak position
German Albums (Offizielle Top 100)	43
Swiss Albums (Schweizer Hitparade)	36
