= Until the End (Eleine album) =

Studio album by Eleine
- Released: February 23, 2018
- Studio: Wiss Music Production
- Genre: Symphonic metal
- Length: 43:22
- Label: Black Lodge
- Producer: Eleine

Eleine chronology
Eleine (2015)	Until the End (2018)	Dancing in Hell (2020)

Professional ratings
Review scores
Source	Rating
Dead Rhetoric	9/10
Hallowed	4/7
Soundscape	8/10

Until the End is the second studio album by the Swedish symphonic metal band Eleine. The album featured five singles, in the form of three music videos for the tracks "Hell Moon (We Shall Never Die)", "Break Take Live" and "Echoes", and two lyric videos for "Sanity" and "Whisper My Child". The album peaked at number 22 on the Swedish album charts.

== Track listing ==
All tracks are written by Eleine.

Standard Edition
No.	Title	Length
1.	"Story Untold"	5:05
2.	"Echoes"	4:06
3.	"Sanity"	3:59
4.	"From the Grave"	4:13
5.	"Whisper My Child"	3:54
6.	"Until the End"	4:51
7.	"Please"	4:02
8.	"Another Rite"	4:05
9.	"Hell Moon (We Shall Never Die)"	4:30
10.	"Prelude: Arise" (Instrumental)	0:41
11.	"Break Take Live"	3:56
Total length:		43:22

Japanese edition bonus track
No.	Title	Length
12.	"Story Untold (symphonic version)"	5:01
Total length:		48:23

== Personnel ==
Credits adapted from the album's liner notes.

- Madeleine Liljestam – vocals
- Rikard Ekberg – guitar, growl, vocals
- Andreas Mårtensson – bass
- David Eriksson – drums
- Sebastian Berglund – keyboards

Production

- Produced by Eleine
- Mixed and co-recorded by Erik Wiss at Wiss Music Production and Eleine
- Mastered at The Panic Room

== Charts ==
Chart (2018)	Peak position
Swedish Albums (Sverigetopplistan)	22
