= Metalwar =

- The cover of Metalwar

Studio album by Hysterica
- Released: February 20, 2009
- Genre: Heavy metal
- Length: 39:59
- Label: Crong Records

Hysterica chronology
Hysterica (2006)	Metalwar (2009)	The Art of Metal (2012)

Metalwar is the first album by Swedish heavy metal band Hysterica.

== Reception ==
Professional ratings
Review scores
Source	Rating
Metal Hammer Germany	Unfavourable
Nöjesguiden	4/6 stars
Imperiumi	7/10
Metal.de	5/10
Metalitalia.com	4.5/10
Powermetal.de	6.5/10
Rock Hard	6/10

In the Swedish mainstream press, the album received a negative review from Nya Wermlands-Tidningen for its "hailstorm of clichés", otherwise moderate to mildly positive reviews.

== Track listing ==
1. "We Are The Undertakers" - 3:20
2. "Halloween" - 3:43
3. "Bless The Beast" - 3:47
4. "Girls Made Of Heavy Metal" - 3:08
5. "Louder" - 2:49
6. "Metalwar" - 3:45
7. "Wreck Of Society" - 4:39
8. "The Bitch Is Back" - 3:04
9. "Got The Devil In Me" - 4:23
10. "Heavy Metal Man" - 3:38
11. "Pain In The Ass" - 3:48
