= Heroes of Mighty Magic =

2016 album by Twilight Force

Studio album by Twilight Force
- Released: 26 August 2016 (Worldwide); 25 January 2017 (Japan)
- Recorded: 2013–2016
- Studio: The Twilight Forge; Gravitone Studios; Vika Kyrka; Mediehuset
- Genre: Symphonic power metal
- Length: 70:16
- Label: Nuclear Blast Records
- Producer: Lynd; Blackwald

Twilight Force chronology
Tales of Ancient Prophecies (2014)	Heroes of Mighty Magic (2016)	Dawn of the Dragonstar (2019)

Singles from Heroes of Mighty Magic
- 1. "Battle of Arcane Might" Released: 8 July 2016

Heroes of Mighty Magic is the second studio album by Swedish symphonic power metal band Twilight Force, released internationally on 26 August 2016. It is the band's first album with Nuclear Blast Records. The band describes the album as a step up from their debut in every way, most notably in the increased use of symphonic, orchestral, and operatic elements in their songs. It is the second and last album by the band to feature Chrileon on vocals, before he was replaced by Alessandro Conti in June 2018.

== Composition ==
Elements of Heroes of Mighty Magic had been laid out for years – even before the band's first record. The lore of the characters, world, and stories within the album were all the work of Blackwald, who is also one of the primary songwriters and lyricists. Initially, the album was a loose collection of songs that Lynd and Blackwald had written several years before Heroes of Mighty Magic's release, and some even dating back before Tales of Ancient Prophecies. release. As the tracks came together and the writing was nearing completion, the band set out to create something they could look back on in several years and be proud of. The band was inspired heavily by fantasy novels and video games, such as the works of J.R.R. Tolkien and Isaac Asimov. Most notably, the album's name was derived from the video game series Heroes of Might and Magic, though Blackwald and Lynd have noted the influence of other fantasy video games as well, such as World of Warcraft.

== Recording and production ==
"We've put all our knowledge to the test, with everything from orchestration, arranging, performances, and mixing. It's been a long and exciting journey, but also incredibly challenging to everyone. We have worked very hard to create a real adventure, both through tonality, storytelling, and even sound design. We wanted to create more than just a collection of discoherent tracks."

—Lynd, 2016

Access to a larger record label was a driving factor in the production and the creation of the new record. During this time period, Twilight Force also acquired their own recording studio known as the Twilight Forge. Although the album's concept had existed for years beforehand, Nuclear Blast Records and the band's personal studio set the groundwork for the content of the album to be fully realized. Additionally, it allowed the band to mix, master, and record tracks and parts at their own pace, without any major deadlines to meet. Members of the band were able to take as long as they wanted to tweak and adjust individual parts of songs. Additionally, the band's primary songwriters and producers, Lynd and Blackwald, were able to push their talents to new heights and experiment with new styles, like orchestration and opera. Compared to their previous record, the production quality of Heroes of Mighty Magic was ramped up significantly, involving four different studios in several different countries and nearly twenty separate personnel working on the project. The band also enlisted the help of an orchestra and a choir for some tracks.

== Artwork ==
Lynd and Blackwald handled the concept art and the art direction for the album and the booklet, although the final character designs, emblem designs, and cover art was done by Kerem Beyit. Blackwald designed the map of the Twilight Kingdoms featured in the album booklet. Many locations found throughout the Kingdoms lyrically tie into the band's overarching concept and story. The album's booklet also contains detailed character portraits, statistics, classes, races, and items that each band member wields, displayed in a manner similar to a tabletop role-playing game character sheet. In addition, the booklet includes detailed character descriptions and backstories, describing each character's personality, origins, and abilities in great detail. To tie into the character descriptions found in the booklet, a series of videos narrated by Blackwald were released by Nuclear Blast Records, explaining the origins and lore of the characters in the band. All of the contents of the booklet, including the lyrics, were written by Blackwald.

== Track listing ==
All tracks are written by Blackwald and Lynd

No.	Title	Length
1.	"Battle of Arcane Might"	5:06
2.	"Powerwind"	5:16
3.	"Guardian of the Seas"	5:38
4.	"Flight of the Sapphire Dragon"	5:40
5.	"There and Back Again"	10:13
6.	"Riders of the Dawn"	3:43
7.	"Keepers of Fate"	5:37
8.	"Rise of a Hero"	5:12
9.	"To the Stars"	5:32
10.	"Heroes of Mighty Magic"	9:55
11.	"Epilogue"	6:39
12.	"Knights of Twilight's Might"	1:45
Total length:		70:16

Bonus CD
No.	Title	Length
1.	"Rise of a Hero (Orchestral Version)"	5:13
2.	"Flight of the Sapphire Dragon (Orchestral Version)"	5:40
3.	"Heroes of Mighty Magic (Orchestral Version)"	9:54
4.	"Battle of Arcane Might (Karaoke Version)"	5:06
5.	"There and Back Again (Short Version)"	4:58
6.	"Powerwind (Chip Version)"	4:37
Total length:		35:28

Japanese bonus disc
No.	Title	Length
1.	"Battle of Arcane Might (Karaoke Version)"
2.	"Powerwind (Karaoke Version)"
3.	"Guardian of the Seas (Karaoke Version)"
4.	"Flight of the Sapphire Dragon (Karaoke Version)"
5.	"There and Back Again (Karaoke Version)"
6.	"Riders of the Dawn (Karaoke Version)"
7.	"Keepers of Fate (Karaoke Version)"
8.	"Rise of a Hero (Karaoke Version)"
9.	"To the Stars (Karaoke Version)"
10.	"Heroes of Mighty Magic (Karaoke Version)"
11.	"There and Back Again feat. Ylva Eriksson (Live Version)"

== Personnel ==
Twilight Force

- Aerendir – rhythm guitar, backing vocals (2, 8, 9)
- Born – bass guitar, backing vocals (2, 8, 9)
- Blackwald – keyboards, piano, violin, cembalo, narration, backing vocals, orchestration
- Chrileon – lead vocals
- Lynd – lead guitar, acoustic guitar, lute, backing vocals, choir arrangements, orchestration
- De'Azsh – drums, percussion, backing vocals (2, 8, 9)

Additional musicians

- Joakim Brodén – vocals (10)
- Fabio Lione – vocals (5)
- Ylva Eriksson – vocals (Bonus disc, 11)
- Borganäskören – choir (12)
- Andreas Olander – rhythm guitar
- Hjalmar Lundblad – vocals (8)
- Sangeeta Chauhan – backing vocals (2)
- Sara Lindberg – backing vocals (8, 9)
- Jens Prahl – backing vocals (2)
- Hanna Turi – backing vocals
- Twilight Choir – backing vocals

Production

- Blackwald – mastering, mixing, arranging, sound design, producer
- Lynd – producer, mixing, arranging
- Marcus Moszny – conducting
- Kerem Beyit – cover art

== Charts ==
Chart (2016)	Peak position
UK (Rock & Metal Albums)	20
UK (Independent Albums)	41
Belgian Albums (Ultatrop Flanders)	200
Belgian Albums (Ultatrop Wallonia)	101
German Albums	54
Sverigetopplistan	44
