= Dust to Gold (Bullet album) =

Studio album by Bullet
- Released: 20 April 2018
- Genre: Heavy metal
- Length: 38:51
- Label: SPV/Steamhammer

Bullet chronology
Storm of Blades (2014)	Dust to Gold (2018)	Kickstarter (2026)

Dust to Gold is the sixth full-length album by the Swedish heavy metal band Bullet, released on 20 April 2018 through SPV/Steamhammer.

== Reception ==
The album received a perfect 10 score from Metal Forces, as well as other strong reviews such as 9 of 10 and 8 of 10 internationally. Some also gave 7 out of 10.

In the band's native Sweden, the album both received 8/10 or 4/5 as well as 4 out of 6. With Dust to Gold, Bullet was seen as a stalwart of Swedish heavy metal.

== Track listing ==
1. "Speed and Attack" – 2:35
2. "Ain't Enough" – 2:38
3. "Rogue Soldier" – 3:01
4. "Fuel the Fire" – 3:26
5. "One More Round" – 3:07
6. "Highway Love" – 3:22
7. "Wildfire" – 4:00
8. "Screams in the Night" – 2:50
9. "Forever Rise" – 4:04
10. "The Prophecy" – 0:28
11. "Hollow Grounds" – 3:49
12. "Dust to Gold" – 5:31
