= We Shall Remain (album) =

Studio album by Eleine
- Released: July 14, 2023
- Genre: Symphonic metal
- Length: 36:52
- Label: Atomic Fire
- Producers: Rikard Ekberg, Madeleine "Eleine" Liljestam

Eleine chronology
Dancing in Hell (2020)	We Shall Remain (2023)	The Water Taste of Blood (2026)

Singles from The Story Remains
- 1. "We Are Legion" Released: 24 March 2023; 2. "Never Forget" Released: 22 April 2023

We Shall Remain is the fourth studio album by Swedish symphonic metal band Eleine, released on 14 July 2023 via Atomic Fire Records. A visualizer video was released for "Never Forget". It is their last album with drummer Jesper Sunnhagen and their only album with bassist Filip Stålberg, both of whom were fired due to misconduct towards fans. In support of the album, the band embarked on a tour entitled I Am On Tour, with touring guitarist Victor Jonasson who was then announced as a permanent member of the band.

== Track listing ==
All tracks are written by Eleine.

We Shall Remain track listing
No.	Title	Length
1.	"Never Forget"	4:34
2.	"Stand by the Flame"	4:23
3.	"We Are Legion"	3:41
4.	"Promise of Apocalypse"	3:50
5.	"Blood in Their Eyes"	3:18
6.	"Vemod" (Instrumental)	0:55
7.	"Through the Mist"	3:55
8.	"Suffering"	4:30
9.	"War Das Alles"	3:26
10.	"We Shall Remain"	4:20
Total length:		36:52

== Personnel ==
- Madeleine Liljestam – lead vocals
- Rikard Ekberg – guitar, growled vocals
- Filip Stålberg – bass
- Jesper Sunnhagen – drums

Production

- Produced by Rikard Ekberg and Madeleine "Eleine" Liljestam
- Recorded, mixed, and mastered by Thomas "Plec" Johansson at The Panic Room, Skövde, Sweden
