= Dancing in Hell =

Studio album by Eleine
- Released: November 27, 2020
- Genre: Symphonic metal
- Length: 45:16
- Label: Black Lodge
- Producers: Rikard Ekberg, Madeleine "Eleine" Liljestam

Eleine chronology
| Until the End (2018) | Dancing in Hell (2020) | We Shall Remain (2023) |

Dancing in Hell is the third studio album by Swedish symphonic metal band Eleine, released on 27 November 2020 via Black Lodge Records. The theme of the album is described as "stories of inner demons, strength and loss". Although there were news that the album reached number 2 on the Swedish hard rock albums chart and number 12 on the general albums chart, swedishcharts.com reported that Dancing in Hell reached number 60 on their album charts.

== Track listing ==
All tracks are written by Eleine.

Dancing in Hell track listing
| No. | Title | Length |
|---|---|---|
| 1. | "Enemies" | 5:22 |
| 2. | "Dancing in Hell" | 5:06 |
| 3. | "Ava of Death" | 4:06 |
| 4. | "Crawl from the Ashes" | 4:02 |
| 5. | "As I Breathe" | 3:54 |
| 6. | "Memoriam" | 6:15 |
| 7. | "Where Your Rotting Corpse Lie" | 5:55 |
| 8. | "All Shall Burn" | 4:21 |
| 9. | "Die from Within" | 4:40 |
| 10. | "The World We Knew" (Instrumental) | 1:35 |
| Total length: | | 45:16 |

Bonus track
| No. | Title | Length |
|---|---|---|
| 11. | "Die from Within" (symphonic version) | 4:34 |
| Total length: | | 49:50 |

== Personnel ==
- Madeleine Liljestam – lead vocals
- Rikard Ekberg – guitar, growled vocals
- Anton Helgesson – bass
- Jesper Sunnhagen – drums
- Ludwig Dante Blaesild – additional guitar on tracks 1 and 8

Production

- Produced by Rikard Ekberg and Madeleine "Eleine" Liljestam
- Recorded, mixed, and mastered by Thomas "Plec" Johansson at The Panic Room, Skövde, Sweden

== Charts ==
| Chart (2020) | Peak position |
|---|---|
| Swedish Albums (Sverigetopplistan) | 60 |
