= To the Stars: Costa Rica in NASA =

Book by Bruce James Callow and Ana Luisa Monge Naranjo

- First Spanish edition
- Author: Bruce James Callow, Ana Luisa Monge Naranjo
- Language: Spanish
- Genre: Non-fiction
- Publisher: Editorial Tecnológica de Costa Rica
- Publication date: 2018

To the Stars: Costa Rica in NASA (2018) is a book by Canadian writer Bruce James Callow and Costa Rican writer Ana Luisa Monge Naranjo published by Editorial Tecnológica de Costa Rica. The book documents the lives of the Costa Ricans who have worked for the National Aeronautics and Space Administration (NASA) up to the date of the book's publication.

== Story ==
The stories documented in the book share common themes including triumph over adversity and the importance of perseverance when faced with seemingly impossible obstacles. The book is laid out in an easy to read interview format making it accessible to young readers looking for career paths to aerospace careers. To the Stars: Costa Rica in NASA reveals the diversity of the important jobs Costa Ricans perform at NASA which serves as a source of pride and inspiration including in the wider Hispanic community. The public, and in particular educators focused on STEAM, have responded very positively to the book, both in Costa Rica and other countries including Canada, The USA and Mexico.

== Outreach ==
Since the book was published in August 2018 the authors have embarked on an ongoing outreach program to share the positive messages as widely as possible. As of March 2020 over 60 workshops and web conferences had been delivered including a presentation at the Space Explorers Education Conference (SEEC)#SEEC2020 in Houston Texas, with the participation of Sandra Cauffman, acting director of NASA's Earth Science Division. A high priority of the authors is to reach out to under-serviced populations and they have done workshops with students in Canadian First Nations communities, orphanages and in a center for underage mothers. The NASA Costa Ricans including engineers Andres Mora and Alfredo Valverde and oceanographer Joaquin Chaves have spoken to students at their workshops several times via web conferences.
