= Hysterica =

Swedish heavy metal band

- Origin: Stockholm, Sweden
- Genre: Heavy metal
- Years active: 2005–present
- Label: Crong Records
- Members: Anni De Vil (Vocals); Bitchie (Guitar); SatAnica (Bass); Hell'n (Drums); Scarie (Guitar)
- Past members: MaryDeath (Keyboard); RockZilla (Guitar); Xotica (Bass); Electra (Keyboard); Sinderella (Liv Jagrell) (Vocals)

Hysterica is a heavy metal band from Stockholm, Sweden. The band was founded in 2005. They recorded their first demo in 2006. After several years of playing live gigs, they released their first album Metalwar in 2009, and have since made two more albums.

== Discography ==
=== Albums ===
- Metalwar (2009)
- The Art of Metal (2012)
- All In (2015)

=== Demos ===
- Hysterica (2006)
