= Joakim Brodén =

Swedish heavy metal singer (born; 1980)

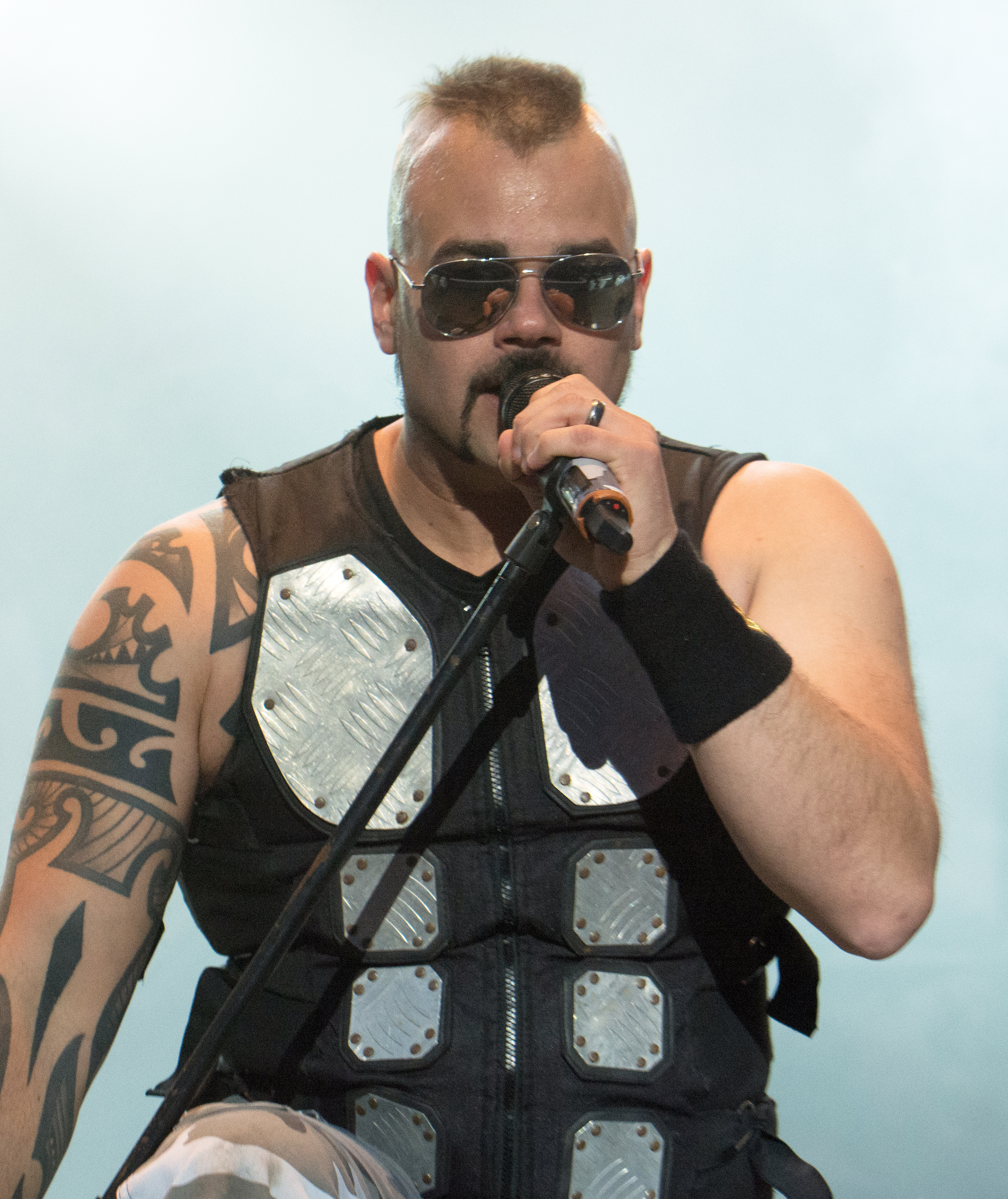
- Brodén performing with Sabaton at Elbriot 2016

Background information
- Also known as: Jocke
- Born: 5 October 1980 (age 46); Falun, Sweden
- Genre: Power metal
- Occupations: Singer; musician; songwriter
- Instruments: Vocals; keyboards; guitar
- Years active: 1999–present
- Member of: Sabaton

Joakim "Jocke" Brodén (born 5 October 1980) is a Swedish-Czech musician who is the lead vocalist, keyboardist and occasional rhythm guitarist of the power metal band Sabaton. He and bassist Pär Sundström formed the band in 1999. He holds both Swedish and Czech citizenship.

== Early life ==
Brodén's father, Ulf Olof Brodén, is from Sweden, and his mother, Anna, is from the former Czechoslovakia. He holds dual citizenship in Sweden and the Czech Republic. He has said that he became a metalhead when he was three or four years old because of the music video for Twisted Sister's "We're Not Gonna Take It". He was a competitive swimmer in his youth.

== Career ==
Brodén once joined Stormwind for a tour as a keyboard player. He founded Sabaton in 1999 with bassist Pär Sundström. He is the lead vocalist and keyboardist and an occasional third guitarist. Brodén is also the one who came up with the name "Sabaton" for the band. A sabaton is an armour piece worn on the foot.

Brodén is known for wearing an unusual vest with metal plates when performing with Sabaton; it has been described as resembling a bulletproof vest. He is also known for his distinctive mohawk hairstyle and "squared" facial hair. He is a baritone.

In 2015, Brodén lost a bet with his bandmates that committed him to travelling to Sabaton's next gig on foot; he had not realized their next engagement was in Trondheim, Norway, some 350 miles (560 km) away. Brodén stayed in the homes of several fans along the way.

On 26 November 2016, Brodén entered the Český slavík singing competition in the Czech Republic and was voted into fifth place with 9,286 points. The next year he entered again, but was removed from the competition due to a new rule that competitors had to primarily perform in the Czech Republic.

== Personal life ==
In 2016 and 2017, Brodén took part in the Swedish national pinball championships, placing 167th the first time and 255th the second time.

== Discography ==
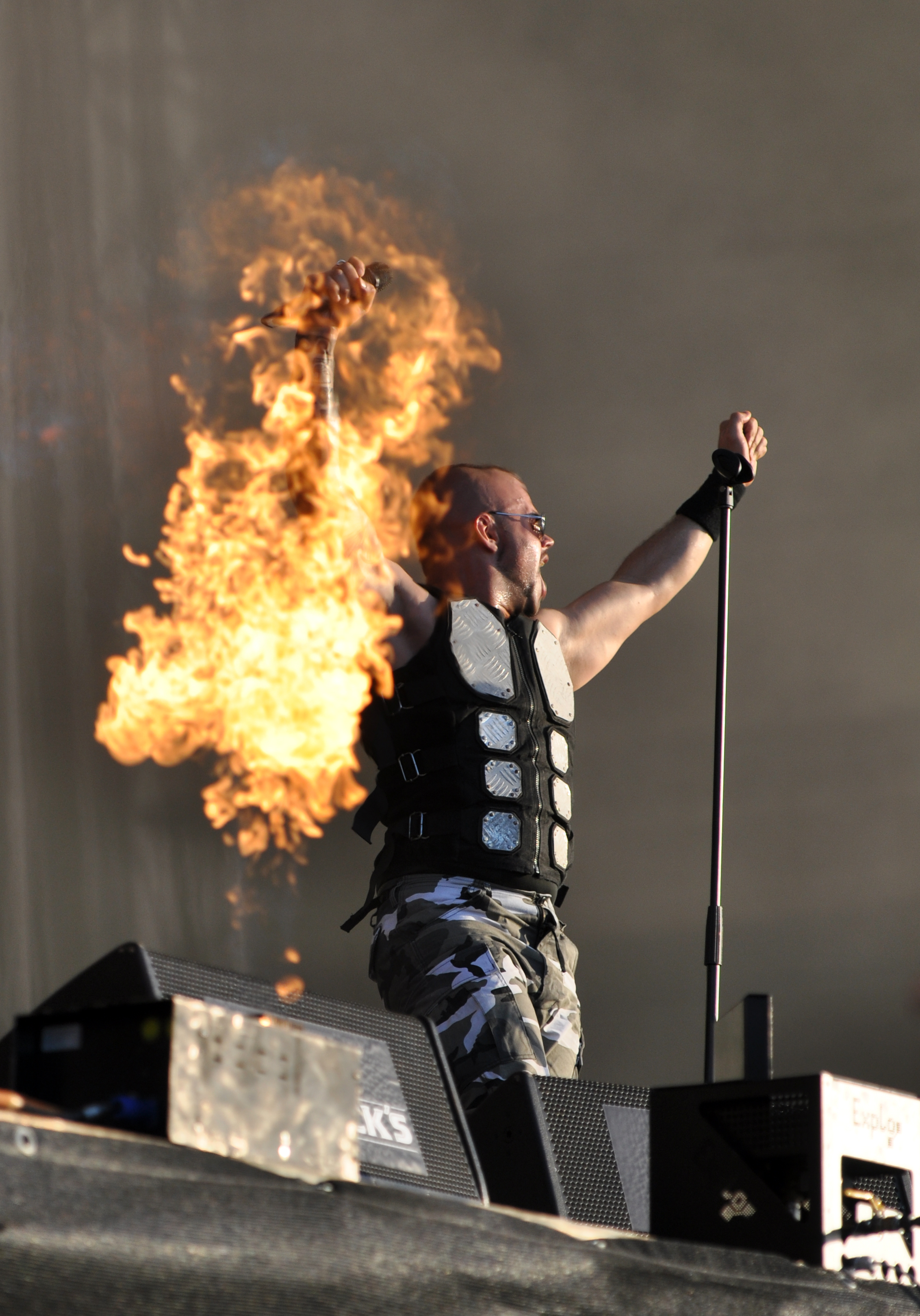
Brodén performing at Wacken Open Air in 2013

=== Guest appearances ===
Title	Band
"Lament for Soldier's Glory"	Desert
"Gates of Glory"	Twilight Force
"Rise of the Wise"	Wisdom
"Primo Victoria" (Sabaton cover)	Van Canto
"Call Me"	Pain
"Ibor & Aio"	Hulkoff
"Pumping Iron Power"	Grailknights
"Heroes of Mighty Magic"	Twilight Force
"Oh! Majinai"	Babymetal
"I Am a Viking"	Thobbe Englund
"The Tired Hero"	The Metal Alliance
"Live or Die"	Apocalyptica
"Pasadena 1994"	Nanowar of Steel
"Starlight"	Follow the Cipher
