= Twilight Force =

Swedish symphonic power metal band

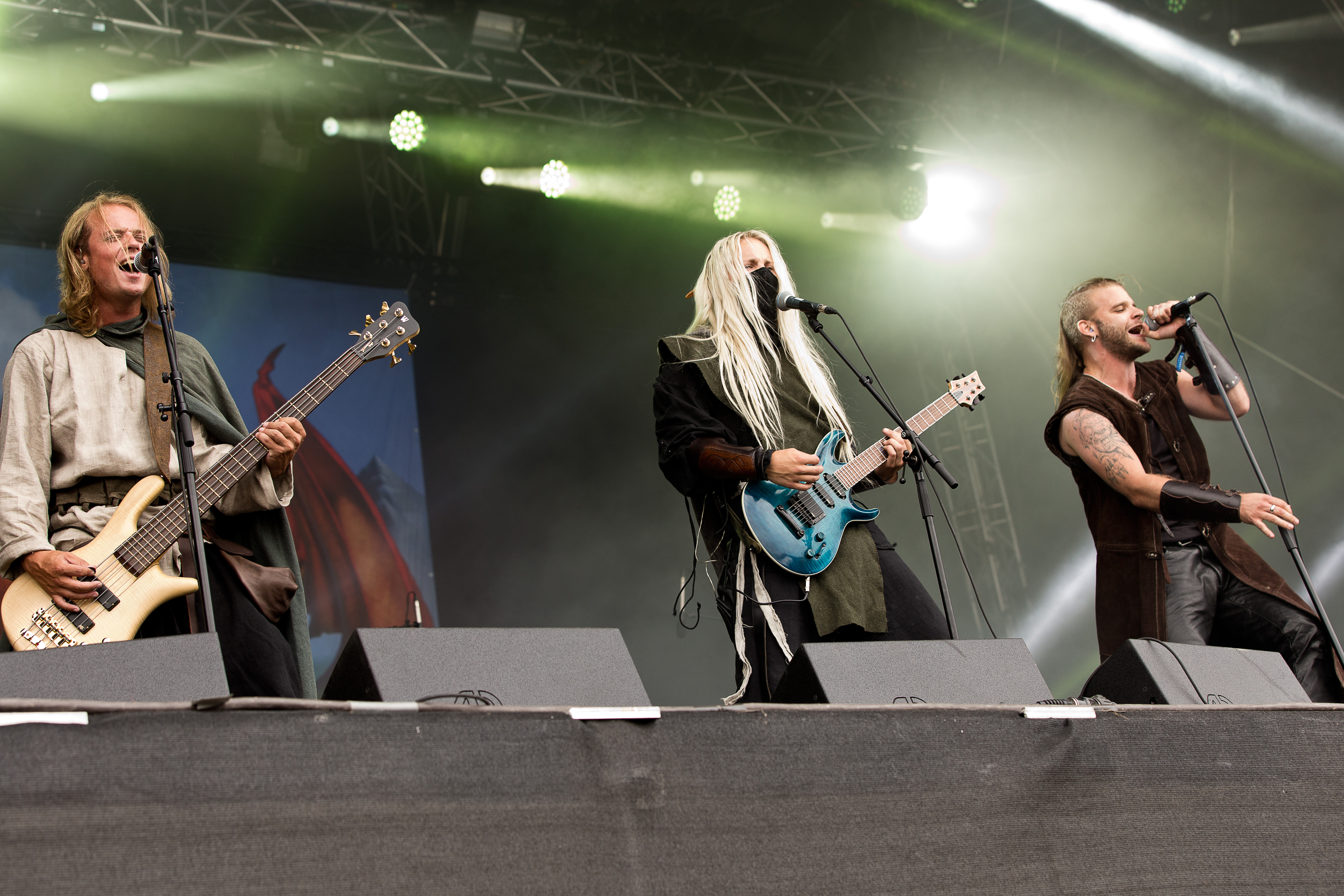
- Twilight Force at Rockharz Open Air 2016

Background information
- Origin: Falun / Borlänge, Sweden
- Genres: Symphonic power metal
- Years active: 2011–present
- Labels: Black Lodge; Nuclear Blast; Napalm
- Members: Daniel Beckman; Alessandro Conti; Isak Olsson; Kristin Starkey; Galen Stapley; Bradley Hall; Alex Miles
- Past members: Philip Lindh; Robban Bäck; Christian Eriksson; Daniel Sjögren; Jocke Leandro Johansson; Dunder Björn Lundqvist

Twilight Force is a Swedish symphonic power metal band known for their highly fantastical lyrics and LARP-style outfits which the band performs onstage in. The band's main lyrical themes are based on the lore of a fictional world known as The Twilight Kingdoms, created by keyboardist Daniel Beckman. The band has released four studio albums to date.

The band members play under the use of nicknames, and wear costumes on stage that mirror the band's lyrical themes. The group describes themselves as "adventure metal," in part due to the use of costumes, props, and demeanor onstage. The band has cited early role-playing games like Heroes of Might & Magic and table-top role-playing games like Dungeons & Dragons as inspiration for their appearance.

== History ==
The idea behind Twilight Force was conceived in the mid-2000s by guitarist Philip Lindh and keyboardist Daniel Beckman. Although the project at the time was mostly conceptual, the two would go on to write much of the material that can be found on Twilight Force's first two albums even before they had actually formed the band in 2011. Some of these songs did not make the cut for the first album, and would instead be used in later works. Beckman, a lecturer, musician, and sound technician, was often touring or working with other acts, and at the time, vocalist Christian Eriksson (then known as Christian Hedgren) was living in Los Angeles, California. For this reason, Lindh and Beckman's project remained dormant for a few years until 2013, when the rest of the members were able to commit to the band. A recording studio in Beckman's home, colloquially dubbed the "Twilight Forge", was a major step in allowing band members to record, mix, and master tracks freely.

Shortly after, bassist Dunder Björn Lundqvist, guitarist Jocke Leandro Johansson, drummer Daniel Sjögren, and vocalist Christian Eriksson were brought onto the project. The four had all previously played together in several split-up local bands from Falun, namely Mandrake, SkyRide, and Zia. Although Sjögren was not immediately made a member of the band and was not featured on the band's debut album, he joined the group later as a replacement for then-drummer Robban Bäck, who was unable to perform live with the band.

The group made their debut performance in Madrid on 30 November 2013, before they had actually released any material publicly, while Johansson and Eriksson had done an acoustic set together the night before. Johansson played both sets with a broken index finger. With plenty of material for an album, the band started work on their debut album recording, Tales of Ancient Prophecies, which was released in 2014 by Black Lodge Records. The album hit 29th position in Swedish charts. Immediately after, the band began writing their second album.

In February 2016 the band announced they signed a deal with Nuclear Blast Records. Later that year, on 26 August, they released their label debut called Heroes of Mighty Magic with Joakim Brodén and Fabio Lione as guest vocalists. In early October 2017, it was announced that Christian Eriksson had left the band. He was temporarily replaced by Tommy Johansson during their tour as a special guest of DragonForce in October and November 2017. Eriksson claims that he suddenly received a text from the other band members saying that he was no longer part of the band, and that they had found a temporary replacement, Tommy Johansson, for their upcoming tour. Additionally, the band cited his contribution to the works of the band as "nonexistent". In June 2018, Alessandro Conti of Trick or Treat and formerly of Luca Turilli's Rhapsody was announced as the new vocalist.

On 23 May 2019, the band revealed the title and album art for their third album, Dawn of the Dragonstar, which was released 16 August 2019. The album was the first to feature Conti (as Allyon) on vocals.

On 5 November 2019, the band announced that drummer Daniel Sjögren had departed the band. Sjögren clarified that his decision to leave the band was amicable. Isak Olsson, also from Falun, was immediately brought in to fill the role of De'Azsh.

On 3 November 2022, the band announced the title of their fourth studio album, At the Heart of Wintervale, which was released on 20 January 2023. The band joined Gloryhammer as an opening act for their North American tour in March 2024. Lynd, Born and Aerendir announced their departures from the band in June 2024. Galen Stapley, Bradley Hall and Alex Miles were later announced as their replacements in September 2024, with live backing vocalist Kristin Starkey also being announced as the band's official backing vocalist. The new lineup performed their first show at ProgPower USA that same month. On 10 February 2026, the band were announced as a support act for Alestorm's Canada tour in May 2026. On 17 February 2026, the band announced that they had signed with the record label Napalm Records, and simultaneously released the single, "Magic of a New Dawn".

== Band members ==
=== Current ===
- Daniel Beckman (Blackwald) – keyboards, backing vocals, piano, violin, cembalo (2011–present)
- Alessandro Conti (Allyon) – lead vocals (2018–present)
- Isak Olsson (De'Azsh) – drums, percussion (2019–present)
- Kristin Starkey (Krysthara) – backing vocals (2024–present; live member 2022–2024)
- Galen Stapley (Galyn) – guitars (2024–present)
- Bradley Hall (Bramley Underhall) – guitars (2024–present)
- Alex Miles (Xandor) – bass (2024–present)

=== Former ===
- Philip Lindh (Lynd) – lead guitar, backing vocals, acoustic guitar, lute (2011–2024)
- Robban Bäck (Roberto) – drums, percussion (2013)
- Christian Eriksson (Chrileon) – lead vocals (2013–2017)
- Daniel Sjögren (De'Azsh) – drums, percussion (2013–2019)
- Jocke Leandro Johansson (Aerendir) – rhythm guitar, backing vocals (2013–2024)
- Dunder Björn Lundqvist (Born) – bass, backing vocals (2013–2024)

=== Touring ===
- Tommy Johansson – lead vocals (2017)
- Peter de Reyna – bass (2026)

== Discography ==
=== Studio albums ===
- Tales of Ancient Prophecies (2014)
- Heroes of Mighty Magic (2016)
- Dawn of the Dragonstar (2019)
- At the Heart of Wintervale (2023)
