= Black Lodge Records =

Swedish record label

- Parent company: Sound Pollution Distribution
- Founded: 2002
- Distributor: Sound Pollution Distribution
- Genre: Progressive metal; power metal; thrash metal; black metal; death metal; heavy metal
- Country of origin: Sweden
- Location: Stockholm, Sweden
- Official website: soundpollutiondistribution.se

Black Lodge Records is a Swedish record label headquartered in Stockholm. It was formed in 2002, and exclusively focuses on the metal genre. The label spans a wide selection of Swedish and European metal artists, but is best known for launching the careers of bands like Sabaton, In Flames, and Twilight Force.

== Distribution ==
Black Lodge Records has been owned by Sound Pollution Distribution, a Swedish record distribution company, since its formation in 2002.

== Roster ==
=== Current ===
- Abramis Brama
- Ages
- Beyond the Katakomb
- Bonafide
- Death Breath
- Defecto
- Eternal of Sweden
- Hellfueled
- Hellman
- Insania
- Maze of Torment
- Mean Streak
- Merciless
- Nale
- Quantum
- Raise Hell
- Rutthna
- Sterbhaus
- Stillborn
- STRӦM
- The Storyteller
- Transport League

=== Past ===
- 8th Sin
- Abruptum
- Amorphis
- Bullet
- Candlemass
- Construcdead
- Dissection
- Eleine
- Elvira Madigan
- Enforcer
- Eternal Oath
- Face Down
- Faceshift
- Harms Way
- Hysterica
- In Flames
- Katatonia
- Månegarm
- Marduk
- Mörk Gryning
- Netherbird
- Sabaton
- Serpent Obscene
- The Kristet Utseende
- Twilight Force
- Tyranex

== See also ==
- List of record labels
