= Europe discography =

Cataloging of published recordings by Europe

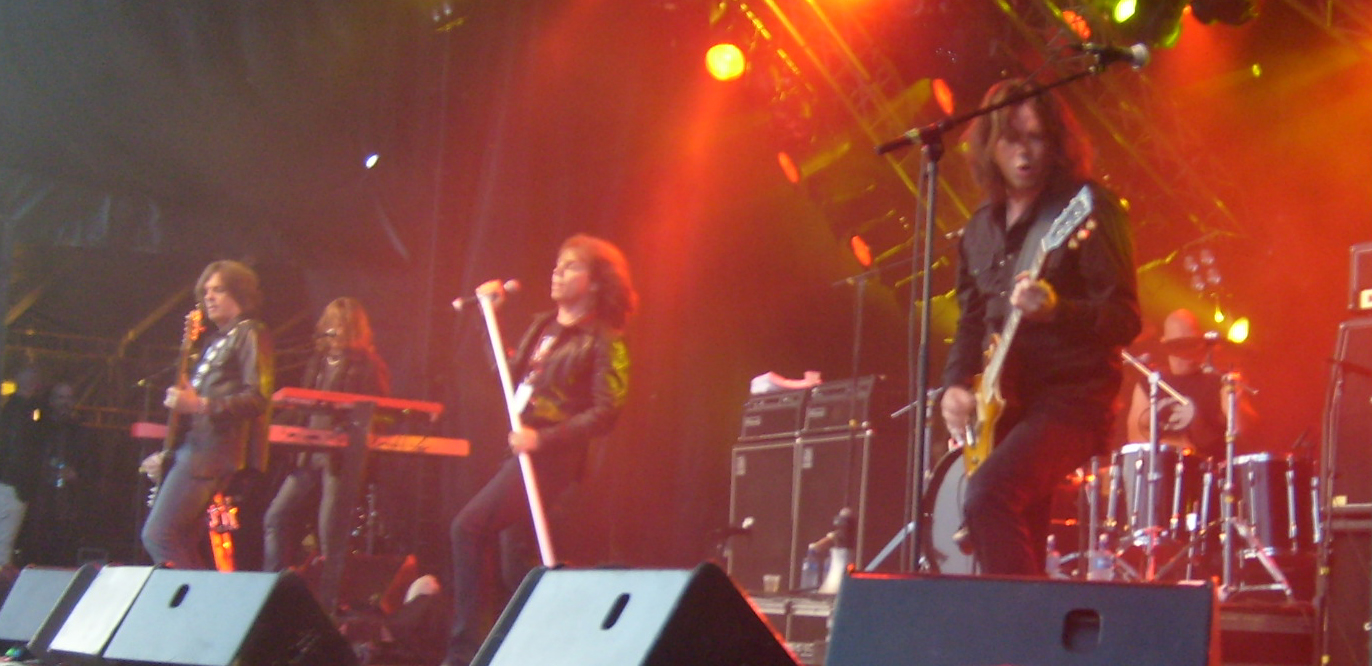
- Europe live at Midnattsrocken in Lakselv, Norway, 2008. From left to right: John Levén, Mic Michaeli, Joey Tempest, John Norum and Ian Haugland
- Studio albums: 12
- Extended plays: 1
- Live albums: 8
- Compilation albums: 5
- Singles: 35
- Video albums: 11
- Music videos: 28

The discography of Europe, a Swedish hard rock band, consists of 12 studio albums, 37 singles, eight live albums, one extended play (EP), 29 music videos and 11 video albums. This list does not include solo material or side projects performed by the band members.

The band was formed under the name Force by vocalist Joey Tempest and guitarist John Norum in Upplands Väsby in 1979. After changing its name to Europe and winning a national talent contest in 1982, the band signed with the independent label Hot Records and released its debut album Europe in 1983 and Wings of Tomorrow in 1984. Europe subsequently signed with Epic Records in 1985 and released its third album, The Final Countdown in 1986. The band released two more albums, Out of This World in 1988 and Prisoners in Paradise in 1991, before going on hiatus in 1992.

After a one-off performance in Stockholm on New Year's Eve 1999, Europe reunited in 2003 and released Start from the Dark, which peaked at number 2 on the Swedish album chart in 2004. The next album, Secret Society, was released in 2006. The eighth studio album, Last Look at Eden, was released in 2009, and was the first Europe album to enter at number 1 in the Swedish album chart since Out of This World in 1988.

== Studio albums ==
Year	Album details	Peak chart positions													Certifications (sales thresholds)
Year	Album details	SWE	AUS	AUT	CAN	FRA	GER	ITA	NLD	NOR	SWI	UK	US	EU	Certifications (sales thresholds)
1983	Europe: Released: 14 March 1983; Label: Hot Records; Formats: CD, LP	8	—	—	—	—	—	—	—	—	—	—	—	—	
1984	Wings of Tomorrow: Released: 24 February 1984; Label: Hot Records; Formats: CD, LP	20	—	—	—	—	—	—	—	—	—	—	—	—	
1986	The Final Countdown: Released: 26 May 1986; Label: Epic Records; Formats: CD, LP	1	3	5	6	10	6	2	3	4	1	9	8	—	BPI: Gold; BVMI: Gold; MC: 2× Platinum; NVPI: Gold; RIAA: 3× Platinum; SNEP: Platinum
1988	Out of This World: Released: 9 August 1988; Label: Epic; Formats: CD, LP	1	28	16	30	19	10	8	7	1	3	12	19	—	GLF: Platinum; MC: Gold; RIAA: Platinum; SNEP: Gold
1991	Prisoners in Paradise: Released: 23 September 1991; Label: Epic; Formats: CD, LP	9	197	32	—	—	38	22	60	18	17	61	—	—	GLF: Platinum
2004	Start from the Dark: Released: 22 September 2004; Label: Sanctuary Records, JVC; Formats: CD	2	—	—	—	114	—	65	86	—	91	—	—	—	
2006	Secret Society: Released: 25 October 2006; Label: Sanctuary Records, JVC; Formats: CD, digital download	4	—	—	—	195	—	41	—	—	93	—	—	70	
2009	Last Look at Eden: Released: 9 September 2009; Label: Universal, earMUSIC, JVC; Formats: CD, LP, digital download, streaming	1	—	—	—	86	31	37	—	—	29	125	—	—	GLF: Gold
2012	Bag of Bones: Released: 18 April 2012; Label: Gain, earMUSIC, JVC; Formats: CD, LP, digital download, streaming	2	—	30	—	70	26	52	44	21	18	56	—	—	GLF: Gold
2015	War of Kings: Released: 2 March 2015; Label: UDR Records, JVC; Formats: CD, LP, digital download, streaming	2	—	27	—	69	23	41	35	38	6	50	—	—	
2017	Walk the Earth: Released: 20 October 2017; Label: Hell & Back, JVC; Formats: CD, LP, digital download, streaming	2	—	28	—	62	40	43	—	38	20	69	—	—	
2026	Come This Madness: Released: 25 September 2026; Label: Hell & Back, King; Formats: CD, LP, digital download, streaming	2	—	5	—	—	9	29	52	54	2	30	—	—	
" — " denotes releases that did not chart. If this is used "-" it means not released in that country or the chart service in that country hadn't been established, or chart information is not available.

== Live albums ==
Year	Album details	Peak chart positions		
Year	Album details	SWE	GER	UK
1986	The Final Countdown Tour 1986: Released: 16 December 2004; Label: JVC Victor; Formats: CD	—	—	—
1986 - 1992	Extended Versions: Released: 27 March 2007; Label: BMG Special Products; Formats: CD	—	—	—
2008	Almost Unplugged: Released: 17 September 2008; Label: Hell&Back, JVC; Formats: CD, LP	23	—	—
2011	Live! At Shepherd's Bush, London: Released: 15 June 2011; Label: Hell&Back, JVC; Formats: CD, CD/DVD, Digital Download	—	61	—
2011	Live Look at Eden: Released: 8 August 2011; Label: Hell&Back; Formats: CD+DVD	—	—	—
2013	Live at Sweden Rock – 30th Anniversary Show: Released: 16 October 2013; Label: Gain/Sony Music, JVC; Formats: CD, CD/DVD, Digital Download	18	66	173
2017	The Final Countdown 30th Anniversary Show – Live at the Roundhouse: Released: 21 July 2017; Label: Hell & Back, JVC; Formats: CD, CD/DVD, LP, Digital Download	—	—	40
" — " denotes releases that did not chart.

== Compilation albums ==
Year	Album details	Peak chart positions								Certifications (sales thresholds)
Year	Album details	SWE	DEN	ESP	FIN	GER	NLD	NOR	UK	Certifications (sales thresholds)
1993	1982–1992: Released: 5 April 1993; Label: Epic Records; Formats: CD, CS, LP	47	—	—	—	82	18	—	—	SWE: Gold SNEP France: Gold IFPI CH: Gold
1998	Super Hits: Released: 1998; Label: Epic Music; Formats: CD, CS, LP	—	—	—	—	—	—	—	—	
1999	1982–2000: Released: December 1999; Label: Sony Music; Formats: CD, CS, LP	—	—	75	—	—	—	—	—	
2004	Rock the Night: The Very Best of Europe: Released: 3 March 2004; Label: Sony Music; Formats: CD, LP	2	11	—	5	—	—	3	—	SWE: Gold
2009	The Final Countdown: The Best of Europe: Released: 1 June 2009; Label: Sony Music / Camden Deluxe; Formats: CD	—	—	—	—	—	—	—	—	
2021	Gold: Released: 8 January 2021; Label: Crimson / Sony Music; Formats: CD	—	—	—	—	—	—	—	58	
" — " denotes releases that did not chart.

== Extended plays ==
Year	Title
1985	On the Loose: Released: April 1985; Label: Epic Records; Formats: LP

== Singles ==
Year	Title	Peak chart positions										Album
Year	Title	SWE	AUS	AUT	CAN	FRA	GER	ITA	SWI	UK	US	Album
1983	"Seven Doors Hotel"	—	—	—	—	—	—	—	—	—	—	Europe
1984	"Lyin' Eyes"	—	—	—	—	—	—	—	—	—	—	Wings of Tomorrow
1984	"Stormwind"	—	—	—	—	—	—	—	—	—	—	Wings of Tomorrow
1984	"Dreamer"	—	—	—	—	—	—	—	—	—	—	Wings of Tomorrow
1984	"Open Your Heart"	—	—	—	—	—	—	—	—	—	—	Wings of Tomorrow
1985	"Rock the Night"	4	—	—	—	—	—	—	—	—	—	On the Loose EP
1986	"The Final Countdown"	1	2	1	5	1	1	1	1	1	8	The Final Countdown
1986	"Love Chaser" ^{(Japan only)}	—	—	—	—	—	—	—	—	—	—	The Final Countdown
1986	"Rock the Night"	—	22	11	64	7	17	3	6	12	30	The Final Countdown
1987	"Carrie"	—	—	15	9	11	22	10	10	22	3	The Final Countdown
1987	"Cherokee"	—	—	—	—	—	—	—	—	—	72	The Final Countdown
1988	"Superstitious"	1	45	—	35	33	21	—	9	34	31	Out of This World
1988	"Open Your Heart"	—	—	—	—	67	—	—	—	86	—	Out of This World
1989	"Let the Good Times Rock"	—	—	—	—	—	—	—	—	85	—	Out of This World
1989	"More Than Meets the Eye"	—	—	—	—	—	—	—	—	—	—	Out of This World
1991	"Prisoners in Paradise"	8	129	—	—	—	—	—	—	—	—	Prisoners in Paradise
1991	"I'll Cry for You"	—	179	—	—	—	—	—	—	28	—	Prisoners in Paradise
1992	"Halfway to Heaven"	—	—	—	—	—	—	—	—	42	—	Prisoners in Paradise
1993	"Sweet Love Child"	—	—	—	—	—	—	—	—	—	—	1982-1992
1999	"The Final Countdown 2000"	6	33	—	—	—	35	—	33	36	—	1982-2000
2004	"Got to Have Faith"	21	—	—	—	—	—	—	—	—	—	Start from the Dark
2004	"Hero"	—	—	—	—	—	—	—	—	—	—	Start from the Dark
2006	"Always the Pretenders"	2	—	—	—	—	—	—	—	—	—	Secret Society
2009	"Last Look at Eden"	50	—	—	—	—	—	—	—	—	—	Last Look at Eden
2009	"New Love in Town"	15	—	—	—	—	—	—	—	—	—	Last Look at Eden
2012	"Not Supposed to Sing the Blues"	—	—	—	—	—	—	—	—	—	—	Bag of Bones
2012	"Firebox"	—	—	—	—	—	—	—	—	—	—	Bag of Bones
2013	"Bring It All Home"	—	—	—	—	—	—	—	—	—	—	Bag of Bones
2015	"War of Kings"	—	—	—	—	—	—	—	—	—	—	War of Kings
2015	"Days of Rock 'n' Roll"	—	—	—	—	—	—	—	—	—	—	War of Kings
2016	"The Final Countdown (30th Anniversary Edition)"	—	—	—	—	—	—	—	—	—	—	
2017	"Walk the Earth"	—	—	—	—	—	—	—	—	—	—	Walk the Earth
2023	"Hold Your Head Up"	—	—	—	—	—	—	—	—	—	—	
2026	"One on One"	—	—	—	—	—	—	—	—	—	—	Come This Madness
2026	"The Cult of Ignorance"	—	—	—	—	—	—	—	—	—	—	Come This Madness
2026	"Scandinavian Eyes"	—	—	—	—	—	—	—	—	—	—	Come This Madness
"—" denotes releases that did not chart, or were not released in those countries.

== Video albums ==
Year	Title
1986	The Final Countdown Tour 1986: Released: 1986 22 September 2004; Label: Victor Entertainment; Formats: VHS, DVD
1987	The Final Countdown: Released: 1987; Label: CBS/Fox Video; Formats: VHS
1987	The Final Countdown World Tour: Released: 1987; Label: CMV Enterprises; Formats: VHS, Laserdisc
1987	Europe in America: Released: 1987; Label: PolyGram; Formats: VHS, Laserdisc
2004	Rock the Night: Collectors Edition: Released: 3 March 2004; Label: Sony Music; Formats: DVD
2005	Live from the Dark: Released: 18 November 2005; Label: Warner Bros. Entertainment; Formats: DVD
2006	The Final Countdown Tour 1986: Live in Sweden - 20th Anniversary Edition: Released: 4 October 2006; Label: Warner Bros. Entertainment; Formats: DVD
2009	Almost Unplugged: Released: 19 August 2009; Label: Warner Home Video; Formats: DVD
2011	Live! At Shepherd's Bush, London: Released: 15 June 2011; Label: Nordisk Film; Formats: DVD, Blu-ray
2013	Live at Sweden Rock – 30th Anniversary Show: Released: 16 October 2013; Label: Gain, Edel, JVC; Formats: DVD, Blu-ray
2017	The Final Countdown 30th Anniversary Show – Live at the Roundhouse: Released: 21 July 2017; Label: Hell & Back, JVC; Formats: DVD, Blu-ray

== Music videos ==
Year	Title	Director(s)
1983	"In the Future to Come"	
1986	"The Final Countdown"	Nick Morris
1986	"Rock the Night"	Nick Morris
1987	"Carrie"	Nick Morris
1987	"Cherokee"	Nick Morris
1988	"Superstitious"	Nick Morris
1988	"Open Your Heart"	Jean Pellerin; Doug Freel
1988	"Let the Good Times Rock"	Nick Morris
1991	"Prisoners in Paradise"	Nick Morris
1991	"I'll Cry for You"	Phil Tuckett
1992	"Halfway to Heaven"	
1999	"The Final Countdown 2000"	
2004	"Got to Have Faith"	Micadelica
2004	"Hero"	Ligistfilm
2006	"Always the Pretenders"	Micadelica
2009	"Last Look at Eden"	Patric Ullaeus
2009	"New Love in Town"	Patric Ullaeus
2012	"Not Supposed to Sing the Blues"	Patric Ullaeus
2012	"Firebox"	Patric Ullaeus
2015	"War of Kings"	Patric Ullaeus
2015	"Days of Rock 'n' Roll"	Patric Ullaeus
2017	"Walk the Earth"	Patric Ullaeus
2018	"The Siege"	Patric Ullaeus
2019	"Turn to Dust"	Craig Hooper
2023	"Hold Your Head Up"	Adam Parsons
2026	"One on One"	Patric Ullaeus
2026	"The Cult of Ignorance"	Patric Ullaeus
2026	"Scandinavian Eyes"	Patric Ullaeus
2026	"Come This Madness"	
