= Live at Sweden Rock – 30th Anniversary Show =

Video by Europe
- Released: 16 October 2013
- Recorded: 7 June 2013
- Studios: Sweden Rock Festival, Sölvesborg
- Genre: Hard rock
- Labels: Gain, Edel, JVC
- Director: Patric Ullaeus
- Producers: Patric Ullaeus, Europe

Europe video chronology
Live at Shepherd's Bush, London (2011)	Live at Sweden Rock – 30th Anniversary Show (2013)	The Final Countdown 30th Anniversary Show – Live at the Roundhouse (2017)

Europe albums chronology
Bag of Bones (2012)	Live at Sweden Rock – 30th Anniversary Show (2013)	War of Kings (2015)

Professional ratings
Review scores
Source	Rating
Classic Rock	7/10 stars

Live at Sweden Rock – 30th Anniversary Show is a live album by the Swedish hard rock band Europe. It was recorded on 7 June 2013 at Sweden Rock Festival and released on CD, DVD and Blu-ray on 16 October 2013. It is the longest live concert done by the band, featuring over two hours and containing 28 songs from all albums.

== Track listing ==
No.	Title	Writer(s)	From album/single	Length
1.	"Intro / Riches to Rags"	Mic Michaeli (Intro), Joey Tempest, John Levén (Riches to Rags)	Bag of Bones	4:02
2.	"Firebox"	Tempest, Michaeli	Bag of Bones	4:00
3.	"Not Supposed to Sing the Blues"	Tempest	Bag of Bones	5:27
4.	"Scream of Anger"	Tempest, Marcel Jacob	Wings of Tomorrow	4:35
5.	"Superstitious"	Tempest	Out of This World	5:58
6.	"No Stone Unturned"	Tempest, Europe	Last Look at Eden	5:46
7.	"New Love in Town"	Tempest, Michaeli, Andreas Carlsson, Europe	Last Look at Eden	3:43
8.	"In the Future to Come"	Tempest	Europe	5:44
9.	"Paradize Bay"	Tempest	Europe	4:21
10.	"Girl from Lebanon"	Tempest	Prisoners in Paradise	5:50
11.	"Prisoners in Paradise"	Tempest	Prisoners in Paradise	4:43
12.	"Always the Pretenders"	Tempest, Levén	Secret Society	4:38
13.	"Drink and a Smile" (acoustic version)	Tempest, Michaeli	Bag of Bones	2:49
14.	"Open Your Heart" (acoustic version)	Tempest	Wings of Tomorrow	3:53
15.	"Love Is Not the Enemy"	Tempest, John Norum	Secret Society	4:33
16.	"Sign of the Times"	Tempest	Out of This World	4:35
17.	"Start from the Dark"	Tempest, Norum	Start from the Dark	4:30
18.	"Wings of Tomorrow"	Tempest	Wings of Tomorrow	4:46
19.	"Carrie"	Tempest, Michaeli	The Final Countdown	5:06
20.	"Jailbreak" (Thin Lizzy cover featuring Scott Gorham)	Phil Lynott	Jailbreak	4:58
21.	"Seven Doors Hotel"	Tempest	Europe	5:22
22.	"Drum Solo" (arranged by Ian Haugland)	Eric Idle, Gioacchino Rossini		5:02
23.	"The Beast"	Tempest, Levėn, Europe	Last Look at Eden	3:22
24.	"Let the Good Times Rock"	Tempest	Out of This World	5:24
25.	"Lights Out" (UFO cover featuring Michael Schenker)	Michael Schenker, Paul Raymond, Andy Parker, Pete Way	Lights Out	5:09
26.	"Rock the Night"	Tempest	The Final Countdown	6:13
27.	"Last Look at Eden"	Tempest, Carlsson, Europe	Last Look at Eden	4:37
28.	"The Final Countdown"	Tempest	The Final Countdown	6:24

== Personnel ==
Europe

- John Norum – guitar, backing vocals
- Joey Tempest – lead vocals, acoustic and rhythm guitars
- John Levén – bass guitar
- Mic Michaeli – keyboards, backing vocals
- Ian Haugland – drums, backing vocals

Guest performers

- Scott Gorham – guitar on "Jailbreak"
- Michael Schenker – guitar on "Lights Out"

== Charts ==
=== Weekly charts ===
Weekly album chart performance
Chart (2013)	Peak position
German Albums (Offizielle Top 100)	66
Swedish Albums (Sverigetopplistan)	18
UK Independent Albums (Official Charts)	39
UK Rock & Metal Albums (Official Charts)	19

Weekly video chart performance
Chart (2013)	Peak position
Austrian Music DVD (Ö3 Austria)	3
Danish Music DVD (Hitlisten)	3
Dutch Music DVD (MegaCharts)	10
Finnish Music DVD (Suomen virallinen lista)	2
Swedish Music DVD (Sverigetopplistan)	1
Swiss Music DVD (Schweizer Hitparade)	5

=== Year-end charts ===
Year-end video chart performance
Chart (2013)	Position
Swedish Music DVD (Sverigetopplistan)	2
Chart (2014)	Position
Swedish Music DVD (Sverigetopplistan)	10
Chart (2015)	Position
Swedish Music DVD (Sverigetopplistan)	8
Chart (2016)	Position
Swedish Music DVD (Sverigetopplistan)	72

== Certifications ==
Certifications
Region	Certification	Certified units/sales
Sweden (GLF) DVD	Gold	10,000^{^}
^{^} Shipments figures based on certification alone.
