= The Final Countdown: The Best of Europe =

Greatest hits album by Europe
- Released: 1 July 2009
- Recorded: 1983–1999
- Genre: Hard rock
- Length: 74:00/75:00
- Label: Sony Music, Camden Deluxe

Europe chronology
Almost Unplugged (2008)	The Final Countdown: The Best of Europe (2009)	Last Look at Eden (2009)

The Final Countdown: The Best of Europe is a compilation album by Swedish rock band Europe, released in 2009 by Sony Music and Camden Deluxe. It contains some songs from the band's debut album and albums through 1999. It contains 36 songs with 18 on each CD.

== Track listing ==
All songs were written by Joey Tempest, except where noted.

Disc 2
No.	Title	Writer(s)	Length
1.	"The Final Countdown"		5:12
2.	"Carrie"	Tempest, Mic Michaeli	4:32
3.	"Rock the Night"		4:06
4.	"Superstitious"		4:35
5.	"Love Chaser"		3:28
6.	"Cherokee"		4:42
7.	"Open Your Heart"		4:03
8.	"Let the Good Times Rock"		4:05
9.	"Sign of the Times"		4:16
10.	"More Than Meets the Eye"	Tempest, Kee Marcello, Michaeli	3:22
11.	"Tomorrow"		3:06
12.	"Prisoners in Paradise" (single version)		4:31
13.	"I'll Cry for You"	Tempest, Nick Graham	4:11
14.	"Halfway to Heaven"	Tempest, Jim Vallance	4:08
15.	"Sweet Love Child"	Tempest, Marcello, Michaeli	4:59
16.	"The Final Countdown 2000"		3:49
17.	"Time Has Come"		4:00
18.	"Heart of Stone"		3:48
Total length:			74:00

Disc 3
No.	Title	Writer(s)	Length
1.	"On Broken Wings"	Tempest	3:43
2.	"In the Future to Come"		5:02
3.	"Seven Doors Hotel"		5:17
4.	"Stormwind"		4:25
5.	"Scream of Anger"	Tempest, Marcel Jacob	4:06
6.	"Dreamer"		4:21
7.	"Ninja"		3:47
8.	"Coast to Coast"	Tempest, Marcello, Michaeli	4:01
9.	"Ready or Not"		4:05
10.	"Seventh Sign"	Tempest, Marcello, Michaeli	4:43
11.	"Got Your Mind in the Gutter"	Tempest, Beau Hill, Marcello	5:00
12.	"Aphasia" (Instrumental)	John Norum	2:31
13.	"A Long Time Comin'"		3:56
14.	"Girl from Lebanon"		4:22
15.	"Wings of Tomorrow"		3:59
16.	"Danger on the Track"		3:47
17.	"Never Say Die"		4:02
18.	"Lights and Shadows"		4:05
Total length:			75:00

== Personnel ==
- Joey Tempest – vocals, keyboards (all tracks)
- John Norum – guitar, backing vocals
- Kee Marcello – guitar, backing vocals
- John Levén – bass (all tracks)
- Mic Michaeli – keyboards, backing vocals (all tracks except 2–3 on disc 2)
- Tony Reno – drums (tracks 2–6, 12, 15 on disc 2)
- Ian Haugland – drums, backing vocals (all tracks except 2–6, 12, 15 on disc 2)
