= The Final Countdown 30th Anniversary Show – Live at the Roundhouse =

2017 live album by Europe

Live album by Europe
- Released: 21 July 2017
- Recorded: 12 November 2016
- Venue: Roundhouse, London
- Genre: Hard rock
- Length: 1:43:37
- Label: Hell & Back, JVC
- Director: Patric Ullaeus
- Producer: Patric Ullaeus

Europe chronology
War of Kings (2015)	The Final Countdown 30th Anniversary Show – Live at the Roundhouse (2017)	Walk the Earth (2017)

Europe video chronology
Live at Sweden Rock – 30th Anniversary Show (2013)	The Final Countdown 30th Anniversary Show – Live at the Roundhouse (2017)

Professional ratings
Review scores
Source	Rating
Louder	3/5 stars
The Rockpit	3/5 stars
Norway Rock	5/6 stars

The Final Countdown 30th Anniversary Show – Live at the Roundhouse is a double live album by the Swedish hard rock band Europe. It was recorded on 12 November 2016 at the Roundhouse during The Final Countdown 30th Anniversary Tour and released on CD, DVD and Blu-ray on 21 July 2017. It contains all songs from War of Kings and The Final Countdown.

== Track listing ==
Disc one, from War of Kings
No.	Title	Writer(s)	Length
1.	"Hole in My Pocket"	Joey Tempest; John Levén	5:23
2.	"The Second Day"	Tempest; Mic Michaeli	4:52
3.	"Praise You"	Tempest; Michaeli; Dave Cobb	4:56
4.	"Nothin' to Ya"	Tempest; John Norum; Michaeli; Levén; Ian Haugland	4:03
5.	"California 405"	Tempest; Michaeli	4:56
6.	"Angels (With Broken Hearts)"	Tempest; Michaeli; Norum; Levén; Haugland; Cobb	5:24
7.	"Days of Rock 'n' Roll"	Tempest	3:28
8.	"Children of the Mind"	Tempest; Michaeli; Cobb	4:29
9.	"Rainbow Bridge"	Tempest; Michaeli	4:52
10.	"Vasastan" (Instrumental)	Michaeli; Norum	4:02
11.	"Light It Up"	Tempest; Norum; Levén	5:38
12.	"War of Kings"	Tempest; Levén; Cobb	4:45
Total length:			56:49

Disc two, from The Final Countdown
No.	Title	Writer(s)	Length
1.	"The Final Countdown"	Tempest	6:16
2.	"Rock the Night"	Tempest	5:13
3.	"Carrie"	Tempest; Michaeli	5:06
4.	"Danger on the Track"	Tempest	3:42
5.	"Ninja"	Tempest	4:19
6.	"Cherokee"	Tempest	4:14
7.	"Time Has Come"	Tempest	4:27
8.	"Heart of Stone"	Tempest	3:50
9.	"On the Loose"	Tempest	3:12
10.	"Love Chaser"	Tempest	3:32
11.	"The Final Countdown" (Reprise)	Tempest	2:57
Total length:			46:48; 103:37

== Personnel ==
=== Europe ===
- John Norum – guitar, backing vocals
- Joey Tempest – lead vocals
- John Levén – bass guitar
- Mic Michaeli – keyboards, backing vocals
- Ian Haugland – drums, backing vocals

=== Technical personnel ===
- Patric Ullaeus – directing, filming, editing
- Jay Ruston – mixing
- Eric Boulanger – mastering
- Ronny Bernstrom and Peer Stappe – recording and post production
