= Live from the Dark =

- Starring: Europe
- Music by: Europe
- Distributed by: Warner Bros. Entertainment
- Release date: November 18, 2005
- Running time: 240 min
- Language: English

Live from the Dark is a DVD released by the Swedish hard rock band Europe. The main feature is a concert filmed at the Hammersmith Apollo in London, England on November 15, 2004.

A bonus disc with extra material is included, and there is a Special Edition version of this DVD which also contains the CD Start from the Dark.

== Track listing - Disc 1 ==
1. "Got to Have Faith"
2. "Ready or Not"
3. "Superstitious"
4. "America"
5. "Wings of Tomorrow"
6. "Let the Good Times Rock"
7. "Animal Crossing" [keyboard solo] / "Seven Doors Hotel"
8. "Hero"
9. "Wake Up Call"
10. "Sign of the Times"
11. "Milano" [guitar solo] / "Girl from Lebanon"
12. "Carrie" [acoustic version]
13. "Flames"
14. "Yesterday's News" [printed as "Yesterdaze News"]
15. "Rock the Night"
16. "Start from the Dark"
17. "Cherokee"
18. "The Final Countdown"

== Bonus Features - Disc 2 ==
- Behind the Tour: Documentary about the tour.
- Taxi Diaries: Interviews with all the band members.
- On-stage Interviews: Interviews with the musicians about their instruments and equipment.
- From the Soundcheck: "Spirit of the Underdog" and "Heart of Stone".
- Music Videos: "Got to Have Faith" and "Hero".
- Miscellaneous: Biography, discography and videography.

== Personnel ==
- Joey Tempest – lead vocals, rhythm & acoustic guitars
- John Norum – lead & rhythm guitars, backing vocals
- John Levén – bass guitar
- Mic Michaeli – keyboards, backing vocals
- Ian Haugland – drums, backing vocals
