= Live at Shepherd's Bush, London =

2011 DVD by Europe

- Starring: Europe
- Music by: Europe
- Distributed by: Nordisk Film
- Release date: 15 June 2011
- Running time: 150 min (DVD); 180 min (Blu-ray)
- Language: English

Live at Shepherd's Bush, London is a DVD by the Swedish hard rock band Europe. The main feature is a concert filmed at the O2 Shepherd's Bush Empire in London on 19 February 2011. It was released on DVD and Blu-ray on 15 June 2011.

Both the DVD and Blu-ray editions includes an extra CD that includes the same concert, except for three songs due to time constraints.

== Track listing ==
1. "Last Look at Eden"
2. "The Beast"
3. "Rock the Night"
4. "Scream of Anger"
5. "No Stone Unturned"
6. "Carrie"
7. "The Getaway Plan"
8. Guitar Feature: "The Loner" (tribute to Gary Moore)
9. "Seventh Sign"
10. "New Love in Town"
11. "Love is Not the Enemy"
12. "More Than Meets the Eye"
13. Drum Feature: William Tell Overture
14. "Always the Pretenders"
15. "Start from the Dark"
16. "Superstitious"
17. "Doghouse"
18. "The Final Countdown"

== Bonus features ==
=== DVD & Blu-Ray ===
- Live photo gallery
- Live footage from Stockholm ice stadium "Hovet" 28 December 2009:
  1. "Prelude/Last Look at Eden"
  2. "Love is Not the Enemy"
  3. "Superstitious"
  4. "Gonna Get Ready"
  5. "Scream of Anger"
  6. "No Stone Unturned"
  7. "Carrie" (on Blu-ray only)
  8. "Start From The Dark" (on Blu-ray only)
  9. "New Love in Town"
  10. "Let The Good Times Rock" (on Blu-ray only)
  11. "Cherokee" (on Blu-ray only)
  12. "The Beast"
  13. "Seven Doors Hotel" (on Blu-ray only)
- Live footage from Gröna Lund in Stockholm 17 September 2010:
  1. "Last Look at Eden"
  2. Guitar Feature
  3. "Seventh Sign"
  4. "Start from the Dark"
- Live photo gallery
- Documentary: interviews and rehearsals (on Blu-ray only)
- Music videos:
  - "Last Look at Eden"
  - "New Love in Town"

=== Extra live CD ===
1. "Prelude"
2. "Last Look at Eden"
3. "The Beast"
4. "Rock the Night"
5. "Scream of Anger"
6. "No Stone Unturned"
7. "Carrie"
8. "The Getaway Plan"
9. "Seventh Sign"
10. "New Love in Town"
11. "Love is Not the Enemy"
12. "More Than Meets the Eye"
13. "Always the Pretenders"
14. "Start from the Dark"
15. "Superstitious"
16. "The Final Countdown"

== Personnel ==
- Joey Tempest – lead vocals, rhythm & acoustic guitars
- John Norum – lead & rhythm guitars, backing vocals
- John Levén – bass guitar
- Mic Michaeli – keyboards, backing vocals
- Ian Haugland – drums, backing vocals
