= The Final Countdown Tour 1986 =

- Starring: Europe
- Music by: Europe
- Distributed by: Victor Entertainment
- Release dates: 1986 (VHS); 22 September 2004 (DVD)
- Running time: 40 min
- Languages: English, Swedish

The Final Countdown Tour 1986 is a concert video released by the Swedish hard rock band Europe. It features footage from a concert filmed at Solnahallen in Solna, Sweden on May 26, 1986. It was first released on VHS in Japan in 1986, and was released on DVD and CD in 2004.

A remastered edition, entitled The Final Countdown Tour 1986: Live in Sweden - 20th Anniversary Edition, was released on DVD on October 4, 2006 to mark the 20th anniversary of the album The Final Countdown.

== Track listing ==
All tracks are written by Joey Tempest, except "Carrie" by Tempest and Mic Michaeli.

No.	Title	Length
1.	"The Final Countdown"	5:40
2.	"Ninja"	4:17
3.	"Carrie"	4:33
4.	"On the Loose"	3:03
5.	"Cherokee"	4:12
6.	"Time Has Come"	4:13
7.	"Open Your Heart"	3:57
8.	"Stormwind"	5:41
9.	"Rock the Night"	4:48
Total length:		40:24

== Personnel ==
- Joey Tempest – lead vocals, acoustic guitars
- John Norum – lead & rhythm guitars, backing vocals
- John Levén – bass guitar, backing vocals
- Mic Michaeli – keyboards, backing vocals
- Ian Haugland – drums, backing vocals
