= The Final Countdown Tour 1986 (album) =

Live album by Europe
- Released: 20 December 2004
- Recorded: 25–26 May 1986
- Studio: Solna, Sweden
- Genre: Glam metal, hard rock, heavy metal
- Label: JVC Victor

Europe chronology
Start from the Dark (2004)	The Final Countdown Tour 1986 (2004)	Secret Society (2006)

Professional ratings
Review scores
Source	Rating
AllMusic	3/5 stars

The Final Countdown Tour 1986 is a live album by the Swedish hard rock band Europe. It was released on 20 December 2004.

== Track listing ==
All tracks are written by Joey Tempest, except "Carrie" by Tempest and Mic Michaeli.

No.	Title	Length
1.	"The Final Countdown"	5:40
2.	"Ninja"	4:17
3.	"Carrie"	4:33
4.	"On the Loose"	3:03
5.	"Cherokee"	4:12
6.	"Time Has Come"	4:13
7.	"Open Your Heart"	3:57
8.	"Stormwind"	5:41
9.	"Rock the Night"	4:48
Total length:		40:24

== Personnel ==
- Joey Tempest – lead vocals, acoustic guitar
- John Norum – lead & rhythm guitars, backing vocals
- John Levén – bass guitar
- Mic Michaeli – keyboards, backing vocals
- Ian Haugland – drums, backing vocals
