= On the Loose (1985 film) =

- Directed by: Staffan Hildebrand
- Written by: Staffan Hildebrand
- Produced by: Hillar Loor
- Starring: Tomas Fryk; Carina Lindström; Jerry Williams; Joey Tempest John Norum Mic Michaeli John Leven Ian Haugland
- Music by: Europe
- Distributed by: Föreningsfilmo AB
- Release date: 6 December 1985
- Running time: 32 minutes
- Country: Sweden
- Language: Swedish

On the Loose is a 1985 Swedish film directed by Staffan Hildebrand and distributed by Föreningsfilmo AB. It stars Tomas Fryk (known from the movies Love Me and Children's Island) and Carina Lindström and features appearances by rock 'n' roll singer Jerry Williams and the hard rock band Europe who also contributed three unique recordings to the movie's soundtrack.

== Plot ==
Peter works as a welder in his hometown Katrineholm, but dreams of getting a better job with more money. When Europe comes to Katrineholm to do a concert, Peter finds out that his girlfriend Nina had a relationship with the band's vocalist Joey Tempest many years ago. Peter thinks Nina wants to get back together with Joey, so he gets very jealous, gets drunk at the concert and goes berserk. The safety officer Frasse makes Peter realize he should pull himself together and go sort things out with Nina.

== Cast ==
- Tomas Fryk as Peter
- Carina Lindström as Nina
- Jerry Williams as Frasse
- Europe as themselves:
  - Joey Tempest
  - John Norum
  - John Levén
  - Mic Michaeli
  - Ian Haugland
- Thomas Erdtman as Europe's manager
- Joakim Ramstedt as security guard
- Frank Nietsch as security guard
- Johnny Aland as Peter's co-worker
- Henrik Nilsson as Peter's co-worker
- Jan-Erik Piotrowski as Peter's co-worker
- Stig Winblad as Peter's co-worker
- Stefan Perzanowski as Peter's co-worker

== Soundtrack ==
The soundtrack was written by Joey Tempest and featured the songs "Rock the Night", "On the Loose" (early versions of songs re-recorded for the album The Final Countdown) and the unique Joey Tempest solo recording "Broken Dreams". It was released as an EP only sold at screenings of the movie that is now a sought after collector's item especially outside Sweden. A live performance of "Rock the Night" by Europe is shown in the film. The John Lennon song "Working Class Hero" is also featured in the film, as sung by Jerry Williams.
