= Love Chaser =

Single by Europe

from the album The Final Countdown
- A-side: "Carrie"
- Released: 21 August 1986
- Length: 3:27
- Label: Victor
- Songwriter: Joey Tempest
- Producer: Kevin Elson

Europe singles chronology
| "The Final Countdown" (1986) | "Love Chaser" (1986) | "Rock the Night" (1986) |

Audio
- "Love Chaser" on YouTube

"Love Chaser" is a single by the Swedish rock band Europe, released in 1986. It was taken from the album The Final Countdown, and was released only in Japan in the soundtrack album of the Japanese movie Pride One. The track on the B-side of the single was "Carrie". Next year the single was reissued in Japan and was entitled "Carrie" with "Carrie" on the A-side. The reissue had the same catalogue number (VIPX-1849) as the first release.

The song was written by vocalist Joey Tempest in 1985, and was first played on a tour in Sweden the same year, before it was recorded and included on the Final Countdown album in 1986.

Japanese pro wrestler Yoshiaki Yatsu used the song as his entrance theme in All Japan Pro Wrestling.

== Personnel ==
- Joey Tempest − vocals
- John Norum − guitars
- Mic Michaeli − synthesizers
- John Levén − bass
- Ian Haugland − drums
