= Last Look at Eden (song) =

Single by Europe

from the album Last Look at Eden
- B-side: "U Devil U"
- Released: 8 June 2009 (Scandinavia); 26 June 2009 (Europe)
- Length: 4:11
- Label: Universal (Scandinavia); Edel (Europe)
- Songwriter(s): Joey Tempest, Andreas Carlsson, Europe
- Producer(s): Tobias Lindell, Joey Tempest, Mic Michaeli

Europe singles chronology
"Always the Pretenders" (2006)	"Last Look at Eden" (2009)	"New Love in Town" (2009)

"Last Look at Eden" is the first single to be released from the Swedish heavy metal band Europe's eighth studio album, Last Look at Eden. It was released on 8 June 2009.

In May 2009 Europe went to Gothenburg to work with director Patric Ullaeus on the music video for "Last Look at Eden". The video was premiered on Europe's MySpace page on June 3.

== Track listing ==
=== Single ===
1. "Last Look at Eden" (Joey Tempest, Andreas Carlsson, Europe) – 4:11
2. "U Devil U" (Joey Tempest, Europe) – 4:09
3. "Last Look at Eden" [radio edit] (Joey Tempest, Andreas Carlsson, Europe) – 3:59

=== Limited edition digipack ===
1. "Last Look at Eden" (Joey Tempest, Andreas Carlsson, Europe) – 4:11
2. "U Devil U" (Joey Tempest, Europe) – 4:09
3. "Superstitious" [live] (Joey Tempest) – 4:56
4. "Start from the Dark" [live] (Joey Tempest, John Norum) – 4:26
5. "Since I've Been Loving You" [live] (Jimmy Page, Robert Plant, John Paul Jones) – 7:24
6. "Last Look at Eden" [video]

== Personnel ==
- Joey Tempest – vocals, producer
- John Norum – guitars
- John Levén – bass
- Mic Michaeli – keyboards, producer
- Ian Haugland – drums
- Tobias Lindell – producer
- Fredrik Etoall – cover photo
- Dimitrios Dimitriadis – art direction

== Chart positions ==
Year	List	Peak	Ref.
2009	Swedish Singles Chart	50	
