= Clockwise (band) =

Swedish music project

- Origin: Stockholm, Sweden
- Genres: Rock, heavy metal, hard rock, power metal, neoclassical metal
- Labels: Empire Records, Pony Canyon
- Members: Benny Söderberg - vocals, keys.
- Past members: John Levén Bass, Ian Haugland Drums from Europe; Fredrik Åkesson (Talisman, Arch Enemy, Southpaw, now with Opeth); Jan Granwick.

Clockwise is a Swedish music project, formed by Benny Söderberg in 1995

The singer and songwriter Benny Söderberg Fortune (music group from Sweden) asked the musicians John Levén Bass, Ian Haugland Drums from Europe and guitarplayer Jan Granvik (Glory) to play on his coming album. Benny did meet John and Ian when they were playing with Glenn Hughes and Benny's previous band Fortune opened for Glenn Hughes on his Japan tour in 1994, and guitar player Jan Granwick (Glory) have Benny known for years so he was also asked to participate.

Benny felt that he wanted to make an album with all the elements that he thought a good album should have, nice melody and good musician ship. Not just jump onto the next music scene that appears 'cause it has changed. Together with Christer Wedin at Empire Records they set plans for this project. The debut album Nostalgia was created by Ronny Lahti (Europe, Talisman, Saigon Kick). 1999.

After the successful release of Clockwise debut album "Nostalgia", which received rave reviews all over the world, the second album called "Naïve", was released. And again, Benny Söderberg asked his musician friends, who participated on the first album, to record this follow up album. Therefore, you will again find, John Levén bass and Ian Haugland drums from Europe, as the solid rhythm section. Contractual reason made it impossible for guitar player Jan Granwick to participate on this second record. Therefore, the guitar axe man Fredrik Åkesson (Talisman, Arch Enemy, Southpaw now with Opeth) was asked to play with Clockwise on this record and so he did.

Benny has also recorded a demo for Clockwise 3rd album, (maybe) to be named "nothing is the greatest thing". On this demo Benny plays all instruments, except bass, which is played by John Levén, and for this demo Jan Granwick plays all guitars. The songs featured on this demo are "Our Roads Never Cross", "If You Change Your Mind" and "Demon In The Dim". You can also expect the ending for the song "the tales of King Solitude" that started with part 1:3 on the first album, continued with "the tales of King Solitude 2:3" on the second album, and now to be ended with "the tales of King Solitude 3:3" on the 3rd album.

== Records ==
- Clockwise - Nostalgia (1996)
- Clockwise - Naïve (1998)
