= War of Kings (disambiguation) =

War of Kings may refer to:

- War of Kings, comic book crossover storyline written by Dan Abnett and Andy Lanning, published by Marvel Comics, and set in Marvel's main shared universe
- War of Kings (album), 2015 album by Europe

== See also ==
- War of Kings, or Battle of Siddim, the conflict described in Book of Genesis
