= Always the Pretenders =

Single by Europe

from the album Secret Society
- B-side: "Always the Pretenders" (Album Version)
- Released: 11 October 2006
- Genre: Hard rock, heavy metal
- Length: 3:30
- Label: Sanctuary Records
- Songwriter(s): Joey Tempest / John Levén
- Producer(s): Europe

Europe singles chronology
"Hero" (2004)	"Always the Pretenders" (2006)	"Last Look at Eden" (2009)

"Always the Pretenders" is a 2006 single released by the Swedish rock band Europe. It is the first single from Europe's album Secret Society, and was released on 11 October 2006. The single peaked at number 2 on the Swedish singles chart.

The song is co-written by vocalist Joey Tempest and bassist John Levén, and was inspired by a phonecall Tempest received on 11 September 2001.

== Track listing ==
1. "Always the Pretenders" (Radio Edit)
2. "Always the Pretenders" (Album Version)
3. "Flames" (Live at B.B.King's, New York 2005)
4. "Superstitious" (Live at B.B.King's, New York 2005)

== Personnel ==
- Joey Tempest − vocals
- John Norum − guitars
- John Levén − bass guitar
- Mic Michaeli − keyboards
- Ian Haugland − drums

== Charts ==
=== Weekly charts ===
Chart (2006)	Peak position
Sweden (Sverigetopplistan)	2

=== Year-end charts ===
Chart (2006)	Position
Sweden (Sverigetopplistan)	89
