= 106.7 FM Rockklassiker =

Swedish rock radio station

Coordinates: 59.332788°N 18.064488°E

106.7 FM Rockklassiker is a Swedish rock radio station.

Rockklassiker (formerly Classic Hits) started out as a local radio station in Stockholm in 1994, and is today the second largest rock station in Sweden in terms of audience share. Its closest rival is Bandit Rock 106.3, another radio station based in Stockholm that mainly focuses on modern and alternative rock. Rockklassiker was elected "Radio station of the year 2001" by The Swedish Radio Academy.

106.7 FM Rockklassiker competes with nine other commercial stations in addition to six Government non-commercial stations. Its target group is 25- to 44-year-old males. Rockklassiker is today the largest radio station in this target. In Average Quarters (AQ) Rockklassiker is the 2nd largest commercial radio station in the market. Rockklassiker has been a consistent high performer in the ratings over the last couple of years.
