= Seven Doors Hotel =

Single by Europe

from the album Europe
- B-side: "Words of Wisdom"
- Released: 1983
- Genre: Heavy metal; power metal
- Length: 5:17
- Label: Victor Records
- Songwriter(s): Joey Tempest
- Producer(s): Europe, Erik Videgård, Thomas Erdtman

Europe singles chronology
"Seven Doors Hotel" (1983)	"Lyin' Eyes" (1983)

Audio sample
- file; help

"Seven Doors Hotel", written by Joey Tempest, was the first single released from the Swedish heavy metal band Europe's self-titled debut album. It was a big hit in Japan, reaching the Top 10. It was one of the first songs he ever wrote.

Tempest was inspired to write the song after watching the Italian horror film The Beyond.

In 1985 Europe recorded a new version of the song, which was used as a B-side for the single "Rock the Night". Later the version was included in Rock Candy Records reissue of The Final Countdown.

== Personnel ==
=== 1983 version ===
- Joey Tempest − vocals, keyboards
- John Norum − guitars
- John Levén − bass guitar
- Tony Reno − drums

=== 1985 version ===
- Joey Tempest − vocals
- John Norum − guitars
- John Levén − bass guitar
- Mic Michaeli − keyboards
- Ian Haugland − drums
