= Come This Madness =

Studio album by Europe
- Released: 25 September 2026
- Studios: RMV Studio, Stockholm
- Length: 41:19
- Labels: Silver Lining Music/Hell & Back
- Producer: Tom Dalgety

Europe chronology
Walk the Earth (2017)	Come This Madness (2026)

Singles from Come This Madness
- 1. "One on One" Released: 28 April 2026; 2. "The Cult of Ignorance" Released: 3 June 2026; 3. "Scandinavian Eyes" Released: 1 September 2026

Come This Madness is the twelfth studio album by the Swedish rock band Europe. It was released on 25 September 2026. The album was produced by Tom Dalgety and recorded at RMV Studio in Stockholm. It is their first album in nine years since Walk the Earth (2017).

== Track listing ==
No.	Title	Writer(s)	Length
1.	"One on One"	Joey Tempest; John Levén; Mic Michaeli	3:41
2.	"The Cult of Ignorance"	Michaeli; Tempest	3:31
3.	"Come This Madness"	Tempest; Levén; Tom Dalgety	4:02
4.	"This Time of Year"	Tempest; Michaeli; Dalgety	4:05
5.	"In a Different World"	Tempest; Levén	3:45
6.	"Scandinavian Eyes"	Tempest; Levén; Michaeli; Dalgety	4:51
7.	"Takin' It Back"	Tempest; Michaeli; Dalgety	3:46
8.	"In the Absence of Grace"	Michaeli; Tempest	1:28
9.	"The Angels Must Have Flown"	John Norum; Tempest; Dalgety	3:45
10.	"The Devil's Back"	Norum; Tempest; Michaeli; Dalgety	3:47
11.	"Nothing Can Follow This"	Tempest; Michaeli	4:38
Total length:			41:19

Bonus Tracks for Japan
No.	Title	Writer(s)	Length
12.	"Hold Your Head Up"	Tempest	4:00
13.	"Heavens Above"	Tempest; Norum; Dalgety	4:32
Total length:			49:51

== Personnel ==
Europe

- Joey Tempest – lead vocals, backing vocals
- John Norum – guitars, additional backing vocals
- Mic Michaeli – keyboards, orchestral arrangements, additional backing vocals
- John Levén – bass guitar
- Ian Haugland – drums

Guest musicians

- Mikael Åkerfeldt
- Tobias Forge
- Fredrik Åkesson

Technical personnel

- Tom Dalgety – production, engineering
- Mike Fraser – mixing
- Fraser Blanchflower – additional engineering
- Pontus Norgren – additional engineering
- Peer Stappe – additional engineering
- Martin Bustgaard – additional engineering
- Erik Arvinder – orchestra recording, orchestral arrangements, conducting
- Willem Bleeker – orchestra recording
- Jess Schmidt – mix assistant
- Ryan Smith – mastering

Artwork

- Design by Storm Studios

== Charts ==
Chart performance for Come This Madness
Chart (2026)	Peak position
Austrian Albums (Ö3 Austria)	5
Belgian Albums (Ultratop Flanders)	7
Belgian Albums (Ultratop Wallonia)	13
Dutch Albums (Album Top 100)	52
Finnish Albums (Suomen virallinen lista)	24
French Albums (SNEP)	57
French Rock & Metal Albums (SNEP)	3
German Albums (Offizielle Top 100)	9
German Rock & Metal Albums (Offizielle Top 100)	4
Italian Albums (FIMI)	29
Japanese Albums (Oricon)	29
Japanese Combined Albums (Oricon)	66
Japanese Download Albums (Billboard Japan)	41
Japanese Rock Albums (Oricon)	3
Japanese Top Albums Sales (Billboard Japan)	25
Norwegian Albums (IFPI Norge)	54
Norwegian Rock Albums (IFPI Norge)	4
Scottish Albums (Official Charts)	5
Spanish Albums (Promusicae)	16
Swedish Albums (Sverigetopplistan)	2
Swedish Hard Rock Albums (Sverigetopplistan)	1
Swiss Albums (Schweizer Hitparade)	2
UK Albums (Official Charts)	30
UK Independent Albums (Official Charts)	2
UK Rock & Metal Albums (Official Charts)	1
