= The Final Countdown (album) =

Studio album by Europe
- Released: 26 May 1986
- Recorded: September 1985 – March 1986
- Studios: Powerplay Studios, Zürich, Switzerland; Soundtrade Studios, Stockholm, Sweden; Mastersound Studios, Atlanta, US; Fantasy Studios, Berkeley, California, US
- Genres: Glam metal; hard rock
- Length: 39:49
- Label: Epic
- Producer: Kevin Elson

Europe chronology
Wings of Tomorrow (1984)	The Final Countdown (1986)	Out of This World (1988)

Singles from The Final Countdown
- 1. "The Final Countdown" Released: February 1986; 2. "Love Chaser" Released: August 1986 (Japan); 3. "Rock the Night" Released: November 1986; 4. "Carrie" Released: January 1987; 5. "Cherokee" Released: November 1987

The Final Countdown is the third studio album by the Swedish rock band Europe. Released on 26 May 1986 through Epic Records, the album was a commercial success, peaking at number 8 on the U.S. Billboard 200 chart and reaching high positions in charts worldwide. It was recorded at Powerplay Studios in Zürich, Soundtrade Studios in Stockholm, Mastersound Studios in Atlanta and Fantasy Studios in Berkeley. The Final Countdown is the first album to feature keyboardist Mic Michaeli and drummer Ian Haugland and the last to feature guitarist John Norum until 2004's Start from the Dark.

Five singles were released from the album: "The Final Countdown", "Love Chaser", "Rock the Night", "Carrie", and "Cherokee." The first single was responsible for launching Europe into mainstream popularity.

== Composition and recording ==
"Rock the Night" and "Ninja" were the first songs written for the album, and were premiered on the band's Wings of Tomorrow tour in 1984. "Rock the Night" was released as a single in Sweden in 1985, peaking at number 4 on the chart, and was also featured on the soundtrack EP for the Swedish film On the Loose the same year, together with the songs "On the Loose" and "Broken Dreams." "Rock the Night" and "On the Loose" would be re-recorded for inclusion on The Final Countdown along with "Ninja", all with slightly different lyrics.

With the national success of On the Loose and "Rock the Night", Europe went on a new tour around Sweden in 1985, with new songs "Danger on the Track", "Love Chaser" and the power ballad "Carrie" included in the setlist and ready to be recorded for the album. "Carrie" was co-written by Tempest and keyboardist Mic Michaeli during a jam session. The early version of the song consisted of only keyboards and vocals, and was performed that way on the 1985 tour, but the album version would feature the whole band.

The song "The Final Countdown" was based on an old keyboard riff that Tempest had composed as early as 1981–82, on a Korg Polysix keyboard he had borrowed from Michaeli. In 1985, bassist John Levén suggested that Tempest should write a song based on that riff. The lyrics were inspired by David Bowie's song "Space Oddity". The sound of the keyboard riff used in the recording was achieved by using a Yamaha TX-816 rack unit and a Roland JX-8P synthesizer. "I made a brassy sound from the JX-8P and used a factory sound from the Yamaha, and just layered them together", Michaeli said.

"Cherokee" was the last song written for the album, being written only a week before the band went to Switzerland to begin development for the album. Tempest said he had been inspired by the history of the Native Americans to write the song.

Development for the album began in September 1985 at Powerplay Studios in Zürich, Switzerland. At the suggestion of their record company, Epic Records, the band decided to work with American producer Kevin Elson, who had also help produce with other artists, including Journey and Lynyrd Skynyrd. Originally the band had approached Scorpions producer Dieter Dierks and Bon Jovi producer Bruce Fairbairn to produce the album, but in the end, they decided to go with Elson. Elson would also produce the band's sixth studio album, Start from the Dark in 2004.

As development for the album was in progress, vocalist Joey Tempest came down with a bad allergic reaction to bread products, which delayed the development for a while. In addition, Tempest decided to make changes to his diet, so he could complete his work for the album. The vocals for the title track were recorded at the Soundtrade Studios, Stockholm, Sweden, while the rest of the vocals were recorded at the Mastersound Studios, Atlanta, Georgia and Fantasy Studios, Berkeley, California.

The album was mixed in March 1986 at Fantasy Studios. Guitarist John Norum was not satisfied with the results, claiming that the keyboards had "buried" the rhythm guitars in the final mix.

== Release ==
The Final Countdown was the band's breakout album and granted Europe international recognition. Upon its release in May 1986, it sold very well in most European countries and peaked at No. 8 on the US Billboard 200 album chart. By 1994, it achieved triple Platinum status in the United States and received sales awards all over Europe.

When it was time to choose the first single from the album, Tempest suggested "The Final Countdown". Originally the band had never planned to release the song as a single, and some members wanted "Rock the Night" to be the first single. "The Final Countdown" was written to be an opening song for concerts, and they never thought it would be a hit. But when their record company Epic Records suggested that it should be the first single, the band decided to release it. It became a worldwide success, peaking at number 1 in 25 countries, including the United Kingdom, France, and West Germany. In the US, it peaked at number 8 on the Billboard Hot 100 and number 18 on the Mainstream Rock Tracks chart. The song has been a regular in Europe concerts ever since its live debut on the premiere of the band's Final Countdown Tour on 29 April 1986 in Gävle, Sweden and arguably became the band's most recognizable and popular song. One of the most memorable performances of the song took place in Stockholm, Sweden on 31 December 1999, as part of the Millennium celebrations.

"Love Chaser" was released as a single in Japan only, and was on the soundtrack for the movie Pride One. "Rock the Night" was released as the worldwide follow-up single to "The Final Countdown." It became a Top 10 hit in Germany, Holland, France, Ireland, and Switzerland, and peaked at number 30 on the Billboard Hot 100 chart and number 12 on the UK Singles Chart. The next single, "Carrie", peaked at number 3 on the Billboard Hot 100, their highest single on the chart to date. "Cherokee" was released as the last single from the album, peaking at number 72 on the Billboard Hot 100.

Eight of the ten tracks on the album were featured in the 2007 comedy film Hot Rod.

== Reception ==
Professional ratings
Review scores
Source	Rating
AllMusic	4.5/5 stars
The Collector's Guide to Heavy Metal	6/10
Kerrang!	2.5/5 stars

The Final Countdown received mixed reviews upon its release. Rolling Stone writer J. D. Considine wrote that "the words to 'The Final Countdown' make almost no sense whatsoever on paper, but there's genuine drama to the way Tempest's keening vocals surge through the mock-orchestral morass of synths and guitar. Maybe it's trite, maybe it's derivative, but it's also undeniably effective. From the stirring stadium schlock of 'Rock the Night' to the self-indulgent melodrama of 'Love Chaser', the best moments here are insidiously catchy, leaving you humming along against your better judgment". Howard Johnson of Kerrang! was not excited by the album and considered Europe "just bland and boring" and "boasting the most nauseating keyboard sound on a title track of all time".

A contemporary review by Doug Stone of AllMusic was more positive. He finds the title track "bombastically brilliant glorious garbage ... that could only spew from the vacuous '80s", but writes that the rest of the songs combines "heated drive and hot delivery to meld The Final Countdown into a unique portrait of propulsive prog and a worthy addition to any hard rock collection." Canadian journalist Martin Popoff remarks how the album "sounds very nice, rhythmic, even modern beyond its years, but it's also gutless and shamefully commercial". PopMatters' Ben Varkentine, on the contrary, criticized the production and the composition of "rock songs with half-assed keyboard lines smeared on them", which "aimed at being anthems but succeeded only in being derivative not only of other bands but of themselves."

== Tour ==
The first leg of the Swedish tour started in Gävle on 29 April 1986. The album had not been released yet because the cover art was not complete, but Europe was forced to start the scheduled tour. The album was eventually released on 26 May, the same day that the band played the last concert on the leg, at Solnahallen in Solna. The band did two concerts at Solnahallen, on 25 and 26 May. These concerts were filmed for a TV broadcast, which would later be released on VHS and DVD, entitled The Final Countdown Tour 1986. A 20th anniversary edition of the DVD was released in 2006. The promotional music video for "The Final Countdown" was shot partly during the soundchecks for those concerts and partly during the actual concerts.

Europe went on a Japanese tour in September 1986, playing four concerts in Tokyo and one concert each in Nagoya and Osaka. During that tour, guitarist and band co-founder John Norum told the other band members that he wanted to leave the band, due to musical differences and other disagreements with the band's manager, Thomas Erdtman. Norum agreed to stay in the band for the second leg of the Swedish tour, which started in Örebro on 26 September 1986, as well as a promotion tour around Europe including TV appearances and interviews. He made his last appearance with the band for a Sky Channel broadcast at the club Escape in Amsterdam, Netherlands on 31 October 1986.

Norum was then replaced by Kee Marcello, who had just left another Swedish rock band, Easy Action. At first Marcello had been hesitant to join Europe, because he had put a lot of work into Easy Action's upcoming album That Makes One. After some consideration he changed his mind and decided to join the band. He appeared in the music videos for "Rock the Night", "Cherokee" and "Carrie," before making his first TV appearance with the band at Peters Popshow in Dortmund, West Germany on 12 December 1986.

The European part of the tour started in Bergen, Norway on 24 January 1987 and ended in Genoa, Italy on 3 March 1987. A concert done at Hammersmith Odeon, London on 23 February, was filmed and released on video, entitled The Final Countdown World Tour.

On 15 April 1987, Europe started their first U.S. tour at the Warfield Theatre in San Francisco, California. The tour concluded in Philadelphia, Pennsylvania on 17 May 1987, as the band had been playing in 23 cities and traveling 14,565 km. A Swedish TV crew followed the band on the tour, producing the documentary Europe in America, which would be shown on TV and released on video.

Europe ended the Final Countdown Tour at the Roskilde Festival in Roskilde, Denmark on 4 July 1987.

== Track listing ==
All tracks are written by Joey Tempest, except "Carrie" by Tempest and Mic Michaeli.

Side one
No.	Title	Length
1.	"The Final Countdown"	5:11
2.	"Rock the Night"	4:03
3.	"Carrie"	4:30
4.	"Danger on the Track"	3:45
5.	"Ninja"	3:46

Side two
No.	Title	Length
6.	"Cherokee"	4:13
7.	"Time Has Come"	4:00
8.	"Heart of Stone"	3:46
9.	"On the Loose"	3:08
10.	"Love Chaser"	3:27
Total length:		39:49

=== Outtakes and bonus tracks ===
Another Tempest-written song that was recorded during the sessions, "On Broken Wings", was used as a B-side on the "Final Countdown" single. "On Broken Wings" would eventually be featured in Europe's compilation album 1982-1992, released in 1993.

Instrumental "Where Men Won't Dare", co-written by Tempest and John Levén, was an unfinished outtake which was included as a bonus feature on The Final Countdown Tour 1986: Live in Sweden – 20th Anniversary Edition DVD.

In 2001, Sony released a remastered version of the album with expanded liner notes and three bonus tracks, live takes of "The Final Countdown", "Danger on the Track" and "Carrie", taken from the Final Countdown World Tour home video that was taped at Hammersmith Odeon in London 1987.

In 2019, Rock Candy Records released a remastered version with another three bonus tracks and expanded liner notes, a 1985 version of "Seven Doors Hotel", b-side remix of a 1985 version of "Rock the Night" and "On Broken Wings"

== Personnel ==
Europe

- Joey Tempest – lead vocals
- John Norum – lead guitar, backing vocals
- John Levén – bass
- Mic Michaeli – keyboards, backing vocals
- Ian Haugland – drums, backing vocals
- Kee Marcello – rhythm guitar, backing vocals (live tracks on 2001 'Metal Masters' re-release only)

Production

- Kevin Elson – producer, engineer, mixing
- Wally Buck – engineer, mixing
- Bob Ludwig – mastering
- Michael Johansson – photography
- Les Katz – cover illustration
- Joel Zimmerman – art direction

== Charts ==
Chart (1986–1987)	Peak position
Australian Albums (Kent Music Report)	3
Austrian Albums (Ö3 Austria)	5
Canada Top Albums/CDs (RPM)	6
Dutch Albums (Album Top 100)	3
Finnish Albums (The Official Finnish Charts)	1
French Albums (SNEP)	10
German Albums (Offizielle Top 100)	6
Italian Albums (Musica e Dischi)	2
Japanese Albums (Oricon)	26
New Zealand Albums (RMNZ)	3
Norwegian Albums (VG-lista)	4
Spain (Spanish Albums Chart)	1
Swedish Albums (Sverigetopplistan)	1
Swiss Albums (Schweizer Hitparade)	1
UK Albums (Official Charts)	9
US Billboard 200	8

Chart (2009)	Peak position
Spanish Albums (Promusicae)	69

== Certifications ==
Sales certifications for The Final Countdown
Region	Certification	Certified units/sales
Australia (ARIA)	2× Platinum	140,000^{^}
Canada (Music Canada)	2× Platinum	200,000^{^}
Finland (Musiikkituottajat)	Platinum	71,707
France (SNEP)	2× Gold	200,000^{*}
Germany (BVMI)	Gold	250,000^{^}
Greece (IFPI Greece)	Gold	50,000^{^}
Italy (FIMI) sales since 2009	Gold	25,000^{‡}
Japan	—	307,500
Netherlands (NVPI)	Gold	50,000^{^}
New Zealand (RMNZ)	Gold	7,500^{^}
Norway (IFPI Norway)	Platinum	100,000
Portugal (AFP)	Gold	20,000^{^}
Spain (Promusicae)	4× Platinum	400,000^{^}
Sweden (GLF)	Platinum	100,000^{^}
Switzerland (IFPI Switzerland)	Platinum	50,000^{^}
United Kingdom (BPI)	Gold	100,000^{^}
United States (RIAA)	3× Platinum	3,000,000^{^}
^{*} Sales figures based on certification alone.^{^} Shipments figures based on certification alone.^{‡} Sales+streaming figures based on certification alone.
