= Europe (Europe album) =

Studio album by Europe
- Released: 14 March 1983
- Studio: The Electra Studio (Stockholm, Sweden)
- Genre: Heavy metal
- Length: 39:42
- Label: Hot
- Producer: Europe

Europe chronology
Europe (1983)	Wings of Tomorrow (1984)

Singles from Europe
- 1. "Seven Doors Hotel" / "Words of Wisdom" Released: 31 March 1983

Re-issue cover

Professional ratings
Review scores
Source	Rating
AllMusic	3/5 stars
The Collector's Guide to Heavy Metal	10/10
Metal Forces	(8/10)

Europe is the debut studio album by Swedish rock band Europe, released on 14 March 1983 by Hot Records.

== Track listing ==
All tracks are written by Joey Tempest, except where noted

Side one
No.	Title	Writer(s)	Length
1.	"In the Future to Come"		5:00
2.	"Farewell"		4:16
3.	"Seven Doors Hotel"		5:16
4.	"The King Will Return"		5:35
5.	"Boyazont" (instrumental)	John Norum, Eddie Meduza	2:32

Side two
No.	Title	Length
6.	"Children of This Time"	4:55
7.	"Words of Wisdom"	4:05
8.	"Paradize Bay"	3:53
9.	"Memories"	4:32

== Personnel ==
Europe

- Joey Tempest – vocals, keyboards, acoustic guitars
- John Norum – guitars
- John Levén – bass
- Tony Reno – drums, percussion

Production

- Europe – producer
- Erik Videgård – co-producer, engineer
- Thomas Erdtman – co-producer
- Lennart Dannstedt – photography
- Camilla B. – cover design

== Charts ==
Chart (1983)	Peak position
Japanese Albums (Oricon)	62
Swedish Albums (Sverigetopplistan)	8
