= Cherokee (Europe song) =

Single by Europe

from the album The Final Countdown
- B-side: Danger On The Track
- Released: November 1987
- Genre: Glam metal
- Length: 4:13 (Album Version); 3:49 (Edited Version)
- Label: Epic
- Songwriter: Joey Tempest
- Producer: Kevin Elson

Europe singles chronology
"Carrie" (1987)	"Cherokee" (1987)	"Superstitious" (1988)

Audio
- "Cherokee" on YouTube

"Cherokee" is a single by the Swedish rock band Europe, released in 1987. It was the fourth single released internationally from their third studio album The Final Countdown, and reached number 72 on the Billboard Hot 100 chart in the United States.

The song was written by vocalist Joey Tempest in 1985, and was in fact the last song written for the album. The video for "Cherokee" was filmed in September 1987, in Almería, Spain. It was filmed a half mile from where Sergio Leone shot the famous Clint Eastwood Spaghetti Western A Fistful of Dollars. When filming the scene where the horses run through the valley, someone accidentally set some brush near the set on fire. The entire video crew, including band members, had to fight the fire by quickly digging a trench around the fire to stop it spreading. The video is very historically inaccurate. It showed the Cherokee as plains Indians, living in teepees on the desert. The Cherokee originally lived in the wooded, southern Appalachian Mountains. They were forcibly moved to the wooded, rolling hills of eastern Oklahoma. The Cherokee never used teepees.

On 30 July 2007, "Cherokee" and "The Final Countdown" were used in a preview for Superbad following Raw.

At the beginning of the song, drummer Ian Haugland says: "Nu ska vi spela!" which means "We're gonna play now!" in Swedish.

== Cover versions ==
"Cherokee" was sampled in the song "I Believe" by the French electropop duo Galleon.

== Personnel ==
- Joey Tempest − vocals
- John Norum − guitar
- Mic Michaeli − synthesizers
- John Levén − bass
- Ian Haugland − drums

== Chart positions ==
Year	List	Peak	Ref.
1987	Billboard Hot 100	72	
