= Secret Society (album) =

Studio album by Europe
- Released: 25 October 2006
- Recorded: 2006
- Studio: Kingside Studios, Stockholm
- Genre: Hard rock
- Length: 45:58
- Label: Sanctuary Records; Victor (Japan)
- Producer: Europe

Europe chronology
The Final Countdown Tour 1986 (2004)	Secret Society (2006)	Extended Versions (2007)

Singles from Secret Society
- 1. "Always the Pretenders" Released: 11 October 2006

Professional ratings
Review scores
Source	Rating
AllMusic	3.5/5 stars

Secret Society is the seventh studio album by the Swedish rock band Europe. It was released on 25 October 2006 by Sanctuary Records. "We think it's one of the strongest albums that Europe has ever done," vocalist Joey Tempest said, "There is definitely some more melodic stuff on this one. Start from the Dark was very raw and made a statement, which is cool but for us it felt like a debut album in a way, so we wanted to branch out a bit on this one and take it to new levels."

== Track listing ==
No.	Title	Writer(s)	Length
1.	"Secret Society"	Joey Tempest	3:37
2.	"Always the Pretenders"	Tempest, John Levén	3:55
3.	"The Getaway Plan"	Tempest, John Norum	3:53
4.	"Wish I Could Believe"	Tempest, Mic Michaeli	3:35
5.	"Let the Children Play"	Tempest, Michaeli	4:12
6.	"Human After All"	Tempest, Norum	4:14
7.	"Love Is Not the Enemy"	Tempest, Norum	4:19
8.	"A Mother's Son"	Tempest	4:49
9.	"Forever Travelling"	Tempest, Michaeli	4:12
10.	"Brave and Beautiful Soul"	Tempest	3:48
11.	"Devil Sings the Blues"	Tempest, Michaeli	5:24

Japanese edition bonus track
No.	Title	Length
12.	"Start from the Dark" (live)

== Personnel ==
- Joey Tempest – vocals, Pro Tools programming and additional engineering
- John Norum – guitars
- John Levén – bass
- Mic Michaeli – keyboards, Pro Tools programming and additional engineering
- Ian Haugland – drums
- Archie Lamprell – guest vocals on "Let the Children Play"
- Europe – producer
- Lennart Östlund – engineer
- Stefan Glaumann – mixing
- George Marino – mastering
- Peer Stappe – logic programming
- StormStudios – cover design and photography
- Lee Baker – artwork
- Dan Abbott – illustrations
- Erik Weiss – photography

== Charts ==
Chart (2006)	Peak position
French Albums (SNEP)	195
Italian Albums (FIMI)	41
Swedish Albums (Sverigetopplistan)	4
Swiss Albums (Schweizer Hitparade)	93
UK Independent Albums (OCC)	41
