= Superstitious (song) =

Single by Europe

from the album Out of This World
- B-side: "Lights and Shadows"
- Released: 1 August 1988
- Genre: Glam metal
- Length: 4:35 (Album Version); 4:11 (Rock Edit - Video Version); 3:51 (CHR Edit)
- Label: Epic
- Songwriter: Joey Tempest
- Producer: Ron Nevison

Europe singles chronology
"Cherokee" (1987)	"Superstitious" (1988)	"Open Your Heart" (1988)

Music video
- "Superstitious" on YouTube

"Superstitious" is a 1988 single released by the Swedish rock band Europe. It was the first single released from the album Out of This World. It performed moderately well, peaking at #31 on the US Billboard Hot 100, #9 on the Mainstream Rock Tracks and #34 on the UK Singles Chart. It was the last song by Europe to chart on the US Hot 100.

The video for "Superstitious" was filmed at Hempstead House, on Long Island, New York. When performing the song live, Europe often include a part of Bob Marley's "No Woman, No Cry" in the middle of the song.

== Personnel ==
- Joey Tempest − lead vocals
- Kee Marcello − guitars, backing vocals
- Mic Michaeli − organ, synthesizers, backing vocals
- John Levén − bass
- Ian Haugland − drums, backing vocals

== Charts ==
Chart (1988)	Peak position
Australian Singles Chart	45
Canadian Singles Chart	35
Dutch Top 40	10
French Singles Chart	33
German Singles Chart	21
Irish Singles Chart	24
Italy Airplay (Music & Media)	11
Norwegian Singles Chart	1
South African Singles Chart	12
Swedish Singles Chart	1
Swiss Singles Chart	9
UK Singles Chart	34
US Billboard Hot 100	31
US Mainstream Rock Tracks	9
