= War of Kings (album) =

Studio album by Europe
- Released: 2 March 2015
- Recorded: October–November 2014
- Genre: Hard rock, heavy metal
- Length: 48:59
- Label: UDR; JVC (Japan)
- Producer: Dave Cobb

Europe chronology
Bag of Bones (2012)	War of Kings (2015)	Walk the Earth (2017)

Singles from War of Kings
- 1. "War of Kings" Released: 4 February 2015; 2. "Days of Rock 'N' Roll" Released: 13 March 2015

War of Kings is the tenth studio album by the Swedish rock band Europe. It was released on 2 March 2015 by UDR Records.

== Background ==
In late 2014, the band signed a deal with record label UDR. Tempest explained: "We're really excited to be working with the people at UDR. A very credible label and I am impressed with their work building a future and a solid foundation for their Artists". UDR president and owner Ulrike Rudolph expressed her delight in capturing the band for the label. She said: "We are always looking to expand the label's stable of bands with quality, not quantity, and Europe represent the finest in supremely written hard rock music. They are a group who refuse to rest on their past and continue to grow as artists and musicians, so we are absolutely delighted they have come to us."

Europe band members contacted Dave Cobb in 2014. They met up in Stockholm and rented vintage recording gear from the band The Soundtrack of Our Lives. Joey Tempest recorded demos on his phone, which were of a poor audio quality. At first Cobb did not want to hear any of Tempest's demos, but in the end he agreed to. The next day, Cobb got in touch with the band and said he was impressed by the songs and had a few ideas on how to fix them. He joined the band in the studio and they all worked together on the songs. They changed the arrangements on 5 tracks and also wrote bits and segments for others. Cobb was involved in the writing of "War of Kings" and "Praise You", as well as providing a keyboard intro on "Second Day". The band ended up recording 12 songs.

== Composition and lyrics ==
The song "War of Kings" originates from a riff composed by John Levén. Tempest started to build a song from that riff and Cobb was involved to write lyrics to it. While creating the song, Tempest had no lyrics and just sang a wordless vocal melody; later on, however, he started thinking about the adventure novel The Long Ships (1941–1945) by Frans G. Bengtsson, which he had read as a kid. He thought it would be a great idea to write lyrics about the early days of his homeland, involving Vikings and battles between Norwegians, Danes and Swedes. Tempest explained: "There were important battles early on, where self-proclaimed kings were fighting elected kings. It was chaos in Scandinavia. I thought it was a fascinating background for a lyric, and the melodies and the riffs lend themselves to it. So that's how it started."

"Hole In My Pocket" also originates from a riff by Levén, while "The Second Day" and "California 405" were developed from riffs by keyboardist Mic Michaeli. "California 405" is a song about hoping and dreaming. It was inspired by time the band had spent in California during the late Eighties and the early Nineties while driving on the Interstate 405 highway. Tempest explained: "When I go to California now, everything has changed. The late 80s and beginning of the 90s, it was a completely different place as far as music and MTV, airplay and rock music on radio were concerned. But I still get a great feeling driving south. Things have changed but there is still hope. You can still feel free. Get in the rental car, put some great music on and drive south in California and feel that sense of freedom, it's still there!" "Days of Rock 'N' Roll" originates from an idea which Tempest came up with in 1988 as a keyboard riff. It was called "Out of This World" and the riff had a fanfare pattern; Tempest originally had in mind to make a fanfare kind of song out of it. The riff was never turned into a song at the time, but the band named their album Out of This World (1988) after Tempest's title idea. In 2014, the band picked up the old riff and tried it on guitar, with a different tempo; Tempest also wrote new lyrics about the rise, fall and resurrection of rock'n'roll.

"Rainbow Bridge" was born out a jam between Tempest and Michaeli, where Tempest played drums and Michaeli played keyboards. Later on, they took out their favourite parts of the jam and wrote a song based on them. Tempest wrote fictional lyrics about a bridge in Tokyo called Rainbow Bridge, which he saw from a skybar. "Angels (With Broken Hearts)" originates from a riff composed by John Norum. The song was finished later in the studio with the full band and Cobb. During the writing process, the band found out that Jack Bruce had died. Moved by his passing, the band and Cobb rewrote the lyrics, whose final version was about people passing away in others' lives. "Light It Up" also originates from a riff by Norum. "Vasastan" is an instrumental written by Norum and Michaeli. It was named after Vasastan, the district in Stockholm where PanGaia Studios is located.

== Album artwork and release ==
After toying around with album title ideas, the band decided on "War of Kings" because of the opening track on the album, which everyone saw as special. The band then decided to contact London-based artist Paul Tippet, as they had been impressed by Tippet's artwork for the first album by Black Star Riders. The band sent him the song "War of Kings" and the lyrics to it, but they insisted that he not use elements such as swords, fire or Vikings, but only contemporary imagery such as presidents, kings and businessmen; they also requested him to use chess-related symbols. Tippett photographed a man in a suit and enhanced his photo through CGI; the band only made minor tweaks to the design.

The title track "War of Kings" was released as the first single from the album. The song was premiered exclusively on Planet Rock radio station on 30 January 2015. at 8:10 a.m. and it was released as a digital download on 4 February 2015. The music video for the single was directed by Patric Ullaeus and was premiered on 9 February 2015. Two more songs, "Nothin' to Ya" and "Days of Rock 'N' Roll", were streamed on the official VH1 website until the morning of 27 February 2015. The album was released in United Kingdom on 2 March, in Japan on 4 March through JVC, in Europe on 6 March and in the United States on 10 March 2015. It was released in four different formats: CD digipack, CD jewelcase, vinyl LP and digital download. All versions of the album include 11 songs, except for the digipack CD and Japanese versions, which include the final instrumental track "Vasastan" as a bonus. A limited edition boxset of the album was released on 6 March in Germany and EU countries, on 9 March in the United Kingdom, and on 28 April 2015 in the United States. It includes the Deluxe Edition of the album, an extended 7-inch- sized booklet, a "Making of" DVD ("War of Kings – How we Did it"), a t-shirt, a postcard and a sticker."Days of Rock 'N' Roll" was released as the second single on 13 March 2016. Its music video was directed by Ullaeus and features footage of the band performing in Manchester and Wolverhampton. The video was premiered on 27 April 2015. On the same day, a limited edition CD-single was released through Europe's own Stereo Boutique Shop. On 4 December in North America and in Australia on 27 November 2015, the band released a Special Edition of the album which includes the original album and a DVD/Blu-ray of the band's performance on Wacken Open Air in 2015. The set was released in three different formats: a 2-disc CD/DVD ecobook, a 2-disc CD/Blu-ray ecobook, and a limited edition deluxe package including the CD, the DVD, the Blu-ray and a photo-book. Also, an audio-only edition of the Wacken Open Air performance was released digitally. Preorders for Special Edition of "War of Kings" album began on 21 October 2015. The live video form "Nothin' to Ya" was also released on the record label's YouTube channel.

== Track listing ==
No.	Title	Writer(s)	Length
1.	"War of Kings"	Joey Tempest, John Levén, Dave Cobb	4:36
2.	"Hole in My Pocket"	Tempest, Levén	3:42
3.	"The Second Day"	Tempest, Mic Michaeli	5:23
4.	"Praise You"	Tempest, Michaeli, Cobb	4:34
5.	"Nothin' to Ya"	Tempest, John Norum, Michaeli, Levén, Ian Haugland	3:54
6.	"California 405"	Tempest, Michaeli	4:31
7.	"Days of Rock 'N' Roll"	Tempest	3:05
8.	"Children of the Mind"	Tempest, Michaeli, Cobb	4:30
9.	"Rainbow Bridge"	Tempest, Michaeli	3:16
10.	"Angels (With Broken Hearts)"	Tempest, Michaeli, Norum, Levén, Haugland, Cobb	5:19
11.	"Light It Up"	Tempest, Norum, Levén	6:10

CD digipak/Japanese edition bonus track
No.	Title	Writer(s)	Length
12.	"Vasastan" (Instrumental)	Michaeli, Norum	5:11

=== War of Kings: Special Edition ===
War of Kings album
No.	Title	Writer(s)	Length
1.	"War of Kings"	Tempest, Levén, Cobb	4:36
2.	"Hole in My Pocket"	Tempest, Levén	3:42
3.	"The Second Day"	Tempest, Michaeli	5:23
4.	"Praise You"	Tempest, Michaeli, Cobb	4:34
5.	"Nothin' to Ya"	Tempest, Norum, Michaeli, Levén, Haugland	3:54
6.	"California 405"	Tempest, Michaeli	4:31
7.	"Days of Rock 'n' Roll"	Tempest	3:05
8.	"Children of the Mind"	Tempest, Michaeli, Cobb	4:30
9.	"Rainbow Bridge"	Tempest, Michaeli	3:16
10.	"Angels (With Broken Hearts)"	Tempest, Michaeli, Norum, Levén, Haugland, Cobb	5:19
11.	"Light It Up"	Tempest, Norum, Levén	6:10
12.	"Vasastan" (Instrumental)	Michaeli, Norum	5:11

DVD/Blu-ray with performance on Wacken Open Air 2015
No.	Title	Writer(s)	Length
1.	"War of Kings"	Tempest, Levén, Cobb	4:49
2.	"Hole in My Pocket"	Tempest, Levén	3:50
3.	"Superstitious"	Tempest	5:47
4.	"Scream of Anger"	Tempest, Marcel Jacob	4:35
5.	"Last Look at Eden"	Tempest, Andreas Carlsson	4:46
6.	"The Second Day"	Tempest, Michaeli	4:51
7.	"Firebox"	Tempest, Michaeli	4:24
8.	"Sign of the Times"	Tempest	5:22
9.	"Praise You"	Tempest, Michaeli, Cobb	4:43
10.	"The Beast"	Tempest, Levén	4:49
11.	"Ready or Not"	Tempest	4:44
12.	"Girl from Lebanon"	Tempest	4:53
13.	"Nothin' to Ya"	Tempest, Norum, Michaeli, Levén, Haugland	3:49
14.	"Let the Good Times Rock"	Tempest	4:49
15.	"Rock the Night"	Tempest	6:49
16.	"Days of Rock'N'Roll"	Tempest	3:48
17.	"The Final Countdown"	Tempest	6:07

== Personnel ==
Personnel taken from War of Kings liner notes.

Europe

- Joey Tempest – lead vocals
- John Norum – guitars
- John Levén – bass guitar
- Mic Michaeli – keyboards
- Ian Haugland – drums

Production

- Produced by Dave Cobb
- Engineered by John Netti
- Mixed by John Netti, Vance Powell & Eddie Spear
- Mastered by Peter Lyman
- Additional overdubs recorded by Peer Stappe and Max Lorentz

== Charts ==
Chart (2015)	Peak position
Austrian Albums (Ö3 Austria)	27
Belgian Albums (Ultratop Flanders)	58
Belgian Albums (Ultratop Wallonia)	83
Dutch Albums (Album Top 100)	35
Finnish Albums (Suomen virallinen lista)	38
French Albums (SNEP)	69
German Albums (Offizielle Top 100)	23
Italian Albums (FIMI)	41
Norwegian Albums (VG-lista)	38
Scottish Albums (OCC)	42
Spanish Albums (Promusicae)	41
Swedish Albums (Sverigetopplistan)	2
Swiss Albums (Schweizer Hitparade)	6
UK Albums (OCC)	50
UK Independent Albums (OCC)	8
UK Rock & Metal Albums (OCC)	5
US Independent Albums (Billboard)	44
US Top Rock Albums (Billboard)	18

== Release history ==
Region	Date	Label	Format	Catalog
Japan	4 March 2015	Victor	CD	VICP-65293
Europe	6 March 2015	UDR Records	Digipak CD, DVD, T-Shirt, Photoalbum, Postcard, Sticker	UDR 0492
Europe	10 March 2015	UDR Records	LP	UDR 0483
Taiwan	4 September 2015	Magnum Records	CD	MVP-65293
