= Rock the Night (song) =

1985 single by Europe

Single by Europe

from the album On The Loose
- B-side: "Seven Doors Hotel (re-recorded version)"
- Released: March 1985
- Genre: Glam metal, heavy metal
- Length: 4:03
- Label: Epic
- Songwriter: Joey Tempest
- Producer: Europe

Europe singles chronology
"Open Your Heart" (1984)	"Rock the Night" (1985)	"The Final Countdown" (1986)

"Rock the Night"

Single by Europe

from the album The Final Countdown
- B-side: "Seven Doors Hotel (re-recorded version)"
- Released: November 1986: January 1987 (UK); April 1987 (US)
- Length: 4:03
- Label: Epic
- Songwriter: Joey Tempest
- Producer: Kevin Elson

Europe singles chronology
"Love Chaser" (1986)	"Rock the Night" (1986)	"Carrie" (1987)

Music video
- "Rock the Night" on YouTube

"Rock the Night" is a song by Swedish rock band Europe, first released as a single in 1985. The song was written by vocalist Joey Tempest in 1984 and premiered on the band's Wings of Tomorrow tour the same year.

The song was released in two different versions, just more than a year and a half apart from each other- in 1985 as a single from the soundtrack to the Swedish film On the Loose, and in 1986 as the second international single from the album The Final Countdown. The original 1985 release has a rawer, more metallic hard rock sound than the more polished version released from The Final Countdown the following year. The B-side for both releases was a 1985 re-recording of the band's debut single, "Seven Doors Hotel".

The 1986 release became a Top 10 hit in France, Germany, Holland, Spain, Belgium, Ireland and Switzerland, and peaked at #12 on the UK Singles Chart and #30 on the Billboard Hot 100 chart in the United States in early 1987.

The song was included in the 2007 film Hot Rod and the European version of the Nintendo DS game Guitar Hero: On Tour.

== Music videos ==
There were two music videos released for "Rock the Night," one corresponding to each of the different versions.

The original 1985 version, apparently directly incorporated into the On the Loose film, features the band performing the song on stage, interspersed with shots of various audience members singing along and otherwise observing/reacting to the song.

The second video was directed by Nick Morris and shot at the Hard Rock Cafe in Stockholm. It was the first Europe music video to feature the band's new guitarist Kee Marcello, since the original guitarist John Norum (who had recorded the guitar parts) had left the band weeks before the video shoot. The video begins with Europe arriving on their tour bus and walking into the Hard Rock Cafe, where the people inside are watching a video... of Europe's "Rock the Night." Some customers start recognizing them. Joey begins singing while the band is looking at the Cafe's order menu. The other band members use forks and other improvised "instruments" to mime the music. The rest of the people inside soon become a crowd, clapping and cheering them on. Live footage was also included, although overdubbed by the studio version of the song. After the chorus, Joey uses a ketchup bottle as an imaginary microphone, before the waiter delivers a real wireless one. Right before the solo, Kee removes a guitar from the Cafe's wall. They take the stage during the solo and perform the remainder of the song.

== Personnel ==
- Joey Tempest − vocals
- John Norum − guitar
- Mic Michaeli − synthesizers
- John Levén − bass
- Ian Haugland − drums

== Chart positions ==
Year	List	Peak	Ref.
1985	Swedish Singles Chart	4	
1986	Spanish Singles Chart	6	
1986	Belgium Singles Chart	2	
1986	Dutch Top 40	2	
1986	French Singles Chart	7	
1986	German Singles Chart	6	
1986	Swiss Singles Chart	6	
1987	UK Singles Chart	12	
1987	Irish Singles Chart	9	
1987	US Billboard Hot 100	30	
1987	US Mainstream Rock (Billboard)	22	
1987	Australia (Kent Music Report)	22	

== Certifications ==
Region	Certification	Certified units/sales
France (SNEP)	Silver	250,000^{*}
^{*} Sales figures based on certification alone.
