= Carrie (Europe song) =

1987 single by Europe

Single by Europe

from the album The Final Countdown
- B-side: "Love Chaser"
- Released: April 1987 (UK); July 1987 (US)
- Recorded: 1986
- Genre: Soft rock
- Length: 4:30 (album version); 3:09 (radio edit); 3:50 (demo version)
- Label: Epic
- Songwriters: Mic Michaeli; Joey Tempest
- Producer: Kevin Elson

Europe singles chronology
"Rock the Night" (1986)	"Carrie" (1987)	"Cherokee" (1987)

Music video
- "Carrie" on YouTube

"Carrie" is a power ballad by the Swedish rock band Europe released in 1987. It was the third single released internationally from the album The Final Countdown and was a Top 30 hit in several territories worldwide. In the US, it is their highest-charting song on the Billboard Hot 100 chart—peaking at #3 (#1 on the Radio and Records chart) during the fall of 1987, outperforming the band's most internationally successful song, "The Final Countdown". It also reached #36 on the Billboard Adult Contemporary chart. The track on the B-side of the 7" single was "Love Chaser".

== Personnel ==
- Joey Tempest − vocals
- John Norum − guitar
- Mic Michaeli − synthesizers
- John Levén − bass
- Ian Haugland − drums

== Chart positions ==
Chart (1987)	Peak position
Austrian Singles Chart	15
Canada RPM Top 100 Singles	9
Dutch Top 40	14
French Singles Chart	11
German Singles Chart	22
Irish Singles Chart	10
Swiss Singles Chart	10
UK Singles Chart	22
US Billboard Hot 100	3
US Album Rock Tracks (Billboard)	35
US Billboard Adult Contemporary	36

Year-end chart (1987)	Position
US Top Pop Singles (Billboard)	56
