= The Final Countdown (song) =

1986 single by Europe

Single by Europe

from the album The Final Countdown
- B-side: "On Broken Wings"
- Released: 14 February 1986; 19 May 1986 (US)
- Recorded: 1985
- Genre: Hard rock; arena rock; glam metal; synth-rock
- Length: 5:09 (album version); 4:56 (video version); 4:03 (radio edit)
- Label: Epic
- Songwriter: Joey Tempest
- Producer: Kevin Elson

Europe singles chronology
"Rock the Night" (1985)	"The Final Countdown" (1986)	"Love Chaser" (1986)

Music video
- "The Final Countdown" on YouTube

Audio sample
- file; help

"The Final Countdown" is a song by the Swedish rock band Europe, released in 1986.

It was the debut single from the studio album of the same name, and became a global hit though the band was uncertain about the song due to it being somewhat atypical of their previous more aggressive, guitar oriented sound. The music video by Nick Morris, made to promote the single, has received over 1.4 billion views on YouTube.

"The Final Countdown" was based on a keyboard riff the band's vocalist Joey Tempest wrote in the early 1980s, with lyrics inspired by David Bowie's "Space Oddity". The song "Pictures", from the 2017 album Walk the Earth, is a sequel to "The Final Countdown".

== Origin and recording ==
The song was based on a keyboard riff which Joey Tempest had written, as early as 1981 or 1982, with a Korg Polysix keyboard which he had borrowed from keyboardist Mic Michaeli. In 1985, bassist John Levén suggested that Tempest should write a song based on that riff. Tempest recorded a demo version of the song and played it for the other band members. At first, the members expressed mixed reactions to it, including guitarist John Norum who was put off by the synth intro but later said that he was glad that they didn't listen to him. Tempest described their uncertainty: "Some of the guys in the band thought it was too different for a rock band. But in the end, I fought hard to make sure it got used."

The song's lyrics were inspired by David Bowie's song "Space Oddity". The sound of the keyboard riff used in the recording was achieved by using a Yamaha TX-816 rack unit and a Roland JX-8P synthesizer, as described by Michaeli: "I made a brassy sound from the JX-8P and used a factory sound from the Yamaha, and just layered them together."

When it was time to choose the first single from the album The Final Countdown, Tempest suggested the song "The Final Countdown". The band had not originally planned to release the song as a single, and some members wanted "Rock the Night" to be the first single. "The Final Countdown" was written to be an opening song for concerts, and they never thought it would be a hit. When their record company Epic Records suggested, however, that it should be the first single, the band decided to release it.

Tempest stated in 2005 he was pleased by the song's enduring popularity, especially in sporting events, and explained its origins:

We were putting out our third album and we wanted a really 'grand' opening for the show. So, I had that 'riff' tucked away in a drawer since my college years and I took it out, found a tempo for it, wrote lyrics, and it turned out to be a great opening for that album and for the show, as well. Nowadays, we don't rehearse it, but when we play it live, it is still just so amazing! It does communicate so well with the audience and we really love playing it.

In 2009, Tempest told the BBC's Liam Allen how he was influenced by hard rock group UFO and wanted to blend keyboards and guitar, and aimed for a feel similar to the "sort of a galloping theme like Iron Maiden had on The Number of the Beast album on quite a few songs" which he felt "sort of worked out nicely" with "The Final Countdown". The song is set in the key of F♯ minor.

== Release and reception ==
"The Final Countdown" became a success on the charts worldwide after its release during 1986 and 1987, reaching number one in 25 countries (including the UK, where it spent two weeks at the top and is Europe's only Top 10 hit to date), and is widely regarded as the band's most popular and recognizable song. The single reached number 8 on the US Billboard Hot 100 chart, and is the most successful song from the album on the Album Rock Tracks chart, peaking at number 18 (and charting for 20 weeks). The song is also the band's highest-charting single in Australia and Canada, peaking at number 2 and at number 5.

Upon its release in the US, Billboard, in a "New and Noteworthy" singles review, called it "a Pan-European smash by a Swedish quintet, whose mixture of space fantasy, spaghetti Western, flailing guitars, and all-American-style album rock tenor is a marketing man's dream of commercial pop. Resistance is useless." Retrospectively, VH1 ranked it at number 66 on their 2009 list of the best hard rock songs of all time. In 2004, however, Blender had listed "The Final Countdown" as the 27th worst song ever, while VH1 the same year included it at 16 on the list of the 50 Most Awesomely Bad Songs... Ever.

== Music video ==
The music video, directed by Nick Morris, contains footage from two concerts the band did at Solnahallen in Solna, Sweden on 26 and 27 May 1986, as well as some extra footage filmed at the sound checks for those concerts.

== Live performances ==
The song has been a regular in Europe concerts ever since its live debut on the premiere of their Final Countdown Tour in April 1986. One of the most memorable performances of the song took place in Stockholm, Sweden on 31 December 1999, as part of the Millennium celebrations, as it was the first, and to date only, Europe performance with both of the band's lead guitarists, the original guitarist John Norum and his replacement, Kee Marcello.

== Personnel ==
Adapted from the album's liner notes.

- Joey Tempest – vocals
- John Norum – guitars
- Mic Michaeli – synthesizers
- John Levén – bass
- Ian Haugland – drums

== Instruments and gear ==
On "The Final Countdown" album, John Norum played a 1965 Fender Stratocaster plugged into a 100-watt Marshall JCM800 as well as a Boss SD-1 and a Boss DS-1. During "The Final Countdown" tour, Norum played a modified Olympic White Fender Stratocaster in the music video and on tour. This guitar includes a DiMarzio FS-1 pickup and a DiMarzio HS-3 pickup, a modified Callaham bridge, an extended fret board giving the guitar 22 frets, and an EMG afterburner boost system was installed.

On both the single and on stage, John Levén used a pick on a 1963 Fender Precision Bass colored blue and black. He acquired the electric bass in 1984.

The keyboards for "The Final Countdown" single and tour were created using a variety of synthesizers that played the brass riff and backing pads. The synth brass was created by using an edited "Stab Brass" preset on the Roland JX-8P and doubled with a stock brass sound on the Yamaha TX816 (a rack unit containing 8 TF-1 modules) that used frequency modulation. Those would simultaneously be played on a Yamaha KX76 midi controller. The ethereal synth pads and glass bells for the single were played on a PPG Wave 2.2. Throughout "The Final Countdown" tour, Mic played a Roland JX-10 and a Roland JX-8P to play the ethereal synth pad parts live.

== Charts ==
The song reached number one in 25 countries, including the United Kingdom, and was certified gold in that country in 1986. In the United States, the song peaked at number 8 on the Billboard Hot 100 and number 18 on the Billboard Album Rock Tracks chart.

=== Weekly charts ===
Weekly chart performance
Chart (1986–1987)	Peak position
Australia (Kent Music Report)	2
Austria (Ö3 Austria Top 40)	1
Belgium (Ultratop 50 Flanders)	1
Canada Retail Singles (The Record)	1
Canada Top Singles (RPM)	5
Europe (European Hot 100 Singles)	1
Finland (Suomen virallinen lista)	1
France (SNEP)	1
Ireland (IRMA)	1
Italy (FIMI)	1
Netherlands (Dutch Top 40)	1
Netherlands (Single Top 100)	1
New Zealand (Recorded Music NZ)	12
Norway (VG-lista)	4
South Africa (Springbok Radio)	1
Spain (AFYVE)	1
Sweden (Sverigetopplistan)	1
Switzerland (Schweizer Hitparade)	1
UK Singles (Official Charts)	1
US Billboard Mainstream Rock Tracks	18
US Billboard Hot 100	8
US Cash Box	10
West Germany (GfK)	1

Weekly chart performance in 2015
Chart (2015)	Peak position
US Billboard Hard Rock Digital Songs	1

Chart (2020)	Peak position
Japan Hot 100 (Billboard)	59

Chart (2023)	Peak position
Hungary (Single Top 40)	30
Poland (Polish Airplay Top 100)	49

=== Year-end charts ===
1986 year-end chart performance
Chart (1986)	Position
Austria (Ö3 Austria Top 40)	28
Belgium (Ultratop 50 Flanders)	4
Europe (European Hot 100)	22
France (SNEP)	3
Netherlands (Dutch Top 40)	2
Netherlands (Single Top 100)	1
Switzerland (Schweizer Hitparade)	13
UK Singles (OCC)	16
West Germany (Media Control)	9

1987 year-end chart performance
Chart (1987)	Position
Australia (Australian Music Report)	10
Austria (Ö3 Austria Top 40)	18
Canada Top Singles (RPM)	46
Europe (European Hot 100 Singles)	29
South Africa (Springbok Radio)	7

== Certifications and sales ==
Certifications and sales
Region	Certification	Certified units/sales
Canada (Music Canada)	Gold	50,000^{^}
Denmark (IFPI Danmark)	Platinum	90,000^{‡}
France (SNEP)	Platinum	1,000,000
Germany (BVMI)	Gold	250,000^{‡}
Italy (FIMI) sales since 2009	Platinum	70,000^{‡}
Japan (RIAJ) 2003 digital release	Gold	100,000^{*}
Netherlands (NVPI)	Platinum	100,000^{^}
Portugal (AFP)	Platinum	60,000
Spain (Promusicae)	Platinum	20,000^{*}
United Kingdom (BPI) Physical and digital combined sales	Platinum	600,000^{‡}
^{*} Sales figures based on certification alone.^{^} Shipments figures based on certification alone.^{‡} Sales+streaming figures based on certification alone.

== "The Final Countdown 2000" ==
"The Final Countdown 2000"

Single by Europe

from the album 1982–2000
- B-side: "The Final Countdown" (Original Radio Edit)
- Released: 7 December 1999
- Length: 3:47
- Label: Epic
- Songwriter: Joey Tempest
- Producers: Brian Rawling; Gary Miller

Europe singles chronology
"Sweet Love Child" (1993)	"The Final Countdown 2000" (1999)	"Got to Have Faith" (2004)

In 1999, the dance remix "The Final Countdown 2000" was released. It was produced by Brian Rawling, who had previously had success with "Believe" by Cher. The band's reaction to the remix was less than enthusiastic. "That remix was a disaster", drummer Ian Haugland said, "I wouldn't pass water on it if it was on fire!" In a 2013 interview with The National, Joey Tempest commented on the remix, saying, "The band were not happy with it. We were trying to get some other people to do the remix and it just didn't pan out, so it ended up becoming a last-minute thing."

=== Chart positions ===
Chart (1999–2000)	Peak position
Australia (ARIA)	33
Finland (Suomen virallinen lista)	12
Germany (GfK)	35
Netherlands (Single Top 100)	60
Norway (VG-lista)	12
Sweden (Sverigetopplistan)	6
Switzerland (Schweizer Hitparade)	33
UK Singles (Official Charts)	36

=== Year-end charts ===
Chart (1999)	Position
Sweden (Sverigetopplistan)	99

== Industry awards ==
YouTube Billion Views Award

Year	Nominee/Work	Award	Ref.
2022	The Final Countdown	Won	

== Legacy ==
The song is a favourite at sporting events; it is also often played at sports championship events and victory parades for winning teams of professional sports leagues and college tournaments in front of crowds who sing along to the lyrics. It has also become a staple of high school and college pep bands for the same purpose.

On 26 December 1987, the Hellenic Broadcasting Corporation (ΕΡΤ) used the song as the theme for the documentary The Road to Glory about EuroBasket 1987, which was won by the Greece men's national basketball team. Since then, the song is considered by fans as the unofficial anthem of the team.

The song was used as entrance music for professional wrestler Bryan Danielson on the independent circuit and in Ring of Honor (ROH) until September 2010, and again occasionally in All Elite Wrestling (AEW) since 2023.

On 2 October 1990, just a few hours before German reunification, the English segment of the international radio broadcaster for the former East Germany, RBI, played the intro of the song while the female voice announced: "Our broadcast came to you from Radio Berlin International, the voice of the disappearing German Democratic Republic".

The most popular radio station in Israel, Galei Tzahal, had a daily program between 2009 and 2015 that one of its regular sections was dubbed: "People who think that 'The Final Countdown' is the best song ever choose the best song ever in their opinion". In this program, a random fan of the show would come on air for a short interview about themselves and their relationship to the song, and then be asked what the best song ever in their opinion is - cueing "The Final Countdown" to be played in its entirety to seal the interview.

The song and the band Europe appeared in a 2015 USA television commercial for GEICO insurance, playing in a lunchroom as a microwave oven's timer is counting down toward zero seconds, saying if you're Europe, "you love a final countdown: it's what you do." That same year, "Sleazegrinder" of Louder included the song in his list of "The 20 Greatest Hair Metal Anthems Of All Time".

The song became the unofficial theme song for the Arrested Development television series character George Oscar "Gob" Bluth II, who used it as an opening to his magic act.

The song was featured in the teaser trailer for the fourth season of The Umbrella Academy.

=== Cover versions ===
"The Final Countdown" is a particular favourite of guitarist Ritchie Blackmore, who incorporated elements of it into "Gone with the Wind", his 1999 reimagining of Lev Knipper's "Polyushko-polye".

American husband-and-wife banjo players Béla Fleck and Abigail Washburn performed an interpretation of the song in May 2015 for The A.V. Club's A.V. Undercover series. Time magazine praised the cover as "really, really lovely."

== See also ==
- List of Dutch Top 40 number-one singles of 1986
- List of European number-one hits of 1986
- List of number-one hits of 1986 (Germany)
- List of number-one hits of 1986 (Italy)
- List of number-one singles and albums in Sweden
- List of number-one singles of 1986 (Ireland)
- List of number-one singles of 1986 (France)
- List of number-one singles of 1987 (Spain)
- List of number-one singles of the 1980s (Switzerland)
- List of UK Singles Chart number ones of the 1980s
