= Europe (band) =

Swedish rock band

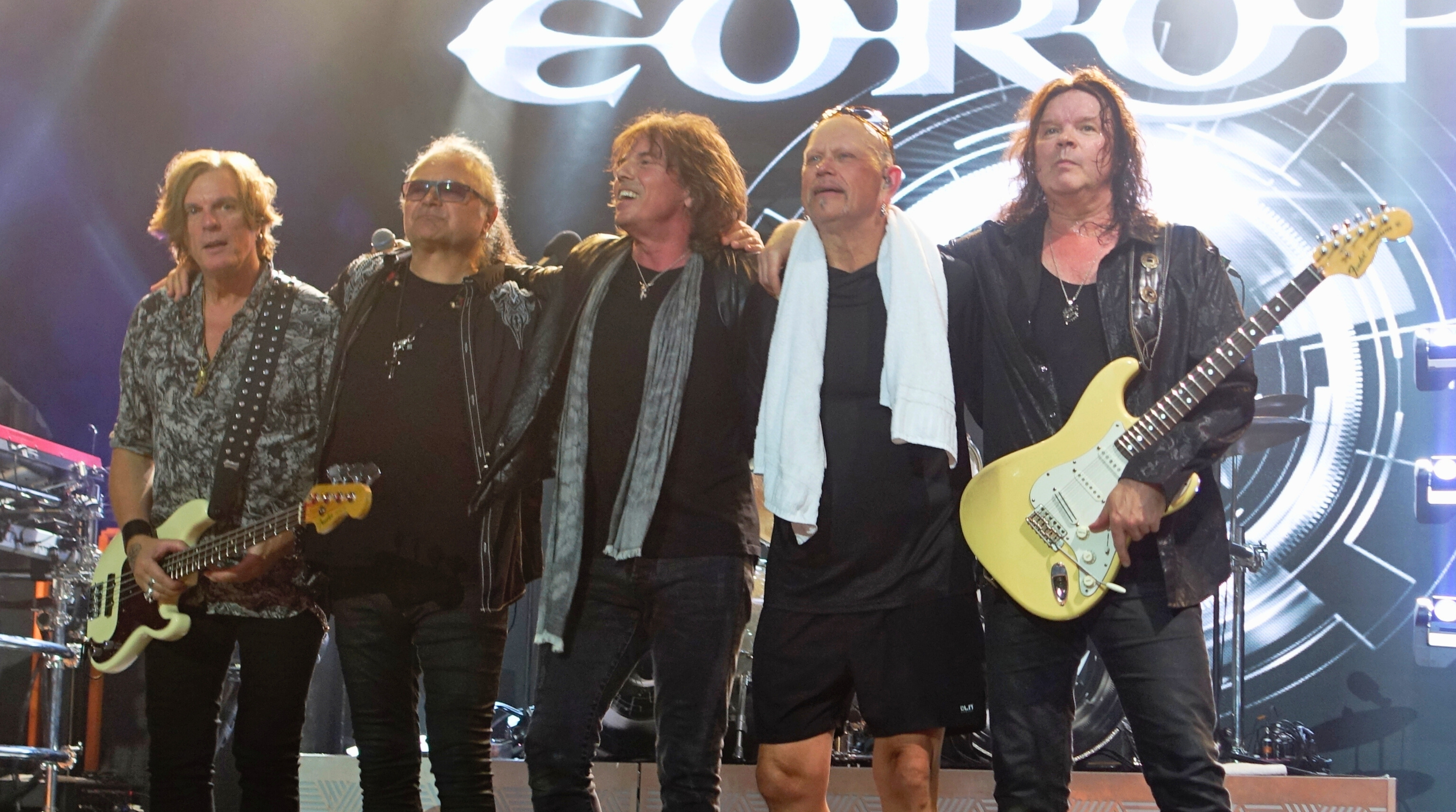
- Europe on stage in Tønsberg 2025. From left to right: John Levén, Mic Michaeli, Joey Tempest, Ian Haugland and John Norum.

Background information
- Also known as: Force (1979–1982)
- Origin: Upplands Väsby, Sweden
- Genres: Arena rock; hard rock; glam metal; blues rock; heavy metal
- Years active: 1979–1992; 1999; 2003–present
- Labels: Epic; Edel; Sanctuary; earMusic; UDR Records; Silver Lining Music / Hell & Back Recordings; Swedmetal Records
- Members: Joey Tempest; John Norum; John Levén; Mic Michaeli; Ian Haugland
- Past members: Peter Olsson; Tony Reno; Marcel Jacob; Kee Marcello
- Website: europetheband.com

Europe is a Swedish rock band formed in Upplands Väsby in 1979, by lead vocalist Joey Tempest, guitarist John Norum, bassist Peter Olsson, and drummer Tony Reno. Named after the continent itself, they obtained a major breakthrough in Sweden in 1982 by winning the televised competition Rock-SM (Swedish Rock Championships); it was the first time this competition was held.

Since their formation, Europe has released twelve studio albums, three live albums, three compilations and twenty-nine music videos. Europe's current lineup comprises Tempest, Norum, bassist John Levén, keyboardist Mic Michaeli, and drummer Ian Haugland.

Europe's first two albums, released in the early 1980s, performed moderately well, but only in their home country of Sweden. The group saw more international fame with the release of their third album, 1986's The Final Countdown. As of 2003, Europe had sold a total of 10 million albums worldwide. The band has had two top 20 albums on the US Billboard 200 chart (The Final Countdown and Out of This World) and two top 10 hits on the US Billboard Hot 100 chart; "The Final Countdown" (#8) and "Carrie" (#3). Another song, "Rock the Night", reached #30 on the US Hot 100.

Europe broke up in 1992, taking what was called an indefinite hiatus. However, the band reunited for a performance in Stockholm on New Year's Eve 1999. Four years later, in 2003, Europe announced an official reunion. Since then, the band has released seven albums: Start from the Dark (2004), Secret Society (2006), Last Look at Eden (2009), Bag of Bones (2012), War of Kings (2015), Walk the Earth (2017), and Come This Madness (2026).

== History ==
=== Europe and Wings of Tomorrow (1979–1984) ===
The first incarnation of the band was named Force and came together in 1979, in Upplands Väsby, Stockholm, and was integrated by vocalist Joey Tempest, guitarist John Norum, bass guitarist Peter Olsson, and drummer Tony Reno. "I remember when we started the band Force we were playing covers in the rehearsal room, because we just wanted to learn our instruments, like all bands," Tempest said, "Then one day I said maybe we should do our own stuff. Nobody had any ideas, so I brought mine into the rehearsal room, and that is when we started writing our own stuff."

The band sent several demos to record companies, but were told that in order to be published they had to cut their hair and sing in Swedish. Two years later, Olsson left the band and was replaced by John Levén. Levén later joined Yngwie Malmsteen's band Rising Force, while Malmsteen's former bassist Marcel Jacob joined Force. This only lasted for three months, though; Levén apparently had issues with Malmsteen, so he and Jacob traded places again.

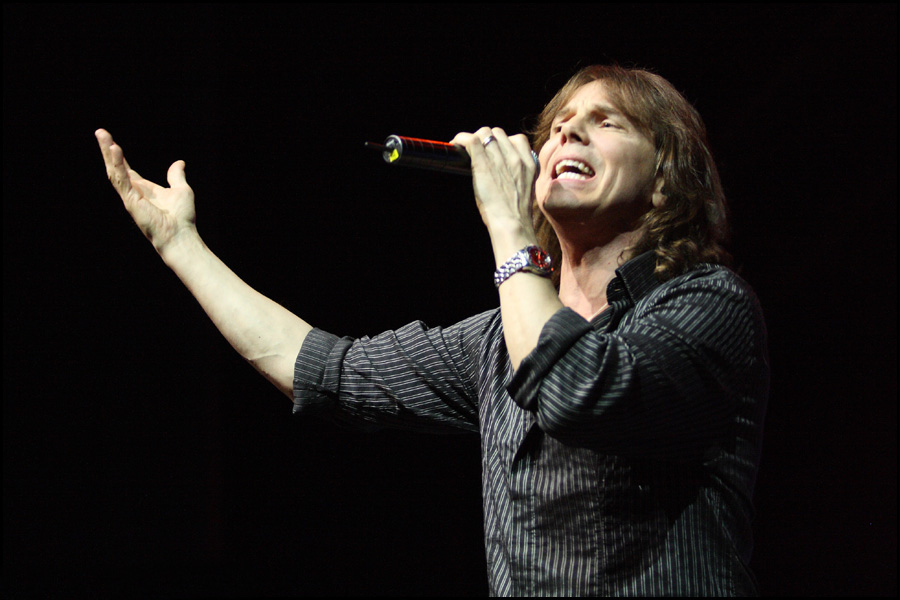
Singer Joey Tempest performing in 2010.

In 1982, Tempest's girlfriend entered Force in the Swedish rock talent contest Rock-SM. Competing against 4000 bands, they won the contest thanks to two songs, "In the Future to Come" and "The King Will Return". The reward was a record deal with Hot Records. Tempest won the individual award for Best Lead Singer, and Norum won the award for Best Guitarist. Just before the contest, Force changed their name to Europe. Tempest got the name from the Made in Europe album by Deep Purple.

The self-titled debut album was released the following year, and sold well both in Sweden and Japan. The album charted at number 8 in the band's home country and the single "Seven Doors Hotel" became a Top 10 hit in Japan.

The second album Wings of Tomorrow was released one year later. The album got interest from CBS Records who offered them an international contract in 1985. "I think one of the most important albums for the band was Wings of Tomorrow," Tempest said, "We were learning how to write songs and John started playing some really cool stuff on the guitar. We became a better band and that was a good period for the band." Keyboardist Mic Michaeli was soon recruited to play in live concerts, and became an official member of the band shortly after. At the same time, Tony Reno was fired because of his lack of motivation and alleged slacking off on rehearsals. His replacement was Ian Haugland.

=== The Final Countdown (1985–1987) ===
In 1985 Europe recorded the soundtrack for the film On the Loose, which gave them the hit "Rock the Night". Several months later, Joey Tempest was asked to write a song for the charity project Swedish Metal Aid. He wrote "Give a Helping Hand", which would feature the biggest stars of Swedish rock and metal. The income from the sales of the single, which was produced by Easy Action guitarist Kee Marcello, was donated to relief efforts for the famine in Ethiopia.

In September 1985, Europe was approached by an executive from Epic Records. They helped Europe start the recording of its next album with Journey producer Kevin Elson. The result was The Final Countdown. Released on 26 May 1986, the album gave the band its international breakthrough, was certified Triple Platinum in the USA and reached number 8 on the Billboard 200 chart. The title track, which was based on a keyboard riff composed by Tempest as early as 1981–82, was released as the first single and became a worldwide success, peaking at number 1 in 25 countries, such as the UK, France, Spain, and Germany. The hit "Rock the Night" was in the top 10 charts in European countries. The power ballad "Carrie" peaked at number 3 on the Billboard Hot 100 chart. "Cherokee" was the other single released.

Not satisfied with the album's keyboard-dominated production nor the band's commercialized image, John Norum decided to leave Europe in October 1986 to pursue a solo career. "I didn't really like the direction the band was going in," Norum said, "We became this teeny-bopper, bubblegum band and I hated that whole image, the spandex, poodle-rock type of thing. I was more into the heavier, guitar-oriented stuff and it seemed like the keyboards were taking over more and more, and we were becoming more commercial. So I decided to leave. I just wanted to move on and do something else."

Kee Marcello was asked to replace Norum, and after some consideration, he decided to join the band. Marcello joined the band at its commercial peak.

Three singles from The Final Countdown reached the US Top 30. The following year saw successful tours through Europe and the USA.

=== Out of This World and Prisoners in Paradise (1988–1992) ===
The follow-up to The Final Countdown was entitled Out of This World and was released in 1988. The biggest hit from the album was "Superstitious" which peaked at number 31 on the Billboard Hot 100 and number 9 on the Mainstream Rock Tracks. "Superstitious" would be the last Europe song to chart in the USA. The album was certified platinum in the States and peaked at number 19 on the Billboard 200 chart. More touring followed, including an American tour with Def Leppard and a festival gig at the National Bowl in Milton Keynes, England with Bon Jovi, Skid Row, and Vixen.

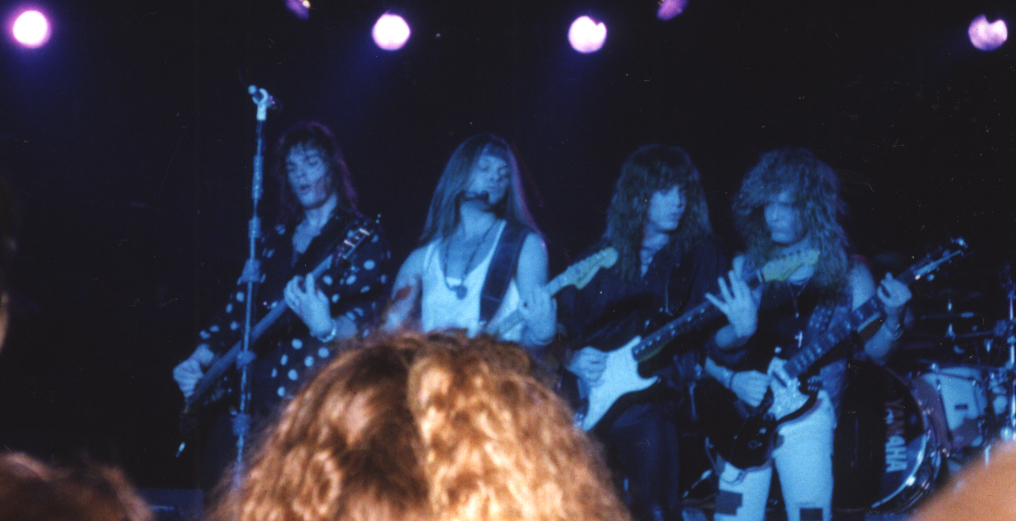
Europe in Hamburg, 1992

In September 1989, Europe did a gig at the Whisky a Go Go club in West Hollywood, California, under the pseudonym Le Baron Boys. That name would later be used as a title for a much-circulated Europe bootleg, which contained demo recordings from 1989 to 1990. Two years later, the album Prisoners in Paradise was released, but received limited media attention due to the "boom" of the grunge movement, started by Nirvana, Soundgarden, Alice In Chains and Pearl Jam. Although the sales were low compared to previous albums, the single "I'll Cry for You" managed to hit number 28 on the UK charts. On New Year's Eve 1991, Europe kicked off a new tour with a show at the Tokyo Dome, in which Tesla, Thunder and Metallica also performed. The show was called "Final Countdown '91".

After ten years of living, recording, and touring together, Europe decided to take a break at the end of the 1992 tour. "I remember in the tour bus afterwards we were talking about where the whole thing was going and I think at the time the consensus of the band was we really felt ready for a break," Tempest said, "We felt that it was time to put some roots down and I was really into the idea of making my own solo album." In that time, Tempest, Norum and Marcello released solo albums whilst the other members participated in several different projects and bands. In return, Europe was dropped from Epic Records.

=== Reunion and Start from the Dark (2003–2005) ===
The band members started to discuss the possibility of a Europe reunion in 1998. "Mic and Ian came over to see me in Ireland," Tempest said, "Then whilst we were there, John Norum called from LA, and we were like 'Yes, maybe now is the right time to get things started again'." For the 2000 millennium celebrations, Europe was asked to do a concert in Stockholm on New Year's Eve 1999. That would be Europe's first and, to date, only concert with both of their lead guitarists, since both John Norum and Kee Marcello had accepted the offer to play that evening with the rest of the group. They played "Rock the Night" and "The Final Countdown".

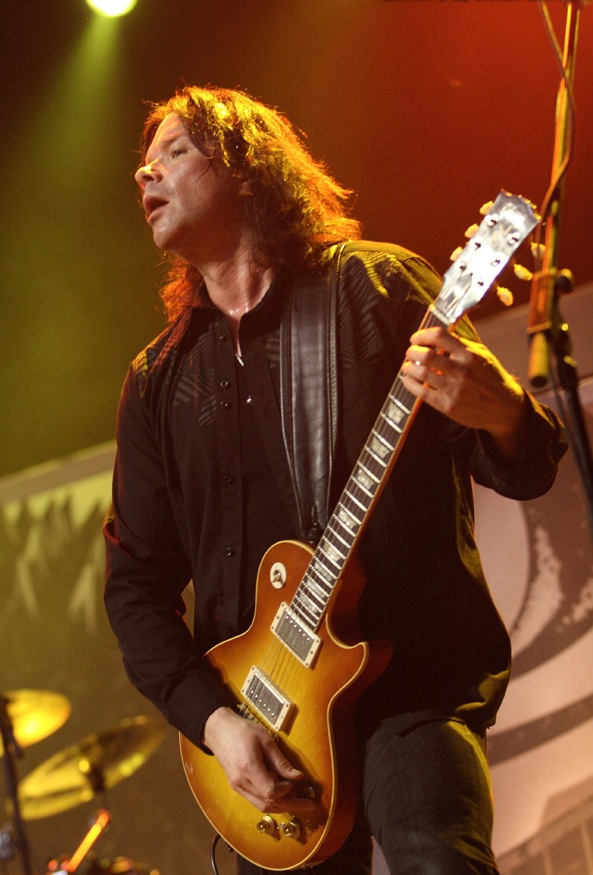
Guitarist John Norum performing in 2009.

Over the years, there were several reunion rumors, and on 2 October 2003 it was made official: Europe announced plans for a new album and world tour. The band then switched back to The Final Countdown line-up, with John Norum as the only lead guitarist. "There was no doubt that we wanted John back, and John wanted to get back," Tempest said, "For me it was important to get that spark going again that we had before." Kee Marcello claimed that he was too busy with his own projects. "I told them I didn't want to participate in a [new] studio album because musically, I want to go in a different kind of direction than the music Europe stands for," Marcello said, "Then we talked for a while about doing a six-piece tour – it didn't turn out that way because of different reasons."

The songwriting for a new album, Start from the Dark, began early in 2003. "It was just a matter of moving forward and writing songs for the new album," Tempest said, "That was always our intention. We thought that if we were gonna make a comeback, we wanted to do it properly, and that meant we wanted to write and record some new songs, a new album." For the recording of Start from the Dark, the band decided to work with producer Kevin Elson, who had also produced The Final Countdown. "We could either go with a younger producer, or we could go with someone that we knew, someone experienced who is on the same wavelength as the band," Tempest said, "So in the end we decided that Kevin would be the perfect choice."

In the summer of 2004, Europe went on a festival tour through the European continent. The concert setlists included the old hits, but also introduced the title track from Start from the Dark. The album was released on 22 September 2004, the same day that John Norum became a father. Start from the Dark featured a more modern sound compared to Europe's previous albums. "We wanted to be doing something at least that was a little bit relevant now; bit of a dry mix, detuned a bit," Tempest said, "So we felt like we didn't want to do an 1980s album per se, we just wanted to start like a fresh band really." Eventually, the album sold in excess of 600,000 copies worldwide.

=== Secret Society and Last Look at Eden (2006–2010) ===
Europe released its seventh album, Secret Society on 26 October 2006. "We think it's one of the strongest albums that Europe has ever done," Tempest said, "There is definitely some more melodic stuff on this one. Start from the Dark was very raw and made a statement, which is cool but for us it felt like a debut album in a way, so we wanted to branch out a bit on this one and take it to new levels."

On 26 January 2008, Europe did a semi-acoustic live concert at Nalen in Stockholm, calling the event Almost Unplugged. The band was accompanied by a string quartet and played reworked versions of its own songs, as well as cover versions of songs by bands that have influenced Europe's sound throughout the years – Pink Floyd, UFO, Led Zeppelin and Thin Lizzy. The show was broadcast live over the Internet on Europe's official website. It was released on CD on 17 September 2008 and on DVD on 19 August 2009.

On 23 July 2008, Europe did a co-headlining concert with Whitesnake in Padua, Italy. During Whitesnake's performance of their encore "Still of the Night", Joey Tempest joined David Coverdale on stage for the last chorus. In August 2008 Europe was the opening act for Deep Purple for two concerts in Sweden, in Linköping on 8 August and Ystad on 9 August. John Norum joined Deep Purple on stage in Ystad for a performance of "Smoke on the Water".

On 21 July 2009, bass guitarist and former member of Force, Marcel Jacob, committed suicide. He was 45 years old.

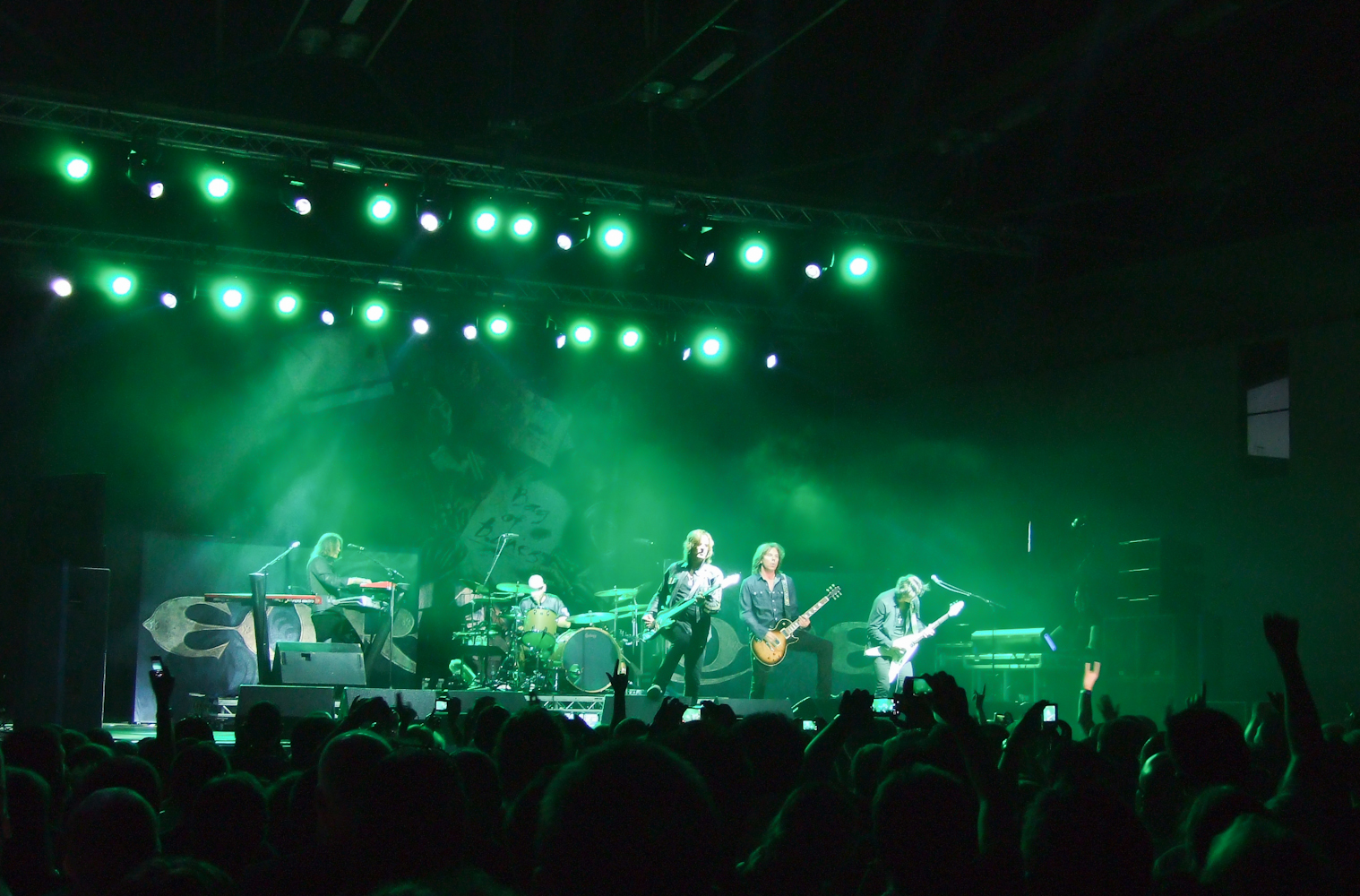
Europe performing in Festivalna hall, Sofia in 2012.

Europe's eighth studio album, Last Look at Eden, was released on 9 September 2009. The title track was released as a single in June. The band has described it as a modern retro rock album. "This time, we're taking some new directions with our songs, and we're exploring different styles," they stated, "There is a definite classic rock vibe on some of the tracks... a tip of the hat to groovin', funkin' 1970s rock songs - but ones we have bought into the here and now." The second single, "New Love in Town", was released as a digital download on 3 September 2009.

=== Bag of Bones and War of Kings (2011–2016) ===
On 6 August 2011, Europe headlined the closing ceremonies of the 22nd World Scout Jamboree in Rinkaby, Sweden before an audience of 40,061 Scouts and Guides which included King Carl XVI Gustaf of Sweden and Queen Silvia of Sweden.

On 12 July 2011, Europe confirmed that Kevin Shirley would produce their ninth studio album. The recording sessions started on 3 October 2011. On 24 January 2012 the band announced the album title, Bag of Bones. The album was released on 18 April 2012 in Japan by Victor Entertainment and on 25 April in Sweden by Gain Music Entertainment. "Bag of Bones" debuted at number 2 on the Swedish album chart on 4 May 2012 and was certified Gold in Sweden on 12 July 2012.

The band played at the Sweden Rock Festival in 2013, with their performance recorded for a 30th anniversary double CD, DVD and Blu-ray Disc, which was released in October 2013.

In 2014, Europe celebrated the 30th anniversary of their second studio album Wings of Tomorrow. They performed the entire Wings of Tomorrow album on several shows, including in Sweden.

Europe's tenth studio album, War of Kings was released on 2 March 2015 by UDR Records. It was produced by Dave Cobb, producer for bands such as Rival Sons. This was followed in March 2015 by a 14-date tour of the UK co-headlining with Black Star Riders, supported by the Amorettes.

Europe participated in a major cable television GEICO advertising campaign which started airing September 2015 in the US; in a television commercial, they are featured singing "The Final Countdown" to the background of an office break room, as a microwave oven cooks a burrito.

Europe released the War of Kings Special Edition together with Live Performance from Wacken Open Air Festival which was performed on 29 July 2015. The digital version was released on 27 November 2015 by UDR Records and the Blu-ray & DVD version released in early 2016.

In November 2016, Europe announced the 30th Final Countdown Anniversary Tour to celebrate the 30th anniversary of their top selling album "The Final Countdown". In this tour, they performed the entire "The Final Countdown" album and the entire "War Of Kings" album in every concert. They also filmed the concert performed in Roundhouse, London on 12 November 2016 and released it on 21 July 2017 via Blu-ray, DVD & iTunes Digital Download.

=== Walk the Earth and Come This Madness (2017–present) ===
In mid-2017, Europe announced their eleventh studio album, titled Walk the Earth. The album was released on 20 October via CD with bonus DVD and digital download.

In 2023 they announced their 40th anniversary tour titled Time Capsule, with dates in Europe across eight countries. The tour started on 30 September 2023 in Lausanne, Switzerland, and ended on 26 October 2023 in London, England.

On 28 April 2026, the band announced their twelfth studio album, Come This Madness, which was released on 25 September. They also released the lead single from the album, "One on One".

== Musical style and influences ==
Europe's music has been described as arena rock, hard rock, glam metal, blues rock and heavy metal. The band is mainly influenced by Whitesnake, Deep Purple, Rainbow, Led Zeppelin, Thin Lizzy, UFO and Michael Schenker Group.

== Band members ==
Current

- Joey Tempest – lead vocals, rhythm guitar (1979–1992, 1999, since 2003), keyboards, piano (1979–1984, occasionally since 1984)
- John Norum – lead guitar, backing vocals (1979–1986, 1999, since 2003)
- John Levén – bass, backing vocals (1981–1992, 1999, since 2003)
- Mic Michaeli – keyboards, piano, keytar, backing vocals, occasional guitars (1984–1992, 1999, since 2003)
- Ian Haugland – drums, percussion, snare drum, backing vocals (1984–1992, 1999, since 2003)

Former

- Tony Reno – drums, percussion (1979–1984)
- Peter Olsson – bass, backing vocals (1979–1981)
- Marcel Jacob – bass, backing vocals (1981, died 2009)
- Kee Marcello – lead guitar, backing vocals (1986–1992, 1999)

== Discography ==
Studio albums

- Europe (1983)
- Wings of Tomorrow (1984)
- The Final Countdown (1986)
- Out of This World (1988)
- Prisoners in Paradise (1991)
- Start from the Dark (2004)
- Secret Society (2006)
- Last Look at Eden (2009)
- Bag of Bones (2012)
- War of Kings (2015)
- Walk the Earth (2017)
- Come This Madness (2026)

== Accolades ==
=== Awards and nominations ===
Year	Nominee / work	Award associations		Result	Ref.
Year	Nominee / work	Award ceremony / media	Category	Result	Ref.
1986	Themselves	Rockbjörnen (Sweden)	Best Swedish Group	Won	
1986	Themselves	Gold Bravo Otto (Germany)	Hard 'n Heavy	Won	
1987	Themselves	Gold Bravo Otto (Germany)	Hard 'n Heavy	Won	
1988	Themselves	Gold Bravo Otto (Germany)	Hard 'n Heavy	Won	
1989	Themselves	Silver Bravo Otto (Germany)	Bands Hard 'n Heavy	Won	
1990	Themselves	Bronze Bravo Otto (Germany)	Bands Hard 'n Heavy	Won	
2015	Themselves	Rockbjörnen (Sweden)	Best Hard Rock/Metal	Won	
2015	Themselves	Classic Rock Roll of Honour (UK)	Comeback of the Year	Won	
2018	Walk the Earth	Grammis (Sweden)	Best Hard Rock/Metal	Won	

Year	Award	Result	Ref.
1987	Pan European Awards 1986 (Music & Media)	Won	

Year	Award	Nominee / work	Result	Ref.
2022	YouTube Billion Views Award	"The Final Countdown"	Won	

=== Other honors ===
Year	Award	Result	Ref.
2018	Swedish Music Hall of Fame	Inducted	

== See also ==
- List of glam metal bands and artists
- Culture of Europe
