= John Levén =

Swedish bassist

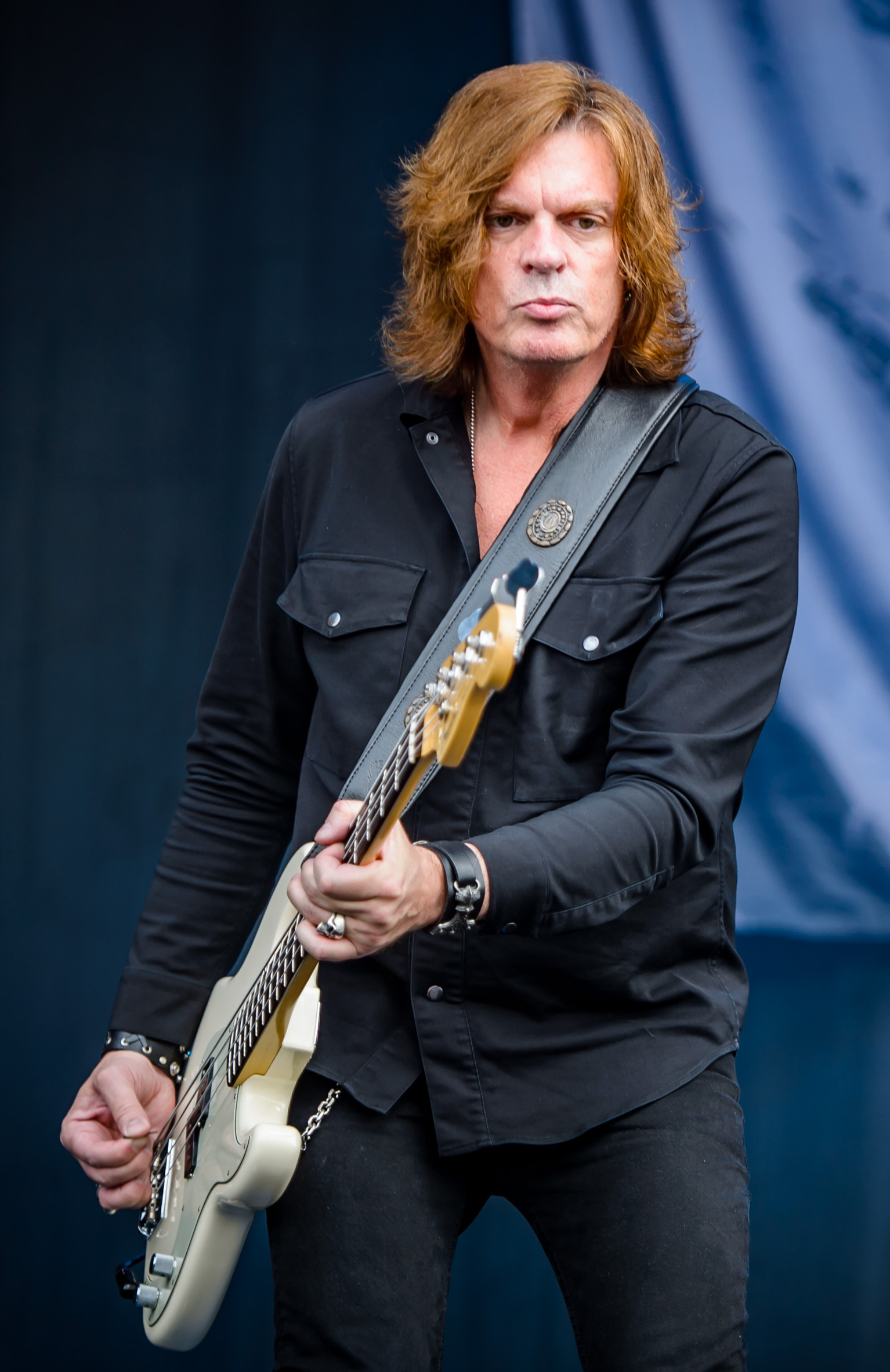
- Levén at Wacken Open Air 2017

Background information
- Born: John Gunnar Levén; 25 October 1963 (age 62); Stockholm, Sweden
- Genres: Hard rock, heavy metal, glam metal
- Occupation: Bassist
- Years active: 1981–present

John Gunnar Levén (born 25 October 1963) is a Swedish bassist in the rock band Europe. Levén and vocalist Joey Tempest are the only band members who have performed on all of Europe's studio albums.

== Career ==
Levén was born in Stockholm. When he was seven years old, he and his family moved to the suburb Upplands Väsby, where several members of Europe grew up. He joined the band in 1981, replacing Peter Olsson. In 1985 Levén was the one who suggested that Tempest should write a song based on an old keyboard riff that the vocalist had written around 1981–82. The result was the song "The Final Countdown".

After Europe went on hiatus in 1992, Levén recorded and toured with bands like Brazen Abbot, Clockwise, Last Autumn's Dream, Southpaw, Europe colleague John Norum and former Black Sabbath / Deep Purple vocalist Glenn Hughes.

Europe reunited in 2003, and Levén co-wrote the single "Always the Pretenders" from the 2006 album Secret Society, with Tempest. He also co-wrote the song "The Beast" on the 2009 album Last Look at Eden.

== Personal life ==
Levén has three sons, Daniel, Alex and Adrian.

== Discography ==
=== Europe ===
- Europe (1983)
- Wings of Tomorrow (1984)
- The Final Countdown (1986)
- Out of This World (1988)
- Prisoners in Paradise (1991)
- Start from the Dark (2004)
- Secret Society (2006)
- Last Look at Eden (2009)
- Bag of Bones (2012)
- War of Kings (2015)
- Walk the Earth (2017)
- Come This Madness (2026)

=== Other artists ===
- Glenn Hughes - From Now On... (1994)
- Glenn Hughes - Burning Japan Live (1994)
- Thin Lizzy Tribute - The Lizzy Songs (1995)
- Johansson Brothers - Sonic Winter (1996)
- Brazen Abbot - Eye of the Storm (1996)
- Clockwise - Nostalgia (1996)
- Brazen Abbot - Bad Religion (1997)
- Clockwise - Naïve (1998)
- Southpaw - Southpaw (1998)
- Thore Skogman - Än Är Det Drag (1998)
- Nikolo Kotzev - Nikolo Kotzev's Nostradamus (2001)
- Brazen Abbot - Guilty as Sin (2003)
- Last Autumn's Dream - Last Autumn's Dream (2003)
- Jayce Landberg - Good Sleepless Night (2010)
- Crowne - Kings in the North (2021)
