= Mic Michaeli =

Swedish keyboardist

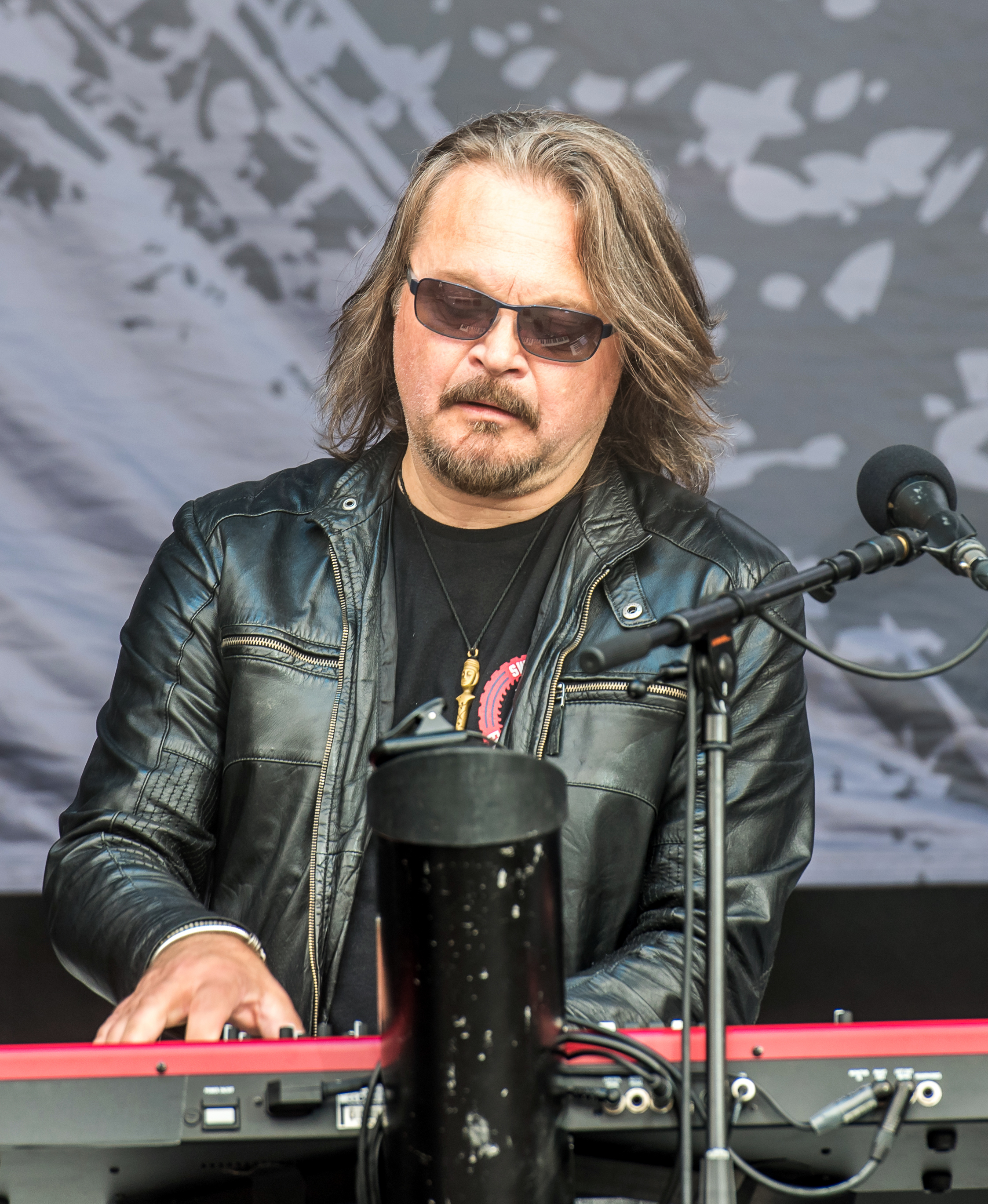
- Michaeli in 2017

Background information
- Born: Gunnar Mathias Michaeli; 11 November 1962 (age 63); Upplands Väsby, Stockholm, Sweden
- Genres: Heavy metal, hard rock, glam metal
- Occupation: Keyboardist
- Instruments: Synthesizers; keyboards; vocals
- Years active: 1978–present
- Spouse: Mia Hertler (m. 1989; div. 2001)

Gunnar Mathias Michaeli (born 11 November 1962) is a Swedish musician best known as the keyboardist for the rock band Europe. Like many of the other Europe members he grew up in Stockholm suburb Upplands Väsby. He joined the band for their Wings of Tomorrow tour in 1984, taking vocalist Joey Tempest's place behind the keyboards.

== Career ==
Michaeli has co-written several Europe songs; his most famous song is the hit ballad "Carrie" from the album The Final Countdown. The song was co-written by Michaeli and Tempest and was Europe's biggest hit in the U.S., reaching number 3 on the Billboard Hot 100 chart.

After Europe went on hiatus in 1992, Michaeli recorded and toured with bands like Brazen Abbot, Last Autumn's Dream and former Black Sabbath / Deep Purple vocalist Glenn Hughes. He also co-wrote three songs on Joey Tempest's third solo album, Joey Tempest, which was released in 2002.

== Gear ==
Michaeli has used various instruments during his career, including a Roland JX-8P, Yamaha SY99, Korg CX-3 and a Hammond C3. Today he is using a Roland Fantom X7, Nord Lead 3 and a Nord Stage.

== Personal life ==
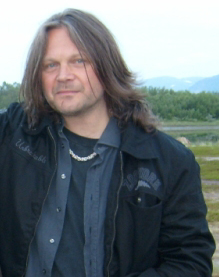
Michaeli in 2008

In 1989, Michaeli married Mia Hertler. They divorced in 2001 after 12 years of marriage.

Michaeli is currently living in Stockholm. He has three children, Marcus, Moa and Matilda. He does not have any social media pages apart from the official ones for Europe listed on their website.

== Discography ==
=== Europe ===
- The Final Countdown (1986)
- Out of This World (1988)
- Prisoners in Paradise (1991)
- Start from the Dark (2004)
- Secret Society (2006)
- Last Look at Eden (2009)
- Bag of Bones (2012)
- War of Kings (2015)
- Walk the Earth (2017)
- Come This Madness (2026)

=== Other artists ===
- Tone Norum – One of a Kind (1986)
- Glenn Hughes – From Now On... (1994)
- Glenn Hughes – Burning Japan Live (1994)
- Brazen Abbot – Live and Learn (1995)
- Brazen Abbot – Eye of the Storm (1996)
- Brains Beat Beauty – First Came Moses, Now This... (1997)
- Brazen Abbot – Bad Religion (1997)
- Thore Skogman – Än Är Det Drag (1998)
- Nikolo Kotzev – Nikolo Kotzev's Nostradamus (2001)
- Brazen Abbot – Guilty as Sin (2003)
- Last Autumn's Dream – Last Autumn's Dream (2003)
- Bosses Vänner – Läget? (2007)
- John Norum – Play Yard Blues (2010)
