= Ian Haugland =

Swedish drummer

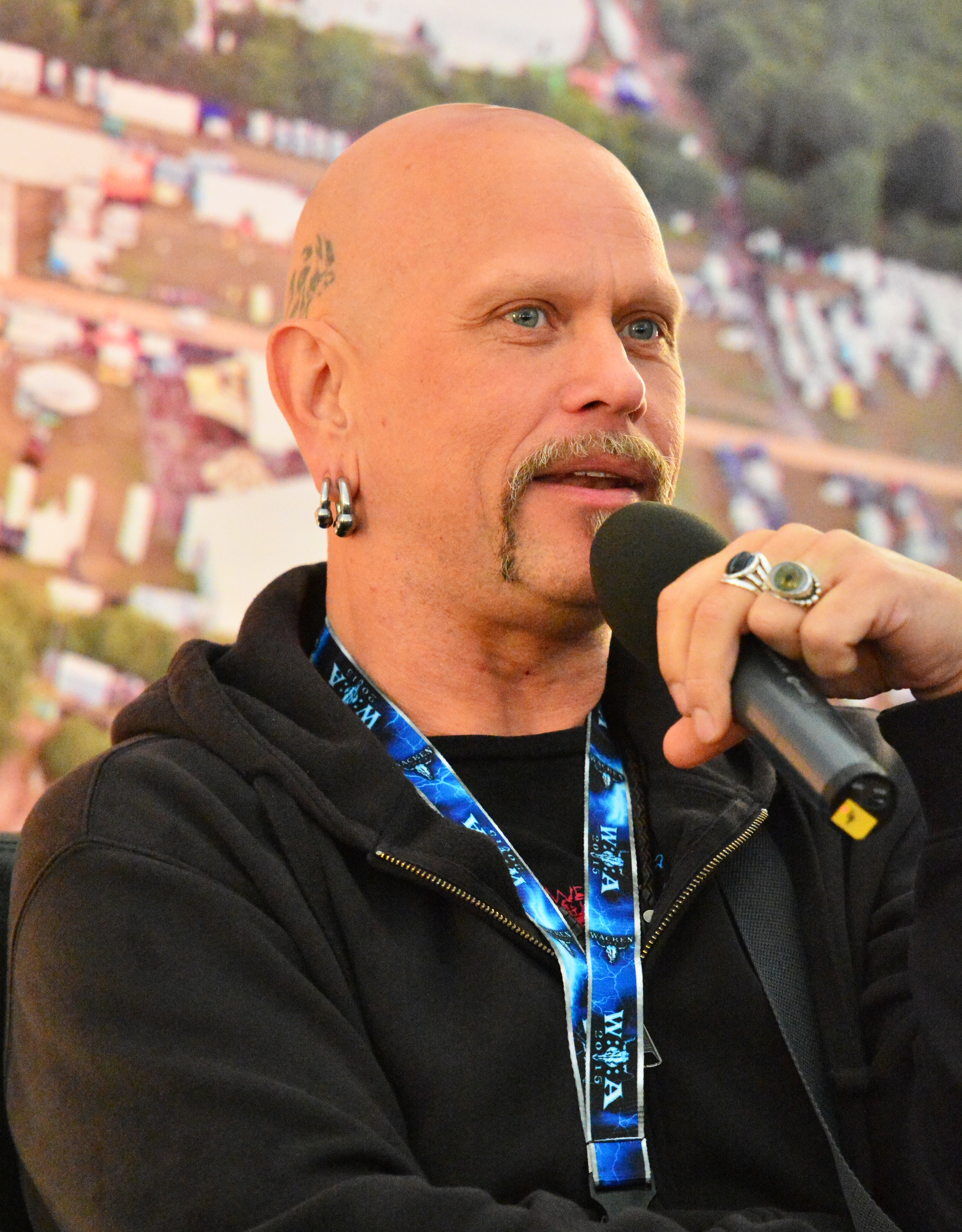
- Haugland in 2015

Background information
- Born: Jan-Håkan Haugland; 13 August 1964 (age 62); Storslett, Norway
- Genres: Heavy metal, hard rock, glam metal
- Occupation: Drummer
- Years active: 1981–present
- Spouse: Marita Isaksen (m. 1989, divorced) Marie Nilsson (m. 2017)

Jan-Håkan "Ian" Haugland (born 13 August 1964) is a Norwegian-Swedish drummer in the Swedish rock band Europe. When he was eight months old, he and his family moved to the Stockholm suburb of Märsta, Sweden. He joined Europe in the summer of 1984, replacing Tony Reno. Previously Haugland had played in a number of bands, including Trilogy, where Candlemass bassist Leif Edling sang, and Yngwie J. Malmsteen's band Rising Force.

After Europe went on hiatus in 1992, Haugland recorded and toured with bands like Brazen Abbot, Clockwise, Last Autumn's Dream, Europe colleague John Norum and former Black Sabbath / Deep Purple vocalist Glenn Hughes. In 1998 Haugland recorded a cover version of the Black Sabbath song "Changes", for the Ozzy Osbourne tribute album Ozzified. When he's not on the road or in the studio, he works as a host on the radio channel 106.7 FM Rockklassiker in Sweden and occasionally plays drums in the studio.

== Discography ==
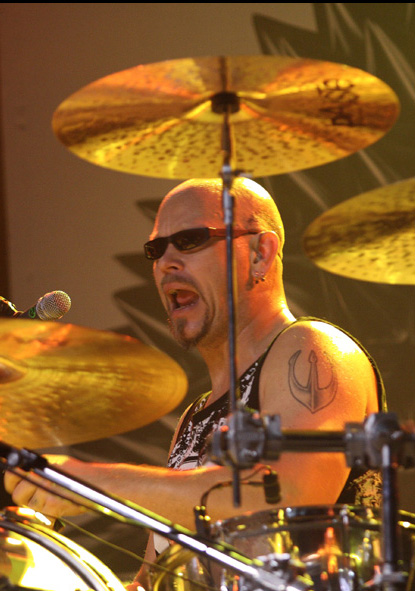
Haugland performing in 2009

=== Europe ===
- The Final Countdown (1986)
- Out of This World (1988)
- Prisoners in Paradise (1991)
- Start from the Dark (2004)
- Secret Society (2006)
- Last Look at Eden (2009)
- Bag of Bones (2012)
- War of Kings (2015)
- Walk the Earth (2017)
- Come This Madness (2026)

=== Other artists ===
- Tone Norum – One of a Kind (1986)
- Baltimoore – Thought for Food (1994)
- Trilogy – Lust Provider (1994)
- Niva – No Capitulation (1994)
- Glenn Hughes – From Now On... (1994)
- Glenn Hughes – Burning Japan Live (1994)
- R.A.W. - First (1995)
- Brazen Abbot – Live and Learn (1995)
- Peter Jezewski – Swedish Gold (1996)
- Brazen Abbot – Eye of the Storm (1996)
- Clockwise – Nostalgia (1996)
- R.A.W. - Now We're Cookin' (1997)
- Brazen Abbot – Bad Religion (1997)
- Brains Beat Beauty – First Came Moses, Now This... (1997)
- Clockwise – Naïve (1998)
- Ozzy Osbourne Tribute – Ozzified (1998)
- Thore Skogman – Än Är Det Drag (1998)
- Candlemass – Dactylis Glomerata (1998)
- Totte Wallin – M M M Blues (och lite country) (1998)
- Nikolo Kotzev – Nikolo Kotzev's Nostradamus (2001)
- Baltimoore – The Best of Baltimoore (2001)
- Sha-Boom – FIIIRE!! - The Best of Sha-Boom ( 2002)
- Brazen Abbot – Guilty as Sin (2003)
- Last Autumn's Dream – Last Autumn's Dream (2003)
