= Sweden Rock Festival =

Music festival in Blekinge, Sweden

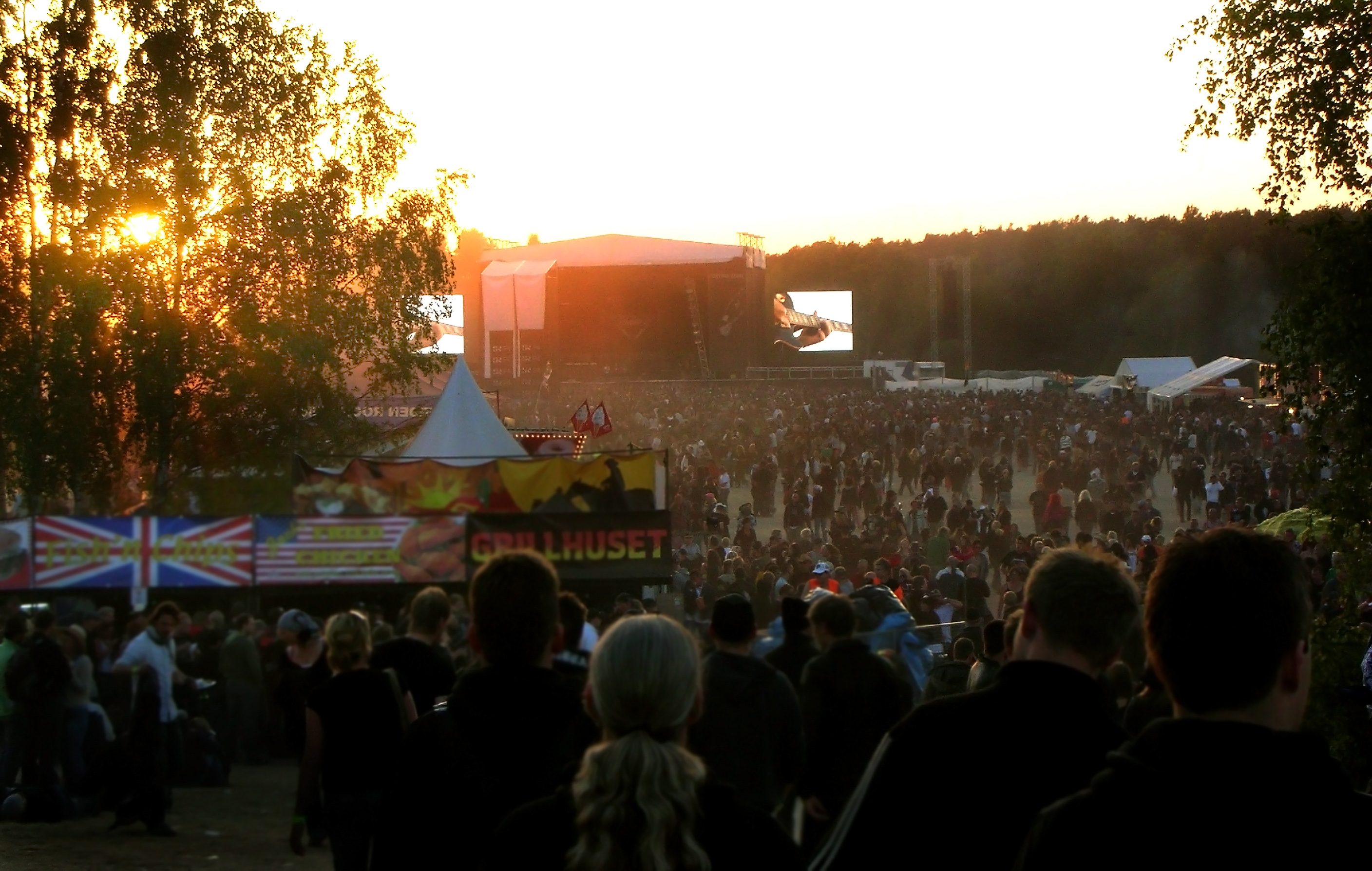
- Final evening of Sweden Rock 2008
- Genre: Heavy metal, hard rock, blues rock
- Dates: June
- Locations: Norje, Sölvesborg, Sweden
- Years active: 1992–present
- Website: swedenrock.com

Sweden Rock Festival is a rock festival outside the town of Sölvesborg in Blekinge in southern Sweden. The festival offers a mix of classic rock, hard rock, metal, blues and related genres.

The first version of the festival, known as Sommarfestivalen i Olofström, was held in Olofström in 1992. In 1993 the festival moved to Karlshamn, and changed its name to Karlshamn Rock Festival. In 1998, the festival moved to Norje, although the name Karlshamn Rock Festival was kept. In 1999 the name was changed to Sweden Rock Festival.

When the festival began in 1992, it featured nine relatively unknown bands and only lasted one day. The next year the festival was expanded to two days and more bands were added to the line-up. From 1993 to 2002 the festival would last two days; over those years it would also begin to feature bigger name acts. In 2000 the festival was expanded to three days but it returned to two days the following year.

From 2003 to 2006 the festival lasted three days and had by then featured some of the biggest acts. From 2007 the festival has been expanded to four days and will feature approximately 100 different bands/artists.

Some notable appearances in the past have been Aerosmith, Iron Maiden, Judas Priest, Mötley Crüe, Dio, Bruce Dickinson, Yngwie Malmsteen, Twisted Sister, Whitesnake, Uriah Heep, Europe, Deep Purple, Accept, Motörhead, Saxon, Nazareth, Poison, Status Quo, Lynyrd Skynyrd, Scorpions, Porcupine Tree, Kamelot, Def Leppard, Alice Cooper, Testament, W.A.S.P, ZZ Top, The Orchestra, Thin Lizzy, Ted Nugent, Slayer, Ghost and Guns N' Roses.

The festival has also worked as a comeback scene for bands like Triumph and Thundersteel line-up Riot.

Bachman & Turner started their world reunion tour here in June 2010. In 2013 both Rush and Kiss together with Europe were headliners for the festival.

The festival was acquired by Live Nation Entertainment in 2016.

The COVID-19 pandemic caused the festival to be cancelled in 2020 and 2021.

== Lineups ==
=== 2025 ===
4-7 June, Norje Havsbad
- 802
- Abbath
- Adrian Vandenberg
- Alien
- Apocalyptica
- Aviana
- Battering Ram
- Black Country Communion
- Blind Guardian
- Bloodstain
- Bombus
- Bror Gunnar Jansson & Nameless Fear
- Brothers of Metal
- Cattle Decapitation
- Crimson Glory
- Crucified Barbara
- D-A-D
- Dark Tranquillity
- Donnatellus
- Danko Jones
- Doro
- Dragonfire
- Dream Theater
- Eagles of Death Metal
- Exodus
- Fredlös
- The Ghost Inside
- The Good The Bad and the Zugly
- Goodnight Greatness
- Guenna
- Hardline
- The Headlines
- Huggorm
- Jinjer
- Joddla med Siv
- King Diamond
- Knogjärn
- Korn
- Kreator
- L.A. Guns (canceled)
- The Mercury Riots
- Meshuggah
- Metalite
- The Mind Palace
- Myles Kennedy
- Myrkur
- Nephila
- The Night Flight Orchestra
- Nothing More
- Old Man's Child
- Opeth
- Orbit Culture
- Pretty Maids
- Remedy
- Royal Republic
- Running Wild
- Sabaton
- Sabïre
- Samantha Fish
- Sarcator
- Scorpions
- Sex Pistols featuring Frank Carter
- Signs of the Swarm
- Skillet
- Slipknot
- Slomosa
- Soen
- Stryper
- Transport League
- Tryin' Within
- Turbonegro
- Unfound Reliance
- Vola
- The Warning
- Wind Rose
- Within Temptation

=== 2024 ===
5-8 June, Norje Havsbad
- Alice Cooper
- Avantasia
- Avatarium
- The Baboon Show
- Battle Beast
- Beast in Black
- Biohazard
- The Black Crowes
- Black Stone Cherry
- Bruce Dickinson
- Bullet
- Canned Heat
- Carcass
- Care of Night
- Chainsaw Holiday
- Cirith Ungol
- The Cruel Intentions
- Crypta
- The Dahmers
- Dampf
- The Darkness
- Decapitated
- Dewolff
- Dimmu Borgir
- Dismember
- Dream Evil
- The Drippers
- Ebba Bergkvist & the Flat Tire Band
- Electric Boys
- Electric Callboy
- Eternal Evil
- Evanescence
- Extreme
- F.K.Ü.
- Five Finger Death Punch
- Gaupa
- The Gems
- Gloryhammer
- Graveyard
- Hammerfall
- The Haunted
- Heavy Load
- Hellgroove
- High on Fire
- The Hives
- Hulkoff
- Humanity's Last Breath
- Ice Nine Kills
- Igorrr
- Imminence
- Iron Savior
- Journey
- Judas Priest
- Kebnekajse
- Kerry King
- Lillasyster
- Lucifer
- Megadeth
- Michael Schenker Group
- Mystic Prophecy
- Nazghor
- Nestor
- Orden
- Ogan
- Pain
- Parkway Drive
- Primal Fear
- Prins Svart
- Rexoria
- Richie Kotzen
- Riot V
- Rival Sons
- Riverside
- Rockklassiker Allstars
- Satyricon
- Scarlet
- Skraeckoedlan
- Slaughter to Prevail
- The Southern River Band
- Spiders
- Steel Panther
- Svarta Sanningar
- Swedish Erotica Talisman - a Tribute to Marcel Jacob
- Thy Art is Murder
- Treat
- Truckfighters
- Tyketto
- Týr
- Velveteen Queen
- Vicious Rumors
- Vltimas
- W.A.S.P.
- We Are to Blame
- Winger
- Xion
- Zeal & Ardor

=== 2023 ===
7–10 June, Norje Havsbad
- 1349
- Abramis Brama
- Airbourne
- Alter Bridge
- Angra
- Avatar
- Behemoth
- Billy Gibbons and the BFGS
- Bloodbound
- Blue Öyster Cult
- Blues Pills
- British Lion
- Brutus
- Children of the Sün
- Christone Kingfish Ingram
- Clutch
- Coney Hatch
- Crowne
- The Crown
- Dahlia
- Deathstars
- Deep Purple
- Def Leppard
- Defleshed
- Dynazty
- Employed to Serve
- Enforcer
- Eradikated
- Europe
- Florence Black
- Lita Ford
- Ghost
- Gojira
- Grave
- Green Lung
- Grimner
- H.E.A.T
- Hot Breath
- Iron Maiden
- Jinjer
- Joddla med Siv
- Kamelot
- Chez Kane
- Karmanjakah
- Katatonia
- Korpiklaani
- Liar Thief Bandit
- Mammoth WVH
- Marduk
- Mindless Sinner
- Modesty
- Monster Magnet
- Mötley Crüe
- Motvind
- Myrath
- Nakkeknaekker
- Napalm Death
- Die Oberherren
- The Overthrone
- Pantera
- Perfect Plan
- Phil Campbell and The Bastard Sons
- Powerwolf
- Raised Fist
- Rancid
- The Raven Age
- Rockklassiker Allstars
- Running Cooper
- Sanctrum
- Sator
- Self Deception
- Skid Row
- Skynd
- Smash Into Pieces
- Soilwork
- Spidergawd
- Spiritbox
- Ström
- Symphony X
- Testament
- Thorbjörn Risager and the Black Tornado
- Threshold
- Thundermother
- TNT
- Mike Tramp - Songs of White Lion
- Tribulation
- Tungsten
- Twilight Force
- U.D.O.
- Vended
- Wig Wam
- Wolfmother

=== 2022 ===
8–11 June, Norje Havsbad
- 10cc
- Lee Aaron
- Accept
- Agonize the Serpent
- Alestorm
- Amaranthe
- Art Nation
- Artillery
- Baest
- Jean Beauvoir
- Belphegor
- Bomber (Note: Was not confirmed for SRF 2021)
- Bombus
- Browsing Collection
- Clawfinger
- The Coffinshakers
- Rosalie Cunningham
- D-A-D
- Death by Horse
- Dirty Money
- Dropkick Murphys
- Eclipse
- Elden
- Eleine
- Eluveitie
- Evergrey
- Fejd
- Freedom Call
- Eric Gales
- Grave
- Guns N' Roses
- The Halo Effect
- Hardcore Superstar
- The Hellacopters
- Hexed
- Honeyburst
- Honeymoon Suite
- Horndal
- Hällas
- In Flames
- Kadavar
- Kingdom Come
- Kvelertak
- Magic Pie
- Mass Worship
- Megadeth
- Mercyful Fate
- Metalite
- Michael Monroe
- Månegarm
- Narnia
- Nashville Pussy
- Nationalteatern
- Nestor
- Night Ranger
- Nightwish
- Nile (band)
- Opeth
- Orange Goblin
- Orbit Culture
- Orphaned Land
- Overdrive
- Praying Mantis
- Rage
- Raubtier
- Rockklassiker Allstars
- Ross the Boss
- Saga
- Satan Takes a Holiday
- Saxon
- Siena Root
- Social Distortion
- Sodom
- Sonata Arctica
- Sorcerer
- Ten Years After
- Tiamat
- Walter Trout
- Devin Townsend
- Trouble
- VA Rocks
- Victory
- Violator
- Volbeat
- Warner E Hodges Band
- The Wildhearts
- Witchcraft
- Within Temptation
- Wormwood

=== 2021 ===
9–12 June, Norje Havsbad (Canceled due to the COVID-19 pandemic)
- 10cc
- Lee Aaron
- Accept
- Agonize the Serpent
- Alestorm
- Amaranthe
- Art Nation
- Artillery (Note: Was not confirmed for SRF 2020)
- Baest
- Baroness (Note: Was not re-confirmed for SRF 2022)
- Jean Beauvoir
- Belphegor
- Bombus
- Browsing Collection
- Clawfinger
- The Coffinshakers
- Rosalie Cunningham
- D-A-D
- Death by Horse
- Dropkick Murphys
- Eclipse
- Elden
- Eleine
- Eluveitie
- Evergrey
- Fejd
- Freedom Call
- Eric Gales
- Gojira
- Grave
- Guns N' Roses
- Haken
- The Hellacopters
- Hexed
- Honeyburst
- Honeymoon Suite
- Horisont
- In Flames
- Kadavar
- Kingdom Come
- Kvelertak
- Magic Pie
- Mass Worship
- Megadeth
- Mercyful Fate
- Metalite
- Michael Monroe
- Månegarm
- Narnia
- Nashville Pussy
- Night Ranger
- Nightwish
- Nile (band)
- Opeth
- Orange Goblin
- Orphaned Land
- Overdrive
- Praying Mantis
- Rage
- Raubtier
- Ross the Boss
- Saga
- Satan Takes a Holiday
- Siena Root
- Social Distortion
- Sodom
- Sonata Arctica
- Sorcerer
- Ten Years After
- Tiamat
- Devin Townsend
- Trouble
- Turbonegro
- Unleash the Archers
- VA Rocks
- Victory
- Violator
- Volbeat
- Walter E Hodges Band
- The Wildhearts
- Witchcraft
- Within Temptation
- Wormwood

=== 2020 ===
3–6 June, Norje Havsbad (Canceled due to the COVID-19 pandemic)
- 10cc
- Lee Aaron
- Accept
- Agonize the Serpent
- Alestorm
- Amaranthe
- Art Nation
- Jean Beauvoir
- Baest
- Baroness
- Belphegor
- Black Star Riders (Note: Was not re-confirmed for SRF 2021)
- Blue Öyster Cult
- Bombus
- Browsing Collection
- Clawfinger
- The Coffinshakers
- Rosalie Cunningham
- D-A-D
- Death by Horse
- Eclipse
- Elden
- Eluveitie
- Evergrey
- Fejd
- Freedom Call
- Eric Gales
- Gojira
- Grave
- Guns N' Roses
- Haken
- Harem Scarem
- The Hellacopters
- Hexed
- Honeyburst
- Horisont
- In Flames
- Kadavar
- Kingdom Come
- Kvelertak
- Magic Pie
- Mass Worship
- Mercyful Fate
- Metalite
- Michael Monroe
- Månegarm
- Narnia
- Nashville Pussy
- Nightwish
- Nile (band)
- Opeth
- Orange Goblin
- Orphaned Land
- Overdrive
- Praying Mantis
- Rage
- Raubtier
- Saga
- Satan Takes a Holiday
- Siena Root
- Social Distortion
- Sonata Arctica
- Sorcerer
- Stryper
- Devin Townsend
- Trouble
- Walter Trout
- Turbonegro
- Unleash the Archers
- Violator
- VA Rocks
- Victory
- Volbeat
- Walter E Hodges Band
- The Wildhearts
- Witchcraft
- Within Temptation
- Wormwood

=== 2019 ===
5–8 June, Norje Havsbad
- ACT
- Amon Amarth
- Annihilator (cancelled, replaced by Unleashed)
- Arch Enemy
- At the Gates
- Bataar
- Batushka
- Blaze Bayley
- Beast in Black
- Behemoth (cancelled, replaced by Myrath)
- Blackberry Smoke
- Black Mamba
- Blue Coupe
- The Bones
- Brothers of Metal
- Burning Witches
- Candlemass
- Zal Cleminson's Sin Dogs
- Cobra Cult
- Danko Jones
- Darkane
- Deadland Ritual
- Death Angel
- Def Leppard
- Demon
- Demons & Wizards
- Disturbed
- Dizzy Mizz Lizzy
- Dream Theater
- Dust Bowl Jokies
- Dynazty
- Easy Action
- Electric Boys
- Electric Hydra
- FM
- Gathering of Kings
- The Generations Army
- Gorgoroth
- Gravestone
- Green Jellÿ
- Hällas
- HammerFall
- James Holkworth and the Coolbenders
- In Silence
- Jag Panzer
- KISS
- Krisiun
- Krokus
- Lillasyster
- LOK
- Lucifer
- Lisa Lystam Family Band
- Magnum
- Myrath
- Jared James Nichols
- The Night Flight Orchestra
- Oz
- Axel Rudi Pell
- Powerwolf
- The Quill
- Rainbow
- Rock på svenska: en hyllning till strängen
- Uli Jon Roth
- Royal Republic
- Saxon
- Scarlet
- Seventh Wonder
- Sins in Vain
- Sir Reg
- Skid Row
- Slayer
- Styx
- Tenacious D
- Three Days Grace
- Thundermother
- Joe Lynn Turner
- UFO
- Hank von Hell
- Pete Way Band
- The Wild
- Witchfynde
- ZZ Top

=== 2018 ===
6–9 June, Norje Havsbad
- 99Plajo
- The 69 Eyes
- Astral Doors
- Avatarium
- Backyard Babies
- Baroness
- Battle Beast
- Body Count
- Buckcherry
- Buckets Rebel Heart
- Bullet
- Circus Maximus
- The Mick Clarke Band
- Coldtears
- Coven
- Crashdïet
- Crazy Lixx
- CyHra
- The Dark Element
- Dark Funeral
- The Darkness
- Dark Tranquility
- Destruction
- Doc Holliday
- Brian Downey's Alive and Dangerous
- Electric Mary (Canceled)
- F.K.Ü
- Focus
- Frontback
- Gain Eleven
- Gaupa
- Girlschool
- Graveyard
- Hackensack (Canceled)
- Hardcore Superstar
- H.E.A.T.
- Hedda Hatar
- Heavy Load
- Helloween
- Glenn Hughes
- In This Moment
- Inglorious
- Iron Maiden
- Shooter Jennings (Canceled)
- Judas Priest
- Junkyard Drive
- Killswitch Engage
- Kreator
- Lacuna Coil
- Lugnet
- Madam X
- Meshuggah
- Misery Loves Co.
- Nala
- Nazareth
- Nekrokraft
- The New Roses
- Nocturnal Rites
- Ozzy Osbourne
- PAIN
- Pestilence
- Pist.On
- Pop Evil (Canceled)
- Pretty Maids
- Primordial
- The Quill
- The Quireboys
- The Raven Age
- Rockklassiker Allstars
- Rose Tattoo
- Rotting Christ
- Skindred
- Sky high
- Slade
- Spiral Skies
- Steelheart
- Stone Sour
- Stratovarius
- Suffocation
- Tarja
- Three Dead Fingers
- Torch
- Bernie Tormé
- Turbonegro
- Joe Lynn Turner (Canceled)
- Uriah Heep
- Vixen
- Wilmer X
- Yes Featuring Jon Anderson, Trevor Rabin, Rick Wakeman

=== 2017 ===
7–10 June, Norje Havsbad
- Aerosmith
- Alter Bridge
- Amorphis
- Apocalyptica
- Artch
- Art Nation
- Black Ingvars
- Black Star Riders
- The Brandos
- Phil Campbell & The Bastard Sons
- Candlemass
- Carcass
- Clutch
- Coheed and Cambria
- Stacie Collins
- Corroded
- Dare (Replaced Kansas)
- The Dead Daisies
- Dead Sleep
- Edguy
- Electric Boys
- Fates Warning
- Gotthard
- Grand Magus
- Grave Digger
- Great King Rat
- Hardline
- The Haunted
- Heavy Tiger
- Helix (Replaced Y&T)
- Ian Hunter & The Rant Band
- Iced Earth
- In Flames
- King's X
- Kix
- Knogjärn
- Leading Light
- Lionheart
- Little Steven and the Disciples of Soul
- Lost Society
- Lucifer's Friend
- Merciless
- Metal Church
- Ministry
- Motvind
- Mustasch
- Myrkur
- Nifelheim
- Nocean
- Picture
- Primal Fear
- Primus
- RATT
- Rhapsody
- Rival Sons
- Rockklassiker All-Stars
- Running Wild
- Sator
- Saxon
- Scorpions
- Skeleton Birth
- Steel Panther
- Supralunar
- Svartanatt
- Sweden Rock Symphony Orchestra
- Thunder
- Thyrfing
- Rob Tognoni
- Treat
- A Tribute to Led Zeppelin
- The Unguided
- Emma Varg
- VA Rocks
- Venom
- Veonity
- Voivod
- Warlock
- Bob Wayne & The Outlaw Carnies
- Wintersun
- Wishbone Ash

=== 2016 ===
8–11 June, Norje Havsbad
- 220 Volt
- Amaranthe
- Anthrax
- Avantasia
- Dan Baird and Homemade Sin
- Banditos
- The Eric Bell Trio
- Blind Guardian
- Bonafide
- Graham Bonnet
- Death DTA
- Demon (replaced Robin George & Dangerous Music)
- Diamond Head
- Dirkschneider
- Eclipse
- Eleine
- Entombed AD
- Epica
- Finntroll
- Lita Ford
- Foreigner
- Friday Night Specials
- Gamma Ray
- Grand Slam
- Graveyard
- Gun
- Halestorm
- Hawkwind
- The Hellacopters
- The Hooters
- Glenn Hughes
- Imperial State Electric
- The Kentucky Headhunters
- King Albatross
- King Diamond
- King Kobra
- King Witch
- The Kristet Utseende
- L.A. Guns
- Legion of the Damned
- Lordi
- Loudness
- Mayhem
- Megadeth
- Monster Truck
- My Dying Bride
- Neon Rose
- Niterain
- Painted Sky
- Pedalens Pagar
- The Presolar Sands
- Queen + Adam Lambert
- Raised Fist
- Dan Reed Network
- Rockklassiker All-Stars
- Sabaton
- Saffire
- Eric Sardinas And Big Motor
- Satyricon
- Michael Schenker Fest (With Gary Barden, Robin Mcauley and Graham Bonnet)
- Serpent
- Shinedown
- Sixx A.M.
- Skallbank
- Skitarg
- Slayer
- Slough Feg
- Soilwork
- The Struts
- Symphony X
- The Temperance Movement
- Therapy?
- Mike Tramp
- Tribulation
- Twilight Force
- Twisted Sister
- Uncle Acid & the Deadbeats
- Steve Vai
- Vanilla Fudge
- Warner Drive
- The Winery Dogs

=== 2015 ===
3–6 June, Norje Havsbad
- Abramis Brama
- Airbourne
- Alestorm
- All That Remains
- The Angels
- Avatar
- Backyard Babies
- Battle Beast
- Behemoth
- Scott H. Biram
- Blackberry Smoke
- Bloodbath
- Browsing Collection
- Tony Carey
- Children of Bodom
- D-A-D
- Dare
- The Darkness
- Dark Tranquillity
- Deception
- Def Leppard
- Delain
- Dokken
- Egonaut
- Electric Mary
- Eluveitie
- Jon English
- Evergrey
- Exciter
- Exodus
- Extreme
- Fish – Farewell to Childhood
- Five Finger Death Punch
- Frantic Amber
- Ace Frehley
- Ghost
- Gloryhammer
- Gojira
- Grave Pleasures
- Steve Grimmett's Grim Reaper
- HammerFall
- Hardcore Superstar
- Hatebreed
- HAZY/DIZZY
- H.E.A.T
- Hell
- Dan Hylander & Orkester
- Jerusalem
- Judas Priest
- Kaipa Da Capo
- Kee Man Hawk
- Lillasyster
- Lucifer's Friend
- Mad Max
- Maida Vale
- Manfred Mann's Earth Band
- Marduk
- Meshuggah
- M.O.B.
- Molly Hatchet
- Michael Monroe
- Morbus Chron
- Mother's Finest
- Mötley Crüe
- Mustasch
- My Dying Bride (cancelled)
- Nuclear Assault
- Opeth
- The Order of Israfel
- Carl Palmer's ELP Legacy
- Portrait
- The Quireboys
- Rage (as Refuge)
- Riot V
- Rock Goddess
- Royal Ruckus
- Safemode
- Samael
- Seventribe
- The Sirens
- Slash feat. Myles Kennedy & The Conspirators
- Spike's Free House
- Steve 'N' Seagulls
- Torsson
- Toto
- Pat Travers
- Wasted Shells
- Wolf
- Yardstones

=== 2014 ===
4–7 June, Norje Havsbad
- Alter Bridge
- Ammotrack
- Annihilator
- Arch Enemy
- Asphyx
- Avatarium
- Robin Beck
- Black Sabbath
- Black Trip
- Blues Pills
- Bombus
- Canned Heat
- Cloven Hoof
- Alice Cooper
- Crowbar
- The Crystal Caravan
- Dark Angel
- Death SS
- Paul Di'Anno vs Blaze Bayley
- Dust Bowl Jokies
- Electric Banana Band
- Emperor
- Five Horse Johnson
- Flotsam and Jetsam
- Freak Kitchen
- Heaven's Basement
- Horisont
- Jaguar
- Kamelot featuring Alissa White-Gluz and Elize Ryd
- Kings of the Sun
- Kvelertak
- Magnum
- Masterplan
- Eddie Meduza Lever
- Megadeth (cancelled)
- The Men They Couldn't Hang
- Monster Magnet
- The Night Flight Orchestra
- Ted Nugent
- Phenomena (cancelled)
- Powerwolf
- Pretty Maids
- Q5
- The Rainmakers
- Red Dragon Cartel
- The Rods
- Royal Republic
- Saga
- Sodom
- Sólstafir
- Sparzanza
- Talisman
- Therion
- Thundermother
- TNT
- Transatlantic
- Turisas
- Uriah Heep
- Volbeat
- W.A.S.P.
- Within Temptation
- Y&T
- Rob Zombie

=== 2013 ===
5–8 June, Norje Havsbad
- Accept
- Amaranthe
- Amon Amarth
- Asia
- At the Gates
- Avantasia
- Axxis
- Backdraft
- The Black Day
- Black Star Riders
- Bloodbound
- Nicke Borg Homeland
- Bullet
- Candlemass
- Civil War
- Stacie Collins
- Corroded
- Crazy Lixx
- Days of Jupiter
- The Dead and Living
- Demon
- Doro
- The Drake Equation
- Jon English
- Europe
- Firewind
- Five Finger Death Punch
- Goda Grannar
- Hardline
- Heathen
- Audrey Horne
- Huntress
- Hypocrisy
- Ihsahn
- Imber
- Jaggernaut
- Michael Katon
- Kiss
- Klogr
- Mia Klose
- Kreator
- Krokus
- The Last Band
- Leningrad Cowboys
- Leprous
- The Levellers (band)
- Magic Pie
- Manilla Road
- Mårran
- Masters of Reality
- Morgana Lefay
- Naglfar
- Newsted
- Nine Below Zero
- Overworld
- Paradise Lost
- Martin Prahl's Skelter Wheels
- The Quireboys
- Raubtier
- Regal Demise
- Rockklassiker All-Stars
- Pugh Rogefeldt
- Rush
- Sahg
- Satan
- Saxon
- The Scams
- Sister Sin
- Skid Row
- Sonata Arctica
- Spiders
- Rick Springfield
- Status Quo
- Survivor
- Sweet
- System Annihilated
- Tankard
- Threshold
- Thunder
- Devin Townsend Project
- Treat
- UFO
- Vader
- Vomitory

=== 2012 ===
8–11 June, Norje Havsbad
- 10cc
- Adrenaline Mob
- Sebastian Bach
- Bad Company
- Blue Öyster Cult
- Cannibal Corpse
- Danko Jones
- The Darkness
- Dimmu Borgir
- Edguy
- Electric Boys
- Entombed
- Exciter
- Exodus
- Fear Factory
- Fish
- The Flower Kings
- Gamma Ray
- Girlschool
- Gotthard
- Katatonia
- Killing Floor
- King Diamond
- Lynyrd Skynyrd
- Mastodon
- Mötley Crüe
- Motörhead
- Nationalteatern
- Night Ranger
- Axel Rudi Pell
- Rival Sons
- Sabaton
- Michael Schenker's Temple of Rock
- Sepultura
- Skyforger
- Slade
- Slaughter
- Soundgarden
- Steel Panther
- Symphony X
- Twisted Sister
- Ugly Kid Joe

=== 2011 ===
8–11 June, Norje Havsbad
- Lee Aaron
- Agent Steel
- Black Label Society
- Black Veil Brides
- Crashdïet
- The Cult
- The Damned
- Destruction
- Electric Wizard
- Fläsket Brinner
- FM
- Ghost
- The Groundhogs
- Hardcore Superstar
- The Haunted
- Hawkwind
- Helloween
- The Hooters
- Jason & the Scorchers
- Joan Jett & the Blackhearts
- Judas Priest
- Kansas
- Moonspell
- Mr. Big
- Mustasch
- Ozzy Osbourne
- Overkill
- Rage (acoustic set)
- Raubtier
- Dan Reed Band
- Rhapsody of Fire
- Rhino Bucket
- Mason Ruffner
- Saxon
- Spock's Beard
- Steelheart
- Stryper
- Styx
- Walter Trout
- Tygers of Pan Tang
- Whitesnake
- Rob Zombie

=== 2010 ===
9–12 June, Norje Havsbad
- Aerosmith
- Alestorm
- Anvil
- Bachman & Turner
- Behemoth
- Bigelf
- Blackberry Smoke
- Cinderella
- D-A-D
- Danzig
- Guns N' Roses
- Billy Idol
- Jorn
- Magnum
- Michael Monroe
- Gary Moore
- Mother's Finest
- Mustasch
- Nazareth
- Aldo Nova (cancelled)
- Pretty Maids
- Ratt (cancelled)
- Raven
- Dan Reed
- Sabaton
- Saga
- Slayer
- Stone Sour
- Rick Springfield
- Stratovarius
- Unisonic
- W.A.S.P.
- Watain
- Winger
- Y&T

=== 2009 ===
3–6 June, Norje Havsbad
- Affecti Veternus
- Amberian Dawn
- Amon Amarth
- Axident Avenue
- Dan Baird
- Blaze Bayley
- Blackfoot
- Black Tooth
- Bullet
- Candlemass
- Chains
- The Chair
- Crucified Barbara
- Deathstars
- Demon
- Dream Theater
- Electric Boys
- Enforcer
- Europe
- Flogging Molly
- Forbidden
- Lita Ford
- Foreigner
- Grand Magus
- Ground Mower
- HammerFall
- H.E.A.T
- Heaven & Hell
- Helstar
- Hysterica
- Immortal
- Impellitteri
- In Flames
- Journey
- Kamelot
- Keld
- Lujuria
- Marillion
- Neal Morse
- Motörhead
- Jon Oliva's Pain
- Outlaws
- Over The Rainbow
- Ripper Owens
- Pain
- Pilgrimz
- Rage
- Riot
- Eric Sardinas
- Sevendust
- Seventh Wonder
- Soilwork
- Stormzone
- Tank
- Thor
- Torch
- Tracenine
- The Tubes
- Twisted Sister
- Tyketto
- UFO
- Unleashed
- Uriah Heep
- Vains Of Jenna
- Voivod
- Volbeat
- Johnny Winter Band
- ZZ Top

=== 2008 ===
4–7 June, Norje Havsbad
- 45 Degree Woman
- Ammotrack
- Apocalyptica
- April Divine
- Archer
- Astral Doors
- At the Gates
- Avantasia
- Avatar
- Axewitch
- Sebastian Bach (cancelled)
- Birth Control
- Black Stone Cherry
- Blue Öyster Cult
- The Blues Band
- Boil
- Bonafide
- Carcass
- The Citadel
- Coheed & Cambria
- Corroded
- Dampungarna
- Dare
- Def Leppard
- Rick Derringer
- Disturbed
- Eläkeläiset
- Faith
- Fastway
- Five Fifteen
- Ace Frehley
- Glyder
- Gotthard
- Graveyard
- Hanoi Rocks
- Happy Pill
- Havana Black
- H.E.A.T.
- Ken Hensley/John Lawton & Live Fire
- Judas Priest
- Korpiklaani
- Lizzy Borden
- Ministry
- Mucc
- Mustasch
- Negative
- Omar & the Howlers
- The Orchestra
- Pain Of Salvation
- Picture
- Poison
- The Poodles
- Primal Fear
- Primordial
- Ratt
- Uli Jon Roth (cancelled)
- Royal Hunt
- Sabaton
- Joe Satriani
- Satyricon
- Saxon
- Shakin' Street
- Sister Sin
- Sonic Syndicate
- Stormwarrior
- Svölk
- Sweet Savage
- Tesla
- Testament
- Triumph
- Vivian
- Volbeat
- Whitesnake

=== 2007 ===
6–9 June, Norje Havsbad
- Aerosmith
- After Forever
- All Ends
- Amon Amarth
- Anekdoten
- Annihilator
- The Answer
- Australian Pink Floyd Show
- Black Oak Arkansas
- Blind Guardian
- Bloodbound
- Circus Maximus
- Crashdïet
- Dimmu Borgir
- Eldritch
- Falconer
- Fastway
- Focus
- Gov't Mule
- Hardcore Superstar
- Heaven and Hell
- Iced Earth
- Korpiklaani
- Kreator
- Krux
- Lion's Share
- Marduk
- McQueen
- Meat Loaf
- Memfis
- Motörhead
- Mozkovitch
- Nocturnal Rites
- November
- Axel Rudi Pell
- Randy Piper's Animal
- Point Blank
- Pretty Maids
- Suzi Quatro
- Quiet Riot
- REO Speedwagon
- Scorpions with Uli Jon Roth
- Skid Row
- Symphony X
- Thin Lizzy
- Thunder
- Tiamat
- Tokyo Dragons
- Trouble
- TWDSO
- Týr
- U.D.O.
- Vomitory
- Wolf

=== 2006 ===
8–10 June, Norje Havsbad
- Anvil
- Arch Enemy
- Baldroom Blitz
- Blitzkrieg
- Bonfire
- Bullet
- Cactus
- Cathedral
- Celtic Frost
- Cloudscape
- Alice Cooper
- Crucified Barbara
- Deep Purple
- Def Leppard
- Doro
- DragonForce
- Easy Action
- Edguy
- Emerald Monkey
- Entombed
- Evergrey
- Extrema
- Firewind
- From Behind
- Gamma Ray
- Gehennah
- Goda Grannar
- Gotthard
- Grave
- Hardcore Superstar
- Jeff Healey Band
- House of Shakira
- Jaded Heart
- Journey
- Kamelot
- Krokus
- Leaf Hound
- Lord Belial
- Metal Church
- Molly Hatchet
- Nasty Idols
- Nevermore
- Ted Nugent
- Obituary
- Onslaught
- Overdrive
- The Playboys
- The Poodles
- Porcupine Tree
- Queensrÿche
- The Quill
- Raise Hell
- Michael Schenker Group
- The Sensational Alex Harvey Band
- Sleazy Joe
- Sodom
- The Storyteller
- Sweet
- George Thorogood & The Destroyers
- Tigertailz
- Treat
- Neil Turbin's Deathriders
- Vanden Plas
- Venom
- Victory
- W.A.S.P.
- Whitesnake
- ZOMBINATOR

=== 2005 ===
9–11 June, Norje Havsbad
- Accept
- ACT
- Anthrax
- Sebastian Bach
- Behemoth
- Blackfoot
- Black Label Society
- Candlemass
- Crucified Barbara
- Crystal Eyes
- Defleshed
- Diamond Head
- Dio
- Dream Theater
- Face Down
- Force Of Evil
- Freak Kitchen
- Gemini5
- Goda Grannar
- Sammy Hagar and The Wabos
- HammerFall
- Helix
- Hellfueled
- Jug McKenzie
- Kansas
- Lana Lane
- The Lizards
- Magnum
- Yngwie Malmsteen
- Megadeth
- Kim Mitchell
- Morgana Lefay
- Mötley Crüe
- Motörhead
- Mustasch
- Napalm Death
- Nazareth
- Nightingale
- Overkill
- Pagan's Mind
- The Ring
- Rob Rock
- Sabaton
- Satanic Slaughter
- Savoy Brown
- Saxon
- Shakra
- Sonata Arctica
- Statetrooper
- Status Quo
- Styx
- Symphorce
- Ten 67
- Therion
- Thyrfing
- Trettioåriga Kriget (Thirty Year War)
- Robin Trower
- Vixen
- We
- Within Temptation

=== 2004 ===
10–12 June, Norje Havsbad
- Abramis Brama
- April Wine
- Astral Doors
- Beseech
- Brainstorm
- Carnal Forge
- Children of Bodom
- Coney Hatch
- Crazy Led of Mika Järvinen
- D-A-D
- Danger Danger
- Debase
- Dr. Feelgood
- Eddie Meduza Tribute
- Entombed
- Europe (Festival Headliners)
- Exodus
- Foghat
- Grand Magus
- The Haunted
- Hawkwind
- Heart
- Helloween
- Hirax
- In Flames
- Judas Priest
- Kingdom Come
- Lake of Tears
- Lost Horizon
- Lumsk
- Magic Slim & The Teardrops
- Maryslim
- Memory Garden
- Monster Magnet
- Montrose
- Narnia
- Nicky Moore plays Samson
- Nifelheim
- Nightwish
- Opeth
- Paragon
- Pathos
- Axel Rudi Pell
- Persuader
- Pink Cream 69
- Raceway
- Ritual
- Scorpions
- Slade
- Spearfish
- Spridda SkurarS
- Sun Caged
- TNT
- Testament
- Trading Fate
- Pat Travers Band
- U.D.O.
- UFO
- Wasa Express
- Y&T

=== 2003 ===
6–8 June, Norje Havsbad
- ACT
- Angra
- Anthrax
- Arch Nemesis
- Axenstar
- Blind Guardian
- Budgie
- Burning Point
- Chrome Shift
- Crystal Eyes
- Danko Jones
- Darkane
- Demon
- Paul Di'Anno & Killers
- DragonForce
- Dumper
- Fairyland
- Falconer
- Finntroll
- Ignition
- Jethro Tull
- Kamelot
- Krokus
- Locomotive Breath with Nicky Moore
- Masterplan
- Mörk Gryning
- Motörhead
- Pagan's Mind
- Peer Günt
- Platitude
- The Provenance
- Queensrÿche
- Sepultura
- Sky High
- Slow Train with Nicky Moore
- Sonata Arctica
- Spearfish with Svenne Hedlund
- Squealer
- Stormwind
- The Storyteller
- Syron Vanes
- Tad Morose
- Talisman
- Tankard
- Rob Tognoni
- Turning Leaf
- Twinball
- Twisted Sister
- Uriah Heep
- Whitesnake
- Wishbone Ash
- Y&T
- Yes

=== 2002 ===
7–8 June, Norje Havsbad
- 220 Volt
- Aurora
- Candlemass
- Cryonic Temple
- Damned Nation
- Destiny
- Bruce Dickinson
- Doc Holliday
- Doro
- Dream Evil
- Evergrey
- Five Fifteen
- Freak Kitchen
- Freedom Call
- Freternia
- Gamma Ray
- Girlschool
- Goda Grannar
- Halford
- Hanoi Rocks
- Michael Katon
- John Kay & Steppenwolf
- Lizard
- Locomotive Breath
- Lost Horizon
- Magnum
- Manfred Mann's Earth Band
- Meldrum
- Motörhead
- Ted Nugent
- Rage
- Reclusion
- Saxon
- Slowgate
- Snakegod
- Status Quo
- Steel Attack
- Virgin Steele
- Wolf

=== 2001 ===
8–9 June, Norje Havsbad
- AC/DC Jam
- Angel
- Bigelf
- Bosse
- Manny Charlton Band
- Dokken
- Elsesphere
- The Flower Kings
- Freak Kitchen
- Goda Grannar
- Grave Digger
- HammerFall
- Helloween
- Hensley/Lawton Band
- House of Shakira
- Glenn Hughes
- Lion's Share
- Lotus
- Metalium
- Gary Moore
- Moxy
- Mustasch
- Nitzinger
- Nocturnal Rites
- Pretty Maids
- Rise and Shine
- Rose Tattoo
- Uli Jon Roth
- Dee Snider
- Southern Rock Allstars
- Symphony X
- Talisman
- Tang
- U.D.O.
- W.A.S.P.

=== 2000 ===
9–11 June, Norje Havsbad
- Armored Saint
- Bai Bang
- Bigelf
- Alice Cooper
- Dash Rip Rock
- Demon
- Dio
- Edguy
- Evergrey
- Fivefifteen
- Freak Kitchen
- Goda Grannar
- Dave Hole
- In Flames
- King Diamond
- King's X
- Lynyrd Skynyrd
- Yngwie Malmsteen
- Frank Marino & Mahogany Rush
- The Midnight Blues
- Molly Hatchet
- John Norum Group + Brian Robertson
- Primal Fear
- Running Wild
- Saxon
- Stratovarius
- Street Legal
- Union

=== 1999 ===
11–12 June, Norje Havsbad
- Budgie
- Canned Heat
- Captain Beyond
- Dare
- Deep Purple
- Dio
- Entombed
- Freak Kitchen
- Gamma Ray
- HammerFall
- Dave Hole
- LA Doors
- Lion's Share
- LOK
- Lotus + special guest Brian Robertson
- Manowar
- Mercyful Fate feat. King Diamond
- Michael Schenker Group
- Motörhead
- The Quill
- David Lee Roth
- Scorpions
- U.D.O.

=== 1998 ===
5–6 June, Norje Havsbad
- Alice Cooper
- Backyard Babies
- Black Ingvars
- Blue Öyster Cult
- Clawfinger
- Creedence Clearwater Revisited
- D-A-D
- Dash Rip Rock
- Freak Kitchen
- Goda Grannar
- HammerFall
- Håkan Hemlin
- Hjalle & Heavy
- Johnny Lang
- Locomotive Breath
- Motörhead
- Mountain
- John Norum
- Peps Down Home Blues Band
- Push
- Simple Minds
- Dee Snider
- Sobsister
- Speaker
- Spiritual Beggars
- Status Quo
- Stratovarius
- Andrew Strong

=== 1997 ===
13–14 June, Karlshamn
- Alfheims
- The Blues Band
- Chris Jagger Zydeco Band
- Cross Eyed Mary
- Dublin Fair
- Freak Kitchen
- Goda Grannar
- The Hellacopters
- Staffan Hellstrand
- Innocent Blood
- Led Zeppelin Jam
- Locomotive Breath
- Mick Taylor All Star Band
- Molly Hatchet
- M-Train
- Nazareth
- Nomads
- Overdrive
- Saxon
- Simon Bolivar
- Ten Years After

=== 1996 ===
14–15 June, Karlshamn
- Blues Bag
- Bo Wilson Band
- Creedence Clearwater Revisited
- Deep Purple
- Dizzy Mizz Lizzy
- Drain
- Joe D'ursu
- Freak Kitchen
- Garmarna
- The Georgia Satellites
- Kent
- Uffe Larsson
- Llashram
- Lynyrd Skynyrd
- Naked
- Sigge Hill
- Sinn Fenn
- Status Quo
- Stefan Sundström

=== 1995 ===
16–17 June, Karlshamn
- Abstrakt Algebra
- Black Sabbath
- bob hund
- Billy Bremner & The Refreshments
- Lars Demian
- Electric Eskimoes
- Fairport Convention
- Flaped Forge
- Fleetwood Mac
- Freak Kitchen
- Jukka Tolonen Band
- Kashmir
- Kent
- Led Zeppelin Jam
- Los Stjärtgroggs
- Mary Beats Jane
- Planet Waves
- The Pogues
- The Quill
- Sator
- Sky High
- Spiritual Beggars
- Pat Travers
- Trouble
- Urban Turban
- Vitality
- W.E.T.
- Rolf Wikström

=== 1994 ===
10–11 June, Karlshamn
- Bazooka
- Blackfoot
- Blues Bag
- Brainpool
- Caamora
- Deep Purple
- Dia Psalma
- Electric Boys
- Lisa Ekdahl
- Emeth
- Green
- Joddla med Siv
- KSMB
- Mountain
- Pride & Glory
- Red Cloud
- Sinn Fenn
- Skintrade
- Sweet
- Underdog
- Uriah Heep
- Sven Zetterberg & Chicago Express

=== 1993 ===
11–12 June, Karlshamn
- Bachman–Turner Overdrive
- Backstage Queen
- Björnsson
- Bombyces Bryggeri
- The Boppers
- Bryngelsson Blues Blend
- Clawfinger
- Crossroad Jam
- Dragonflies In Bloomers
- Hof's
- The Hooters
- Frank Marino & Mahogany Rush
- John Mayall & the Bluesbreakers
- Nine Below Zero
- Peps Blodsband
- Something
- Stars On Mars
- T For Trouble

=== 1992 ===
6 June, Olofström
- Goda Grannar
- Madgic Crowd
- M.ill.ion
- Nazareth
- Peps Persson
- The Sinners
- Steve & the Lloyds
- Stonecake
- Sweet Little Company
- Wishbone Ash
