= Crowne (band) =

Swedish power metal band

Crowne is a Swedish power metal and melodic hard rock band. They have released three albums on Frontiers Records.

From the start, Crowne was branded as a super group. It started as a solo project for Alexander Strandell (Art Nation) produced by Jona Tee (H.E.A.T), which eventually involved Christian Lundqvist (The Poodles), John Levén (Europe) and Love Magnusson (Dynazty). This morphed into the band Crowne, pushed by the Italian label Frontiers Records, with the exception of Love Magnusson who was only a session lead guitarist. Jona Tee also called the music of Crowne "Eurovision melodic rock".

The band made their Sweden Rock Festival debut in 2023.

== Discography ==
- Kings in the North (2021)
- Operation Phoenix (2023)
- Wonderland (2025)
