= Katon =

Katon may refer to:

- Zakef katan
- Michael Katon - an American blues-rock guitarist and vocalist
- Rosanne Katon - an American model, actress, comedian and activist
