= Prahl =

Prahl is a surname. Notable people with the surname include:

- Axel Prahl (born 1960), German actor
- Georg Prahl Harbitz (1802–1889), Norwegian priest and politician
- Lita Prahl (1905–1978), Norwegian actress and costume designer
- Martin Prahl, Swedish singer-songwriter
- Norman Rudolph Prahl (1919-1996), American politician
- Tom Prahl (born 1949), Swedish footballer and manager

== See also ==
- Prahl Crags, group of rock crags in Antarctica
