= Abramis Brama (band) =

Swedish rock band

- Abramis Brama playing at Musikens Hus in Gothenburg, Sweden.

Background information
- Origin: Stockholm, Sweden
- Genre: Stoner rock
- Years active: 1997–present
- Labels: Black Lodge Records; Record Heaven; Swedish Rock Records; Transubstans Records
- Members: Peo Andersson; Ulf Torkelsson; Trisse; Mats Rydström
- Past members: Christian Andersen; Fredrik Jansson; Robert Johansson; Dennis Berg
- Website: www.abramisbrama.com

Abramis Brama is a Swedish hard rock band from Stockholm, Sweden. Founded in 1997, they carry heavy stoner/progressive influences from bands like Black Sabbath, November, and Kyuss. They sing primarily in Swedish.

== Biography ==
Abramis Brama (Latin for carp bream) formed in 1997 when Dennis Berg and Fredrik Jansson got together to start a band. Jansson was originally slated to play bass in the new band but shifted to drums when a drummer could not be found. The band was solidified by 1998 when they recorded their first demo. The band recorded their first album later that year. Dansa Tokjävelns Vals (Dance the Mad Devil's Waltz) was released the following year. All the lyrics for this album were written in Swedish. Following the release of this album original vocalist Christian Anderson left the band and was replaced by Ulf Torkelsson. A second demo, Mamma Talar, was recorded in late 1999 and was not widely distributed.

The band's second album, När Tystnaden Lagt Sig... (When Silence Is Here...), was released in early 2001. During the recording of this album the band recorded three covers, all in their native language. The Pretty Things' "Cold Stone" ("Kall Som Sten") made it onto the album while November's "Men Mitt Hjärta Ska Vara Gjort Av Sten" and Captain Beyond's "Mezmerasation Eclipse" ("Förtrollande Förmörkelse") were saved for a split single and a tribute compilation respectively.

Later that same year the band recorded their third album, Nothing Changes. They reused music from previously released songs but added completely new lyrics, this time in English. All the songs on this album except "All Is Black" have entirely new lyrics. The lyrics to "All Is Black" are a straight translation from the song "Svart".

In early 2005 the band released their fourth album, Rubicon. The release party performance saw the first appearance of live guitarist Robert "Rabbi Rob" Johansson. Shortly afterwards Jansson left the band and was replaced by former Grand Magus drummer Trisse.

In 2007 the band released a live album simply entitled Live! on Transubstans Records. It included a new studio song called I Evighetens Nav as a bonus track.

Their sixth album Smakar Söndag (Tastes like Sunday) released in 2009, featured a few guest musicians (Moa Holmsten - vocals, Rolf Leidestad - keyboards and Jonas Kullhammar - saxophone). All lyrics are again in their native language.

== Members ==
- Peo Andersson – guitar
- Ulf Torkelsson – vocals
- Fredrik "Trisse" Liefendahl – drums
- Mats Rydström – bass

Previous members

- Dennis Berg – bass (1997–2012)
- Robert "Rabbi Rob" Johansson – guitar (2005–2011)
- Fredrik Jansson – drums (1997–2005)
- Christian "Chrille" Andersen – vocals (1997–1999)

== Discography ==
=== Albums ===
Album and details	Peak positions
Album and details	SWE
Dansa tokjävelns vals: Year released: 1999; Record label: Record Heaven (CD)	
När tystnaden lagt sig: Year released: 2001; Record label: Record Heaven (CD)	
Nothing Changes: Year released: 2003; Record label: Record Heaven/Sweden Rock (CD)	
Rubicon: Year released: 2005; Record label: Sweden Rock/Nasoni Records (CD / 2 LPs)	
Live!: Year released: 2007; Record label: Transubstans Records (CD)	
Smakar söndag: Year released: 2009; Record label: Transubstans Records (CD)	33
Rubicon (re-release): Year released: 2010; Record label: BOR Records	30
Enkel biljett: Year released: 2014; Record label: Transubstans Records (CD)	54
Tusen År: Year released: 2018; Record label: Black Lodge Records (CD, LP)	32

=== Singles/EPs ===
- Split 7" with Svarte Pan (both bands cover band November) (2003)
- "Säljer din själ" CD (2004 Sweden Rock)

=== Reissue ===
- Dansa tokjävelns vals CD (2006 Transubstans Records)
- När tystnaden lagt sig CD (2007 Transubstans Records)

=== Compilation appearances ===
- "Förtrollande förmörkelse" on Thousand Days of Yesterdays - A Tribute to Captain Beyond CD (1999 Record Heaven)
- "100 dagar" on Sweden Rock Festival 2007 DigiCD (2007 Sweden Rock)
