= Ground Mower =

Swedish heavy metal band

- Origin: Stockholm, Sweden
- Genres: Heavy metal; hard rock; alternative metal
- Years active: 2004–present
- Label: Unsigned
- Members: Tomas Marklund; Richard Bång; Jonta Wigstad; Magnus Arnar
- Website: groundmower.com

Ground Mower was a Swedish Metal band consisting of Jonta Wigstad (guitar), Richard Bång (percussion and drums), Tomas Marklund (bass, backing vocals), and Magnus Arnar (lead vocals). Ground Mower was well known for having a unique metal edge that does not conform to the NWOSDM style that is particular to Sweden, Norway and Finland.

== Formation ==
Richard Bång was attending a summer music festival where he saw Magnus Arnar sing with his R&B tribute band, Soul 78, leading him to formulate plans for a new band with Magnus as lead vocalist. It had been several years since Richard had drummed professionally, but after the music festival he was led to once again pick up his sticks and get back in the game. Shortly after that, Richard's former band Face Down was in studio and asked him to lay down some tracks for their upcoming album. While he was working on the studio tracks for Face Down, Richard ran into former Mozes (death metal) band mates, Jonas Wigstad and Tomas Marklund, who were also very interested in the new band idea. Later that same year, they started playing together and writing songs.

== Style and influence ==
While Richard, Jonta and Tomas all were band mates in Mozes, and played individually in various melodic death metal bands, Richard felt more musically influenced by bands like Motörhead and Pantera. Since the time of Mozes' demise, Tomas, who always favored punk rock bands and, had also developed an interest in Irish folk music. Soul 78 was an obvious testament to Magnus' rhythm and blues influences. The intertwining and meshing of the different influences and styles was very unusual. The quartet's music easily glides along a well oiled metal pathway, but could also fall into a number of other rock subgenres.

The most common subgenre of rock Ground Mower is perceived to fall into is grunge/alternative rock. Though Sweden was not pulled into the throes of the grunge movement that swept across the United States, and even across the Atlantic to the United Kingdom as evidenced by the popularity of Bush, reviews of Ground Mower's music from both the US and the UK have likened it to various grunge influences, attributable at least in part to the band's 'raw' type of sound.

== Discography ==
2008: War Machine

No.	Title	Writer(s)	Length
1.	"Down"	J. Wigstad, T. Marklund, R. Bång, M. Arnar	3:15
2.	Untitled	J. Wigstad, T. Marklund, R. Bång, M. Arnar	2:58
3.	"Hide"	J. Wigstad, T. Marklund, R. Bång, M. Arnar	3:58
4.	"Carved In Stone"	J. Wigstad, T. Marklund, R. Bång, M. Arnar	2:44
5.	"War Machine"	J. Wigstad, T. Marklund, R. Bång, M. Arnar	3:57
6.	"Last Ride"	J. Wigstad, T. Marklund, R. Bång, M. Arnar	2:55
7.	"Mr. Do-Right!"	J. Wigstad, T. Marklund, R. Bång, m. Arnar	2.37
8.	"Painwave"	J. Wigstad, T. Marklund, R. Bång, M. Arnar	3:41
9.	"Beyond the Sun"	J. Wigstad, Ground Mower	3:41
10.	"Stand Alone"	J. Wigstad, T. Marklund, R. Bång, M. Arnar	2:29
11.	"Burning Present Waste"	J. Wigstad, T. Marklund, R. Bång, M. Arnar	3:20

Ground Mower "Down" (2008)
22 sec sample of "Down" from Ground Mower's "War Machine".

== Notoriety ==
Kerrang! magazine rated Ground Mower's debut album a very coveted 4Ks.

Mark Cooper of Glasswerk magazine said,

Ground Mower exude[s] that metal aggression and power, with strong, swamp thick guitar chords and a weight derived from intense drumming; but in the same breath they pull out the groove and hooks of rock and roll with out any after thought-mainly because they are intent on achieving a complete sound and feel.

The results are a constant assault, haymaker after haymaker, until with ’War machine’ they take the gloves off and its unprotected taped fists raining down…then with ’Last ride’ the fists are dipped in broken glass and the attack continues, it’s only when they get set on fire that you potentially lose consciousness-like a beating, that you actually enjoy.

The band's music has also garnered the attention of former Iron Maiden member Bruce Dickinson, who has been known to randomly crank up Ground Mower on his BBC 6 Music radio show.

Ground Mower was also the hand-picked metal band to play on the Gibson Stage at Sweden Rock on June 4, 2009.

== Notes ==
Ground Mower artikel på Svenska
