= Pilgrimz =

Danish hard rock/metalcore band

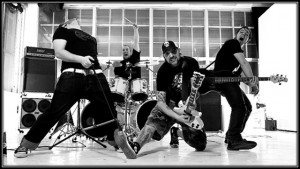
Pilgrimz

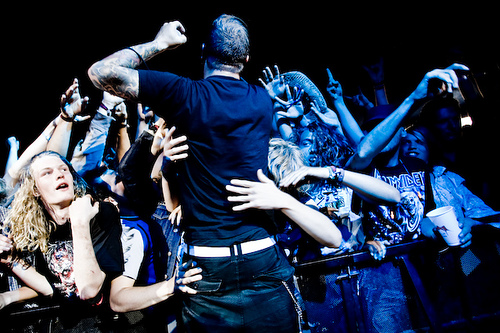

Pilgrimz is a Danish rock band from the city of Nykøbing Falster on the island of Falster, Denmark. The band formed in 1998, from members Max Christensen (vocals) and Michael "Aage" Aagesen (guitar), who set out to experiment with the crossing of Metal and Hardcore. Later, Daniel Hermann (bass) and Niels Larsen (drums) joined. Pilgrimz play overdriven metal music and hard rock, with elements of punk rock and hardcore metal.

Officially announced on their Facebook page that the band was "dead" in 2013.

== History ==
Pilgrimz released their first EP Goodday mister president in 2003 – a four-track. Half a year after they released another EP, Small minds - great knowledge as a mini CD. The EP was recorded by and at Jacobhansen Studios.

The band recorded their first album Boar Riders with Jacob Hansen, and the album was mixed and mastered by Tue Madsen at Antfarm Studios. It was released in 2008 by I Scream Records. Pilgrimz signed with the booking agency The Agency Group. This took them touring as warm-up for artists like Raised Fist and Gojira (band).

In the summer of 2008 and 2009 Pilgrimz played at Roskilde Festival, Hultsfred Festival, Sweden Rock Festival and Ruisrock.

They are releasing their second album (Self titled) later in 2012

== Discography ==
- 2006 – Goodday mister president EP
- 2007 – Small minds Great knowledge EP
- 2008 – Boar Riders Album (I scream records)
- 2012 – Self titled Album
