= Rexoria =

Swedish heavy metal band

Rexoria is a Swedish melodic heavy metal/power metal band.

The band is based around Jönköping, with members also coming from Stockaryd and Nässjö. Rexoria played the Sweden Rock Festival in 2024.

== Discography ==
Studio albums

- Queen of Light (2018)
- Ice Breaker (2019)
- Imperial Dawn (2023)
- Fallen Dimension (2026)

EPs

- Moments of Insanity (2016)
- The World Unknown (2017)
