= Fejd =

Swedish folk band

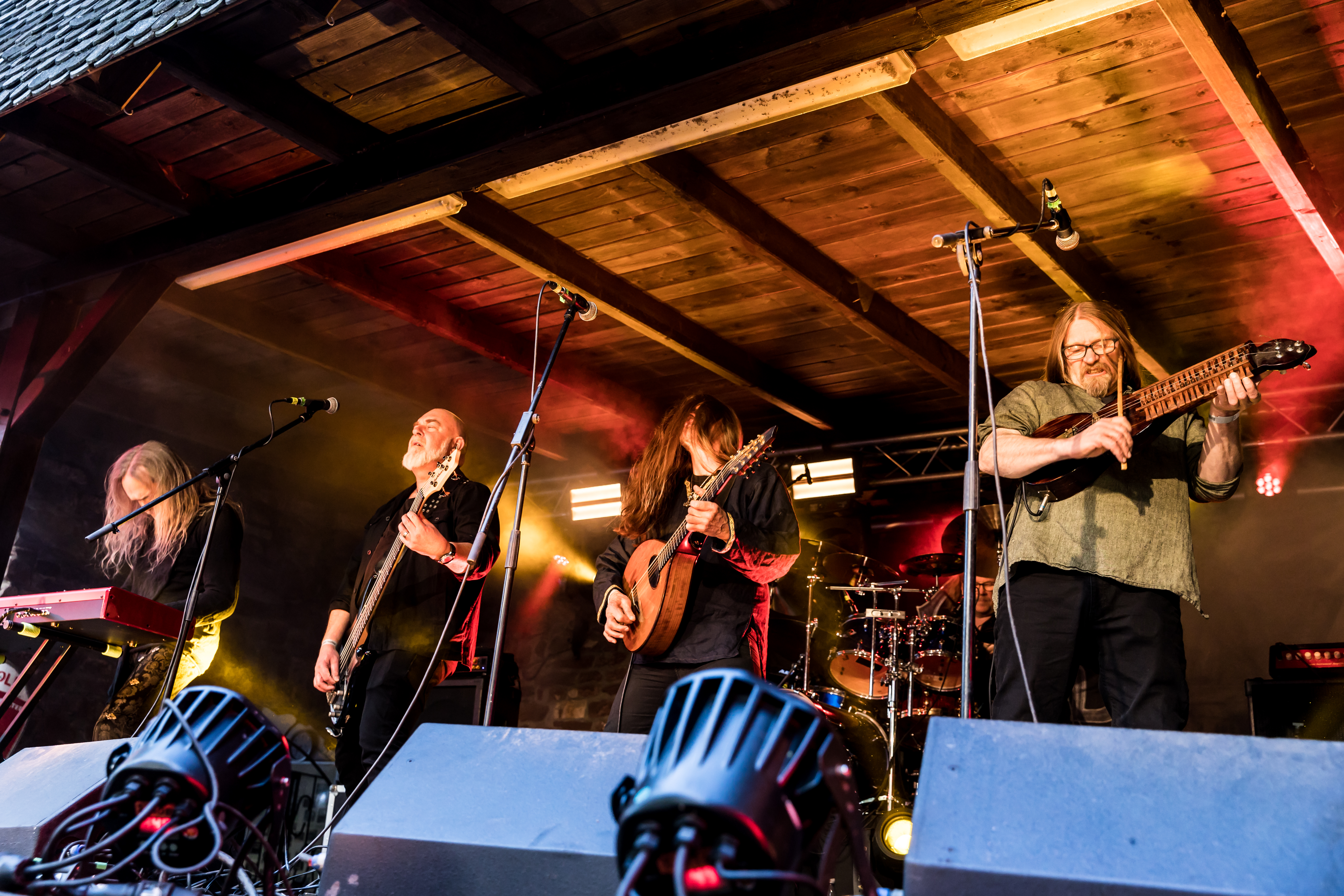
- Fejd performing at the 2026 Dark Troll Festival at Bornstedt Castle, Germany.

Background information
- Origin: Sweden
- Genres: heavy metal Folk rock Folk metal (later)
- Years active: 2001–present
- Labels: Dead End Exit, Napalm Records
- Members: Patrik Rimmerfors; Niklas Rimmerfors; Lennart Specht; Thomas Antonsson; Esko Salow
- Past members: Per-Owe Solvelius
- Website: www.fejd.se

Fejd is a Swedish folk metal band formed in 2001.

== History ==
In 2001, Patrik and Niklas Rimmerfors (both once played as a duo under the name Rimmerfors) joined forces with their musicians Lennart Specht, Thomas Antonsson and Esko Salow to form the band Fejd. Specht, Antonsson and Salow also played together in Pathos and Nostradameus. The band made their first appearances in 2002. After three self-produced demos and EPs, their debut album Storm was released via Napalm Records in 2009. In the same year, the band participated in Wacken Open Air.

In 2022 the band participated in Sweden Rock Festival and Hellfest Open Air.

== Musical style ==
Fejd's music is rooted in the typical melodic themes of the Nordic folk music and neofolk with rock influence. They usually incorporate a diverse selection of folk instruments, such as moraharpa, bouzouki, jew's harp, säckpipa, hurdy-gurdy and many others. Since 2016's Trolldom, the metal elements are more prominent in the band's music. Their lyrics are mostly written in Swedish.

== Personnel ==
- Patrik Rimmerfors – lead vocals, bouzouki, säckpipa, jaw harp, hurdy-gurdy, cow antler, recorder, willow pipe (2001–present)
- Niklas Rimmerfors – nyckelharpa, backing vocals (2001–present)
- Lennart Specht – keyboards (2001–present)
- Thomas Antonsson – bass (2001–present)
- Esko Salow – drums, percussion (2001–present)
- Per-Owe Solvelius – guitars (2015–2022)

== Gallery ==
Band members at Dark Troll Festival 2026, Germany

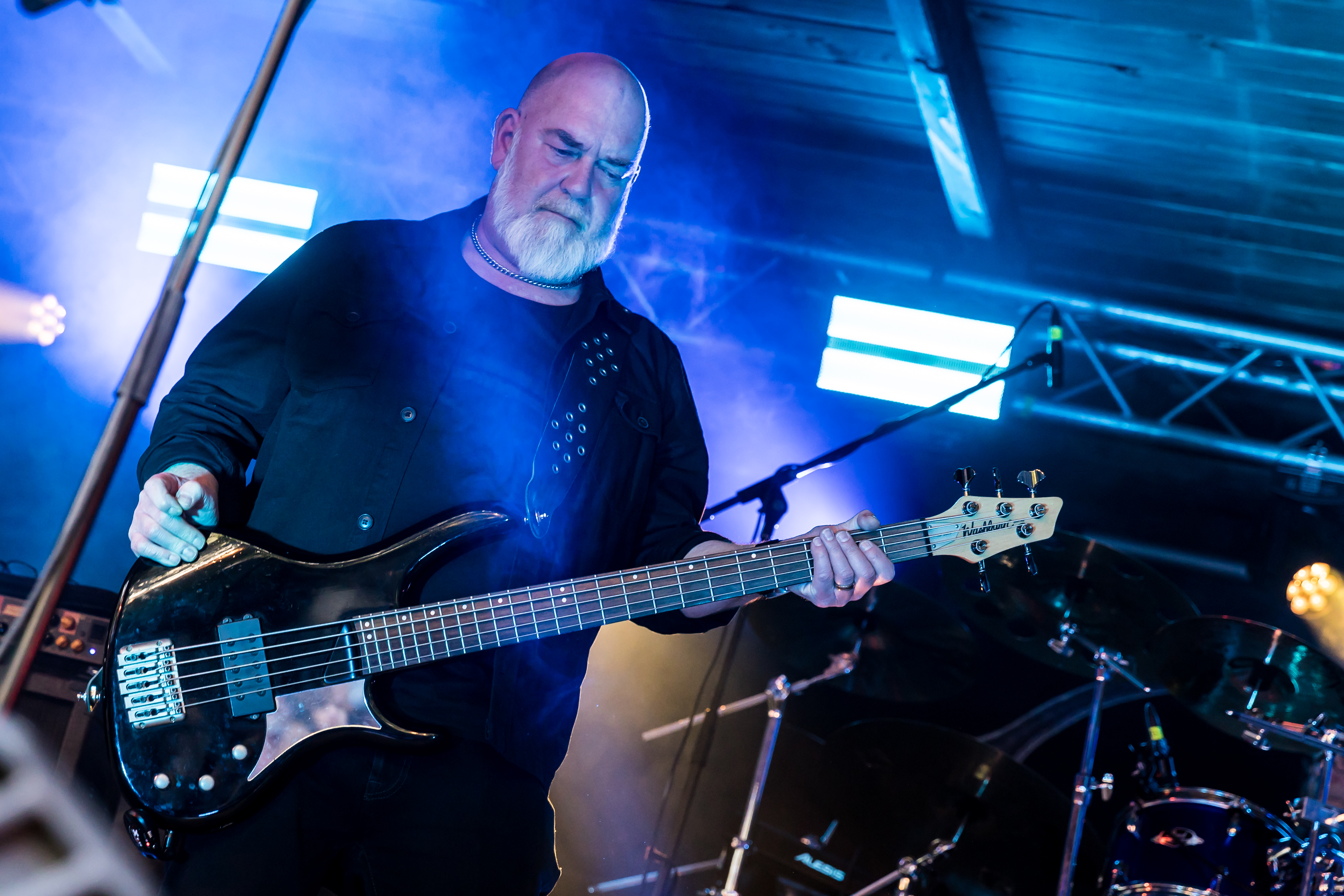
Thomas Antonsson, bass

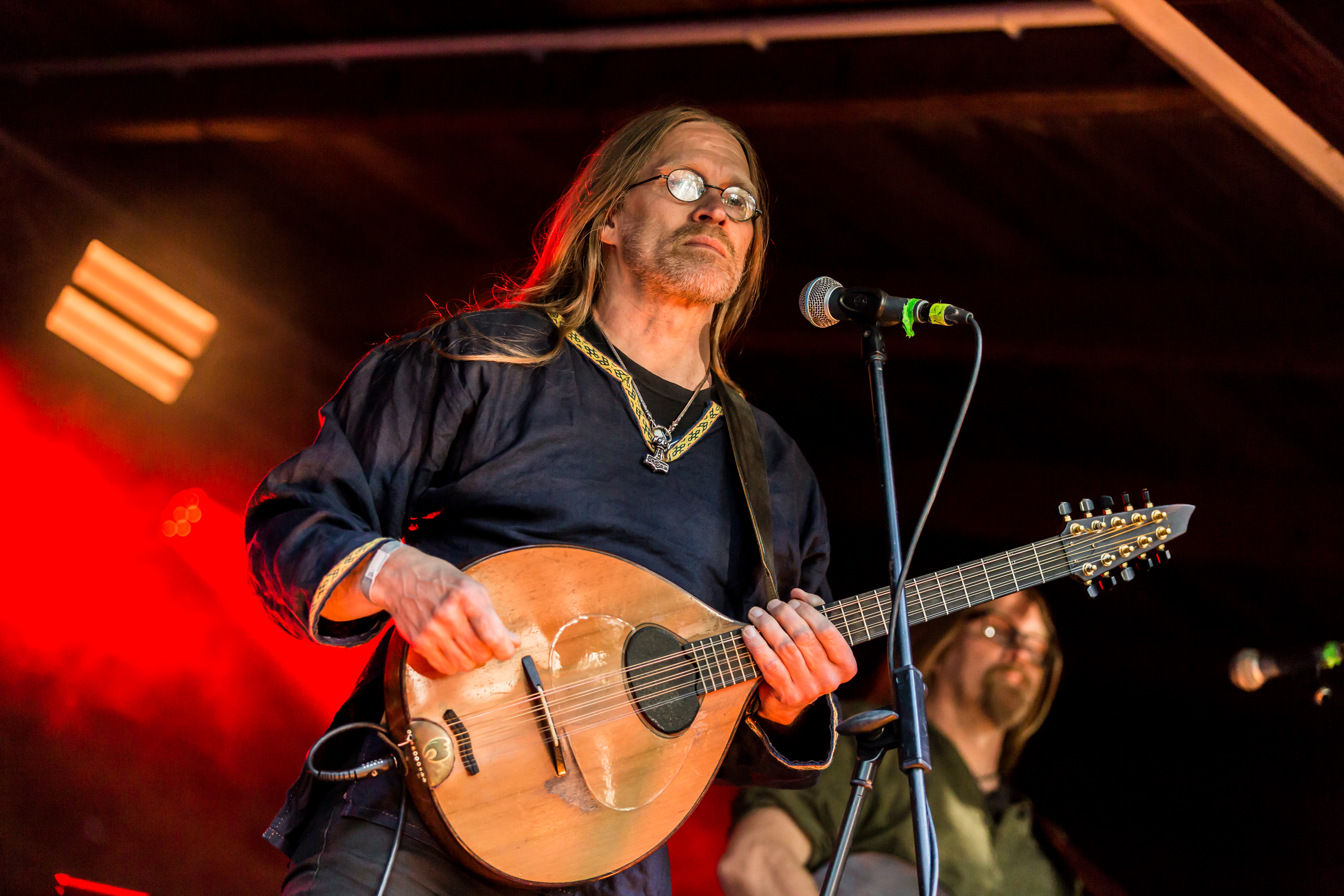
Patrik Rimmerfors, horns, vocals, bouzouki, hurdy-gurdy, mouth harp, swedish bagpipes, willow flute, recorder

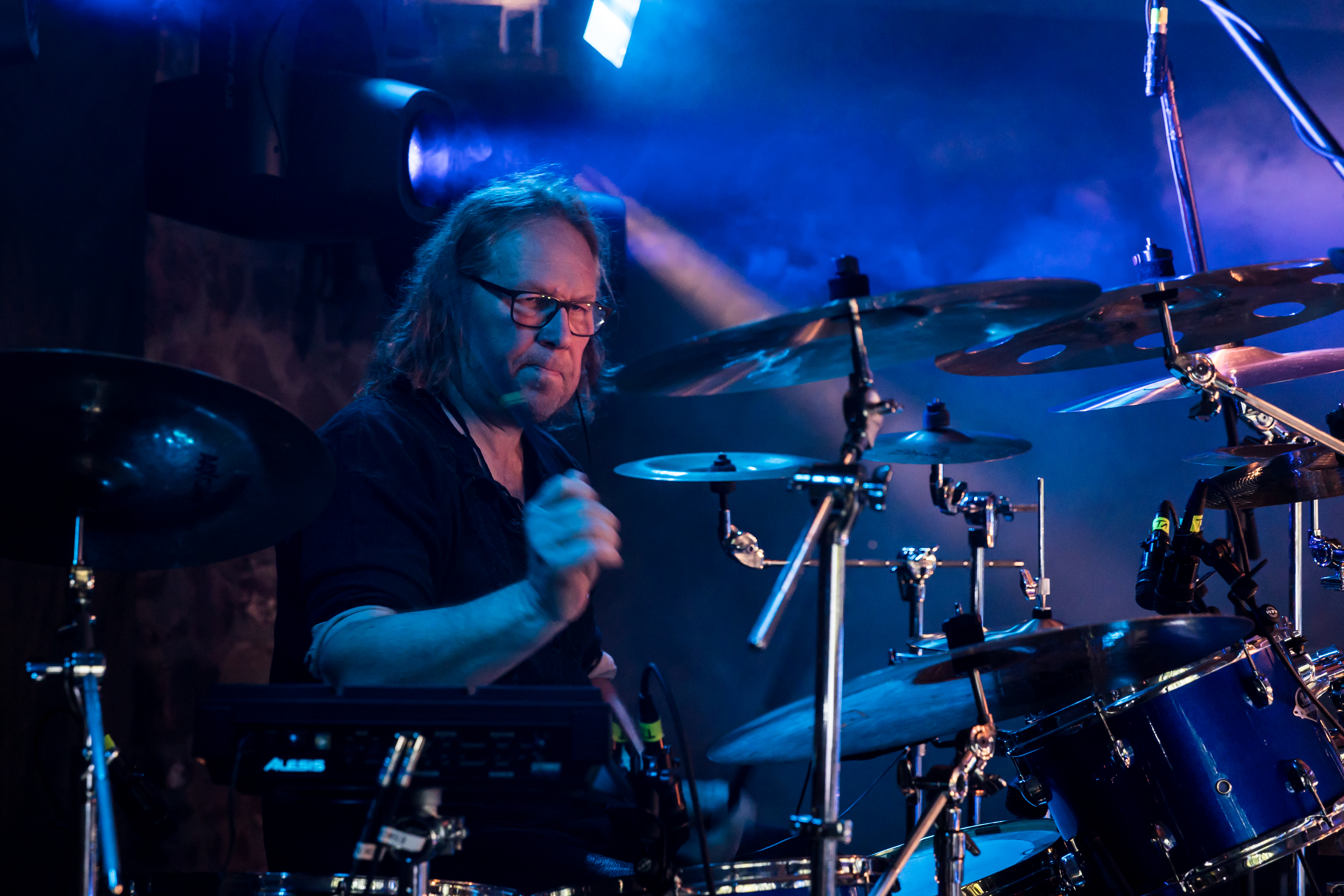
Esko Salow, drums

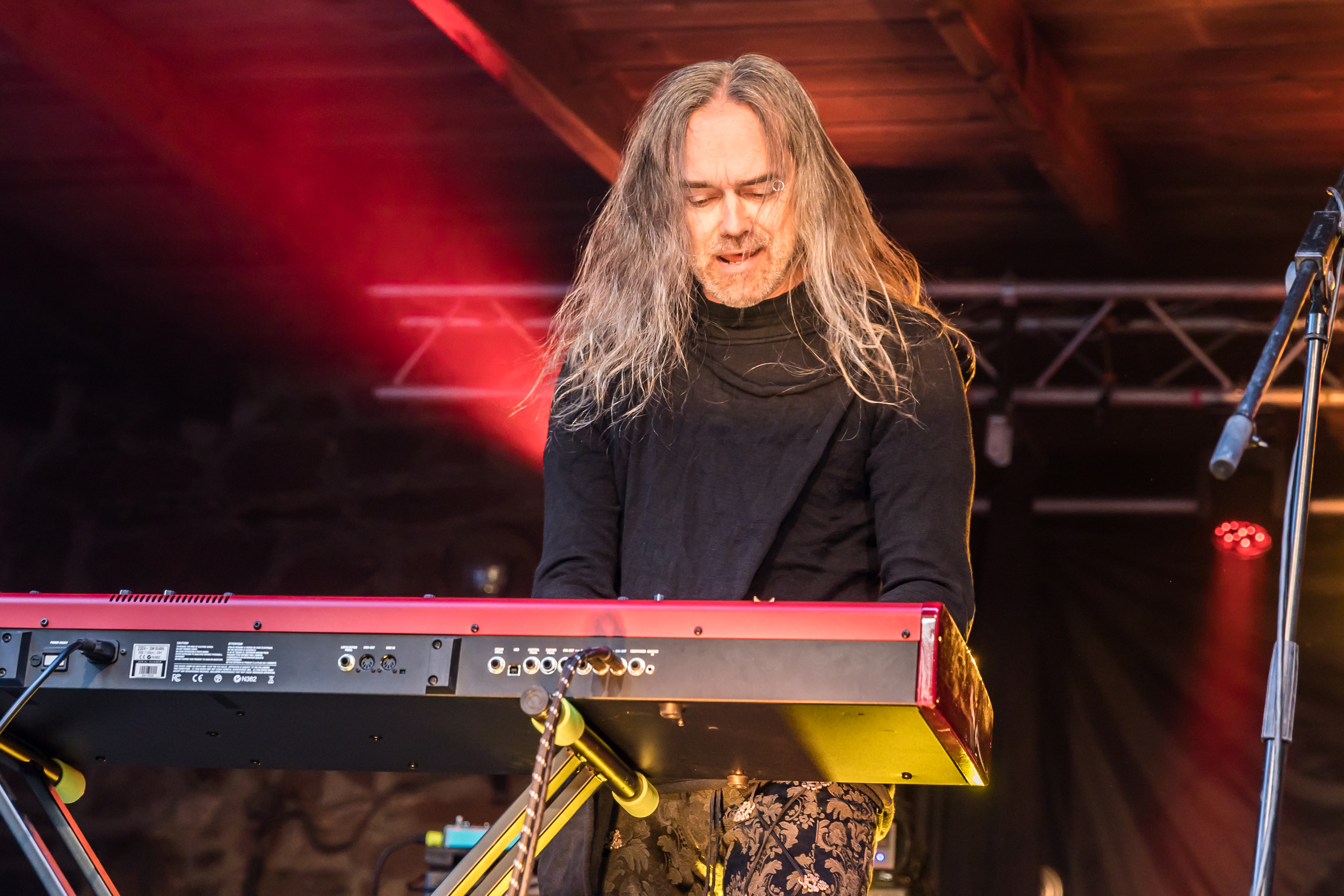
Lennart Specht, keyboards

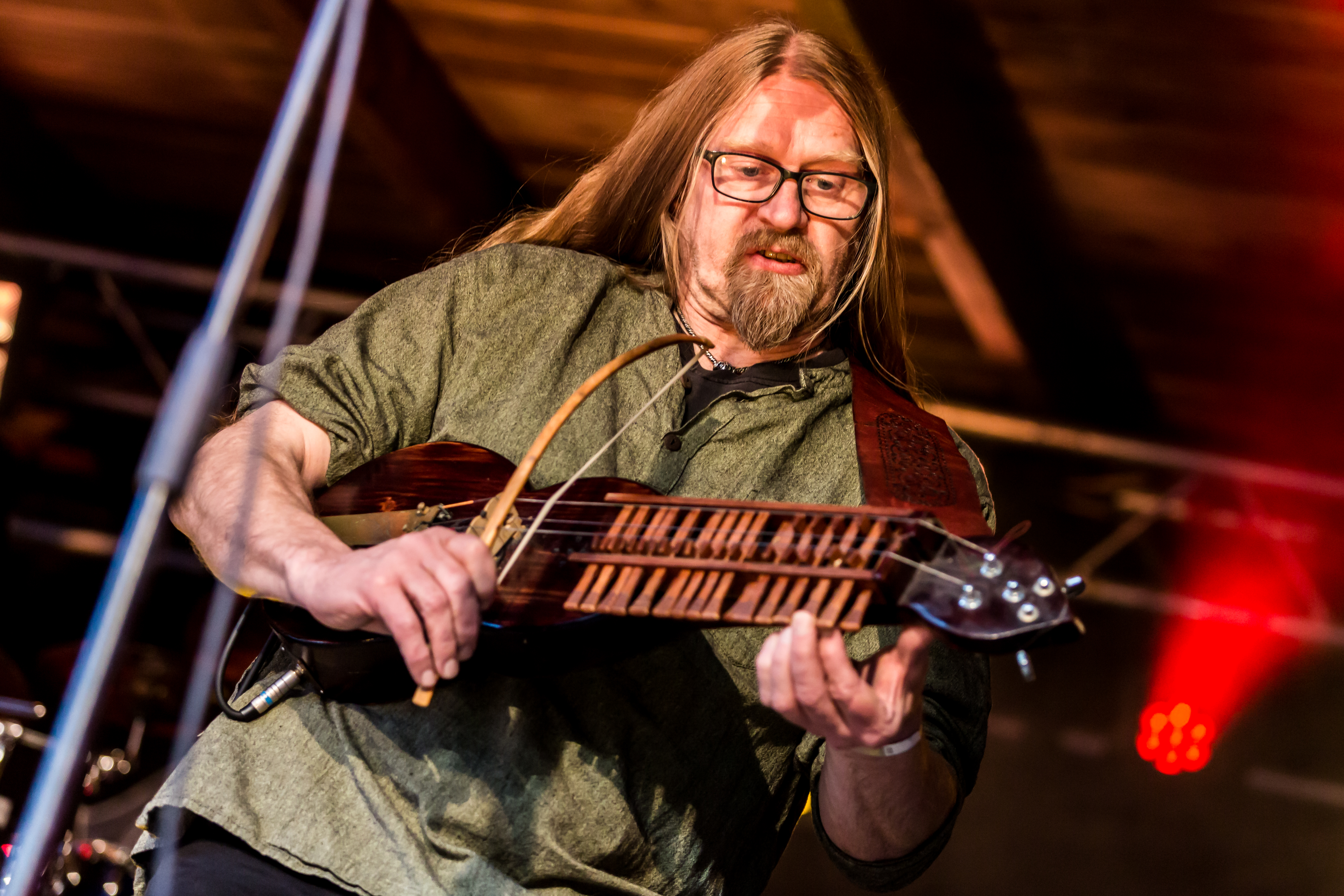
Niklas Rimmerfors, vocals and moraharpa

== Discography ==
Studio albums

- Storm (2009)
- Eifur (2010)
- Nagelfar (2013)
- Trolldom (2016)

EP

- Eld (2006)
- Härjaren (2016)
- Strilja (2021)

Demo

- I en tid som var (2002)
- Huldran (2004)
