= Eclipse (band) =

Swedish rock band

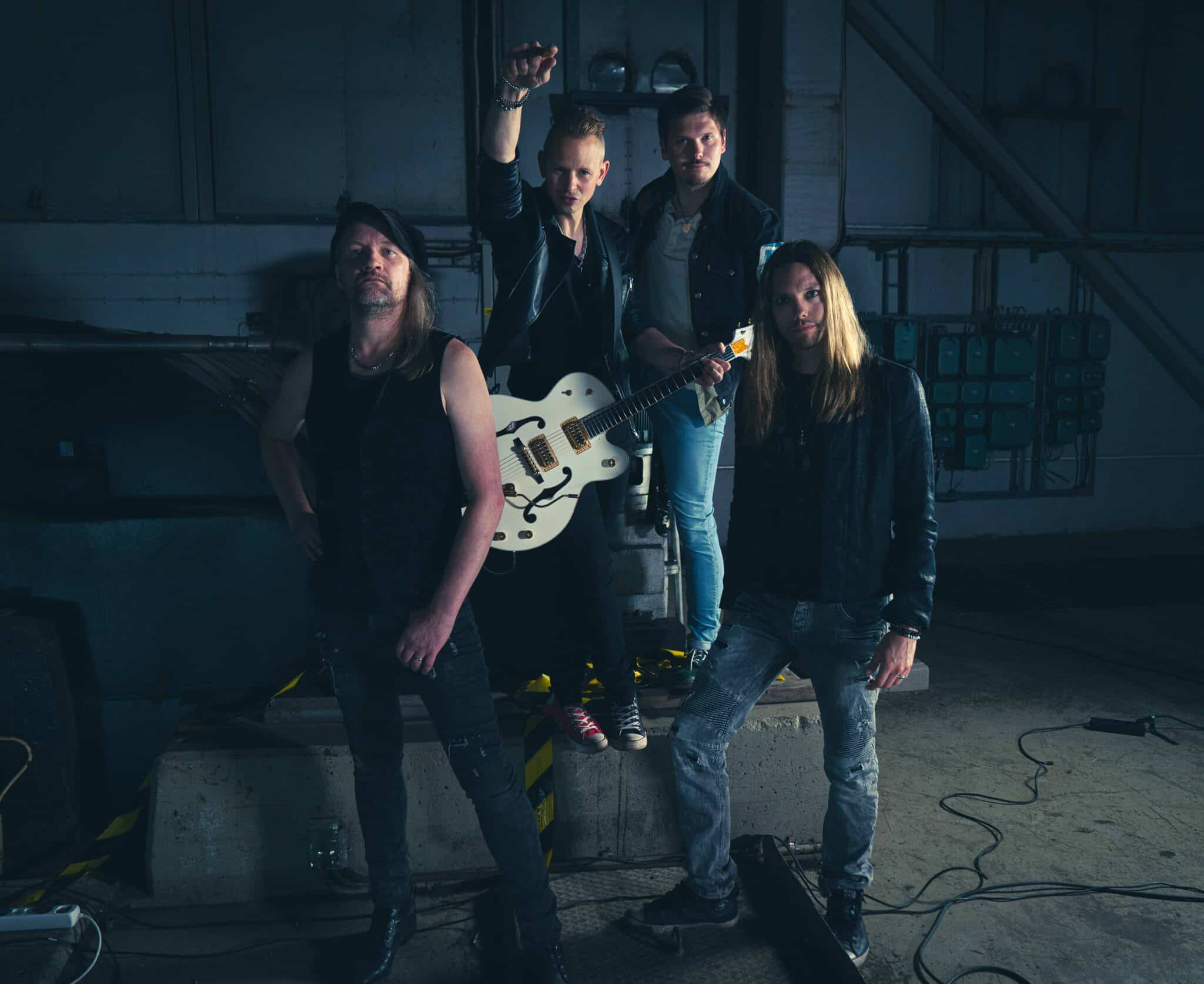
- Eclipse in 2021

Background information
- Origin: Stockholm, Sweden
- Genres: Hard rock; heavy metal; AOR
- Years active: 1999–present
- Labels: Z Records; Frontiers
- Members: Erik Mårtensson; Magnus Henriksson; Magnus Andreasson; Victor Crusner
- Past members: Anders Berlin; Fredrik Folkare; Johannes Kagelind; Peter Hallgren; Johan Berlin; Robban Bäck; Magnus Ulfstedt; Philip Crusner
- Website: eclipsemania.com

Eclipse is a Swedish hard rock band from Stockholm, formed in 1999. The band's current lineup consists of vocalist Erik Mårtensson, guitarist Magnus Henriksson, drummer Magnus "Adde" Andreasson and bassist Victor Crusner.

== History ==
The band was formed in 1999 in Stockholm by singer/guitarist/bassist Erik Mårtensson and drummer/keyboardist Anders Berlin. Together with guitarist Magnus Henriksson they received a record deal with English label Z Records. The band's debut album, The Truth and a Little More was released in 2001.

Eclipse later received a contract with the Italian label Frontiers Records and released the album Second To None in April 2004. In 2008, they released the album Are You Ready to Rock. Erik Mårtensson then wrote most of the song material for the side project WET which consisted of members from Work of Art (W), Eclipse (E) and Talisman (T). Their self-titled debut was released in 2009 and became famous in the genre of melodic hard rock and the AOR radio format.

In 2012, they released the album Bleed & Scream. The title track was released as a single and also became the band's first official video. The album entered Sverigetopplistan at number-44.

The band released their fifth album Armageddonize in February 2015, which debuted at number-49 on Sverigetopplistan. On 30, November 2015, SVT announced that Eclipse would participate in Melodifestivalen 2016 with the song "Runaways". The song was written by Erik Mårtensson, and competed in the fourth semi-final which took place 27 February in Gävle. Eclipse finished in fifth place and were eliminated from the competition.

The band released their sixth album Monumentum in March 2017 and then appeared on day 1 of the Frontiers Rock Festival IV held in Trezzo (Milano), Italy, 29–30 March 2017. In support of the album release, the band started a nine-country 18-date tour on 31 March 2017.

== Members ==
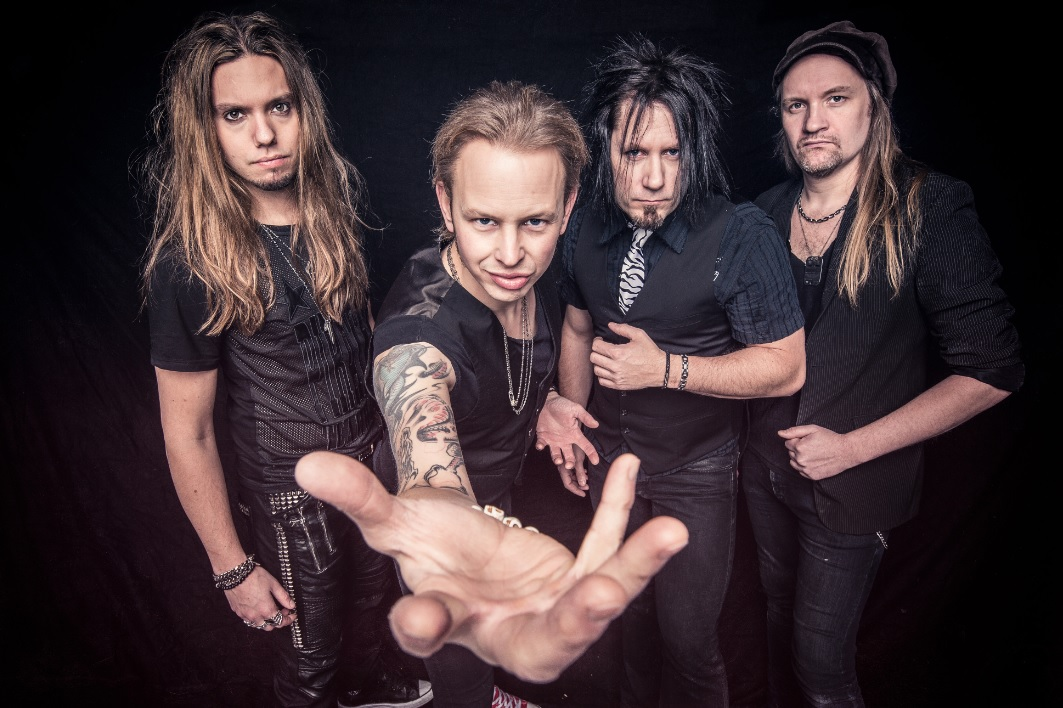
The band in 2017

=== Current ===
- Erik Mårtensson – vocals, guitar, bass (1999–present)
- Magnus Henriksson – guitar (1999–present)
- Magnus "Adde" Andreasson – drums (2025-present)
- Victor Crusner – bass (2019–present)

=== Former ===
- Robban Bäck – drums (2006–2015)
- Magnus Ulfstedt – bass (2014–2019), drums (2000–2006)
- Anders Berlin – drums, keyboard, percussion (1999–2004)
- Fredrik Folkare – bass (2003–2008)
- Johannes Kagelind – bass
- Peter Hallgren – bass
- Johan Berlin – keyboard (2006–2014)
- Philip Crusner – drums (2015–2025)

=== Guest performances in the studio ===
- Mats Olausson – keyboard
- Kee Marcello – guitar
- Annelie Pandora Magnusson - vocals
- Madeleine Johansson – cello
- Johan Fahlberg - background vocals
- David Wallin - background vocals

== Discography ==
=== Studio albums ===
- The Truth and a Little More (2001)
- Second to None (2004)
- Are You Ready to Rock (2008)
- Bleed & Scream (2012)
- Are You Ready to Rock MMXIV (2014)
- Armageddonize (2015)
- Monumentum (2017)
- Paradigm (2019)
- Wired (2021)
- Megalomanium (2023)
- Megalomanium II (2024)

=== Live albums ===
- Viva La VicTOURia (Live) (2020)

=== Single ===
- "Bleed & Scream" / "Come Hell or High Water" / "Into the Fire" (2012)
- "Stand on Your Feet" (2015)
- "Runaways" (2016)
- "Vertigo" (2017) [released 12 January 2017; 1st single from Momentum]
- "Never Look Back" (2017) [released 31 January 2017; 2nd single from Momentum]
