= Brothers of Metal =

Swedish power metal band

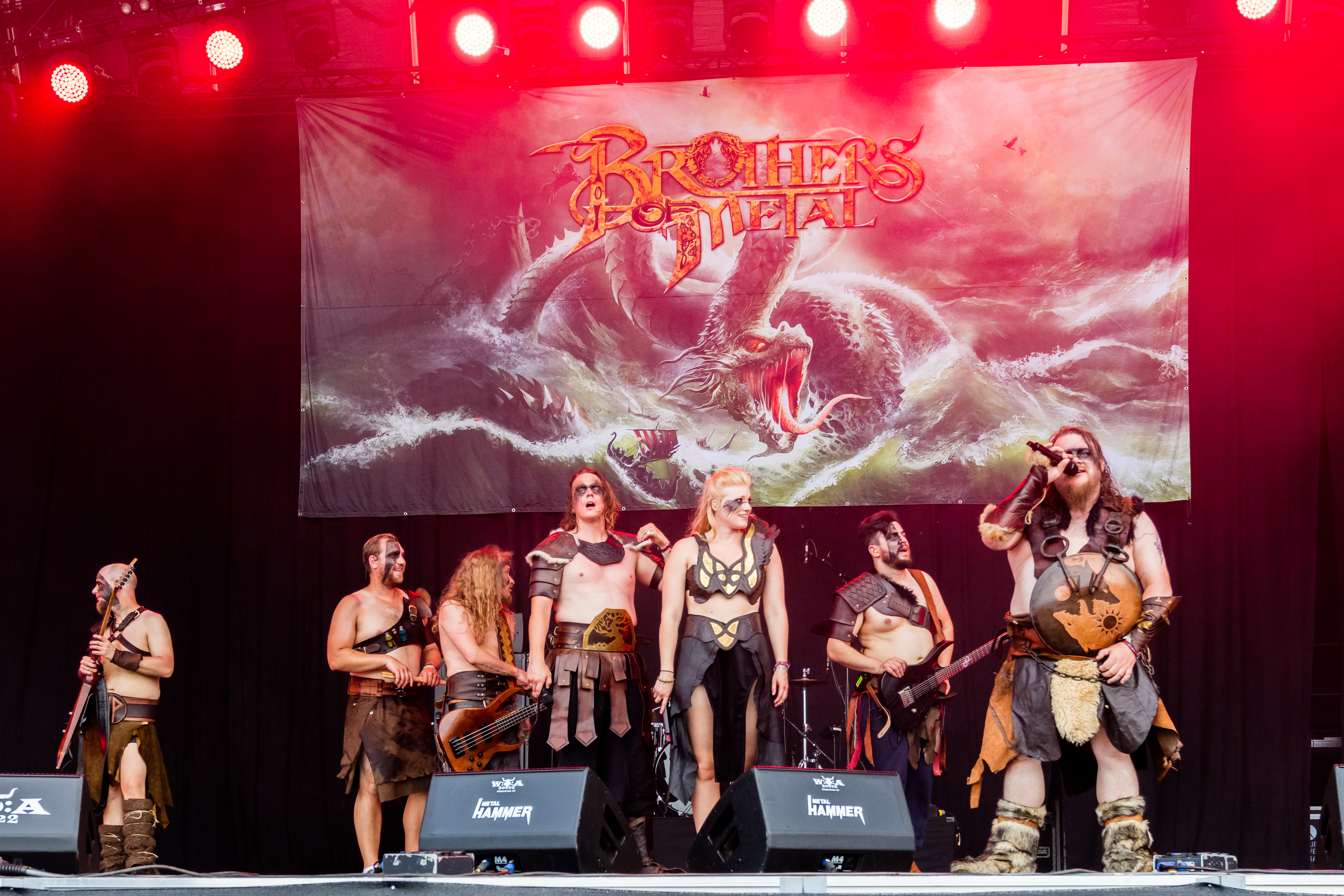
- Brothers of Metal at Wacken Open Air 2022

Background information
- Origin: Falun, Sweden
- Genre: Power metal
- Years active: 2012–present
- Label: AFM Records
- Members: Joakim Lindbäck Eriksson; Ylva Eriksson; Dawid Grahn; Johan Johansson; Mats Ove Nilsson; Pähr Nilsson; Emil Wärmedal
- Past members: Mikael Fehrm
- Website: brothersofmetal.net

The band's logo

Brothers of Metal are an eight-piece Swedish power metal band formed in Falun in 2012. The band's aesthetic and lyrics are inspired by Vikings and Norse mythology, and often purposefully over-the-top, which earns them criticism and praise.

== History ==
Brothers of Metal was formed in 2012 to create "true metal". Drinking led to their first song, "Son of Odin". The band self-released their debut album, Prophecy of Ragnarök, in April 2017. It was re-released in November 2018 via AFM Records.

The band's second album, Emblas Saga, was released on 10 January 2020 via AFM Records. Prior to the album, the singles "Njord", "One", and "Brothers Unite" were released. In support of the album, the band went on the European The Pagan Thor Tour 2020 in January, co-headlining with Italian folk metal band Elvenking. Throughout 2020 and 2021, the band released music videos for multiple songs featured on Emblas Saga.

Following the lift of COVID-19 restrictions in Sweden, Brothers of Metal played their first show in more than two years in Stockholm on 27 March 2022.

In summer 2022, the band played at Wacken Open Air for the first time.

In September 2022, Brothers of Metal toured the UK and Ireland as support for British power metal band Gloryhammer for their Fly Away Tour 2022.

In early 2024, Brothers of Metal supported Gloryhammer and Beast in Black on their Glory and the Beast double headline tour in Europe.

On 21 June 2024, the band released a music video for the song "Heavy Metal Viking", the first single of the then-upcoming album Fimbulvinter, which was announced on the same day. A lyric video for the single "Nanna's Fate" was released on 16 August, and on 27 September, the band released a music video for the album's title track.

On 30 August 2024, German medieval metal group Saltatio Mortis released the single "Fire and Ore", which featured all Brothers of Metal vocalists. The release was accompanied by a lyric video.

The band's third studio album, Fimbulvinter, was released on 1 November 2024 via AFM Records. The album includes "The Other Son of Odin" and "Berserkir", which were released as singles in 2022.

== Members ==
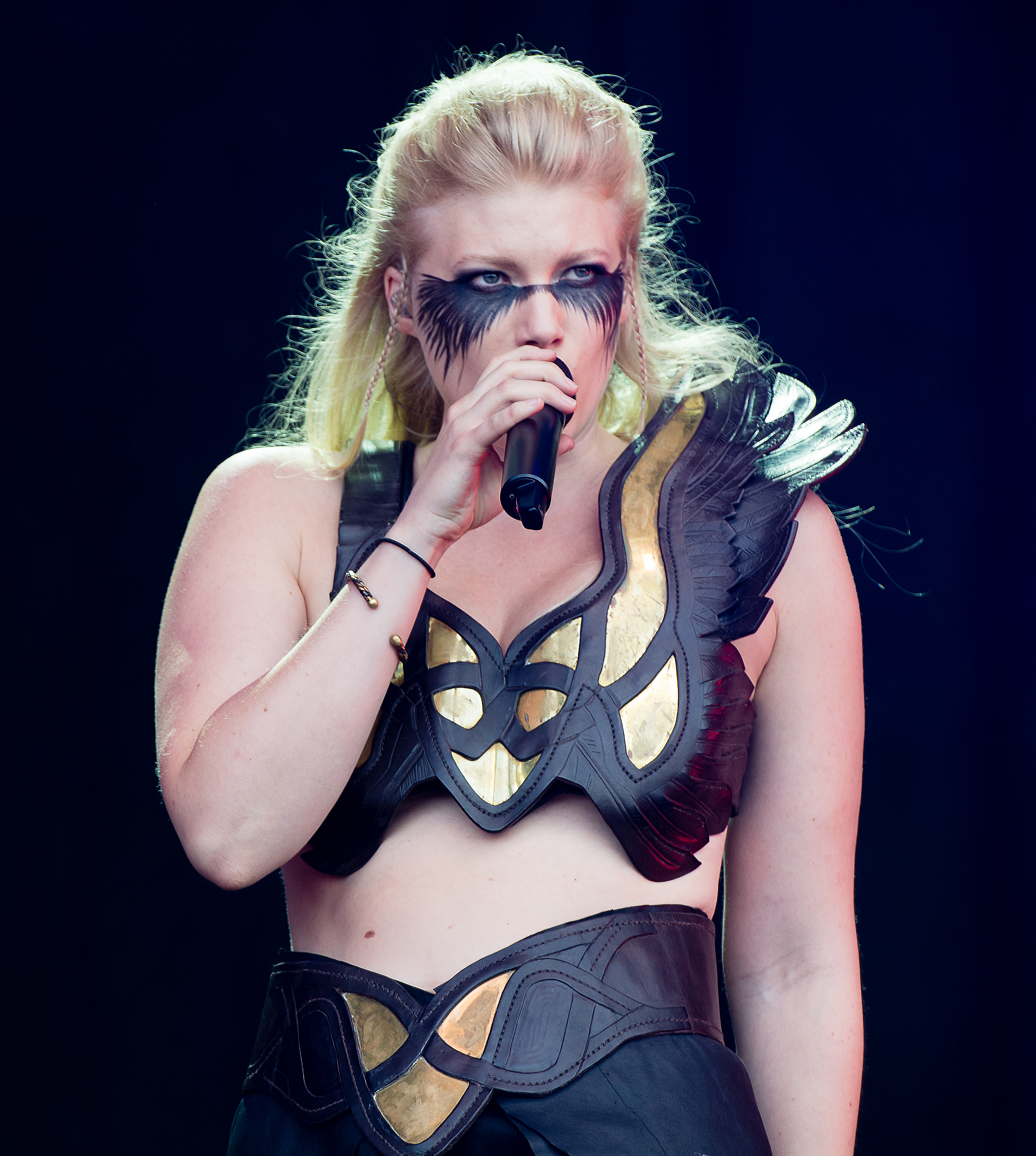
Ylva Eriksson

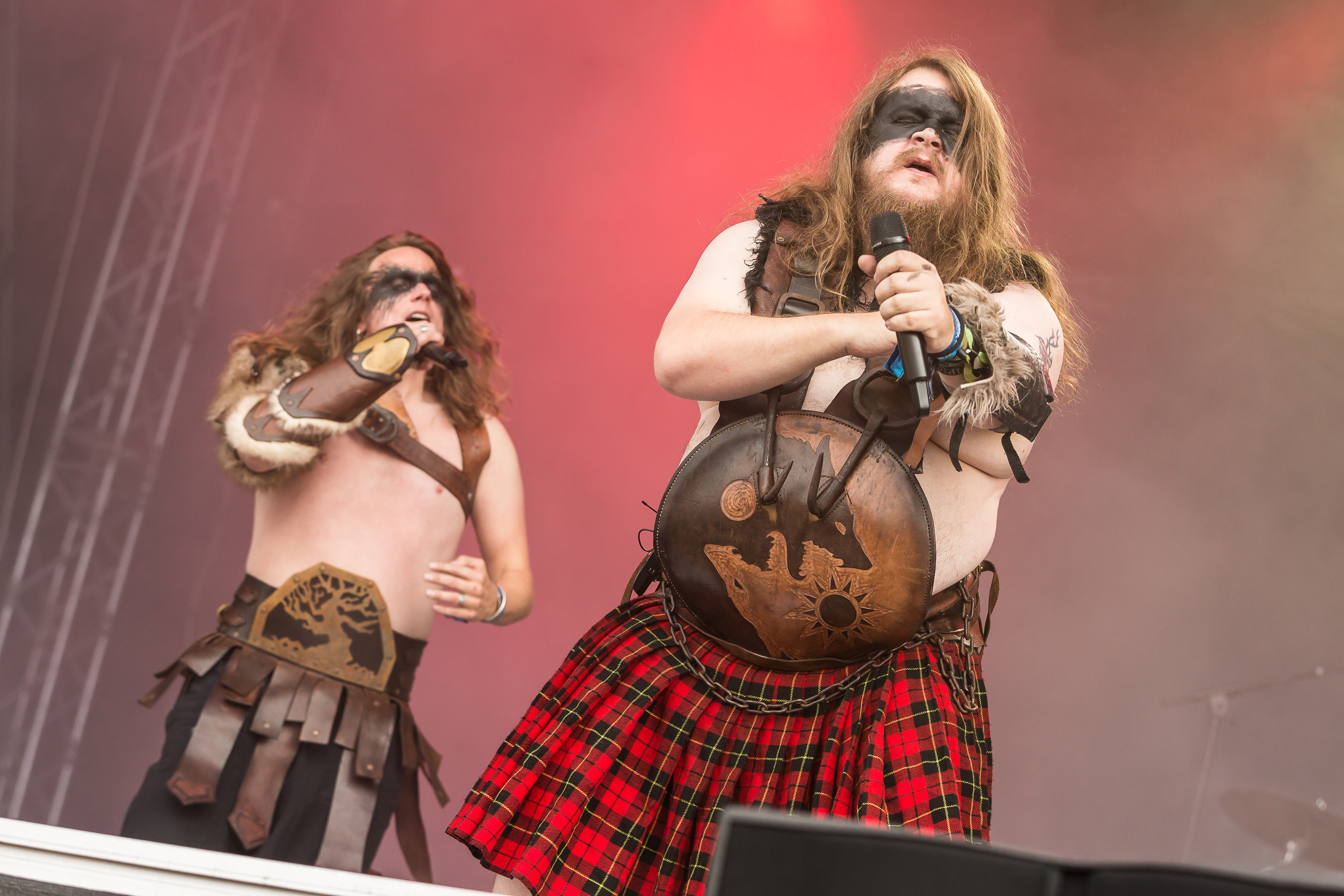
Joakim Eriksson and Mats Nilsson

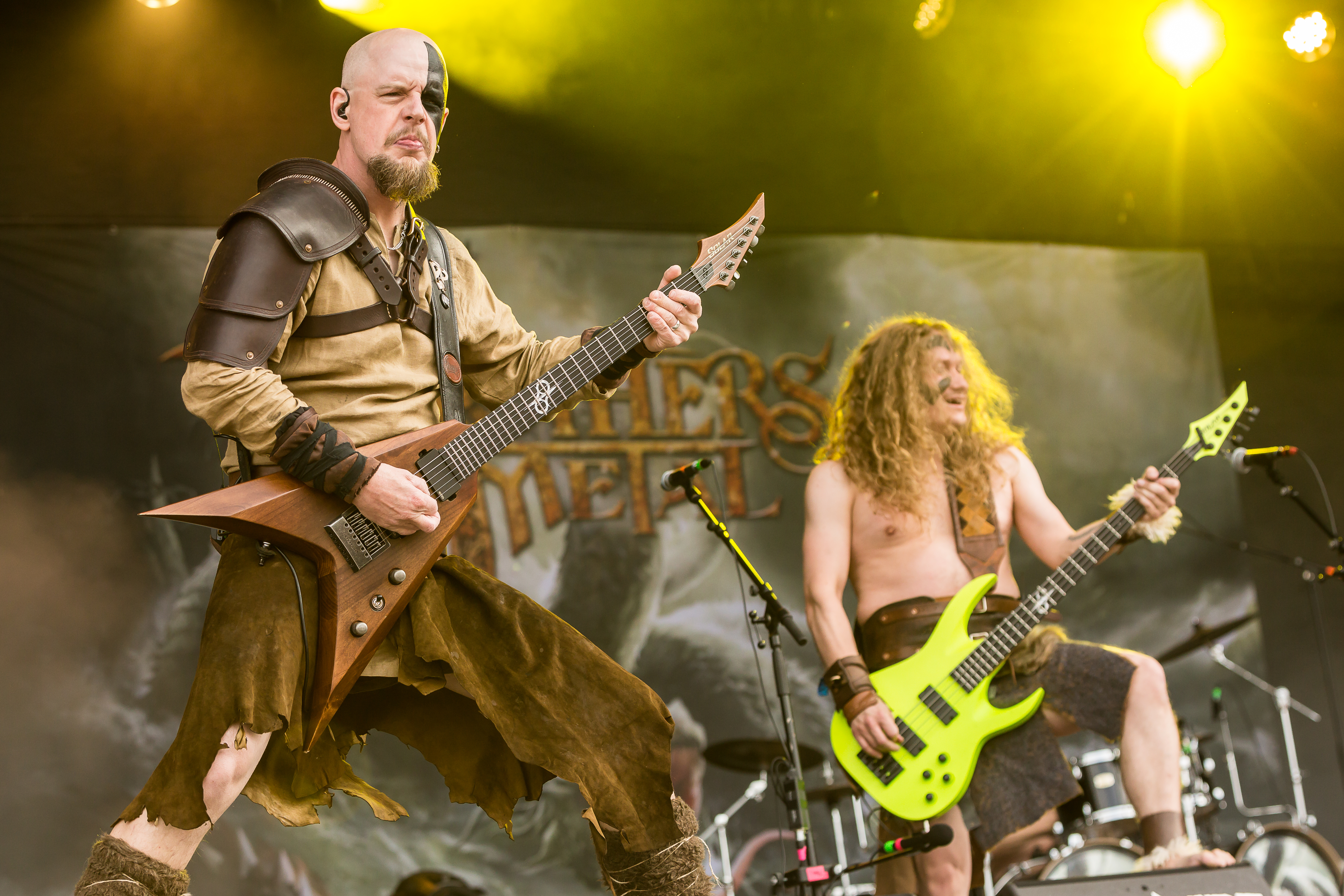
Pähr Nilsson and Emil Wärmedal

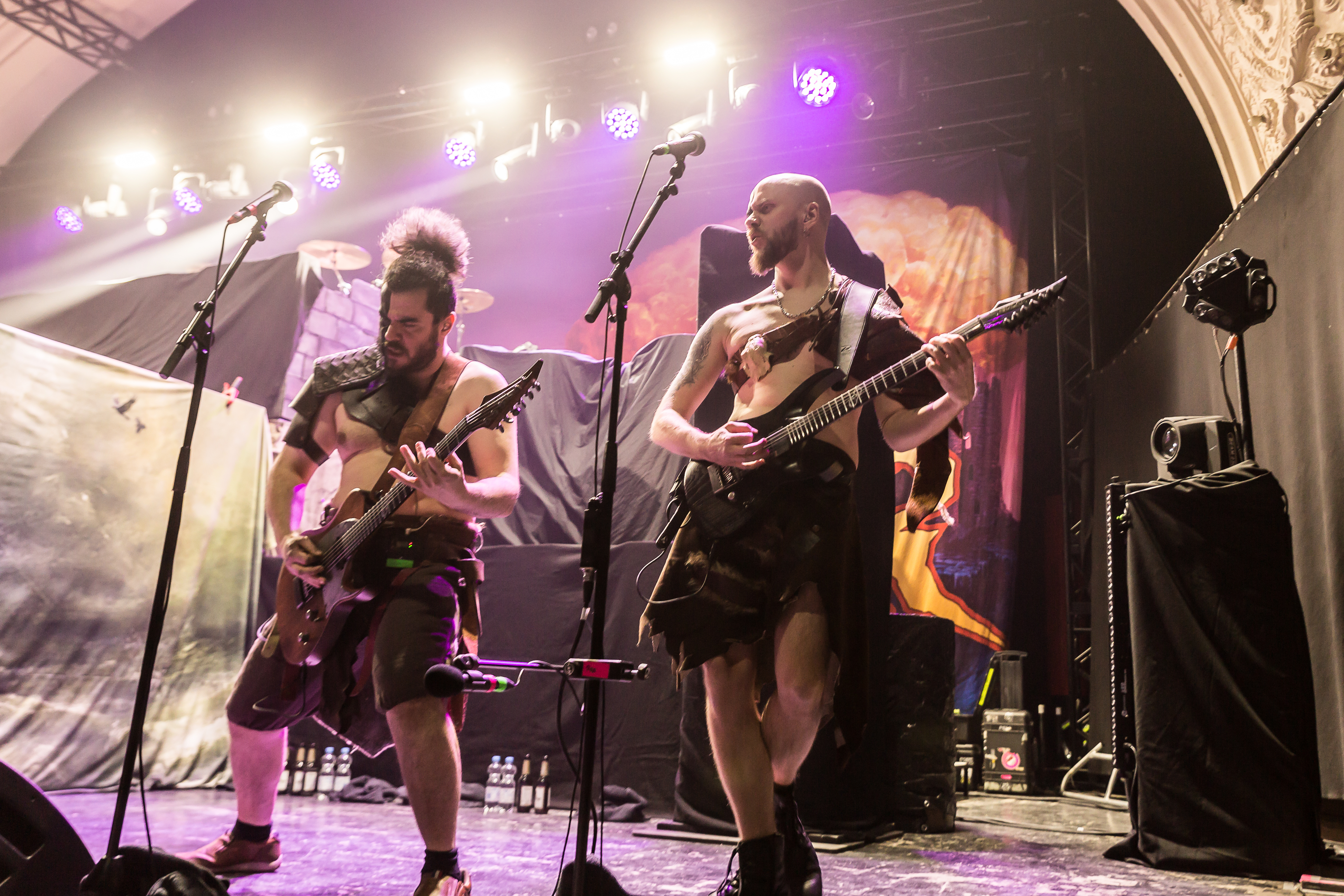
Dawid Grahn and Christian Larsson

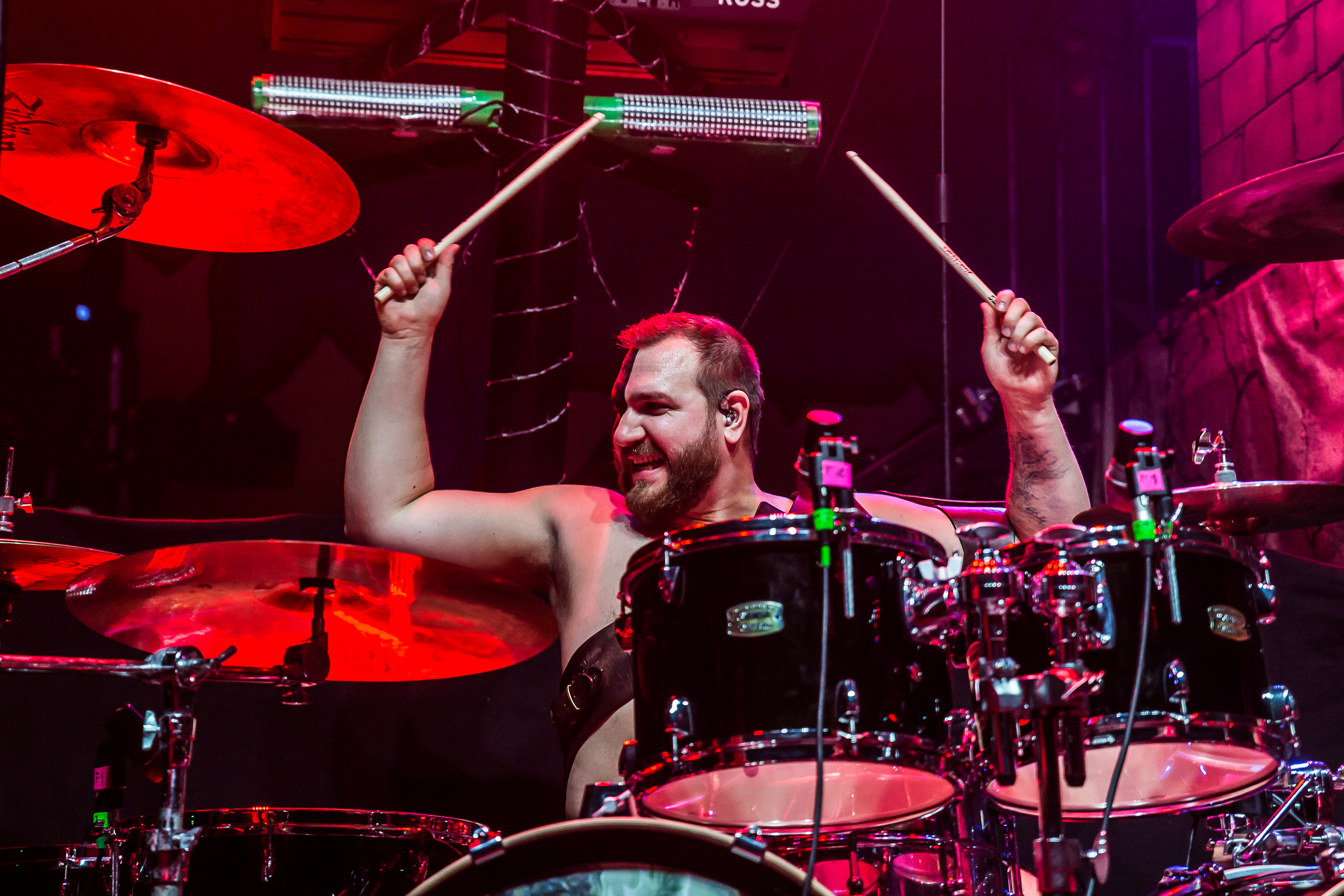
Johan Johansson

For a long time, the band was an eight-piece consisting of three vocalists (two male, one female), three guitar players, a bass player, and a drummer. In August 2023, it was announced that guitarist Mikael Fehrm would leave the band due to medical issues. He had not been playing live shows for some time. Even after his departure, the band still acts as an octet on stage, with Christian Larsson added as live guitarist. He had been playing shows as replacement for Fehrm since March 2022.

Although they have the same surnames, neither lead vocalists Joakim Lindbäck Eriksson and Ylva Eriksson, nor support vocalist Mats Nilsson and guitarist Pähr Nilsson are related to each other.

The members of the band dress as Viking warriors, both on stage and in most music videos. Their roles are described on the bands website as follows:

- Joakim Lindbäck Eriksson – "Battle Cries" (lead vocals)
- Ylva Eriksson – "Voice of the Valkyries" (lead vocals)
- Mats Nilsson – "Tongue of the Gods" (support vocals)
- Emil Wärmedal – "Lute of heavy thunder" (bass guitar)
- Mikael Fehrm – "Lute of lightning" (guitar / listed on the website even though not in the band anymore)
- Pähr Nilsson – "Lute of lightning" (guitar)
- Dawid Grahn – "Lute of lightning" (guitar)
- Johan Johansson – "Anvil and War Drums" (drums)

== Discography ==
=== Albums ===
- 2017: Prophecy of Ragnarök
- 2020: Emblas Saga
- 2024: Fimbulvinter

=== Singles ===
- 2018: Prophecy of Ragnarök
- 2018: Yggdrasil
- 2018: Fire Blood and Steel
- 2019: The Mead Song
- 2019: Njord
- 2019: One
- 2020: Brothers Unite
- 2022: The Other Son of Odin
- 2022: Berserkir
- 2024: Heavy Metal Viking
- 2024: Nanna's Fate
- 2024: Fimbulvinter
