= The Storyteller (band) =

Swedish power metal band

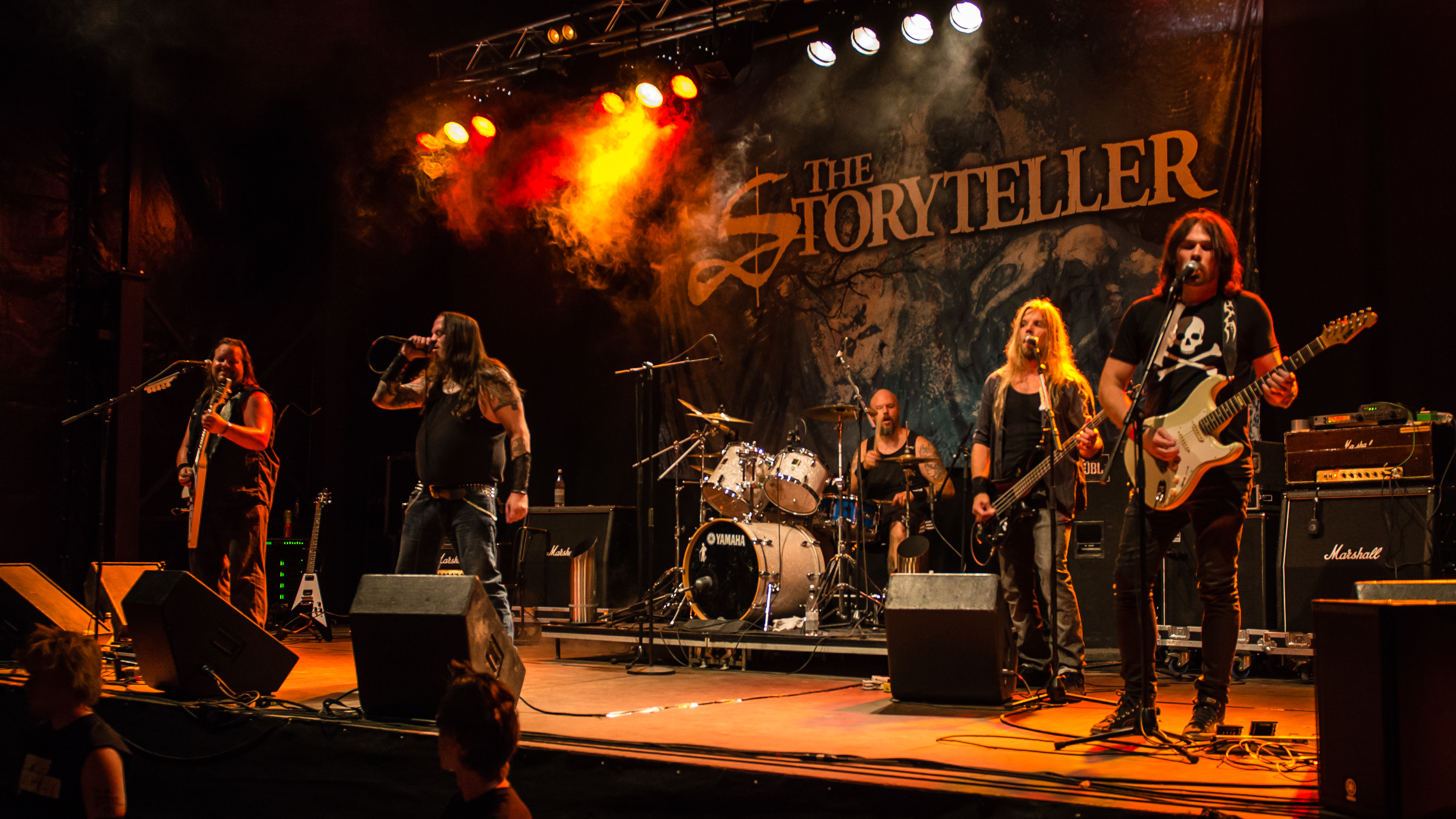

Background information
- Origin: Sweden
- Genres: Power metal
- Years active: 1995–2006; 2011–present
- Labels: No Fashion
- Members: Lars-Göran Persson; Jacob Wennerqvist; Marcus Backlund; Martin Hjerpe; Henke Branneryd
- Past members: Jocke Lundström Magnus Björk Per Nilsson Anders Östlin Lasse Martinsen Erik Gornostajev Pärka Kankanranta Johan Sohlberg Fredrik Groth Janne Björk

The Storyteller is a power metal band from Sweden formed in late 1995. The band has been on hiatus since 2006, but returned in 2011.

== Line-up ==
Current members

- Lars-Göran Persson (ex-Crystal Light, ex-Special Edition) - vocals (1995-1997, 2011–present), bass (1997–present)
- Jacob Wennerqvist (ex-Legia, ex-Crystal Light) - guitars (2001-2006, 2011–present)
- Marcus Backlund - bass (2011-2013), guitars (2013–present)
- Martin Hjerpe - drums (1997-2006, 2011–present)
- Henke Branneryd - bass (2013–present)

Previous members

- Jocke Lundström - vocals, guitars, drums (1995-1996)
- Magnus Björk (ex-Nightchant, ex-Februari 93, ex-Withered Beauty, ex-Forlorn) - vocals, guitars (1995-1996)
- Per Nilsson - guitars (1996-1997)
- Anders Östlin - bass, keyboards (1997-1997)
- Lasse Martinsen - guitars, backing vocals (1999-2000)
- Erik Gornostajev - guitars (2000-2001)
- Pärka Kankanranta (Atomkraft, ex-Karyan, Raubtier, ex-Viperine, ex-Winterlong) - guitars (2001)
- Johan Sohlberg (ACe of DC, Blue DeVilles, Coverdales, Emerald, Greystone, Special Edition, ex-Bloodbound) - bass (2003-2006)
- Fredrik Groth (Scar Symmetry (live), ex-Kryptillusion) - guitars (1995-1996, 2011–2012), keyboards (1997-2006)
- Janne Björk - bass (2002)

== Discography ==
Studio albums

- The Storyteller (2000)
- Crossroad (2001)
- Tales of a Holy Quest (2003)
- Underworld (2005)
- Dark Legacy (2013)
- Sacred Fire (2014)
- Final Stand (2025)

EPs

- Seed of Lies (2004)

Demos

- 1995 Demo (1995)
- 1996 Demo (1996)
- 1998 Demo #1 (1998)
- 1998 Demo #2 (1998)
