= Violator (band) =

Brazilian thrash metal band

Background information
- Origin: Brasília, Brazil
- Genre: Thrash metal
- Years active: 2002–2018 • 2019-present
- Label: Kill Again Records – Brazil
- Members: Pedro Arcanjo; Pedro Augusto; Márcio Cambito; David Araya
- Website: violatorthrash.com

Violator is a Brazilian thrash metal band, formed in 2002 by Pedro Arcanjo, Pedro Agusto, and David Araya. After six years in the metal underground, the band signed with Brazilian label Kill Again Records and released their debut album, Chemical Assault. Then toured Brazil and later France, Paraguay, Argentina, Chile, Peru, Uruguay, Venezuela, Japan, Belgium, Mexico, and Italy. In 2013, Violator released their third full-length studio album, Scenarios of Brutality, and, in 2017, they released their second EP, The Hidden Face of Death. In 2019, they released their first live album, Live in Beijing. Their fourth full-length studio album and first in 12 years, Unholy Retribution, was set for release on 5 September, 2025.

== History ==
The band was formed in 2002 by four musicians to add a modern layer to the established thrash metal scene.

After the live rehearsal demo Killer Instinct (2002), the compilation album Fast Food Thrash Metal, and many shows in and around Distrito Federal (Brazil), Violator traveled to Asuncion and played in Paraguay. After that, the band opened for German thrash metal group Destruction and American death metal band Malevolent Creation.

In the first months of 2004, the band signed with Kill Again Records and released the EP Violent Mosh. The release resulted in over 40 concerts in the next two years. Violator traveled through 10 Brazilian states in the Moshing With Violence Tour. One of these concerts was recorded as a DVD for the first edition of Da Tribo Rock Magazine. Violent Mosh was also the first release by the band outside Brazil. The EP was released on cassette in Bolivia by Grim Art Prods. The cassette was limited to 666 copies. In late 2005, guitarist Juan Leda left the band to continue his studies in Argentina. They played a farewell show with Finnish thrashcore band Força Macabra.

As of early 2006, Violator was a power trio. After six months of recording and editing at Orbis studio in Brasília, the band released the first full-length album, Chemical Assault. The album release was also the return of the two guitar line-up, after Márcio Cambito joined the band. The band continued playing concerts in Brazil and in South America. In 2009 they had the opportunity to play at the True Thrash Fest in Japan with Hirax, Fastkill, Abigail, Rose Rose, Riverge, Kings of Evil, Code Red, and Impaler. In 2010, Violator released their album, Annihilation Process, continuing on the typical old school thrash metal style that the group has played since it was formed. That EP was the debut in studio of Marcio Cambito. The group toured Europe in the Plunging Into Annihilation Euro Tour 2010 with the American thrashers, Fueled By Fire. The band also released several splits in 2010, Thrashing the Tyrants with Bandanos, Raging Thrash with Hirax, and True Thrash Fest, a DVD that was recorded during their presentation at the True Thrash Fest 2009, and that also includes songs of the other groups that performed on that year's fest edition.

In early 2011, Violator recorded their first official video, for the song "Futurephobia", which is part of the album Annihilation Process.

On 10 January 2018, Violator announced the suspension of its activities indefinitely due guitarist Pedro Augusto moving to Ireland. As a farewell, the band even played a show at SESC in São Paulo on 20 January and another in Cascavel, in the interior of Paraná, on 3 February of that year.

In August 2025, Violator released their first song in 12 years "The Evil Order", taken from their upcoming fourth album Unholy Retribution, due for release on 5 September.

== Band members ==
=== Current members ===
- Pedro Arcanjo – bass and vocals (2002–present)
- Pedro Augusto – guitar (2002–present)
- Marcelo Cambito – guitar (2005–present)
- David Araya – drums (2002–present)

=== Former Members ===
- Juan Lerda – guitar (2002–2005)

== Discography ==
=== Demos ===
- Killer Instinct – 2002

=== EPs ===
- Violent Mosh – 2004
- The Hidden Face of Death – 2017

=== Albums ===
- Chemical Assault - 2006
- Annihilation Process - 2010
- Scenarios of Brutality - 2013
- Unholy Retribution - 2025

=== Live Albums ===
- Live in Beijing - 2019

=== Splits ===
- Fast-Food Thrash Metal (split LP) – 2003 – With the bands Revival, Tsavo, and Temenon
- Violent War (split LP) – 2005 – With the band Bywar
- Raging Thrash (split EP) 2010 – With the band Hirax
- Thrashing the Tyrants (split LP) 2010 – With the band Bandanos

=== Contributed tracks to ===
- Thrashing Like a Maniac (compilation, 2007)
