= Martin Prahl =

Swedish singer-songwriter

- Born: 13 January 1980 (age 46)
- Occupations: Singer, songwriter

Martin Prahl (born 13 January 1980) is a singer-songwriter from Malmö, Sweden. In February 2011 he released his debut album Through the Dark, which received positive reviews The album contains classic rock inspired by artists and bands like Bruce Springsteen, Tori Amos, Pearl Jam, The Mission, Thin Lizzy, Neil Young och Arcade Fire. All the songs on "Through The Dark" were written by Prahl who also sings and plays most of the instruments on the album. The album also features singer Cecilia Salazar and drummers Povel Ohlsson (Robyn), and Tomas Erladsson (ex ACT).

Prahl and his band played their first gig at the rock club Debaser in Malmö.

Prahl is the son of football coach Tom Prahl who led the clubs Halmstads BK and Malmö FF to victory in the national football league Allsvenskan. Martin Prahl has played on the Swedish junior national team.
