= Michael Katon =

American blues-rock guitarist and vocalist

- Born: 1953 (age 71–72); Ann Arbor, Michigan, United States
- Origin: Ypsilanti, Michigan, United States
- Genres: Blues, rock
- Occupation: Guitarist
- Years active: 1980s-2000s
- Labels: Provogue Records
- Website: www.katon.com

Michael Katon (born 1953) is an American blues-rock guitarist and vocalist. He grew up in Ypsilanti, Michigan, United States, in a musical family where he was early inspired to take up the guitar.

Katon made his recording debut with his 1984 album, Boogie All Over Your Head. His album Rip It Hard continued in the traditional blues-boogie vein, and while, like many blues men, major commercial success evades Katon, he remains a respected guitarist in the field. Katon released a live album in 1996.

Valerie Potter of Metal Hammer said " Michael Katon plays some of the loudest, toughest, meanest rock & blues on the planet!". Living Blues also said of Katon: "Katon is a virtuoso guitar player with his roots in the right place...[his] sound is a blazing blend of electric blues and roadhouse boogie".

In June 2014, he was voted into the Michigan Rock and Roll Hall of Fame.

Born in Ann Arbor, Michigan, Katon now lives in Hell, Michigan.

== Discography ==
1. Boogie All Over Your Head (1984)
2. Proud To Be Loud (1988)
3. Get On the Boogie Train (1992)
4. Rip It Hard (1994)
5. Rub (1996)
6. Bustin' Up the Joint - Live (1996)
7. The Rage Called Rock 'N' Roll (2000)
8. Bad Machine (2002)
9. Michael Katon, M.K. (2006)
10. Diablo Boogie, Blues Brewed in Hell (2006)
11. Live: On the Prowl (2007)
12. Bootleg Boogie Live! (2008) (Download only)
