= ACT (Swedish band) =

Swedish progressive rock band

A.C.T
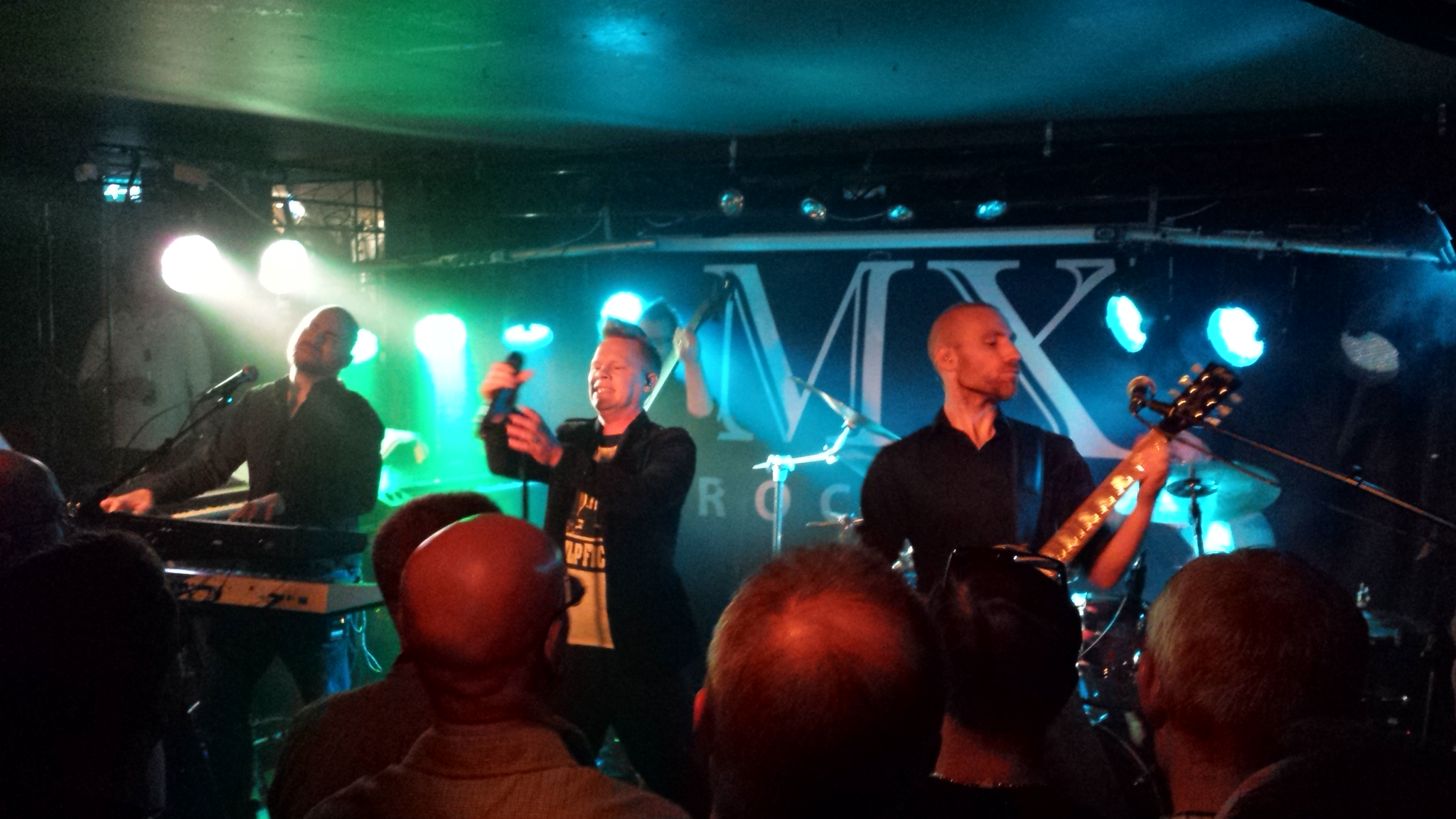
- Swedish progressive rock band A.C.T in concert. Alingsås, Sweden, 16th of April 2016

Background information
- Origin: Sweden
- Genre: Progressive rock
- Years active: 1995-present
- Labels: MTM, Atenzia Records, InsideOut, Avalon (Japan)
- Members: Ola Andersson; Peter Asp; Thomas Lejon; Jerry Sahlin; Herman Saming
- Past members: Tomas Erlandsson; Simon Nicklasson; Jens Appelgren
- Website: www.actworld.se

A.C.T (Swedish pronunciation: [ˈækt]) is a Swedish progressive rock band formed in 1995 under the name ‘Fairyland', in Malmö. The band has been through several personnel changes; with the current line-up featuring Herman Saming (vocals), Ola Andersson (guitar), Jerry Sahlin (keyboards), Peter Asp (bass), and Thomas Lejon (drums).

== History ==
Initially under Ola Andersson on guitars, Tomas Erlandsson on drums, Jens Appelgren on vocals and Jerry Sahlin on keyboards, Fairyland was started by members of a music school in Malmö. Amongst various line-up changes, Fairyland changed its name to A.C.T in 1995. In 1996, A.C.T first came into the public eye when it made its way to the final of a Swedish music competition, although it did not win.

In 1997, a new demo was recorded and the band toured extensively in Sweden. Their debut album, Today's Report, was released in 1999. Following the release of this album, A.C.T embarked on a Scandinavian tour with the progressive rock band Saga.

In 2001, the second album, Imaginary Friends, was recorded and the band went on a European tour supporting Fish.

In 2003, A.C.T's third album, Last Epic, was released and the band went on a European tour with former Genesis singer Ray Wilson.

In 2006, A.C.T signed with the label InsideOut and returned with the album Silence. InsideOut has subsequently re-released the first three albums as special editions with bonus tracks and enhanced booklets.

On December 24, 2013, the band announced on their Facebook page that their fifth album, Circus Pandemonium, will be released on February 19, 2014, in Japan, and on March 5, 2014, in Europe, USA, and iTunes.

== Personnel ==
=== Current lineup ===
- Herman Saming – lead vocals
- Ola Andersson – lead guitar, vocals
- Jerry Sahlin – keyboards, vocals
- Peter Asp – bass guitar, synthesizer, percussion
- Thomas Lejon – drums, percussion

=== Former members ===
- Jens Appelgren – vocals
- Simon Nicklasson – bass
- Tomas Erlandsson – drums

== Discography ==
=== Studio albums ===
- Today's Report (1999)
- Imaginary Friends (2001)
- Last Epic (2003)
- Silence (2006)
- Circus Pandemonium (2014)
- Falling (2023)
- Eternal Winter (2025)

=== Demos ===
- Early Recordings (1996)

=== EPs ===
- Rebirth (2019)
- Heatwave (2021)
- Falling (2023)

=== Live albums ===
- Trifles and Pandemonium (2016)
