= Art Nation =

Swedish melodic rock band

- Origin: Sweden
- Genre: Melodic rock
- Years active: 2014–present
- Label: Sony Music Entertainment
- Members: Alexander Strandell; Christoffer Borg; Richard Swärd
- Past members: Felix Borg; Theodor Hedström; Simon Gudmundsson; Sam Söderlindh; Carl Tudén; Alexander Lundgren

Art Nation is a Swedish melodic rock band from Gothenburg, founded in 2014 by Alexander Strandell and Christoffer Borg.

Their debut album Revolution was released in August 2015 by German record company Metal Heaven.

The band was nominated for one of Sweden's biggest music prizes, "Gaffa- priset", 2015, 2016, and 2017, as "The Best Live Act of the Year" and "Swedish Breakthrough of the Year" and "Swedish Group of the Year" like Zara Larsson, Ghost, Laleh, Håkan Hellström and In Flames.

The song "Look to the Sky" featured in the newspaper Aftonbladet's best-selling list 2015 and was named "Beautifulest Ballad of the Year".

In early 2016, the band signed a worldwide record contract with Sony Music Entertainment / Gain, which led to a sharp success curve in a short period of time. In mid-2016, the band was highly featured with "We Are Better Together", this year's specially written Gothia Cup song, performed during the opening ceremony at Ullevi on July 18, 2016, for an audience of 60,000. In this connection, the band also participated in SVT where the "Gothia song" was played live.

The tour summer also included many play dates at festivals, clubs and other contexts. Sweden's biggest rock magazine online, Rocknytt, praised the band through the sentence - "[Art Nation] is a magnificent show in how damn good melodic hard rock can sound in 2016!"

The group has played and shared a scene with bands and artists like Sabaton, Europe, Twisted Sister, H.e.a.t, Dokken, Takida, Stiftelsen, Måns Zelmerlöw, D-A-D, Petter and Carola.

In April 2017, Art Nation released its second album, Liberation, with a tougher and more modern sound than before.

"We wanted to broaden the boundaries and see what was possible to do to renew," says Alexander Strandell.

In autumn 2017, Christoffer Borg, Simon Gudmundsson and Carl Tudén were replaced by Sam Söderlindh, Richard Svärd and Linus Thomsson respectively. Efraim Larsson (ex-Diamond Dawn) was temporary as a drummer between July–September 2017.

== Members ==
- Alexander Strandell - vocals
- Christoffer Borg - guitar
- Richard Svärd - bass

=== Former Members ===
- Felix Borg - drums
- Johan Gustavsson - guitar
- Theodor Hedström - guitar, keyboard
- Simon Gudmundsson - bass
- Sam Söderlindh - guitar
- Linus Thomsson - drums
- Carl Tudén - drums
- Alexander Lundgren - drums

== Discography ==
=== Studio Album ===
- 2015 - "Revolution"
- 2017 - "Liberation"
- 2019 - "Transition"
- 2023 - "Inception"

=== Singles ===
- 2014 - "Moving On"
- 2014 - "One Is Better Than No One"
- 2015 - "Leave It All Behind"
- 2016 - "We Are Better Together" (The Official Gothia Cup Song)
- 2017 - "The Real Me"
- 2017 - "Ghost Town"
- 2018 - "Infected"
