= November (band) =

Swedish rock band

- Origin: Stockholm, Sweden
- Genres: Hard rock
- Years active: 1969–1972; 1993; 2007
- Labels: Sonet; Mellotronen
- Members: Björn Inge; Christer Stålbrandt; Richard Rolf
- Website: November on Myspace

November was a Swedish rock band formed in Stockholm, Sweden in 1969 by Christer Stålbrandt, Richard Rolf and Björn Inge. According to svt.se, November has been called "Sweden's first hard rock/heavy metal band."

== History ==
November was popular for playing "as fast as possible" and with many guitar solos. Although their style did not have much in common with speed metal, their music was inspired by American acid rock. A mixture of some early Uriah Heep hits like "Bird of Prey" and "Easy Livin' ", Cream and Led Zeppelin, it was heavy, and blues based. November was formed in 1968 at Tegelhögen, a youth club in Vällingby (a Stockholm suburb). Here, Christer Stålbrandt and Björn Inge, played with two friends as The Imps. After a few months, Stålbrandt left to form a new group called Train. Björn Inge joined shortly after. The Train also included Snowy White on guitar. In the early autumn of 1969, Snowy made a decision to return to his homeland, England, and Richard Rolf joined as their new guitarist.

On 1 November 1969, following their support of Peter Green's Fleetwood Mac at the Que-Club in Gothenburg, they decided to call themselves November.

November was one of the first Swedish rock bands with Swedish lyrics. Most of the lyrics were written by Stålbrandt and influenced by the 60's flower power movement. Despite the Swedish lyrics, November was quite popular in England. While touring in England the lyrics were often translated to English, the crowd, however, insisted on the band performing with Swedish lyrics.

November recorded three albums which all reached high on the Swedish charts. After their last concert at club Domino on New Year's Eve 1972, the band split up and had, up until 2007, only performed once, namely during the release party for the CD November-Live 1993 (recorded on tour in 1971) on 30 Nov 1993.

Christer Stålbrandt moved on and formed the group Saga. Björn Inge joined jazz rockers Energy and Richard Rolf was one of the forming members of Bash and later joined Nature.

On 27 January 2007, they performed at the Mellotronen 20th anniversary party. More gigs have been played since.

In Sweden, November is considered to be music legends (within smaller circles of people from the same generation), and not only in their home city Greater Stockholm.

=== November and "Progg" ===
In the early 1970s, most Swedish rock bands were in media labeled as progressive rock, which very soon became "Progg". The times, with demonstrations against the American involvement in Vietnam, wildcat strikes (with the best example at the iron-ore mine in Kiruna 1969 and the harbor workers in Gothenburg, who struck both their employers and against the common working class trade union LO (or Landsorganisationen which translates to "the Land's Organisation" or "the Country's Organisation") after Marxist and revolutionary agitation. Close to a dozen of Communist parties participated in the general elections 1968, 1970 and 1973. All tried to be "more or better communists" than all the others (Only the old VPK received enough votes for parliamentary seats though). During these times, with a very loud (but not equally large) group of red agitators, who at daily basis through radio and television reached in particular the Swedish youth. And it more or less was declared that all "Progg-music" was political and red ("standing on the working class' side"), while ABBA and dance music bands soon became the "commercial exception".

But in reality, November was far from all political bands and had not asked to be put in the "progg-category" at all. November's music is instead related to heavy instrumental rock, and bands like Cream, early Uriah Heep and Mountain.

November, like a few other bands and solo-artists, was put in the "progg-category" by media, simply for coming up at the same time, sharing the audience. Still today, November is sometimes labelled as "progg"-music (meaning independent, often raw, anti-establishment music with a strong leftist agenda), but they certainly never played political music, or agitated for any political standpoint in lyrics or in interviews. November was — thanks to acting in this era in Sweden — unavoidably loosely connected with the wider anti-Vietnam war hippie movement and liked to play hard rock fast.

== Discography ==
=== Studio albums ===
- En ny tid är här... LP Sonet Records (1970)
- 2:a November LP Sonet Records (1971)
- 6:e November LP Sonet Records (1972); reason for the "jump" from "2.November" to "6.November" is found at the album cover. It's a painting picturing The Battle of Lützen which occurred on 6 November 1632, an important date in Swedish heroic war history.
- Live CD/LP Sonet Records / Mellotronen Records (1993)

=== Singles ===
- "Mount Everest" / "Cinderella" 7" Sonet Records 1970)
- "Men mitt hjärta ska vara gjort av sten" / "Môuchkta (Drömmen om Malin)" 7" Sonet Records 1971)
- "Mount Everest" / "Nobody's Hand to Hold" 7" Sonet Records 1971)
- "Tillbaks till Stockholm" / "Sista resan" 7" Sonet Records 1971)

=== Compilation tracks ===
- "Ta ett steg in i sagans land" on The Essence of Swedish Progressive Music 1967-1979 - Pregnant Rainbows for Colorblind Dreamers Premium Records 2007)

== Band members ==
- Björn Inge - (drums, vocals)
- Christer Stålbrandt - (bass, vocals) born 2 July 1949 in Sweden. He is also a part of Clan of Society and Saga.
- Richard Rolf - (guitar)
