= Definitive Collection (Europe album) =

Greatest hits album by Europe
- Released: 30 April 1997
- Recorded: 1982–1992
- Genre: Hard rock, heavy metal, glam metal
- Length: 74:34/23:10
- Label: Epic
- Producer: Various

Europe chronology
| 1982–1992 (1993) | Definitive Collection (1997) | Super Hits (1998) |

Definitive Collection is a compilation album by Swedish rock band Europe, released on 30 April 1997 by Sony Music.

== Track listing ==
All tracks are written by Joey Tempest, except where noted.

Disc one
| No. | Title | Writer(s) | From album | Length |
|---|---|---|---|---|
| 1. | "The Final Countdown" | | The Final Countdown | 5:09 |
| 2. | "Rock the Night" | | The Final Countdown | 4:03 |
| 3. | "Carrie" | Tempest, Mic Michaeli | The Final Countdown | 4:30 |
| 4. | "Cherokee" | | The Final Countdown | 4:10 |
| 5. | "Time Has Come" | | The Final Countdown | 4:00 |
| 6. | "Heart of Stone" | | The Final Countdown | 3:46 |
| 7. | "Love Chaser" | | The Final Countdown | 3:27 |
| 8. | "On Broken Wings" | | "The Final Countdown" (B-side) | 3:43 |
| 9. | "Superstitious" | | Out of This World | 4:34 |
| 10. | "Open Your Heart" | | Wings of Tomorrow | 4:03 |
| 11. | "Let the Good Times Rock" | | Out of This World | 4:03 |
| 12. | "Sign of the Times" | | Out of This World | 4:14 |
| 13. | "Tomorrow" | | Out of This World | 3:03 |
| 14. | "Prisoners in Paradise" (single version) | | Prisoners in Paradise | 4:31 |
| 15. | "I'll Cry for You" (single version) | Tempest, Nick Graham | Prisoners in Paradise | 4:10 |
| 16. | "Halfway to Heaven" | Tempest, Jim Vallance | Prisoners in Paradise | 4:06 |
| 17. | "Break Free" | Tempest, Kee Marcello | Prisoners in Paradise (bonus track) | 4:05 |
| 18. | "Sweet Love Child" | Tempest, Marcello, Michaeli | Prisoners in Paradise (outtake); 1982–1992 | 4:57 |
| Total length: | | | | 74:34 |

Disc two "Extra-CD"
| No. | Title | Writer(s) | From album | Length |
|---|---|---|---|---|
| 1. | "In the Future to Come" | | Europe | 5:01 |
| 2. | "Seven Doors Hotel" | | Europe | 5:16 |
| 3. | "Stormwind" | | Wings of Tomorrow | 4:23 |
| 4. | "Scream of Anger" | Tempest, Marcel Jacob | Wings of Tomorrow | 4:04 |
| 5. | "Dreamer" | | Wings of Tomorrow | 4:26 |
| Total length: | | | | 23:10 |

== Personnel ==
Tracks from Europe and Wings of Tomorrow

- Joey Tempest – vocals, acoustic guitar, keyboards
- John Norum – guitar, backing vocals
- John Levén – bass guitar
- Tony Reno – drums

Tracks from The Final Countdown, including "On Broken Wings"

- Joey Tempest – vocals, acoustic guitar
- John Norum – guitar, backing vocals
- John Levén – bass guitar
- Mic Michaeli – keyboards, backing vocals
- Ian Haugland – drums, backing vocals

Tracks from Out of This World and Prisoners in Paradise, including "Break Free" and "Sweet Love Child"

- Joey Tempest – vocals, acoustic guitar
- Kee Marcello – guitar, backing vocals
- John Levén – bass guitar
- Mic Michaeli – keyboards, backing vocals
- Ian Haugland – drums, backing vocals
