= Rock the Night: The Very Best of Europe =

Greatest hits album by Europe
- Released: 3 March 2004
- Recorded: 1982–1992
- Genre: Hard rock, heavy metal, glam metal
- Length: 2:20:29
- Label: Sony Music
- Producer: Various

Europe chronology
Super Hits (1998)	Rock the Night: The Very Best of Europe (2004)	Start from the Dark (2004)

Rock the Night: The Very Best of Europe is a compilation album by Europe, which was released on 3 March 2004 by Sony Music.

Unlike 1982–1992, which was put together by vocalist Joey Tempest on his own, the track listing for Rock the Night was decided by all the members of the band.

== Track listing ==
All tracks are written by Joey Tempest, except where noted.

Disc 1
No.	Title	Writer(s)	From album/single	Length
1.	"Rock the Night"		The Final Countdown	4:05
2.	"Superstitious"		Out of This World	4:33
3.	"I'll Cry for You" (acoustic version)	Tempest, Nick Graham	Prisoners in Paradise	3:58
4.	"Cherokee"		The Final Countdown	4:11
5.	"Stormwind"		Wings of Tomorrow	4:29
6.	"Sweet Love Child"	Tempest, Kee Marcello, Mic Michaeli	Prisoners in Paradise (outtake); 1982–1992	4:57
7.	"In the Future to Come"		Europe	5:01
8.	"Here Comes the Night"		Prisoners in Paradise (outtake)	4:26
9.	"Sign of the Times"		Out of This World	4:14
10.	"Dreamer"		Wings of Tomorrow	4:26
11.	"Seventh Sign"	Tempest, Marcello, Michaeli	Prisoners in Paradise	4:41
12.	"Yesterday's News"	Tempest, Marcello, John Levén, Ian Haugland, Michaeli	Prisoners in Paradise (bonus track)	5:26
13.	"Got Your Mind in the Gutter"	Tempest, Beau Hill, Marcello	Prisoners in Paradise	4:59
14.	"Ready or Not"		Out of This World	4:05
15.	"Aphasia" (instrumental)	John Norum	Wings of Tomorrow	2:30
16.	"Time Has Come" (live at Solnahallen, Stockholm 1986)		The Final Countdown Tour 1986	4:31
Total length:				70:32

Disc 2
No.	Title	Writer(s)	From album/single	Length
1.	"The Final Countdown"		The Final Countdown	5:10
2.	"Halfway to Heaven"	Tempest, Jim Vallance	Prisoners in Paradise	4:07
3.	"Open Your Heart"		Wings of Tomorrow	4:05
4.	"A Long Time Comin'"	Tempest, Marcello	Prisoners in Paradise (bonus track)	3:55
5.	"Mr. Government Man"	Tempest, Hill	Prisoners in Paradise (bonus track)	3:36
6.	"Carrie"	Tempest, Michaeli	The Final Countdown	4:29
7.	"Seven Doors Hotel"		"Rock the Night" (B-side)	5:03
8.	"Girl from Lebanon"		Prisoners in Paradise	4:21
9.	"The King Will Return"		Europe	5:34
10.	"More Than Meets the Eye"	Tempest, Marcello, Michaeli	Out of This World	3:20
11.	"Prisoners in Paradise"		Prisoners in Paradise	5:33
12.	"Wings of Tomorrow"		Wings of Tomorrow	3:57
13.	"On Broken Wings"		"The Final Countdown" (B-side)	3:44
14.	"Scream of Anger"	Tempest, Marcel Jacob	Wings of Tomorrow	4:04
15.	"Heart of Stone"		The Final Countdown	3:46
16.	"Let the Good Times Rock" (live at Ahoy Rotterdam, 1989)			5:24
Total length:				70:08

== Personnel ==
- Joey Tempest – vocals, acoustic guitar, keyboards
- John Norum – guitar, backing vocals
- Kee Marcello – guitar, backing vocals
- John Levén – bass
- Mic Michaeli – keyboards, backing vocals
- Ian Haugland – drums, backing vocals
- Tony Reno – drums
- Nate Winger – backing vocals
- Paul Winger – backing vocals
- Elisabet Löwa – Compilation Producer & Project Coordination
- Björn Almstedt, Cutting Room – Mastering
- Henrik Jonsson, Polar Mastering – Additional Mastering
- Michael Johansson – Photography
- Jon Edergen, Electric Boogie – Artwork

== Charts ==
=== Weekly charts ===
Weekly chart performance
Chart (2004)	Peak position
Danish Albums (Hitlisten)	11
Finnish Albums (Suomen virallinen lista)	5
Norwegian Albums (VG-lista)	3
Swedish Albums (Sverigetopplistan)	2

=== Year-end charts ===
Year-end chart performance
Chart (2004)	Position
Swedish Albums (Sverigetopplistan)	54

== Certifications ==
Certifications
Region	Certification	Certified units/sales
Norway (IFPI Norway)	Gold	20,000^{*}
Sweden (GLF)	Gold	30,000^{^}
^{*} Sales figures based on certification alone.^{^} Shipments figures based on certification alone.
