= Super Hits (Europe album) =

Greatest hits album by Europe
- Released: 27 January 1998
- Recorded: 1984–1991
- Genre: Hard rock, heavy metal
- Length: 43:03
- Label: Columbia, Epic, Sony Music, Legacy

Europe chronology
Definitive Collection (1998)	Super Hits (1998)	Rock the Night: The Very Best of Europe (2004)

Professional ratings
Review scores
Source	Rating
AllMusic	4/5 stars

Super Hits is a budget-priced ten-track compilation that features Europe's two biggest hits selected by producer Bruce Dickinson (not to be confused with the Iron Maiden vocalist) "The Final Countdown" and "Carrie", but neglects the lesser-known "Rock the Night" and "Superstitious" in favor of a selection of album tracks and failed singles. The album was geared towards casual fans who want two big hits in one collection.

== Track listing ==
All songs were written by Joey Tempest, except where noted.

No.	Title	Writer(s)	From album	Length
1.	"The Final Countdown"		The Final Countdown	5:08
2.	"Sign of The Times"		Out of This World	4:14
3.	"Carrie"	Tempest, Michaeli	The Final Countdown	4:30
4.	"Cherokee"		The Final Countdown	4:12
5.	"Time Has Come"		The Final Countdown	4:00
6.	"Open Your Heart"		Wings of Tomorrow	4:08
7.	"Let the Good Times Rock"		Out of This World	4:03
8.	"Halfway to Heaven"	Tempest, Jim Vallance	Prisoners in Paradise	4:07
9.	"Tomorrow"		Out of This World	3:04
10.	"Prisoners in Paradise"	Tempest, Michaeli	Prisoners in Paradise	5:37
Total length:				43:03

== Personnel ==
- Joey Tempest – vocals (all tracks), piano on "Tomorrow", keyboards on "Open Your Heart"
- John Norum – guitar, backing vocals (tracks 1, 3–6)
- Kee Marcello – guitar, backing vocals (tracks 2, 7–10)
- John Levén – bass (all tracks)
- Mic Michaeli – keyboards, backing vocals (tracks 1–5, 7–10)
- Ian Haugland – drums, backing vocals (tracks 1–5, 7–10)
- Tony Reno – drums (track 6)
