= 1982–1992 (Europe album) =

1983 compilation album by Europe

Greatest hits album by Europe
- Released: 5 April 1993
- Recorded: 1982–1992
- Genre: Hard rock, heavy metal, glam metal
- Length: 76:15
- Label: Epic
- Producer: Various

Europe chronology
| Prisoners in Paradise (1991) | 1982–1992 (1993) | Definitive Collection (1998) |

Singles from 1982–1992
- 1. "Sweet Love Child" Released: 1993

1982–2000 re-issue cover

Professional ratings
Review scores
| Source | Rating |
|---|---|
| AllMusic | 4.5/5 stars |

1982–1992 is a compilation album by the Swedish rock band Europe, released in 1993 by Epic Records. Vocalist Joey Tempest chose the songs for this album. The album reached the top 10 in France compilation charts in April 1993.

This album contains some rarities, such as "On Broken Wings", which was the B-side for the single "The Final Countdown", and two songs from the Prisoners in Paradise sessions: "Sweet Love Child" and "Yesterday's News".

The album was reissued in 2000 as 1982–2000, including the bonus track "The Final Countdown 2000" – despite negative comment on the remix from some of the band's members.

== Track listing ==
All tracks are written by Joey Tempest, except where noted.

| No. | Title | Writer(s) | From album | Length |
|---|---|---|---|---|
| 1. | "In the Future to Come" | | Europe | 5:00 |
| 2. | "Seven Doors Hotel" | | Europe | 5:15 |
| 3. | "Stormwind" | | Wings of Tomorrow | 4:23 |
| 4. | "Open Your Heart" | | Wings of Tomorrow | 4:01 |
| 5. | "Scream of Anger" | Tempest, Marcel Jacob | Wings of Tomorrow | 4:04 |
| 6. | "Dreamer" | | Wings of Tomorrow | 4:19 |
| 7. | "The Final Countdown" | | The Final Countdown | 5:09 |
| 8. | "On Broken Wings" | | The Final Countdown (b-side) | 3:43 |
| 9. | "Rock the Night" | | The Final Countdown | 4:04 |
| 10. | "Carrie" | Tempest, Mic Michaeli | The Final Countdown | 4:30 |
| 11. | "Cherokee" | | The Final Countdown | 4:12 |
| 12. | "Superstitious" | | Out of This World | 4:33 |
| 13. | "Ready or Not" | | Out of This World | 4:03 |
| 14. | "Prisoners in Paradise" (single edit) | | Prisoners in Paradise | 4:29 |
| 15. | "I'll Cry for You" (acoustic version) | Tempest, Nick Graham | Prisoners in Paradise | 3:58 |
| 16. | "Sweet Love Child" | Tempest, Michaeli, Kee Marcello | Prisoners in Paradise (outtake) | 4:57 |
| 17. | "Yesterday's News" | Tempest, Michaeli, Marcello, John Levén, Ian Haugland | Prisoners in Paradise (outtake) | 5:27 |

Bonus track on 1982–2000 reissue
| No. | Title | Length |
|---|---|---|
| 18. | "The Final Countdown 2000" (single edit) | 3:47 |

== Personnel ==
- Joey Tempest – Vocals, acoustic guitar, keyboards (All tracks)
- John Norum – Guitars, background vocals (Tracks 1–11)
- Kee Marcello – Guitars, background vocals (Tracks 12–17)
- John Levén – Bass (All tracks)
- Mic Michaeli – Keyboards, background vocals (Tracks 7–17)
- Tony Reno – Drums (Tracks 1–6)
- Ian Haugland – Drums, background vocals (Tracks 7–17)
- Nate Winger – Background vocals (Tracks 14, 16–17)
- Paul Winger – Background vocals (Tracks 14, 16–17)
- Joey Tempest – Compilation producer
- Thomas Witt – Compilation producer
- Peter Dahl – Remastering, digital remastering
- Annmarie Gatti – Coordination
- Michael Johansson – Photography
- Denis O'Regan – Photography
- Per Hökengren – Artwork

== Charts ==
| Chart (1993) | Peak position |
|---|---|
| Dutch Albums (Album Top 100) | 18 |
| French Albums (SNEP) | 5 |
| German Albums (Offizielle Top 100) | 82 |
| Norwegian Albums (VG-lista) | 18 |
| Swedish Albums (Sverigetopplistan) | 47 |

| Chart (2008) | Peak position |
|---|---|
| Spanish Albums (Promusicae) | 82 |

== Certifications ==
| Region | Certification | Certified units/sales |
|---|---|---|
| France (SNEP) | Gold | 100,000^{*} |
| Sweden (GLF) | Gold | 50,000^{^} |
^{*} Sales figures based on certification alone.^{^} Shipments figures based on certification alone.
