= Almost Unplugged =

Live album by Europe
- Released: 17 September 2008
- Recorded: 26 January 2008 at Nalen, Stockholm, Sweden
- Genres: Rock, acoustic music
- Length: 77:42
- Labels: Hell&Back

Europe chronology
Extended Versions (2007)	Almost Unplugged (2008)	The Final Countdown: The Best of Europe (2009)

Vinyl cover
- Limited edition vinyl cover

Professional ratings
Review scores
Source	Rating
Allmusic	3/5 stars

Almost Unplugged
- Starring: Europe
- Music by: Europe
- Distributed by: Warner Home Video
- Release date: 19 August 2009
- Running time: 83 min
- Language: English

Almost Unplugged is a live album by the Swedish hard rock band Europe. It was released on CD on 17 September 2008 and on DVD on 19 August 2009.

The album was recorded at Nalen, a venue in Stockholm on 26 January 2008. The band was accompanied by a string quartet and played reworked versions of its own songs, as well as cover versions of songs by bands that have influenced Europe's sound over the years – Pink Floyd, UFO, Led Zeppelin and Thin Lizzy. The album debuted on the Swedish Album Chart at number 26, and went to number 23 the following week.

The album is dedicated to Michelle Meldrum, John Norum's late wife, who died on 21 May 2008.

== Track listing ==
1. "Got to Have Faith" (Joey Tempest, John Norum) – 4:15
2. "Forever Travelling" (Tempest, Mic Michaeli) – 4:22
3. "Devil Sings the Blues" (Tempest, Michaeli) – 6:26
4. "Wish You Were Here" (David Gilmour, Roger Waters) – 4:36
5. "Dreamer" (Tempest) – 4:23
6. "Love to Love" (Phil Mogg, Michael Schenker) – 7:31
7. "The Final Countdown" (Tempest) – 5:46
8. "Yesterday's News" (Tempest, Kee Marcello, John Levén, Ian Haugland, Michaeli) – 6:30
9. "Since I've Been Lovin' You" (Jimmy Page, Robert Plant, John Paul Jones) – 7:24
10. "Hero" (Tempest) – 4:26
11. "Suicide" (Phil Lynott) – 5:42
12. "Memories" (Tempest) – 5:51
13. "Superstitious" (Tempest) – 4:39
14. "Rock the Night" (Tempest) – 5:51

== Personnel ==
Europe

- Joey Tempest – lead vocals, acoustic guitar
- John Norum – electric & acoustic guitars
- Mic Michaeli – keyboards, backing vocals
- John Levén – bass guitar, acoustic guitar
- Ian Haugland – drums, backing vocals

Additional personnel

- Malin-My Nilsson – violin, string arrangements
- Victoria Lundell – violin
- Jonna Inge – viola
- Anna Landberg Dager – cello
- Andreas Bauman – mixing
- Henrik Jonsson – mastering
- Staffan Lindahl – tour manager / production manager
- Ronny "Rompa" Bernström – live sound engineer
- Anders "Q-lan" Wallertz – lighting designer
- Samuel "Samme" Nielsen – monitor engineer
- Peter "Peter" Erixon – backline tech
- Roger "Spy-T" Albinsson – backline tech
- Thomas Eijerstam – technical manager
- Fredrik Martinsson – web sound engineer
- Gundars Rullis – FOH technician
- Tindra Jonsson Wibers – co-ordinator
- Dimitrios Dimitriadis – cover design
