= Redux: Europe =

Studio album by Kee Marcello
- Released: November 11, 2011 (Sweden); January 13, 2012 (Worldwide)
- Genre: Hard rock
- Length: 65:46
- Label: GPM
- Producer: Kee Marcello

Kee Marcello chronology
Melon Demon Divine (2004)	Redux: Europe (2011)	Judas Kiss (2013)

Redux: Europe is the third solo album by Kee Marcello, the former guitarist in the Swedish hard rock band Europe. It was released on November 11, 2011 in Sweden and was released on January 13, 2012 worldwide. It contains the brand new title track as well as re-recordings of Europe and Easy Action tracks.

The song "Hammers Heart" is dedicated to the memory of Gary Moore. The liner notes also state that the title track was originally written for the creation of the European Union, and Kee intended for a tenor such as Luciano Pavarotti to sing it.

Redux: Europe entered the official Swedish album chart at number 32 on November 18, 2011, but remained on the chart only for a week. On February 17, 2012, the album re-entered the chart at number 9.

== Track listing ==
1. "Redux: Europe" – 3:25
2. "Superstitious" – 4:37
3. "Seventh Sign" – 4:30
4. "Let the Good Times Rock" – 4:06
5. "Girl from Lebanon" – 5:19
6. "The Final Countdown" – 5:00
7. "We Go Rocking (Slight Return)" – 4:01
8. "Carrie" – 4:32
9. "Hammers Heart" – 3:36
10. "Bumble Kee" – 1:45
11. "Here Comes the Night" – 4:28
12. "Halfway to Heaven" – 3:52
13. "More Than Meets the Eye" – 3:23
14. "Mind in the Gutter" (featuring Hanna Marcello) – 4:47
15. "Open Your Heart" – 4:07
16. "Rock the Night" – 4:18

== Personnel ==
- Kee Marcello – Guitars, lead vocals and backing vocals, keyboards
- Ken Sandin – Bass, percussion and backing vocals
- Jenna Scaramanga – Rhythm guitars
- Tim Moore – Keyboards
- Zoltan Csörsz – Drums
- Hanna Marcello – Lead vocals on track 14

Production

- Produced by Kee Marcello
- Mixed by Tobias Lindell
- Mastered by Dragan Tanaskovic at Bohus Mastering
