= Not Supposed to Sing the Blues =

Single by Europe

from the album Bag of Bones
- Released: 9 March 2012
- Length: 5:13
- Label: Gain, earMUSIC
- Songwriter(s): Joey Tempest
- Producer(s): Kevin Shirley

Europe singles chronology
"New Love in Town" (2009)	"Not Supposed to Sing the Blues" (2012)	"Firebox" (2012)

"Not Supposed to Sing the Blues" is the first single released from the Swedish rock band Europe's ninth studio album, Bag of Bones. It was released as a digital download on March 9, 2012.

== Music video ==
The music video was directed by Patric Ullaeus and it was premiered on Europe's official website on March 22, 2012.

== Track listing ==
1. "Not Supposed to Sing the Blues" – 5:13

== Personnel ==
- Joey Tempest – vocals
- John Norum – guitars
- John Levén – bass
- Mic Michaeli – keyboards
- Ian Haugland – drums
- Kevin Shirley – producer
