= Last Look at Eden =

Studio album by Europe
- Released: 9 September 2009
- Recorded: December 2008 – February 2009
- Studio: Bohus Sound Studios (Gothenburg); Playyard Studios and Studio 13 (Stockholm)
- Genre: Hard rock, blues rock
- Length: 46:55
- Label: Universal (Scandinavia) earMUSIC/Edel (Europe); JVC/Victor (Japan)
- Producer: Tobias Lindell, Europe

Europe chronology
The Final Countdown: The Best of Europe (2009)	Last Look at Eden (2009)	Bag of Bones (2012)

Singles from Last Look at Eden
- 1. "Last Look at Eden" Released: 8 June 2009; 2. "New Love in Town" Released: 3 September 2009

Last Look at Eden is the eighth studio album by the Swedish rock band Europe. It was released on 9 September 2009 in Sweden by Universal and on 14 September 2009 in the UK by Edel Music's international rock music label earMUSIC.

== Album information ==
The band has described it as a modern retro rock album. "This time, we're taking some new directions with our songs, and we're exploring different styles," they stated, "There is a definite classic rock vibe on some of the tracks... a tip of the hat to groovin', funkin' 70s rock songs – but ones we have brought into the here and now."

During an interview with the Chilean radio station Radio Universo, vocalist Joey Tempest said that "Last Look at Eden is more a Europe album than Secret Society and Start from the Dark. Last Look at Eden is a real Europe album." Drummer Ian Haugland said that Start from the Dark and Secret Society had led up to Last Look at Eden, and Tempest agreed, saying, "We had to make those two albums in order to do this."

"With the two first comeback albums [Start from the Dark and Secret Society], we were very focused on trying to modernise the sound," Tempest said in an interview with the British magazine Classic Rock, "This time we followed our hearts and soul. It's very classic-sounding and melodic. It's almost like we've gone full circle."

Europe premiered one of the album tracks, "Mojito Girl", on the Chilean tour in April 2009. Two other tracks, "Last Look at Eden" and "Gonna Get Ready", were premiered on a concert in Norway in May.

In May 2009 Europe went to Gothenburg to work with director Patric Ullaeus on the music video for the first single, "Last Look at Eden", which was released on 8 June 2009. The video was premiered on Europe's MySpace page on 3 June. In August Europe went back to Gothenburg to work with Ullaeus on the video for the second single, "New Love in Town", which was released on 3 September 2009. The video was premiered on Europe's MySpace page on 5 September.

The album debuted at number 1 on the Swedish album chart. The album was also certificated Gold in Sweden.

== Tour ==
The Last Look at Eden Tour started on 7 November 2009. Prior to this the band played at the Bloodstock Open Air festival in August 2009.

== Track listing ==
No.	Title	Writer(s)	Length
1.	"Prelude" (Instrumental)	Joey Tempest, Mic Michaeli, Tobias Lindell	0:52
2.	"Last Look at Eden"	Tempest, Andreas Carlsson	3:55
3.	"Gonna Get Ready"	Tempest, Carlsson	3:35
4.	"Catch That Plane"	Tempest	4:46
5.	"New Love in Town"	Tempest, Michaeli, Carlsson	3:33
6.	"The Beast"	Tempest, John Levén	3:23
7.	"Mojito Girl"	Tempest	3:44
8.	"No Stone Unturned"	Tempest	4:48
9.	"Only Young Twice"	Tempest, John Norum	3:51
10.	"U Devil U"	Tempest	4:10
11.	"Run with the Angels"	Tempest, Norum, Michaeli	4:03
12.	"In My Time"	Tempest, Carlsson	6:15

Limited edition digipak bonus tracks
No.	Title	Writer(s)	Length
13.	"Yesterday's News" (Live)	Tempest, Kee Marcello, Levén, Michaeli, Ian Haugland	8:25
14.	"Wake Up Call" (Live)	Tempest, Norum	4:25

Collector's edition bonus tracks
No.	Title	Writer(s)	Length
13.	"Sign of the Times" (Live)	Tempest
14.	"Start from the Dark" (Live)	Tempest, Norum

Japanese edition bonus track
No.	Title	Writer(s)	Length
13.	"Scream of Anger" (Live)	Tempest, Marcel Jacob

== Critical reception ==
Professional ratings
Review scores
Source	Rating
AllMusic	3/5 stars
Kerrang!	3/5 stars

"You can always count on good ol' Europe to supply grandiose and bombastic rock of the highest order (did any song score higher on the "arena rock-o-meter" than "The Final Countdown" back in the '80s?)," argues Greg Prato of AllMusic. "Last Look at Eden sounds exactly as you would picture a Europe album to be in 2009 – for better of for worse," he concludes his 3/5 review.

"A band who divide opinion between those who understand and those who still associate them with one novelty hit, Europe are streets ahead of most melodic rock competition, their latest album simply offering more confirmation," argues Kerrang!'s Steve Beebee (3 out of 5 Ks).

== Personnel ==
Europe

- Joey Tempest – lead and backing vocals
- John Norum – guitars
- Mic Michaeli – keyboards, backing vocals, orchestral arrangement
- John Levén – bass
- Ian Haugland – drums

Additional personnel

- Titiyo – backing vocals on tracks 4, 7, 12
- Kleerup – backing vocals on tracks 4, 7, 8, 12 and backwards piano outro on track 4
- Andreas Carlsson – backing vocals on tracks 2, 3, 5
- Magnus Sjölander – percussion
- Czech National Symphony Orchestra

Production

- Produced by Tobias Lindell and Europe
- Mixed and engineered by Tobias Lindell
- Mastered by Vlado Meller at Universal Mastering Studios, New York
- Recorded and mixed at Bohus Sound Studios, Gothenburg
- Additional production by Joey Tempest and Mic Michaeli
- Additional recordings at Playyard Studios, Stockholm by Per Stappe and Ronny Bernström; Studio 13, Stockholm by Marcus Englof

Cover art

- Art direction and design by Dimitrios Dimitriadis at Nightshade Design Collective
- Band photos by Fredrik Etoall at Etoall Production

== Charts ==
Chart (2009)	Peak position
Belgian Albums (Ultratop Flanders)	89
Czech Album Chart	45
French Albums (SNEP)	86
German Albums (Offizielle Top 100)	31
Italian Albums (FIMI)	37
Japanese Albums (Oricon)	66
Swedish Albums (Sverigetopplistan)	1
Swiss Albums (Schweizer Hitparade)	29
UK Independent Albums (OCC)	15
UK Rock & Metal Albums (OCC)	17

== Certifications ==
Region	Certification	Certified units/sales
Sweden (GLF)	Gold	20,000^{^}
^{^} Shipments figures based on certification alone.

== Release history ==
Region	Date
Sweden	September 9, 2009
United Kingdom	September 14, 2009
Germany	September 18, 2009
Japan	October 21, 2009
