= I'll Cry for You =

Single by Europe

from the album Prisoners in Paradise
- B-side: "Break Free"
- Released: December 1991
- Genre: Hard rock
- Length: 5:19
- Label: Epic
- Songwriters: Joey Tempest, Nick Graham
- Producer: Beau Hill

Europe singles chronology
"Prisoners in Paradise" (1991)	"I'll Cry for You" (1991)	"Halfway to Heaven" (1992)

"I'll Cry for You" is a song by Swedish heavy metal band Europe. It was released in December 1991 by Epic Records as the second single from the band's fifth album Prisoners in Paradise (1991), and charted at number 28 in the United Kingdom. The song was co-written by Europe vocalist Joey Tempest and former Atomic Rooster vocalist/bassist Nick Graham.

An acoustic version of "I'll Cry for You" is included on the compilations 1982–1992, 1982–2000 and Rock the Night: The Very Best of Europe.

German power metal band Edguy recorded a cover version of the song and included it as a bonus track on the single "Lavatory Love Machine" in 2004, which was released again on the 2008 compilation album, The Singles.

== Track listing ==
1. "I'll Cry for You"
2. "Break Free"

== Personnel ==
- Joey Tempest − lead vocals
- Kee Marcello − guitar, background vocals
- John Levén − bass guitar
- Mic Michaeli − keyboard, background vocals
- Ian Haugland − drums

== Charts ==
Chart (1992)	Peak position
Australia (ARIA)	179
UK Singles (OCC)	28
UK Airplay (Music Week)	31
