= Firebox (song) =

Single by Europe

from the album Bag of Bones
- Released: 18 August 2012
- Genre: Hard rock
- Length: 3:46
- Label: Gain, earMUSIC
- Songwriter(s): Joey Tempest, Mic Michaeli
- Producer(s): Kevin Shirley

Europe singles chronology
"Not Supposed to Sing the Blues" (2012)	"Firebox" (2012)	"Bring It All Home" (2013)

Music video
- "Firebox" on YouTube

"Firebox" is the second single to be released from the Swedish rock band Europe's ninth studio album, Bag of Bones. It was released as a digital download on August 18, 2012.

== Music video ==
The music video was directed by Patric Ullaeus.

== Track listing ==
1. "Firebox"

== Personnel ==
- Joey Tempest – vocals
- John Norum – guitars
- John Levén – bass
- Mic Michaeli – keyboards
- Ian Haugland – drums
- Kevin Shirley – producer
