= Bag of Bones (album) =

Studio album by Europe
- Released: 18 April 2012
- Recorded: October 2011 – February 2012 at Atlantis Grammofon AB, Stockholm
- Genre: Hard rock, blues rock
- Length: 40:55
- Label: Gain (Scandinavia) earMUSIC/Edel (Europe); Victor(Japan)
- Producer: Kevin Shirley

Europe chronology
Last Look at Eden (2009)	Bag of Bones (2012)	War of Kings (2015)

Singles from Bag of Bones
- 1. "Not Supposed to Sing the Blues" Released: 9 March 2012; 2. "Firebox" Released: August 2012

Bag of Bones is the ninth studio album by the Swedish rock band Europe. It was released on 18 April 2012 in Japan by Victor Entertainment and on April 25 in Sweden by Gain Music Entertainment. Bag of Bones is the first Europe album to chart in UK Top 100 Albums since Prisoners in Paradise in 1991 and also entered in UK Top 40 Rock Albums at number 3.

== Background and recording ==
The band decided to work with Kevin Shirley after appreciating his production on Joe Bonamassa's song "Ballad of John Henry". Before they met him, they had prepared about 12–13 songs.

Recording of the album began on 3 October 2011, and by the next day they band had recorded the first song for it, "Doghouse". By the end of the first week, they recorded two more songs. Between October 24 and October 27 they recorded overdubs and guitar solos; they officially wrapped up the album recordings on 27 October 2011. On 7 November 2011, Anton Fig came into the recording studio to record percussion on several songs on the album, while Joe Bonamassa recorded slide guitar on song "Bag of Bones". Band members were absent from the studio at this time. On November 13, Shirley finished the rough mixes of some of the songs on the album. Later on, the band decided to go in studio in early December to do some additional recordings, so that the album could be ready for Shirley to mix it in early January 2012.

Tempest plays rhythm guitar on "Not Supposed to Sing the Blues" and in the intro and breakdown on "Doghouse". He also plays twelve-string guitar on "Bag of Bones". During the recording session, the band recorded four or five takes of each song. Later, Shirley listened to all of the recorded takes and pointed out the best one to the band. After a particular take was chosen, he overdubbed a rhythm guitar from another take to obtain an acoustic impression that there are two rhythm guitars playing simultaneously. The band used old analog recording equipment from the Sixties and the Seventies, but also recorded on a computer using Pro Tools. In January, Shirley started to mix the album in his home studio and finished the mixing by February 2012.

== Composition and lyrics ==
"Riches to Rags" originates from a riff composed by John Levén. He sent the riff to Joey Tempest and the latter finished the song in a music rehearsal space he rented in Shepherd's Bush, by adding a chorus of his own and writing lyrics are about forgetting the past, moving on and re-emerging. Tempest explained: "We’re not doing that anymore, this is what we are. We are expressing ourselves exactly the way we want. This is it. We’ve moved on, we’ve crossed the line and we’ve lost our minds, this is it, take it or leave it, like it or not”, you know, that's the attitude of the song. So that's ‘Riches To Rags'".

"Requiem" is an instrumental track composed by Mic Michaeli. Michaeli placed this piece of music while the band was recording in the studio and Shirley thought it would be a good idea to record the piece as an intro. Originally, the band had titled the track "Requiem for the 80's" and planned to use it as the intro to "Riches to Rags", but in the end they decided to use it as the intro to "My Woman, My Friend" instead.

"Not Supposed to Sing the Blues" was recorded in just one take. It was written as a tribute to the Sixties and all the musician who came from small places and turned the whole world upside down. It features references to Tempest's birth year, Jimmy Page, Malcolm Young, Angus Young and Elvis Presley. Like "Riches to Rags," it was written by Tempest in the music rehearsal space in Shepherds Bush.

"Firebox" was written late during the writing process for the album. It originated from a riff composed by Michaeli. He sent the riff to Tempest, who composed the verse, chorus and solo parts and wrote lyrics later on. Michaeli plays keyboards on this song, using samples from a real sitar.

"Bag of Bones" is another song Tempest wrote in the music rehearsal space he rented in Shepherd's Bush. He wrote it on his Fender Stratocaster guitar connected to a rented Marshall amplifier. He originally came up with a nursery rhyme structure in the beginning of the song and built it from there. The lyrics are about Tempest's exhaustion, which he felt after two and a half-year of touring, and also about the 2011 England riots which started in London. Those riots are referred to in the line "My city lies in ruins". The song also features Joe Bonamassa on slide guitar.

"My Woman My Friend" originates from a bass guitar riff composed by Léven. He sent the riff to Tempest, who originally had no idea on what to do with it. Then he decided to combine the riff with an old piece of music from his archives which included a chorus and little bridge. He later wrote lyrics for it, most of which were drafted during the recording sessions. The song is about spiritual love and trials and tribulations of relationships and staying together with the same person for a long time. The song also mentions how wonderful spiritual love can be, how miraculous it can be and how disastrous it can be. On the album, Levén's riff is being played in the intro and the outro of the song by Michaeli on piano.

"Demon Head" is a Deep Purple-influenced song.

"Doghouse" is the first song written for the album.

"Drink And a Smile" is the last song written for the album, after most of it was finished. Tempest came up with a melody, Michaeli played mandolin and they came up with a stomp progression. Later, the rest of the band joined in.

"Mercy You, Mercy Me" originates from a riff composed by John Norum. He played this riff to Tempest at a rehearsal and Tempest liked it. Shirley also said it would be a great idea to build the song around that riff, but at the time the band did not have a chorus for the song, so Shirley went outside for a fifteen-minute walk. By the time he came back, Tempest and Norum had composed wrote a chorus for the song and Shirley came up with a lyric: "I heard you sing something like 'rise up'" and suggested them to use that one, but Tempest had no time to finish it. He wrote lyrics later in the rehearsal space in Shepherds Bush, which were inspired by walking on the London streets and thinking about the reasons why people are either fortunate or sad.

"Bring It All Home" originates from a jam session between Tempest and Michaeli in San Francisco in 1990; New Love in Town also originated from the same session. Tempest got the inspiration for the lyrics while watching the film The Last Waltz (1978), the idea for this song being it would be the last song on the setlist that would be performed on the last Europe show. Lyrically, it is about saying "Thank You" to all the fans and people that supported them over their career.

== Release history ==
Region	Date
Japan	April 18, 2012
Sweden	April 25, 2012
United Kingdom	April 30, 2012

== Album information ==
On 12 July 2011, Europe confirmed that Kevin Shirley would produce the album. "I've been a big fan of Europe's work for many years," said Shirley, "The band is influential and highly underrated. I can't wait to make the upcoming album their most explosive to date." The recording sessions started on 3 October 2011.

The album title was announced on 24 January 2012. Drummer Ian Haugland said, "It's not [called 'Bag of Bones'] because we all have lost tons of weight or found a new interest in archeology or dogs... It's just because it sounds fuckin' cool!"

Vocalist Joey Tempest stated, "With Bag of Bones we've made a hardcore classic rock record with the blues knocking on the door," and added, "This almost feels like a 'prequel' to our very first album, with a 2012 punch."

In addition to being released as a CD and digital download, the album was also released as an LP. Tempest said, "With the new 'Bag Of Bones' cover, there is so much detail on it. It became a bit boring there for a while; everybody was thinking, 'CDs are small, so let's just make something simple.' But we have computers, so we can blow up the cover to use for posters and vinyl, so it's still worth going that extra mile to make great covers. And we're really happy we did that."

== Reception ==
Professional ratings
Review scores
Source	Rating
AllMusic	3/5 stars
Classic Rock	4/5 stars

James Christopher Monger from AllMusic gave the album 3 stars out of 5 stating that "Bag of Bones offers up some gems in the blistering Euro debt crisis opener "Riches to Rags," the neo-prog-pop of "Firebox," and the Bad Company-meets-Cinderella balladry of the moody title cut."

== Track listing ==
No.	Title	Writer(s)	Length
1.	"Riches to Rags"	Joey Tempest, John Levén	3:05
2.	"Not Supposed to Sing the Blues"	Tempest	5:13
3.	"Firebox"	Tempest, Mic Michaeli	3:46
4.	"Bag of Bones"	Tempest	5:31
5.	"Requiem" (Instrumental)	Michaeli	0:28
6.	"My Woman My Friend"	Tempest, Levén	4:25
7.	"Demon Head"	Tempest, Levén, John Norum	3:58
8.	"Drink and a Smile"	Tempest, Michaeli	2:21
9.	"Doghouse"	Tempest	3:58
10.	"Mercy You Mercy Me"	Tempest, Norum	4:31
11.	"Bring It All Home"	Tempest, Michaeli	3:39

Japanese Bonus Track
No.	Title	Writer(s)	Length
12.	"Beautiful Disaster"	Tempest	3:57

== Personnel ==
Personnel taken from Bag of Bones liner notes.

Europe

- Joey Tempest – vocals
- John Norum – guitars
- John Levén – bass
- Mic Michaeli – keyboards
- Ian Haugland – drums

Additional personnel

- Jeff Bova – orchestration
- Joe Bonamassa – slide guitar on "Bag of Bones"
- Anton Fig – percussion

Production

- Produced by Kevin Shirley
- Mixed and engineered by Kevin Shirley

Cover art

- Design by Ulf Lundén

== Charts ==
=== Weekly charts ===
Chart (2012)	Peak position
Austrian Albums (Ö3 Austria)	30
Belgian Albums (Ultratop Flanders)	143
Belgian Albums (Ultratop Wallonia)	162
Czech Albums (ČNS IFPI)	37
Dutch Albums (Album Top 100)	44
French Albums (SNEP)	70
German Albums (Offizielle Top 100)	26
Italian Albums (FIMI)	52
Norwegian Albums (VG-lista)	21
Scottish Albums (OCC)	55
Swedish Albums (Sverigetopplistan)	2
Swiss Albums (Schweizer Hitparade)	18
UK Albums (OCC)	56
UK Independent Albums (OCC)	9
UK Rock & Metal Albums (OCC)	3

=== Year-end charts ===
Chart (2012)	Position
Swedish Albums (Sverigetopplistan)	51

== Certifications ==
Region	Certification	Certified units/sales
Sweden (GLF)	Gold	20,000^{‡}
^{‡} Sales+streaming figures based on certification alone.
