= Supergroupies =

Swedish rock band

- Origin: Gothenburg, Sweden
- Genres: Glam rock, pop
- Years active: 2001–2006
- Labels: Victor Entertainment, Livewire Cargo Rec
- Past members: Kim Simon; Leo Hansson; Micael Grimm
- Website: supergroupies.com

Supergroupies was a glam rock band from Gothenburg, Sweden. The band was formed in 2001 and have released one studio album, Supergroupies. The group consists of Kim Simon (vocals), Leo Hansson (guitar), Micael Grim (bass) and John Linden (drummer). Their album was released in Japan 2005, and in Europe the following year, 2006. The first single of the album was "Bouncin'". During the Japan tour in 2005 the group made an acoustic appearance at the Swedish embassy in Tokyo. Their producer was Kee Marcello.

== Discography ==
- 2005: Supergroupies
