= Hero (Europe song) =

Single by Europe

from the album Start from the Dark
- B-side: "Reason"
- Released: September 20, 2004
- Genre: Hard rock, heavy metal
- Length: 3:53
- Label: Sanctuary Records
- Songwriter(s): Joey Tempest
- Producer(s): Kevin Elson, Europe

Europe singles chronology
"Got to Have Faith" (2004)	"Hero" (2004)	"Always the Pretenders" (2006)

"Hero" is a 2004 single released by the Swedish heavy metal band Europe. It was released on September 20, 2004, as the second single from the band's album Start from the Dark. The song was written by vocalist Joey Tempest as a tribute to Phil Lynott, the frontman of the Irish hard rock band Thin Lizzy, and was inspired by a meeting between Tempest and Lynott.

The song's music video tells a story of aspiring young rock musicians, interspersed with clips of the band on tour. The video is a tribute to Phil Lynott.

== Personnel ==
- Joey Tempest − vocals
- John Norum − guitars
- John Levén − bass guitar
- Mic Michaeli − keyboards
- Ian Haugland − drums
