= Azalea Place =

Studio album by Joey Tempest
- Released: 25 April 1997
- Recorded: Vital Recordings, Nashville, Tennessee; Windmill Lane and Treasure Isle Studios
- Genre: Country rock
- Length: 47:13
- Label: Polar, Polydor
- Producer: Richard Dodd

Joey Tempest chronology
A Place to Call Home (1995)	Azalea Place (1997)	Joey Tempest (2002)

Singles from Azalea Place
- 1. "The Match" Released: 17 March 1997; 2. "The One in the Glass" Released: 12 May 1997; 3. "If I'd Only Known" Released: 1997

Azalea Place is the second solo album by Joey Tempest, the vocalist in the Swedish hard rock band Europe. It was released on 25 April 1997.

"After my first solo album I went out to the States to work with Richard Dodd - who's this English guy living out in Nashville – on the second one, which kept me away from home for a long time," Tempest said in an interview, "But it was something that I needed to do, I had to get it out of my system."

== Track listing ==
1. "The Match" – 3:53 (Joey Tempest, Chris Difford)
2. "If I'd Only Known" – 3:54 (Joey Tempest, Steve Diamond, Richard Dodd)
3. "The One in the Glass" – 3:20 (Joey Tempest, Janet Zuckerman)
4. "Dance for You" – 3:12 (Joey Tempest)
5. "Not Welcome Any More" – 3:53 (Joey Tempest)
6. "Losing You Again" – 4:21 (Joey Tempest, Kent Lavoie)
7. "Revolution of Love" – 4:08 (Joey Tempest)
8. "Better Than Real" – 3:31 (Joey Tempest)
9. "If We Stay Or If We Go" – 4:02 (Joey Tempest, Will Jennings)
10. "In Confidence" – 4:27 (Joey Tempest)
11. "Further from the Truth" – 4:01 (Joey Tempest, Kent Lavoie)
12. "Lucky" – 4:29 (Joey Tempest)

== Personnel ==
- Joey Tempest – Lead vocals, guitars, bass
- Siobhan Maher – Spanish vocals on "Revolution of Love"
- Reggie Young, Staffan Astner – Guitars
- Tony Harrell – Keyboards
- Greg Morrow, Tom Harding, Craig Crampf, Brian Barnett – Drums

== Album credits ==
- Richard Dodd - Producer, engineer, arrangements
- Jack Grochmal - Engineer
- James Baur - Assisting engineer
- Dan Leffler - Engineer on "If I'd Only Known"
- Joey Tempest - Arrangements
- George Marino - Mastering
- Staffan Astner - Additional arrangements
- Kristin Wilkinson - Strings arrangements
- Martina Hoogland Ivanow - Photography
- Martin Renck - Cover design
