= Walk the Earth =

Studio album by Europe
- Released: 20 October 2017
- Recorded: April–May 2017
- Studios: Abbey Road Studios, London
- Genres: Hard rock, heavy metal
- Length: 40:54
- Labels: Hell & Back; JVC (Japan)
- Producer: Dave Cobb

Europe chronology
War of Kings (2015)	Walk the Earth (2017)	Come This Madness (2026)

Singles from Walk the Earth
- 1. "Walk the Earth" Released: 1 September 2017

Walk the Earth is the eleventh studio album by the Swedish rock band Europe. It was released on 20 October 2017. The album was produced by Dave Cobb and recorded at Abbey Road Studios in London.

== Background ==
The album was recorded in Abbey Road Studios in London over a period of two weeks. The band entered the studio with ten songs and produced them with Dave Cobb. The song "GTO" originates from a riff composed by John Norum. The band was looking for an up-tempo song for the album, so Norum presented his idea for the riff. He worked on that riff with Cobb in the studio and later Joey Tempest co-wrote the lyrics with Cobb. Lyrically, it became a song about cars, love of the road and freedom. Musically, it was influenced by Deep Purple, particularly by their 1972 hit "Highway Star". The song "Pictures" originates from an idea that Tempest had in mind for some years. He had half of the verse in his head for a while and, a few weeks before the final rehearsal, while at his parents' house, he wrote the second part of the verse. After that, he presented it to the band and producer and they all loved it because it was different. Lyrically, the song is a sequel to the band's 1986 hit "The Final Countdown". The band co-wrote it with musician Aaron Raitiere, a friend of Cobb's from Nashville; Tempest wrote the lyric about what happened to the people who left the ground in 1986 and headed for Venus. "Wolves" is a political song about a whistleblower who had to move away with his family because he told the truth about something; the lyrics mention metaphorical wolves, which are hounding him in a situation where nobody trusts anybody. The intro to the song was done with an old recording technique on an old tape recorder; Tempest's vocal range and the arrangements are also different from the rest.

Tempest originally had in mind for a band to do a concept album, but after a while he realised that Europe is a rock band after all, so he and the band decided to have every song unfold in the studio, where they wrote and arranged everything together. Joey originally wanted to do some research, so he met a college professor to learn from him about how democracy as we see it today came to be, where and how and when it happened at different points of time. However, Tempest's research was limited and just a few songs touched upon political themes, namely "The Siege", "Kingdom United", "Wolves" and "Election Day". The song "The Siege" is about the events in the French Revolution, when Napoleon started to defeat the aristocrats, marking the start of democracy started France. "Election Day" is an observational song about elections going on simultaneously in the United States and England. Chris Difford, from the band Squeeze, helped Tempest co-write the lyrics on "Election Day" and "Kingdom United". The song "Turn to Dust" musically originates from an idea by keyboardist Mic Michaeli. The band had tried to work it out for each of their previous albums, but this time Tempest actually managed to push the band to finish the song. The song title is also Michaeli's idea. Lyrically, the song is warning people to not waste their time. Tempest explained: "I may have forgotten to send those letters and say those words to people I know, but there's still a chance to do it. It was a great ending to the album". On the album, the song ends abruptly in the very middle on the main riff [in a style vaguely reminiscent of the ending to The Beatles' 1969 song "I Want You (She's So Heavy)]", and it is followed by a very short instrumental track with no title, also by Michaeli, which sounds like it was recorded in the 1930s. "Walk the Earth" is a positive rebirth song.

"Kingdom United" is the first song that was written for the album. Tempest's original demo for it, where Tempest, unusually, played only drums, was called "Path of Democracy" and it was quite naive and chaotic compared to the more straightforward groovy version on the album. The song was put together in two main parts; the main riff part and the guitar solo in the outro. During the rehearsal, the working title of the song was changed to "ProgLizzy" and it became the starting point for the entire album, as it came from a more "progressive" attitude and, lyrically, it fit in with the democracy theme. While the band was in the studio recording the song, Cobb suggested adding an instrumental section played on a Mellotron keyboard after each verse. At an early stage, while the song was still called "Path of Democracy", Tempest had in mind to do a concept album where every song touched upon democracy. After the arrangements were done in the studio, Tempest contacted Difford and explained him that he wanted to write lyrics with him about the historical time in the United Kingdom when Magna Carta was created, written and signed and when democracy started in United Kingdom. While Tempest and Difford were writing the lyrics, songwriter and guitarist Boo Hewerdine, a friend of Difford's, was staying at Difford's place house and also helped adding a few lines to the lyrics. "Haze", like "GTO", is a song that originates from a riff composed by John Norum. The band worked on it in their rehearsal studio in Stockholm. After they came to Abbey Road Studio, Cobb helped take the song to a different level with his ideas for arrangement, effects and production. It is also the first time that the band included a drum solo into a song. The lyrics were written by Cobb and Tempest around a grand piano in Abbey Road's Studio 3. They gave the lyrics a psychedelic feel because of the chords and the vibe of the song. "Whenever You're Ready" originates from an up-tempo riff composed by Tempest in his studio in London. They worked on the song in their rehearsal studio in Stockholm. Later, in the main studio, Cobb added an instrumental section after every verse, which made the song flow in a different way. The lyrics were written by Tempest and Aaron Raitiere as a straightforward rock song.

== Album cover ==
The album cover features original artwork by Los Angeles artist Mike Sportes, from the Filth Mart design group. A few days into the recording of the album, Dave Cobb came one day into the studio wearing a t-shirt with one of Sportes's designs on it. The band members were impressed by the design; they contacted Sportes and asked him if he was interested in designing the album cover. After he agreed, they sent him the lyrics and the titles of the songs as well as their thoughts about covers they liked, including Pink Floyd album covers. Sportes sent the artwork back to the band and they tweaked it a little bit. Joey Tempest later explained the album cover: "For us, it just worked so well, this character walking into some sort of light or another place. I loved the grid on there, like walking the mountains, the earth and the sky. And the triangle which we have used for so many things, it's a beautiful symbol. We love the triangle. During 'The Final Countdown' tour we had three triangles above us when we played and on the flip side of 'The Final Countdown' album and on 'Prisoners In Paradise' we had a triangle".

== Track listing ==
No.	Title	Writer(s)	Length
1.	"Walk the Earth"	Joey Tempest; Dave Cobb; Mic Michaeli; Aaron Raitiere	4:15
2.	"The Siege"	Tempest; Cobb; Michaeli; Chris Difford; John Levén	4:00
3.	"Kingdom United"	Tempest; Cobb; Difford; Boo Hewerdine	2:51
4.	"Pictures"	Tempest; Cobb; Raitiere	4:48
5.	"Election Day"	Tempest; Cobb; Michaeli; Difford; Adam Lamprell	4:06
6.	"Wolves"	Tempest; Cobb; John Norum	3:55
7.	"GTO"	Tempest; Cobb; Norum	3:29
8.	"Haze"	Tempest; Cobb; Norum; James Fucci	3:49
9.	"Whenever You're Ready"	Tempest; Cobb; Raitiere	2:51
10.	"Turn to Dust" (including a hidden instrumental track)	Tempest; Michaeli; Raitiere	6:50
Total length:			40:54

== Personnel ==
Personnel taken from Walk the Earth liner notes.

Europe

- Joey Tempest – lead vocals
- John Norum – guitars
- John Levén – bass
- Mic Michaeli – keyboards
- Ian Haugland – drums

Additional musicians

- Kevin Kirs-Verstege – cello on "Turn to Dust"
- Norwegian Blue Mass Choir on "Turn to Dust"
- Jamie Larsson – additional background vocals on "Walk the Earth"

Production

- Dave Cobb – producer, mixing
- Eddie Spear – engineer, mixing
- Peter Lyman – mastering
- Toby Hulbert – assistant engineer
- Matt Mysko – assistant engineer
- Jack Fairbrother – assistant engineer
- Jack Mills – assistant engineer
- Peter Stappe – guitar overdub recording
- Max Lorentz – Hammond B3 recording

Artwork

- Mike Sportes – design

== Charts ==
Chart (2017)	Peak position
Austrian Albums (Ö3 Austria)	28
Belgian Albums (Ultratop Flanders)	75
Belgian Albums (Ultratop Wallonia)	109
Czech Albums (ČNS IFPI)	23
Finnish Albums (Suomen virallinen lista)	31
French Albums (SNEP)	62
German Albums (Offizielle Top 100)	40
Italian Albums (FIMI)	43
Japanese Albums (Oricon)	46
Japanese Hot Albums (Billboard Japan)	93
Japanese Top Albums Sales (Billboard Japan)	43
Norwegian Albums (VG-lista)	38
Scottish Albums (Official Charts)	43
Spanish Albums (Promusicae)	23
Swedish Albums (Sverigetopplistan)	2
Swiss Albums (Schweizer Hitparade)	20
UK Albums (Official Charts)	69
UK Independent Albums (Official Charts)	3
UK Rock & Metal Albums (Official Charts)	3
