= More Than Meets the Eye (song) =

Single by Europe

from the album Out of This World
- B-side: "Let the Good Times Rock"
- Released: 21 March 1989 (JPN)
- Genre: Glam metal, hard rock
- Length: 3:20
- Label: Epic
- Songwriters: Joey Tempest, Kee Marcello, Mic Michaeli
- Producer: Ron Nevison

Europe singles chronology
"Let the Good Times Rock" (1989)	"More Than Meets the Eye" (1989)	"Sign of the Times" (1989)

"More Than Meets the Eye" is a 1989 single released by the Swedish rock band Europe. It was the fourth single released from the band's fourth studio album Out of This World. It was only released in France, Spain and Japan.

The song was co-written by Europe vocalist Joey Tempest, guitarist Kee Marcello and keyboardist Mic Michaeli.

== Track listing ==
1. "More Than Meets the Eye"
2. "Let the Good Times Rock"

== Personnel ==
- Joey Tempest − lead vocals
- Kee Marcello − guitars, background vocals
- John Levén − bass guitar
- Mic Michaeli − keyboards, background vocals
- Ian Haugland − drums, background vocals
