= Kee Marcello's K2 =

Swedish hard rock band

Kee Marcello's K2 is a Swedish hard rock band that was originally the solo project of former Europe guitarist Kee Marcello. The other members were bassist Klatuu (later revealed as an alias for Kee Marcello) and former King Diamond drummer Snowy Shaw. The first album, Melon Demon Divine, was released on Frontier Records in 2004. From the first tour Ken Sandin, former bass player of Alien and Transport League, joined the band 10 years ago. In 2009, drummer Mike Terrana (from Rage, Yngwie Malmsteen and Tarja Turunen), and Marco Mendoza (from Thin Lizzy and Whitesnake) joined the band for their first European tour with this lineup. A new album is said to be released in the first quarter of 2010.

== Discography ==
- Melon Demon Divine (2004)
