= Start from the Dark =

Studio album by Europe
- Released: 22 September 2004
- Recorded: 2004
- Studio: Studios 301 (Stockholm), Little Big Room (Stockholm)
- Genre: Hard rock
- Length: 48:33
- Label: Sanctuary; Sony Music
- Producer: Kevin Elson, Europe

Europe chronology
Rock the Night: The Very Best of Europe (2004)	Start from the Dark (2004)	The Final Countdown Tour 1986 (2004)

Singles from Start from the Dark
- 1. "Got to Have Faith" Released: 15 September 2004; 2. "Hero" Released: 20 September 2004

Professional ratings
Review scores
Source	Rating
AllMusic	3.5/5 stars

Start from the Dark is the sixth studio album by the Swedish rock band Europe. It was released on 22 September 2004 by Sanctuary Records. It was the band's first release since reforming in 2003, the first original album of all-new material since 1991's Prisoners in Paradise, and the first album to feature the band's original guitarist John Norum since 1986's The Final Countdown.

Start from the Dark departs from the glam metal genre and featured a more modern sound compared to Europe's first two albums. "We wanted to be doing something at least that was a little bit relevant now; bit of a dry mix, detuned a bit," vocalist Joey Tempest said, "So we felt like we didn't want to do an '80s album per se, we just wanted to start like a fresh band really." Eventually, the album sold in excess of 600,000 copies worldwide.

== Track listing ==
All tracks are written by Joey Tempest and John Norum, except where noted.

No.	Title	Writer(s)	Length
1.	"Got to Have Faith"		3:10
2.	"Start from the Dark"		4:12
3.	"Flames"	Tempest	3:55
4.	"Hero"	Tempest	4:15
5.	"Wake Up Call"		4:14
6.	"Reason"	Tempest, Mic Michaeli	4:37
7.	"Song No. 12"		4:09
8.	"Roll with You"		4:30
9.	"Sucker"	Tempest	3:42
10.	"Spirit of the Underdog"	Tempest	4:25
11.	"America"	Tempest	3:35
12.	"Settle for Love"		3:49

== Personnel ==
Band

- Joey Tempest – vocals, acoustic guitars
- John Norum – guitars
- John Levén – bass
- Mic Michaeli – keyboards
- Ian Haugland – drums

Others

- Marcus Michaeli – additional beats
- Europe – producer
- Kevin Elson – producer, mixing
- Tom Size – engineer
- Bob Ludwig – mastering
- Niklas Bernstone – photography
- Niklas Brodd – art direction and graphic production
- Thomas Krebs – art direction and graphic production

== Charts ==
Chart (2004)	Peak position
Dutch Albums (Album Top 100)	86
French Albums (SNEP)	114
Italian Albums (FIMI)	65
Swedish Albums (Sverigetopplistan)	2
Swiss Albums (Schweizer Hitparade)	91
