= A Place to Call Home (album) =

Studio album by Joey Tempest
- Released: 20 April 1995
- Genre: Country rock
- Length: 47:25
- Label: Polar, Polydor
- Producer: Dan Sundquist

Joey Tempest chronology
A Place to Call Home (1995)	Azalea Place (1997)

Singles from A Place to Call Home
- 1. "A Place to Call Home" Released: 1995; 2. "Under the Influence" Released: 19 June 1995; 3. "We Come Alive" Released: 2 October 1995; 4. "Don't Go Changin' on Me" Released: 1996

Professional ratings
Review scores
Source	Rating
AllMusic	2/5 stars

A Place to Call Home is the first solo album by Joey Tempest, the vocalist in the Swedish hard rock band Europe. It was released on 20 April 1995 and presented a different sound compared to Europe.

"I needed a change from the Europe sound," Tempest said in an interview, "I wanted to prove myself as a singer/songwriter for sure, but for me it was more of a journey to learn about making music. I went to see a lot of new young artists .. got into stuff like Van Morrison and Bob Dylan."

Europe guitarist John Norum made a guest appearance on the song "Right to Respect".

== Track listing ==
All written by Joey Tempest.

1. "We Come Alive" – 4:48
2. "Under the Influence" – 4:41
3. "A Place to Call Home" – 3:42
4. "Pleasure and Pain" – 3:55
5. "Elsewhere" – 3:56
6. "Lord of the Manor" – 3:46
7. "Don't Go Changin' on Me" – 3:26
8. "Harder to Leave a Friend Than a Lover" – 3:49
9. "Right to Respect" – 2:50
10. "Always a Friend of Mine" – 4:01
11. "How Come You're Not Dead Yet" – 4:29
12. "For My Country" – 3:50

== Personnel ==
- Joey Tempest – lead vocals, guitars
- Jonas Isacsson, Staffan Astner, Jesper Lindberg, John Norum – guitars
- Dan Sundquist – guitars, bass, piano
- Svante Henryson, Sven Lindvall – bass
- Mats Asplen – organ
- Nicci Wallin, Per Lindvall, Christer Jansson – drums

== Album credits ==
- Dan Sundqvist – producer
- Alar Suuma – mixing
- Pontus Olsson – mixing on tracks 3 and 7, engineer
- Nick Hopkins – engineer
- Robert Wellerfors – mastering
- Dan Håfström – production assistant
- Joel Berg – art direction
- John Scarisbrick, Per Zennström – photography
