= Judas Kiss (album) =

Studio album by Kee Marcello
- Released: April 5, 2013
- Genre: Hard rock
- Length: 58:07
- Label: 7hard

Kee Marcello chronology
Redux: Europe (2011)	Judas Kiss (2013)

Judas Kiss is the fourth solo album by Kee Marcello, the former guitarist in the Swedish hard rock band Europe. It was released on April 5, 2013.

== Track listing ==
1. "Zombie" – 3:56
2. "Dog Eat Dog" – 4:02
3. "Starless Sky" – 4:49
4. "I'm Stoned" – 4:22
5. "Dead End Highway" – 5:04
6. "Judas Kiss" – 4:24
7. "And Forever More" (featuring Liv Moon) – 4:29
8. "Coming Home" – 4:43
9. "Get On Top" – 4:38
10. "The Harder They Come" – 3:08
11. "Dead Give Away" – 5:05
12. "Love Will Tear Us Apart" (cover Joy Division) – 4:24
13. "Metal Box" – 5:03

== Personnel ==
- Kee Marcello - vocals and guitars
- Mike Terrana - drums
- Ken Sandin - bass
