= New Love in Town =

- Single cover

Single by Europe

from the album Last Look at Eden
- Released: 3 September 2009 (Scandinavia); 2 October 2009 (Europe); 24 January 2010 (UK)
- Genre: Rock, hard rock
- Label: earMUSIC
- Songwriter(s): Joey Tempest, Mic Michaeli, Andreas Carlsson, Europe
- Producer(s): Tobias Lindell, Europe

Europe singles chronology
"Last Look at Eden" (2009)	"New Love in Town" (2009)	"Not Supposed to Sing the Blues" (2012)

"New Love in Town" is a hard rock ballad, that was the second single released from the Swedish heavy metal band Europe's eighth studio album, Last Look at Eden. The single was released as a digital download on 3 September 2009. It was written about Joey Tempest's son's birth.

In August 2009, Europe went to Gothenburg to work with director Patric Ullaeus on the video for the single. The video was premiered on Europe's MySpace page on 5 September 2009.

== Track listing ==
=== UK maxi single ===
1. "New Love in Town" (Joey Tempest, Mic Michaeli, Andreas Carlsson, Europe) – 3:33
2. "The Beast" (Joey Tempest, John Levén, Europe) – 3:23
3. "Last Look at Eden" [live] (Joey Tempest, Andreas Carlsson, Europe) – 4:49

== Personnel ==
- Joey Tempest – vocals
- John Norum – guitars
- John Levén – bass
- Mic Michaeli – keyboards
- Ian Haugland – drums
- Tobias Lindell – producer
- Dimitrios Dimitriadis – art direction

== Chart positions ==
Chart (2009)	Peak position
Swedish Singles Chart	15
