= Got to Have Faith =

Single by Europe

from the album Start from the Dark
- B-side: "Settle for Love"
- Released: September 15, 2004
- Genre: Heavy metal, hard rock
- Length: 3:10
- Label: Sony
- Songwriter(s): Joey Tempest, John Norum
- Producer(s): Kevin Elson, Europe

Europe singles chronology
"The Final Countdown 2000" (1999)	"Got to Have Faith" (2004)	"Hero" (2004)

"Got to Have Faith" is a 2004 single released by the Swedish heavy metal band Europe. It was released on September 15, 2004, and was the first single from the album Start from the Dark.

"Got to Have Faith" was co-written by vocalist Joey Tempest and guitarist John Norum, and was the first song written for Start from the Dark. "We wanted to make something modern, heavy and something that would be relevant now," Tempest said, "So John sent me some riffs to my hometown in London and I just started putting things together, writing lyrics and when I felt I had something, I sent it off to the other guys. They were all like, 'This is great!'... Hence the heavier riffs, the D-tuning and everything because that's the way John likes to do it."

The song's music video features the band performing in a garage interspersed with clips taken from the Ghost Rider motorcycle stunt films. In an interlude, the video shows brief, distorted clips of the band taken from the 1980s. Ghost Rider, touching speeds over 300 km/h (186 mph), zooms past Upplands Väsby, the Swedish suburb where the band was formed, at the end of the video.

== Personnel ==
- Joey Tempest − vocals
- John Norum − guitars
- John Levén − bass guitar
- Mic Michaeli − keyboards
- Ian Haugland − drums

== Chart positions ==
Chart (2004)	Peak position
Swedish Singles Chart	21
