= Joey Tempest (album) =

Studio album by Joey Tempest
- Released: 21 October 2002
- Recorded: DeadMono Studios, Stockholm; The Old Schoolhouse, London
- Genre: Hard rock
- Length: 51:04
- Label: Sonet, Universal
- Producer: DeadMono

Joey Tempest chronology
Azalea Place (1997)	Joey Tempest (2002)

Singles from Joey Tempest
- 1. "Forgiven" Released: 14 October 2002

Joey Tempest is the third solo album by Joey Tempest, lead singer of the Swedish hard rock band Europe. It was released on 21 October 2002. Three songs were cowritten by Europe keyboardist Mic Michaeli.

== Track listing ==
1. "Forgiven" – 4:00 (Joey Tempest / Malcolm Pardon / Fredrik Rinman)
2. "Loved by Me" – 3:46 (Tempest / Pardon / Rinman / Mic Michaeli)
3. "Sometimes" – 3:57 (Tempest / Pardon / Rinman / Adam Lamprell / Kajsa Ribbing)
4. "Losers" – 3:10 (Tempest / Lamprell)
5. "Superhuman" – 3:38 (Tempest / Lamprell)
6. "Always on the Run" – 3:32 (Tempest / Pardon / Rinman / Lamprell)
7. "Outside Heaven" – 3:56 (Tempest / Pardon / Rinman)
8. "Magnificent" – 2:20 (Tempest / Lamprell)
9. "Dreamless" – 3:37 (Tempest / Michaeli)
10. "Every Universe" – 4:10 (Tempest / Chris Difford)
11. "Falling Apart" – 3:39 (Tempest / Pardon / Rinman / Ribbing)
12. "Don't Change" – 3:23 (Tempest / Michaeli)
13. "Kill for a Girl Like You" [bonus track] – 4:08
14. "Kicking Around" [bonus track] – 3:41

== Personnel ==
- Joey Tempest – lead vocals, guitars, bass
- Adam Lamprell – guitars
- Malcolm Pardon – guitars, bass
- Fredrik Rinman – guitars, keyboards
- Jörgen Wall – drums

Production

- DeadMono – producer
- Ronny Lahti – mixing, additional recordings
- Ted Jensen - mastering
- WalseCustomDesign - sleeve
- Peter Alendahl/Skarp - photography
