= Tonårsdrömmar =

Studio album by Noice
- Released: 30 October 1979
- Recorded: 23 May 1979 (first recording session)
- Genre: Pop rock, punk rock, power pop
- Length: 33:03
- Label: Sonet Grammofon
- Producer: Noice, Peter Lindroth

Noice chronology
Tonårsdrömmar (1979)	Bedårande barn av sin tid (1980)

Tonårsdrömmar (English: Teenage dreams) is the debut album by the Swedish rock band Noice, released on 30 October 1979. The band was allowed to record the single, Television/Du é inte man in the Rock -79 talent show, and was later allowed to record the album that would stay on the Swedish albums chart for 18 weeks, peaking at no. 2 in 1980.

The album was rereleased on CD in 1993. The album is one of the titles in the 2009 book Tusen svenska klassiker.

== Track listing ==
Side one

All tracks are written by Peo Thyrén except where noted

1. "I natt é hela stan vår" - 2:29
2. "En kväll i tunnelbanan" - 3:54
3. "Jag vill inte va' (som alla andra)" - 2:07 (Robert Liman)
4. "Nina" - 3:08 (Hasse Carlsson)
5. "Du é inte man" - 3:37

Side two

1. "Television" - 3:22
2. "Rock 'n' roll å droger" - 2:41
3. "Jag kommer inte in" - 2:44 (Thyrén, Liman)
4. "Jag är trött på tonårsdrömmen" - 1:56
5. "Din tid kommer också" - 2:46 (Carlsson)
6. "Nu bryter jag upp" - 4:23 (Thyrén, Carlsson)

== Personnel ==
- Hasse Carlsson - vocals, guitar
- Peo Thyrén - bass guitar
- Freddie Hansson - keyboards
- Robert Klasen - drums

== Chart positions ==
Chart (1980–1981)	Peak position
Sweden (Sverigetopplistan)	2
