= Melon Demon Divine =

Melon Demon Drive

Studio album by Kee Marcello's K2
- Released: 2004
- Genre: Hard rock, glam metal
- Length: 69:05
- Label: Frontiers
- Producer: Kee Marcello

Kee Marcello's K2 chronology
Shine On (1995)	Melon Demon Drive (2004)	Redux: Europe (2011)

Melon Demon Divine is the second solo album by Kee Marcello, the former guitarist in the Swedish hard rock band Europe.

== Track listing ==
1. "Pre-Fix" – 0:29
2. "E.M.D." – 4:37
3. "Enemies" – 4:32
4. "Blood" – 4:56
5. "Epic" – 4:36
6. "Raptor" – 4:38
7. "If" – 5:37
8. "Falling Apart" – 4:25
9. "Hey Romeo" – 3:33
10. "Evil Ways" – 3:52
11. "Tattoo for Patto" – 3:37
12. "Comin' Home" – 5:32
13. "Ride On" – 5:38
14. "Can I B the 1" – 3:33
15. "Raptor" [instrumental] – 9:24

== Personnel ==
- Kee Marcello – Lead vocals, guitars
- Snowy Shaw – drums
- Klaatu - bass
- Martin Powell - keyboards

== Album credits ==
- Kee Marcello – producer
