= Shine On (Kee Marcello album) =

Studio album by Kee Marcello
- Released: 1995
- Genre: Country rock
- Length: 54:00
- Label: CNR
- Producer: Magnus Persson, Kee Marcello

Kee Marcello chronology
Shine On (1995)	Melon Demon Divine (2004)

Shine On is the first solo album by Kee Marcello, the former guitarist in the Swedish hard rock band Europe.

== Track listing ==
All songs written by Kee Marcello, except where noted.

1. "When the Rain Comes Falling" – 4:01
2. "Shine On" – 4:00
3. "Sweet Little Sister" – 4:32 (Kee Marcello, Fredrik von Gerber, Nestor Geli)
4. "Rough Ride to Paradise" – 4:16
5. "La Liaison" – 4:35
6. "Tonight Belongs to Us" – 4:26
7. "Credo (I Believe)" – 5:33 (Kee Marcello, Nestor Geli)
8. "The Wind Cries Your Name" – 4:48
9. "The River of Karma" – 4:33 (Kee Marcello, Nestor Geli)
10. "Fine Line" – 5:00 (Kee Marcello, Nestor Geli)
11. "Together Alone" – 8:16 (Kee Marcello, Nestor Geli)

== Personnel ==
- Kee Marcello – Lead vocals, guitars
- Johan Lyndström – Guitars
- Svante Henryson – Bass
- Mats Asplén – Keyboards
- Magnus Persson – Drums

== Album credits ==
- Magnus Persson - Producer
- Kee Marcello - Producer
