= Dreamer (Europe song) =

Single by Europe

from the album Wings of Tomorrow
- B-side: "Lyin' Eyes"
- Released: April 1984
- Length: 4:27
- Label: Hot Records
- Songwriter(s): Joey Tempest
- Producer(s): Leif Mases

Europe singles chronology
"Lyin' Eyes" (1984)	"Dreamer" (1984)	"Stormwind" (1984)

"Dreamer" is a 1984 song by the Swedish heavy metal band Europe. It was the second single from the Wings of Tomorrow album. The single was only released in Japan. It bears a strong resemblance to the hit single "Carrie" that was released two years later. This song is referenced in the song "Time Has Come" off the band's next album The Final Countdown in the lyric, "Pray for the dreamer/He's still so sad." In 1993 the song was included on their greatest hits compilation 1982–1992.

== Track listing ==
1. "Dreamer"
2. "Lyin' Eyes"

== Personnel ==
- Joey Tempest − lead vocals, keyboards
- John Norum − guitars, background vocals
- John Levén − bass guitar
- Tony Reno − drums
