= Let the Good Times Rock =

Single by Europe

from the album Out of This World
- B-side: "Never Say Die"
- Released: January 1989 (US); 13 March 1989 (UK)
- Genre: Glam metal, hard rock
- Length: 4:04
- Label: Epic
- Songwriter(s): Joey Tempest
- Producer(s): Ron Nevison

Europe singles chronology
"Open Your Heart" (1988)	"Let the Good Times Rock" (1989)	"More Than Meets the Eye" (1989)

Professional ratings
Review scores
Source	Rating
Number One	0/5 stars

"Let the Good Times Rock" is a 1989 single released by the Swedish hard rock band Europe. It was the third single from their album Out of This World. The single peaked at number 85 on the UK singles chart.

== Track listing ==
1. "Let the Good Times Rock"
2. "Never Say Die"
3. "Carrie"
4. "Seven Doors Hotel"

== Personnel ==
- Joey Tempest − lead vocals
- Kee Marcello − guitars and background vocals
- John Levén − bass guitar
- Mic Michaeli − keyboards and background vocals
- Ian Haugland − drums and background vocals
