= Noice =

Swedish rock band

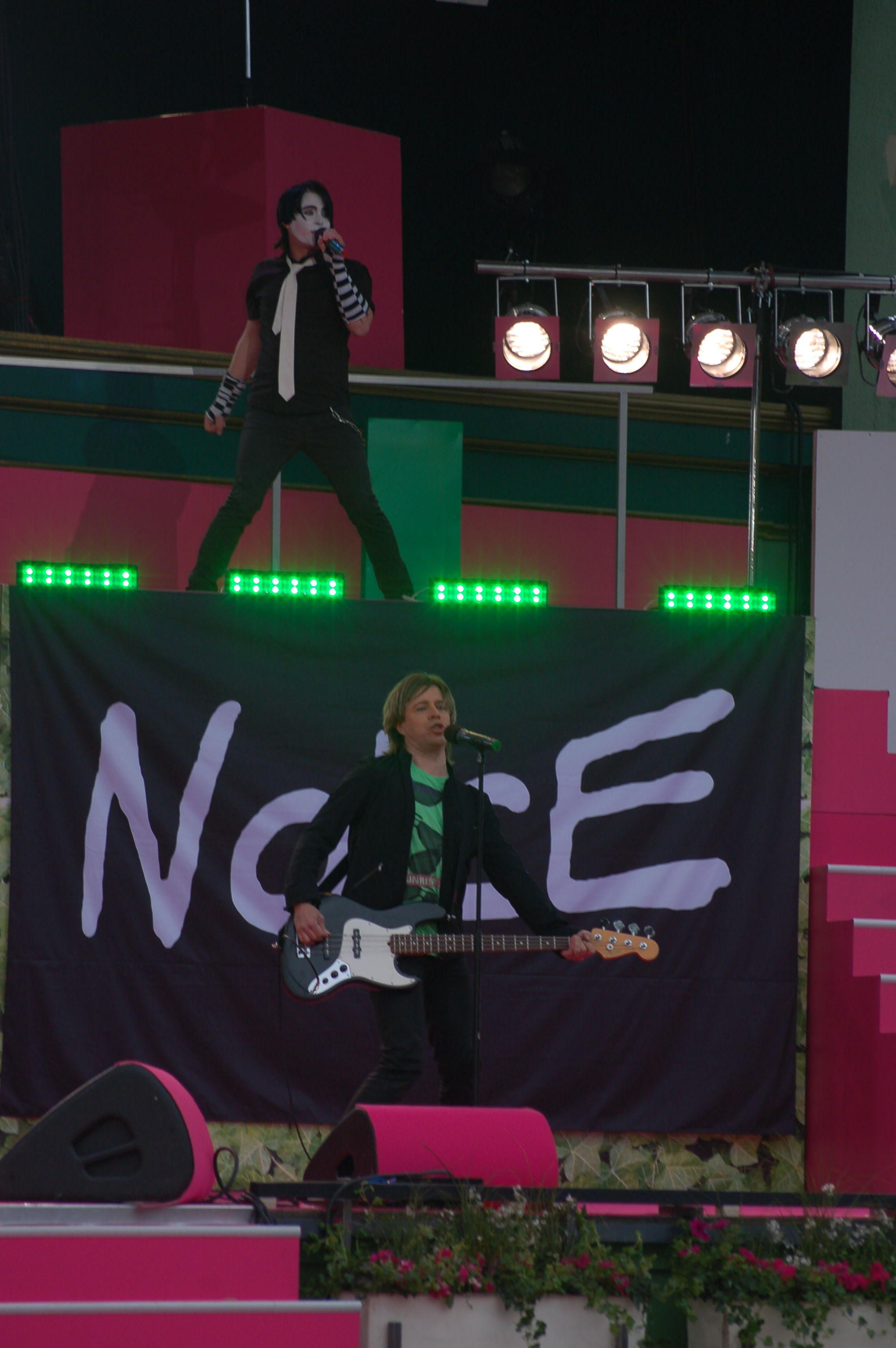
- Noice live on Gröna Lund in May 2008

Background information
- Origin: Gustavsberg, Sweden
- Genres: Punk rock, power pop, new wave, pop
- Years active: 1975–1983, 1991, 1995–1996, 2004–present
- Label: Sonet Records
- Members: Charlie Grönvall; Peo Thyrén; John Persson; Robert Klasen
- Past members: Marcus Öhrn; Hasse Carlsson; Freddie Hansson; Fredrik von Gerber; Nicklas Östergren; Funky Dan Larsson; Jonas Karlberg; Kee Marcello; Robert Liman

Noice is a Swedish punk rock band from Gustavsberg formed in 1975.

The band began in the early 1970s when friends Peo Thyrén (bass guitar, vocals), Freddie Hansson (keyboards) and Robert Klasen (drums) started playing together in an unnamed band. Later they had a band called Pink Panthers, which also included Hasse Carlsson (lead vocals, guitar) and Robert Liman (guitar, who left the band in 1979, before their debut album). In 1977 the band changed their name to Noise (spelling later changed to Noice, as there was already an existing Swedish band called Noise).

After winning a talent contest, the band were signed to Sonet and released their punk rock-influenced debut album Tonårsdrömmar ("Teenage dreams") in late October 1979. They had a major breakthrough when they performed two songs on the television show Måndagsbörsen in March 1980. Fronted by 15-year-old lead singer and guitarist Hasse Carlsson, none of the members were over the age of 18 at the time of the breakthrough. The debut album sold 100,000 copies in Sweden and the band became hugely popular, releasing a second album Bedårande barn av sin tid in 1980.

Noice scored successes at the same time as Gyllene Tider. Noice lost an Expressen vote between the two bands over which was the most popular.

The original line-up split in 1982 when Hasse Carlsson left the band, to begin his solo career, but Noice have later reformed in various incarnations.

Bassist Peo Thyrén and guitarist Kee Marcello would form the Swedish hard rock band Easy Action during Noice's hiatus in the 1980s. Founding members Freddie Hansson and Hasse Carlsson died in 2001 and 2002 respectively from diseases related to drug abuse.

On 29 September 2023, Noice released their first studio album since 2004, titled Gustavsberg.

== Founding members ==
- Hasse Carlsson, vocals, guitar, born 19 February 1965, died 4 September 2002
- Freddie Hansson, keyboards, born 22 December 1963, died 29 December 2001
- Peo Thyrén, bass, born 17 October 1962
- Robert Klasen, drums, born 10 September 1962
- Robert Liman, guitar, born 15 May 1963 (left the band in 1979)

== Members year by year ==
1975–1979

- Hasse Carlsson
- Robert Liman
- Peo Thyrén
- Robert Klasen
- Freddie Hansson

1979–1980

- Hasse Carlsson
- Peo Thyrén
- Robert Klasen
- Freddie Hansson

1980–1982

- Hasse Carlsson
- Peo Thyrén
- Fredrik von Gerber
- Freddie Hansson

1982–1983

- Nicklas Östergren
- Peo Thyrén
- Freddie Hansson
- Kee Marcello

1991

- Hasse Carlsson
- Peo Thyrén
- Fredrik von Gerber
- Freddie Hansson

1995–1996

- Hasse Carlsson
- Richard Evenlind
- Peo Thyrén
- Fredrik von Gerber
- Frank Rönningen

2004–2005

- Marcus Öhrn
- Richard Evenlind
- Peo Thyrén
- Fredrik von Gerber
- Johan Boding

2006

- Marcus Öhrn
- Peo Thyrén

2007–2008

- Marcus Öhrn
- Peo Thyrén
- Andy Ravel
- Robert Klasen

2009–2014

- Funky Dan Larsson
- Peo Thyrén
- Andy Ravel
- Robert Klasen

2015–2023

- Funky Dan Larsson
- Peo Thyrén
- Jonas Karlberg
- Robert Klasen

2023–present

- Peo Thyrén
- Robert Klasen
- John Persson
- Charlie Grönvall

== Discography ==
=== Studio albums ===
- Tonårsdrömmar (1979)
- Bedårande barn av sin tid (1980)
- Det ljuva livet (1981)
- Europa (1982)
- Vild, vild värld (1995)
- 2004 (2004)
- Gustavsberg (2023)

=== Live albums ===
- Live på Ritz (1982)
- Officiell Bootleg Live (2005) DVD
- Live 1979 + 1995 (2005)
- Nätter utan slut (2007) (Live Digital EP)

=== Albums ===
- H.I.T.S. (1989)
- Flashback 12 (1995)
- Svenska popfavoriter (1998)
- Noice Forever (2003)
- Samlat oljud (2003)
- 17 klassiker (2007)
- Noice 4for1 (2012)

=== Singles ===
- "Television"/"Du e inte man" (1979)
- "En kväll i tunnelbanan"/"I natt e hela stan vår" (1980)
- "Du lever bara en gång"/"Amerikanska bilar" (1980)
- "Allting okey" (ny version)/"Bedårande barn av sin tid" (1981)
- "Everything's Alright"/"One Night in the Subway" (1981; single released in West Germany, Austria and Switzerland)
- "Vi rymmer bara du och jag"/"1987" (1981)
- "Dolce Vita (Det ljuva livet)"/"Romans för timmen" (1982)
- "Rött ljus, rött ljus"/"Ringer dig" (1982)
- "Du och jag"/"Noice on 45" (1982)
- "Vild, vild värld"/"En kväll i tunnelbanan"/"Vild, vild värld" (aucostic version) (1995)
- "Nätter utan slut" Digital Live EP (2007)
