= Prisoners in Paradise (song) =

Single by Europe

from the album Prisoners in Paradise
- B-side: "Seventh Sign"
- Released: September 1991
- Genre: Hard rock, heavy metal
- Length: 5:36 (Album version); 4:29 (Radio edit)
- Label: Epic
- Songwriter: Joey Tempest
- Producer: Beau Hill

Europe singles chronology
"Tomorrow" (1989)	"Prisoners in Paradise" (1991)	"I'll Cry for You" (1991)

Audio sample
- file; help

"Prisoners in Paradise" is a 1991 single released by the Swedish rock band Europe. It was the first single from the album of the same name. The single charted at #8 in Sweden.

== Track listing ==
1. "Prisoners in Paradise"
2. "Seventh Sign"

== Personnel ==
- Joey Tempest − lead vocals, guitar
- Kee Marcello − guitar, background vocals
- John Levén − bass guitar
- Mic Michaeli − keyboard, background vocals
- Ian Haugland − drums
