= Halfway to Heaven (Europe song) =

Single by Europe

from the album Prisoners in Paradise
- B-side: "Yesterday's News"
- Released: March 1992
- Genre: Hard rock
- Length: 4:06
- Label: Epic
- Songwriter(s): Joey Tempest and Jim Vallance
- Producer(s): Beau Hill

Europe singles chronology
"I'll Cry for You" (1991)	"Halfway to Heaven" (1992)	"Sweet Love Child" (1993)

"Halfway to Heaven" is a 1992 single released by the Swedish heavy metal band Europe. It was the third single from their album Prisoners in Paradise. The single charted at number 42 in the United Kingdom.

The song was co-written by Europe vocalist Joey Tempest and Canadian musician/songwriter Jim Vallance in Vancouver, Canada in April 1991. "In March 1991 I received a call from Frankie LaRocka, former drummer for Bryan Adams," Vallance says, "Frankie was working as an A&R man for Epic Records in New York, and he wanted to put me together with Joey Tempest, lead singer for the group Europe. Joey flew to Vancouver in April '91, and we spent four productive days writing and demoing in my studio."

The music video for the song was shot at the Marquee Club in London.

== Track listing ==
1. "Halfway to Heaven"
2. "Yesterday's News"
3. "Superstitious"
4. "Got Your Mind in the Gutter"

== Personnel ==
- Joey Tempest − lead vocals
- Kee Marcello − guitar, background vocals
- John Levén − bass guitar
- Mic Michaeli − keyboard, background vocals
- Ian Haugland − drums

== Chart positions ==
Chart (1992)	Peak position
UK Singles Chart	42
