= Prisoners in Paradise =

- Cover art by Mark Wilkinson

Studio album by Europe
- Released: 23 September 1991
- Recorded: 1990–1991
- Studios: Enterprise Studios, Burbank, California
- Genres: AOR, hard rock
- Length: 54:57
- Label: Epic
- Producer: Beau Hill

Europe chronology
Out of This World (1988)	Prisoners in Paradise (1991)	1982–1992 (1993)

Singles from Prisoners in Paradise
- 1. "Prisoners in Paradise" Released: September 1991; 2. "I'll Cry for You" Released: December 1991; 3. "Halfway to Heaven" Released: March 1992

Professional ratings
Review scores
Source	Rating
Classic Rock	7/10 stars
The Collector's Guide to Heavy Metal	3/10
Metal Hammer	2/5 stars
Record Collector	4/5 stars

Prisoners in Paradise is the fifth studio album by the Swedish rock band Europe. It was released on 23 September 1991 by Epic Records and spawned hits such as the title track, "Prisoners in Paradise" and "I'll Cry for You". The album did not chart in the US, which is unusual for a major label follow-up to two recent (multi)platinum albums. Prisoners in Paradise is the last album to feature guitarist Kee Marcello.

The band's guitarist Kee Marcello states in his 2011 biography that Bob Rock was the first choice for producer for this album, and agreed initially but pulled out to work on Metallica's eponymous album instead. The large number of finished bonus tracks is also explained in this book: the first version of this album, called "Seventh Sign" was rejected by the label in 1990 and the band had to write and record new songs. Five more tracks were demoed in addition to the 25 listed below; two of them were rewritten and became "New Love in Town" on Last Look at Eden and "Bring it All Home" on Bag of Bones. Most of the unreleased songs down below can be found on YouTube as demo recordings. Two of the previously unreleased tracks, "Wild Child" and "Don't Know How to Love No More" were re-recorded for Kee Marcello's 2016 solo album "Scaling Up" on Frontiers Records.

== Track listing ==
No.	Title	Lyrics	Music	Length
1.	"All or Nothing"	Eric Martin, Andre Pessis, Joey Tempest	Tempest	3:54
2.	"Halfway to Heaven"	Tempest, Jim Vallance	Tempest, Vallance	4:06
3.	"I'll Cry for You"	Tempest, Nick Graham	Tempest, Graham	5:21
4.	"Little Bit of Lovin'"	Tempest	Tempest, Kee Marcello	4:48
5.	"Talk to Me"	Tempest, Mic Michaeli	Michaeli, Tempest	4:06
6.	"Seventh Sign"	Tempest	Marcello, Tempest, Michaeli	4:42
7.	"Prisoners in Paradise"	Tempest	Tempest	5:36
8.	"Bad Blood"	Tempest, Michaeli	Marcello, Tempest	4:19
9.	"Homeland"	Tempest, Michaeli	Tempest, Michaeli, Marcello	4:51
10.	"Got Your Mind in the Gutter"	Tempest, Beau Hill	Marcello, Hill	4:59
11.	"'Til My Heart Beats Down Your Door"	Brian McDonald, Fiona	Tempest, Michaeli	3:47
12.	"Girl from Lebanon"	Tempest	Tempest	4:20
Total length:				54:49

Japanese edition bonus tracks
No.	Title	Lyrics	Music	Length
13.	"Break Free"	Tempest	Tempest, Marcello	4:05
14.	"Yesterday's News"	Tempest, Marcello, Michaeli, John Levén, Ian Haugland	Tempest	5:27
Total length:				64:21

Spitfire Records 2001 remaster bonus tracks
No.	Title	Lyrics	Music	Length
13.	"Mr. Government Man"	Tempest, Hill	Tempest, Hill	3:36
14.	"A Long Time Comin'"	Tempest	Tempest, Marcello	3:55
Total length:				62:20

Tracks from the Prisoners in Paradise recording sessions available on various compilations
No.	Title	Writer(s)	Length
1.	"Sweet Love Child" (released on the 1982–1992 and 1982–2000 compilations)	Tempest, Marcello, Michaeli	4:57
2.	"Rainbow Warrior" (released on CD with Encyclopedia of Swedish Hard Rock and Heavy Metal 1970–1996)	Tempest, Marcello, Michaeli, Levén, Haugland	6:35
3.	"Blame It on Me" (released on CD with Encyclopedia of Swedish Hard Rock and Heavy Metal vol II (2002))	Tempest, Marcello, Michaeli, Levén, Haugland	4:45
4.	"Here Comes the Night" (released on the compilation album Rock the Night: The Very Best of Europe)	Tempest	4:27

Demo tracks that remain unreleased
No.	Title	Length
1.	"Wild Child"	4:05
2.	"Don't Know How to Love No More"	5:50
3.	"Wanted Man"	4:44
4.	"Little Sinner"	3:56
5.	"Never Gonna Say Goodbye"	3:45
6.	"Stranded"	4:32
7.	"I Want Your Love"	6:20

(Note: These unreleased demos can be heard on YouTube and, thusly, accurate time lengths for these songs were acquired.)

== Personnel ==
=== Europe ===
- Joey Tempest – vocals
- Kee Marcello – guitars
- John Levén – bass guitar
- Mic Michaeli – keyboards
- Ian Haugland – drums

=== Additional musicians ===
- Nate Winger, Paul Winger – background vocals

=== Production ===
- Beau Hill – producer, mixing
- Jimmy Hoyson – engineer, mixing
- Martin Horenburg – assistant engineer
- Ted Jensen – mastering
- Jeff Katz – photography
- Mark Wilkinson – illustrations
- Tony Sellari – art direction

== Charts ==
Chart (1991)	Peak position
Austrian Albums (Ö3 Austria)	32
Dutch Albums (Album Top 100)	60
Finnish Albums (The Official Finnish Charts)	21
German Albums (Offizielle Top 100)	38
Italian Albums (Musica e Dischi)	22
Japanese Albums (Oricon)	12
Norwegian Albums (VG-lista)	18
Swedish Albums (Sverigetopplistan)	9
Swiss Albums (Schweizer Hitparade)	17
UK Albums (Official Charts)	61

== Certifications ==
Region	Certification	Certified units/sales
Sweden (GLF)	Platinum	100,000^{^}
^{^} Shipments figures based on certification alone.
