= Open Your Heart (Europe song) =

Single by Swedish band Europe

Single by Europe

from the album Wings of Tomorrow
- B-side: "Wings of Tomorrow"
- Released: October 1984
- Genre: Heavy metal
- Length: 4:30
- Label: Epic
- Songwriter: Joey Tempest
- Producer: Leif Mases

Europe singles chronology
"Stormwind" (1984)	"Open Your Heart" (1984)	"Rock the Night" (1985)

"Open Your Heart"

Single by Europe

from the album Out of This World
- B-side: "Just the Beginning"
- Released: October 1988
- Genre: Glam metal
- Length: 4:05 (Album Version); 3:54 (Edited Version)
- Label: Epic
- Songwriter: Joey Tempest
- Producer: Ron Nevison

Europe singles chronology
"Superstitious" (1988)	"Open Your Heart" (1988)	"Let the Good Times Rock" (1989)

Professional ratings
Review scores
Source	Rating
Number One	1.5/5 stars

"Open Your Heart" is a power ballad released by the Swedish heavy metal band Europe. It was released twice; in 1984 as a single from the album Wings of Tomorrow, and in 1988 as a single from the album Out of This World. The music video for the 1988 release was directed by Jean Pellerin and Doug Freel and shot in London, England.

The lyrics are nearly identical in both these versions, except for one verse:

1984: "Oh girl, before I fall... Maybe the sun will continue to shine, maybe the rain will continue to fall, maybe you want to leave me behind, maybe you'll change and give me a call."

1988: "Before we lose it all... Maybe the time has its own way of healing, maybe it dries the tears in your eyes, but never change the way that I'm feeling, only you can answer my cries."

== Personnel ==
=== 1984 version ===
- Joey Tempest − vocal, acoustic guitar and keyboards
- John Norum − electric guitar
- John Levén − bass
- Tony Reno − drums

=== 1988 version ===
- Joey Tempest − vocals
- John Levén − bass
- Mic Michaeli − keyboards
- Ian Haugland − drums
- Kee Marcello − lead guitar

=== Charts ===
Chart (1988)	Peak position	Ref.
Belgium Ultratop	31	
France SNEP	67	
Netherlands Dutch Charts	42	
UK Singles Chart	86	
