= Out of This World (Europe album) =

Studio album by Europe
- Released: 9 August 1988
- Recorded: March–June 1988
- Studios: Olympic Studios and Townhouse Studios, London, England
- Genres: Arena rock, hard rock, glam metal
- Length: 47:50
- Label: Epic
- Producer: Ron Nevison

Europe chronology
| The Final Countdown (1986) | Out of This World (1988) | Prisoners in Paradise (1991) |

Singles from Out of This World
- 1. "Superstitious" Released: August 1988; 2. "Open Your Heart" Released: October 1988; 3. "Let the Good Times Rock" Released: January 1989 (US); 4. "More Than Meets the Eye" Released: March 1989 (JPN)

Out of This World is the fourth studio album by the Swedish rock band Europe. Released on 9 August 1988 through Epic Records, the album was a commercial success selling over 3 million units worldwide, peaking at number 19 on the US Billboard 200 chart and reaching high positions in charts worldwide. It was recorded at Olympic Studios and Townhouse Studios, London, England. Out of This World is the first Europe album to feature former Easy Action and Noice guitarist Kee Marcello on lead guitar, replacing outgoing lead guitarist John Norum.

Four singles were released worldwide from the album: "Superstitious", "Open Your Heart", "Let the Good Times Rock", "More Than Meets the Eye".

== Music ==
=== Songs ===
"Superstitious" is the first song on the album, written by Joey Tempest. It was the first single released from the album and is arguably one of Europe's most recognizable and popular songs. The song was released in Europe, Australia and New Zealand in July 1988. The song reached number one in Norway and their homeland Sweden and peaked at number 9 on the Billboard Mainstream Rock Tracks. The single charted in many other European charts as well.

"Open Your Heart" and "Let the Good Times Rock" would become minor hits in the UK. Three more singles would be released, yet none of them charted. "Sign of the Times" was released as a single only in Argentina in 1988 and "Tomorrow" only in Brazil in 1989.

== Release and Reception ==
Professional ratings
Review scores
| Source | Rating |
|---|---|
| AllMusic | 3/5 stars |
| Classic Rock | 7/10 stars |
| The Collector's Guide to Heavy Metal | 3/10 |
| Record Collector | 4/5 stars |

Out of This World was the band's follow up album to the successful album The Final Countdown, but it did not match the success of its predecessor. Upon its release in August 1988, Out of This World peaked at No. 19 on the Billboard 200 album chart. The album is the band's best-selling album in Switzerland. Out of This World achieved platinum status in the United States, platinum status in Switzerland and gold in Canada.

Out of This World did not spawn any major US hit singles. On the US Hot 100, the song "Superstitious" became a moderate hit, peaking at #31, while the singles "Open Your Heart" and "Let the Good Times Rock" did not chart on the Hot 100.

Upon its release, Out of This World received mostly mixed reviews with AllMusic contributor Andy Hinds writing "Europe produces made-to-order lite metal with admirable craftsmanship and occasionally memorable hooks. This is hard rock with all the edges sanded off. Capable lead singer Joey Tempest carries the tunes with nonthreatening panache, while Kee Marcello (who proved his virtuosity on Europe's previous tour in 1987 by performing "Flight of the Bumblebee") provides plenty of nice guitar solos." Paul Elliott of Classic Rock considers the album "the strongest" of the two follow-up albums after the better selling The Final Countdown. Tim Jones of Record Collector gave a better review, stating the album is "a stratospheric set of a dozen imperious rockers." Canadian journalist Martin Popoff wrote the album is "an offensive pop rock outing... and calling Europe "a dunce-cap posse solidly in search of cash and chicks, egregiously removed from any sort of hard rock acumen."

== Out of This World Tour ==
Prior to the release of the album, in the summer of 1988, the band travelled the U.S. together with Def Leppard. However, the band's management considered a promotional tour of Europe (the continent) more important and made the band withdraw from the highly successful American tour. It has been reported that manager Thomas Erdtman made the decision as he did not want to share more US revenues with American manager Herbie Herbert as this was agreed in a contract. The decision ended the band's participation in the tour before the album's release.

After the promotional tour was over, the band set on rehearsing for the upcoming Out Of This World Tour, which began with a bombastic show (60,000 visitors) in Mumbai, India in November 1988. Then the band flew to Japan, where they filmed the video for "Let the Good Times Rock". The scheduled tour of Australia was, however, unexpectedly cancelled. From January to April 1989, the band toured all over Europe. In some places, in Germany particularly, the band did not manage to fill up the arenas and concert halls like they had done during the Final Countdown Tour, despite more and more good reviews from the musical press. In May 1989, the band was supposed to go over to the USA again. But the album sales were not as high as had been expected.

So in the end, there was no U.S. tour and the only concert the band played in the summer of 1989 was the legendary one-day festival at Milton Keynes (UK) Bowl where they supported headliners Bon Jovi. Skid Row and Vixen were also on the bill. After that, the band decided to move to Los Angeles and compose new songs for the next album.

== Track listing ==
All tracks are written by Joey Tempest, except where indicated.

Side one
| No. | Title | Lyrics | Music | Length |
|---|---|---|---|---|
| 1. | "Superstitious" | | | 4:35 |
| 2. | "Let the Good Times Rock" | | | 4:04 |
| 3. | "Open Your Heart" | | | 4:04 |
| 4. | "More Than Meets the Eye" | Tempest | Tempest, Kee Marcello, Mic Michaeli | 3:20 |
| 5. | "Coast to Coast" | Tempest | Tempest, Marcello, Michaeli | 4:00 |
| 6. | "Ready or Not" | | | 4:05 |

Side two
| No. | Title | Lyrics | Music | Length |
|---|---|---|---|---|
| 7. | "Sign of the Times" | | | 4:15 |
| 8. | "Just the Beginning" | Marcello, Tempest | Marcello | 4:32 |
| 9. | "Never Say Die" | | | 4:00 |
| 10. | "Lights and Shadows" | | | 4:04 |
| 11. | "Tower's Callin'" | | | 3:48 |
| 12. | "Tomorrow" | | | 3:04 |

Interviews with the band from before and around the album's release indicate that a title track and a cover song were recorded but not included. Kee Marcello claims in his biography The Rock Star that God Forgot to have written a number of complete songs that were rejected for this album - "Too Far Gone", "Another World" and "Can't Fake Love" are listed. Marcello also clarifies that the "cover song" was in fact a Diane Warren demo called "Look Away", a Billboard No. 1 hit for the band Chicago in December 1988.

== Personnel ==
=== Europe ===
- Joey Tempest – vocals, piano on "Tomorrow"
- Kee Marcello – guitar, backing vocals
- John Levén – bass guitar
- Mic Michaeli – keyboards, backing vocals
- Ian Haugland – drums, backing vocals

=== Additional musicians ===
- Keith Murrell – additional backing vocals on "Coast to Coast" and "Just the Beginning"
- Mike Moran – string arrangements and conducting

=== Production ===
- Ron Nevison – producer, engineer, mixing
- Paul Hume – engineer, string engineer
- Rob Bozas, Andy Bradfield, Heidi Cannavo – assistant engineers
- Mats Grahn – multitechnician (bass, guitar, and keyboard technician)
- Paul Jamieson – drum technician
- Bernard Maisner – hand lettering
- Lynn Goldsmith – photography
- Joel Zimmerman – art direction

== Charts ==
| Chart (1988) | Peak position |
|---|---|
| Australian Albums (ARIA) | 28 |
| Austrian Albums (Ö3 Austria) | 16 |
| Canada Top Albums/CDs (RPM) | 30 |
| Dutch Albums (Album Top 100) | 7 |
| Finnish Albums (The Official Finnish Charts) | 5 |
| French Albums (SNEP) | 19 |
| German Albums (Offizielle Top 100) | 10 |
| Italian Albums (Musica e Dischi) | 8 |
| Japanese Albums (Oricon) | 4 |
| Norwegian Albums (VG-lista) | 1 |
| Swedish Albums (Sverigetopplistan) | 1 |
| Swiss Albums (Schweizer Hitparade) | 3 |
| UK Albums (Official Charts) | 12 |
| US Billboard 200 | 19 |

== Sales and certifications ==
Certifications for Out of This World
| Region | Certification | Certified units/sales |
|---|---|---|
| Canada (Music Canada) | Gold | 50,000^{^} |
| France (SNEP) | Gold | 100,000^{*} |
| Spain (Promusicae) | Gold | 50,000^{^} |
| Sweden (GLF) | Platinum | 100,000^{^} |
| Switzerland (IFPI Switzerland) | Gold | 25,000^{^} |
| United States (RIAA) | Platinum | 1,000,000^{^} |
^{*} Sales figures based on certification alone.^{^} Shipments figures based on certification alone.
