= Wings of Tomorrow =

Studio album by Europe
- Released: 24 February 1984
- Studios: Polar, Stockholm
- Genre: Heavy metal
- Length: 38:49
- Label: Hot Records
- Producer: Leif Mases

Europe chronology
Europe (1983)	Wings of Tomorrow (1984)	The Final Countdown (1986)

Singles from Wings of Tomorrow
- 1. "Lyin' Eyes" Released: 1984; 2. "Stormwind" Released: February 1984; 3. "Dreamer" Released: April 1984 (Japan only); 4. "Open Your Heart" Released: October 1984

Professional ratings
Review scores
Source	Rating
AllMusic	3/5 stars
The Collector's Guide to Heavy Metal	6/10
The Rolling Stone Album Guide	1.5/5 stars

Wings of Tomorrow is the second studio album by the Swedish rock band Europe. It was released on 24 February 1984, by Hot Records in Sweden, and by Epic Records in the United States. Wings of Tomorrow is the last album to feature drummer Tony Reno.

The song "Scream of Anger" was originally titled "Black Journey Through My Soul".

== Track listing ==
All tracks are written by Joey Tempest, except where noted.

Side one
No.	Title	Lyrics	Music	Length
1.	"Stormwind"			4:31
2.	"Scream of Anger"	Tempest	Tempest, Marcel Jacob	4:06
3.	"Open Your Heart"			4:10
4.	"Treated Bad Again"			3:46
5.	"Aphasia"	instrumental	John Norum	2:32

Side two
No.	Title	Length
6.	"Wings of Tomorrow"	3:59
7.	"Wasted Time"	4:10
8.	"Lyin' Eyes"	3:47
9.	"Dreamer"	4:28
10.	"Dance the Night Away"	3:35

== Personnel ==
=== Europe ===
- Joey Tempest – lead and backing vocals, keyboards, acoustic guitars
- John Norum – guitars, backing vocals
- John Levén – bass guitar
- Tony Reno – drums

=== Production ===
- Leif Mases – producer, engineer
- Peter Engberg – cover illustration
- Magnus Elgquist – photography
- Camilla B. – cover design

== Charts ==
Chart (1984)	Peak position
Japanese Albums (Oricon)	24
Swedish Albums (Sverigetopplistan)	20

== Cover versions ==
"Wings of Tomorrow" and "Scream of Anger" have been covered by the melodic death metal band Arch Enemy. The latter, notes guitarist Michael Amott in the liner notes for Wages of Sin (on the bonus CD of which the song appears), was "recorded and mixed during the Burning Bridges sessions, December 1998/January 1999. Originally released on the Japanese version of Burning Bridges. A cover version of the most successful hard rock band to ever emerge from Sweden (no, that's not Arch Enemy!)… It was the most aggressive track of their career – and probably one of Arch Enemy's softest moments? Anyhow, we learnt it and recorded it in an afternoon." Amott guested with Europe when they played Wings of Tomorrow in its entirety, in Stockholm, on 3 March 2014. "He is a friend of the band and grew up listening to Europe's music," reported Joey Tempest. "It was an honour and so much fun to have him with us on stage!"
