= Tony Reno =

Swedish drummer

- Also known as: Tony Lace
- Born: Tony Peter Niemistö; 10 February 1963 (age 63); Danderyd, Sweden
- Genres: Heavy metal, hard rock
- Occupation: Drummer
- Years active: 1979–1992

Tony Peter Niemistö (born 10 February 1963) is a semi-retired Swedish musician, best known as Tony Renault, the original drummer in the rock band Europe. He played on Europe's first two albums, Europe and Wings of Tomorrow. He was fired from the band by producer Thomas Erdtman without informing the band members before the second leg of the Wings of Tomorrow tour in 1984. He was replaced by Ian Haugland.

In 1986 Niemistö joined the heavy metal band Geisha, replacing Mikkey Dee. Niemistö changed his stage name to Tony Lace, but eventually he went back to using his real name. Geisha released the album Phantasmagoria in 1987, before splitting up two years later. Geisha's vocalist Yenz Cheyenne then formed the band =Y=, which Niemistö joined. They released an EP, =Y= in 1991, and an album, Rawchild in 1992.

Niemistö had not participated in anything related to Europe for 29 years. That activity drought ended in 2013, when the group was celebrating the 30th anniversary of the release of their original album. Niemistö autographed 30 copies of a canvas replica of the 1983 album's cover, and then later on took part in a 10-guitar auction (of which the proceeds from 'The Final Countdown' guitar benefitted the efforts of the 'Médecins Sans Frontiers' organization in the Philippines), where he autographed the guitar containing art of the debut album.

Niemistö is currently living in Vallentuna, Sweden, where he works for a computer company.

== Discography ==
=== Europe ===
- Europe (1983)
- Wings of Tomorrow (1984)

=== Geisha ===
- Phantasmagoria (1987)

=== =Y= ===
- =Y= (1991)
- Rawchild (1992)
