= Kee Marcello =

Swedish guitarist

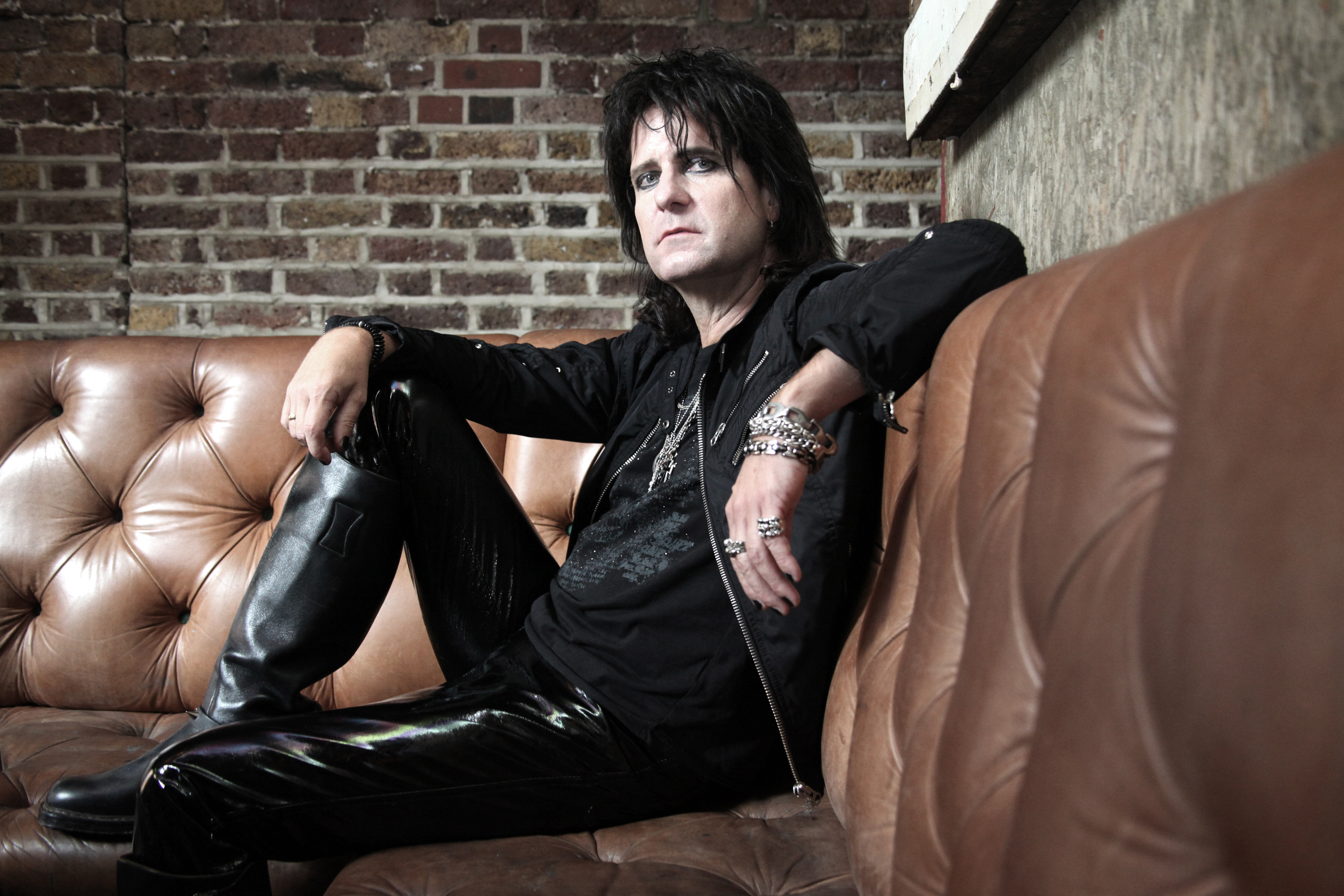
- Marcello in 2011

Background information
- Born: Kjell Hilding Lövbom; 20 February 1960 (age 66); Ludvika, Sweden
- Genres: Hard rock
- Occupation: Musician
- Instruments: Guitar, vocals
- Years active: 1978–present
- Formerly of: Easy Action, Noice, Europe, Kee Marcello's K2
- Website: Kee Marcello on Facebook

Kee Marcello (born Kjell Hilding Lövbom; 20 February 1960) is a Swedish guitarist and vocalist, best known as the former guitarist in the hard rock bands Europe and Easy Action. He has also pursued a solo career.

== Career ==
Throughout the years, Marcello played in various bands such as Stetson Cody Group, Norbom Hilke and Noice, before he formed Easy Action in 1982. They released two albums, Easy Action and That Makes One. Easy Action was the first Scandinavian band to sign a worldwide major label deal with a US label, with the Warner label Sire Records in 1983. Zinny J. Zan later left the band and was replaced by Tommy Nilsson. They recorded That Makes One in 1985–1986 and released it in 1986, only months before Marcello left the band in November 1986 to join Europe, replacing their original guitarist John Norum. In 1993 he formed/joined Red Fun together with Easy Action drummer Fredrik Von Gerber and the same year they released their first and only album Red Fun. In 1995 he embarked on his solo career by the release of his first solo album Shine On. and his fifth and most recent one, Scaling Up was released by Frontiers Records in October 2016. During 2013–2014 he starred in the Swedish production of the Broadway musical Rock Of Ages (musical) in which he got to portray himself in a specially written role. Since 2015 he has participated in different versions of Rock Of 80's which did a sold out stadium tour of Sweden during the fall of 2016. Later he toured with the Kee Marcello Band.

Marcello had previously collaborated with Europe vocalist Joey Tempest on the hugely successful single "Give a Helpin' Hand" for the charity project 'Swedish Metal Aid'. He also produced the platinum selling record and subsequently gave Tempest his very first hit single. The success of this collaboration was probably instrumental for the decision of asking Marcello to become the new guitar player. When he joined Europe in 1986, the band had not done any extensive touring outside Sweden, but that was about to change when "The Final Countdown" eventually reached number one on the singles charts in 25 countries. In 1987, Europe embarked on "The Final Countdown World Tour", their first world tour.

In 1988, Marcello recorded his first studio album with Europe, Out of This World, at Olympic Studios in London. Later that same year they embarked on the "Out of This World Tour", which started off with a US leg together with Def Leppard. Ex-Thin Lizzy keyboardist Darren Wharton's group Dare supported the band on the European leg of the tour. Marcello, who in 1987 emigrated with the rest of the band to the Caribbean in an attempt to escape the then ferocious Swedish margin tax, was spending most of his time in Los Angeles when not in Providenciales on Turks and Caicos Islands. The writing and pre-production of the next album took place in LA and San Francisco. It was recorded in 1990–1991 at Enterprise Studios in Burbank, California. Prisoners in Paradise was released in 1991 and shortly after they embarked on the "Prisoners in Paradise World Tour". After the tour the band decided to go on hiatus in 1992.

In 1993, Marcello joined former Easy Action drummer Freddie Von Gerber in the band Red Fun, and released a self-titled album that featured a melodic metal sound with heavy blues influences. In 1995 he released his first solo album Shine On, in the singer-songwriting tradition and therefore a take off from his previous work. During 1997–2001 Marcello produced and wrote or co-wrote songs for various artists in his own studio, "GEM Studios", in Gothenburg, Sweden. Namely, Canadian band The Moffats number one hit single "Bang Bang Boom", the title song for R&R Hall of Fame inductee Percy Sledge's 2004 album Shining Through the Rain, and 3 consecutive platinum albums for Swedish singer Pandora in Japan. He also did several guest appearances as a guitar player, like on the 1999 In Flames album Colony, contributing the second guitar solo on the song "Coerced Coexistence". In 2005, he also helped and produced Supergroupies album "Supergroupies".

In 2003, Marcello released the album Melon Demon Divine under the project band name Kee Marcello's K2. The power trio consisted of Ken Sandin on bass and Snowy Shaw on drums. Over the following years of touring the band went through some member changes, with the exception of bass player Ken Sandin, who is in the band to this day. When Europe reunited with John Norum later that year, Marcello decided not to be part of the reunion. "I told them I didn't want to participate in a [new] studio album because musically, I want to go in a different kind of direction than the music Europe stands for," he said in an interview, "Then we talked for a while about doing a six-piece tour – it didn't turn out that way because of different reasons." However Marcello also made it clear he's happy that Europe reformed and are touring without him. "I think it's really great that the guys are travelling around playing all those songs to a lot of happy fans."

Easy Action reunited for a gig at the Sweden Rock Festival in 2006 and re-released their debut album Easy Action with some previously unreleased live recordings. Kee Marcello's K2 toured extensively all over Europe and the East during 2008–2009 and performed in the 2007 Swedish Eurovision song contest with Alannah Myles. In 2009, Marcello signed a management deal with Gerry Helders (TMS Management), and started working on two new albums, due for release 2011–2012. He also became an endorsee of Gibson Guitars that year.

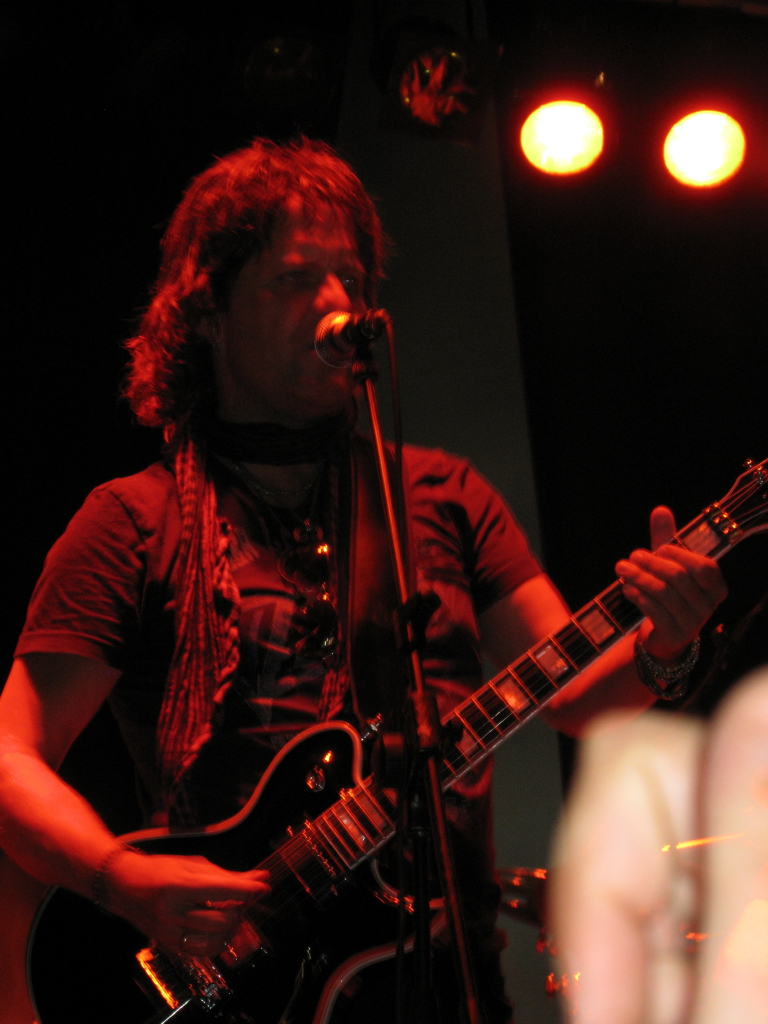
Marcello performing in 2008

After having more than 2,000 applicants, Marcello and TMS Management put together an audition for members to his new band at Little Halings, London, in November 2010. The band have been doing showcases at Midem in Cannes, France, and ILMC in London, and will embark on their first tour in 2012. However, this tour was cancelled because of problems with management and sponsors.

On 19 October 2011 Marcello's autobiography, The Rock Star God Forgot, was released in Sweden, with graphic details about Marcello's drug use. An English translation will be released worldwide in 2012. His third solo album, Redux: Europe, was released on 11 November 2011 in Sweden, released worldwide on 13 January 2012. It contains the brand new title track as well as re-recordings of Europe and Easy Action tracks. His fourth solo album, Judas Kiss, was released on 5 April 2013.

In 2016, Marcello was signed to Italian label Frontiers Records and released a new solo album – "Scaling Up" – in the fall of 2016. Two tracks from the pre-Prisoners in Paradise demo LeBaron Boys were included on the album.

Marcello is also competing in horse racing in Sweden and made the news when he was not allowed to participate in a celebrity race with sports star Patrik Sjöberg due to failing a mandatory pre-race alcohol test.

In 2017 Frontiers is announced the signing of Kee of Hearts, a band project built around Tommy Heart, singer of Fair Warning and Kee Marcello. The line-up rounded out by Ken Sandin on bass guitar and Italian drummer Marco Di Salvia (Hardline, Pino Scotto). The guys started working on the album in late 2016 with songwriting and direction of producer Alessandro Del Vecchio, that played keyboards on. The eponymous Kee of Hearts was released on 15 September 2017, anticipated by singles A New Dimension on 27 June, The Storm on 13 July, Bridge to Heaven on 17 August and Crimson Dawn on 6 September.

== Discography ==
As part of Kee & The Kick

- 1981: Kee & The Kick

As part of Easy Action

- 1983: Easy Action
- 1986: That Makes One

As part of Europe

- 1988: Out of This World
- 1991: Prisoners in Paradise

As Kee Marcello's K2

- 2004: Melon Demon Divine

Solo albums

- 1995: Shine On
- 2011: Redux: Europe
- 2013: Judas Kiss
- 2016: Scaling Up

As Kee of Hearts

- 2017: Kee of Hearts

As Out Of This World (with Tommy Heart)

- 2021: Out Of This World

Featured with other artists

- 1982: Noice – Europa
- 1986: Mikael Rickfors – Rickfors
- 1991: Infra-Blue, Joey Tafolla, Shrapnel
- 1991: Judas River, Mikael Rickfors
- 1991: A Bit on the Side, Torben Schmidt, Thunderstruck Records
- 1992: Kosmonaut Gagarins Rapport, Edin Adahl, Viva Records
- 1992: Back to the Roots, Ulf Wakenius, Universal Music
- 1993: Walter Ego, Sy Klopps, Guitar Recordings
- 1993: Red Fun – Red Fun, Music For Nations
- 1997: Happy Man Don't Kill, Mikael Rickfors, Sonet Grammofon AB
- 1997: Remember my name, Sand & Gold, Base Point Media
- 1997: Killer Bee, World Order Revolution, Freedom Records
- 1999: Colony, Nuclear Blast
- 2001: Eclipse, The Truth and a little more, z records
- 2002: city boy blues, Zinny J. Zan, Fastlane Fecords
- 2003: Lost in Vain, LAUDAMUS, Escape Music
- 2003: Wake the Nations, Ken Tamplin, Song Haus Music
- 2003: Fire, Walk with Me, VII Gates, Sound Riot
- 2005: Taste Some Liberty, Pavic, Anteo Records & Publishing
- 2005: The race is on, Sha-Boom, AOR Heaven
- 2007: Andrew Bordoni & Friends, Andrew Bordoni, Awb Productions Inc
- 2008: No Man's Land, Myland, Valery Records
- 2008: Unconditioned, Pavic, Anteo Records & Publishing
- 2009: Aphasia, Alex Falcone, Rock Royce Records
- 2009: Lit Up: A Millennium Tribute to Buckcherryteaming up with Chris Catena, Versailles
- 2009: Glamunition, Åge Sten Nilsen, Universal Records
- 2009: Back to the Roots, Ulf Wakenius, Universal Records
- 2010: Earth Shadow, Yana Mangi, Sakuntala
- 2011: Unfinished Business, Eric Carr, Auto Rock Records
- 2012: Mountain, Nubian Rose, MBM Import Service
- 2014: Thomas Zwijsen – Perferct Storm (Nylonized Album), Yellowdog and Blacklake
- 2014: Cry Wolf, Wolfpakk, AFM Records
- 2015: Kingdom of Isolation, Airstream, Metalville Records
- 2016: Wide Eyes, Lost in the night, The Diamond ( Sincom Music Simone Cozzetto)
