= Joey Tempest =

Swedish singer (born 1963)

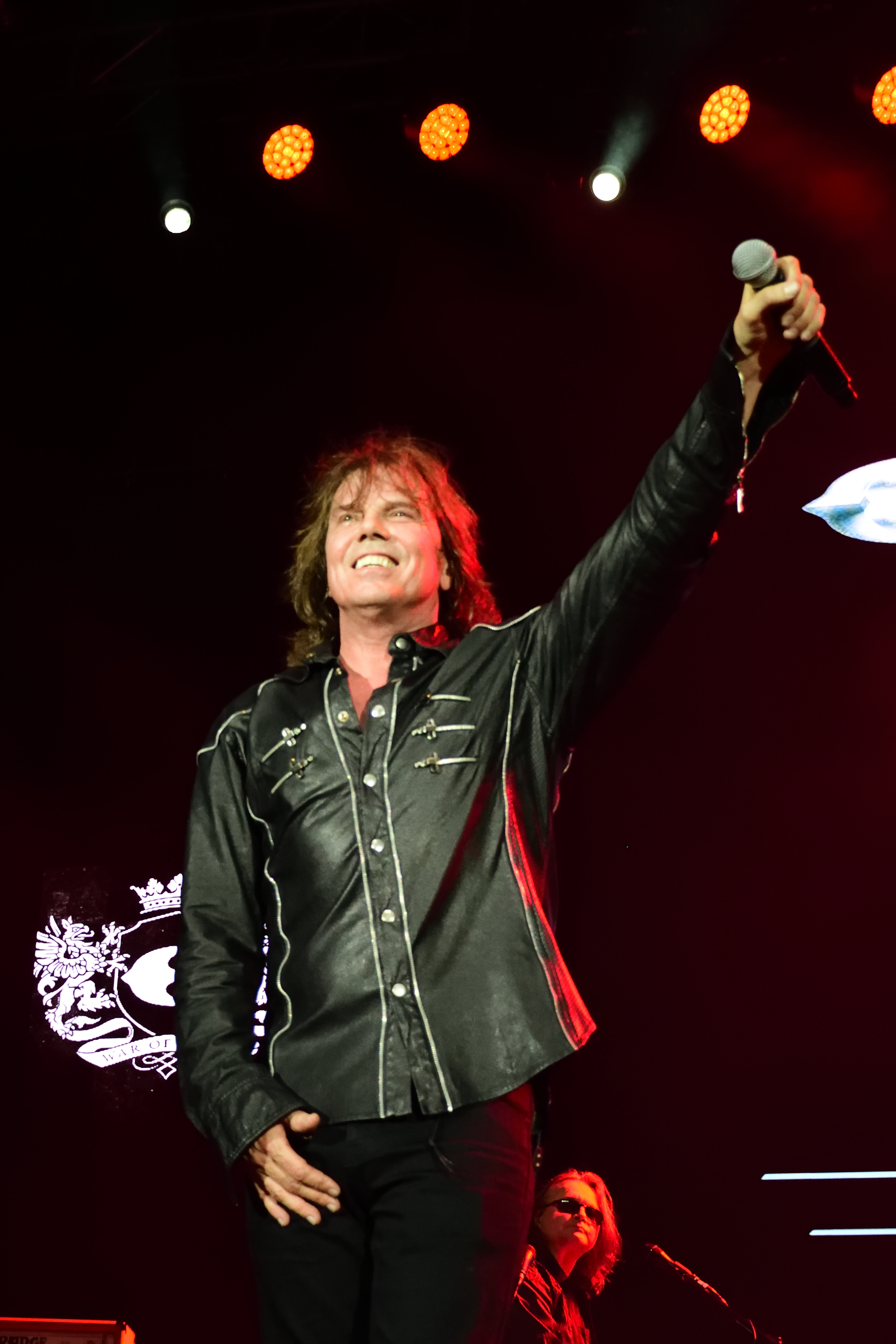
- Tempest performing in 2018

Background information
- Born: Rolf Magnus Joakim Larsson; 19 August 1963 (age 63); Upplands Väsby, Stockholm, Sweden
- Genres: Heavy metal; hard rock; glam metal; country rock
- Occupations: Singer; songwriter; musician
- Instruments: Vocals; guitar; keyboards
- Years active: 1979–present
- Labels: Polar; Polydor; Sonet; Epic
- Member of: Europe
- Spouse: Lisa Worthington (m. 2000)
- Website: europetheband.com

Rolf Magnus Joakim Larsson (born 19 August 1963), known professionally as Joey Tempest, is a Swedish musician and the lead vocalist of the rock band Europe. He wrote most of the band's hit songs, including "The Final Countdown", "Rock the Night", "Cherokee", "Open Your Heart" and "Carrie".

== Early life ==
Rolf Magnus Joakim Larsson was born in Stockholm, Sweden on 19 August 1963. When he was eight years old, he would sit in front of the television or radio with a tape recorder and try to capture songs from the UK or US that he liked and listen to them over and over again. He learned how to play the piano and a friend of his father's taught him three chords (A, D and E) on his sister's acoustic guitar.

Larsson played football and ice hockey and competed in go-cart racing; he once came in fourth place in the Junior Cart Race, a Swedish championship. Like many of the other Europe members, Larsson grew up in Stockholm suburb Upplands Väsby. His biggest influences were Thin Lizzy and Led Zeppelin. During his teens, Larsson played in a number of bands such as Jet, Blazer, Made in Hong Kong and Roxanne. At that time, Larsson alternated between playing rhythm guitar and bass, in addition to lead vocals.

== Career ==
=== Europe ===
Larsson started performing in 1979, creating the stage name "Joey Tempest", inspired by William Shakespeare's tragicomedy The Tempest as well as the song "Sparks of the Tempest" by American progressive rock band Kansas. He formed the band Force with guitarist John Norum, bassist Peter Olsson and drummer Tony Reno. Force immediately began building a reputation and a fanbase in the suburbs of Stockholm. In 1982, they changed their name to Europe and won the music competition Rock-SM. The first prize was a record deal with Hot Records. With Tempest as the frontman, Europe released its self-titled debut studio album in 1983 and Wings of Tomorrow in 1984.

Tempest wrote the international hit "The Final Countdown"; it topped the sales chart in 26 countries, sold 15 million copies, and was played at the closing ceremony of the 1987 EuroBasket and the 1988 Summer Olympics. After The Final Countdown, Europe released two more studio albums, namely Out of This World (1988) and Prisoners in Paradise (1991), before their final concert in March 1992. Europe ended their final tour in Portsmouth and did not perform together again until New Year's Eve, 1999 to 2000.

=== Solo career ===
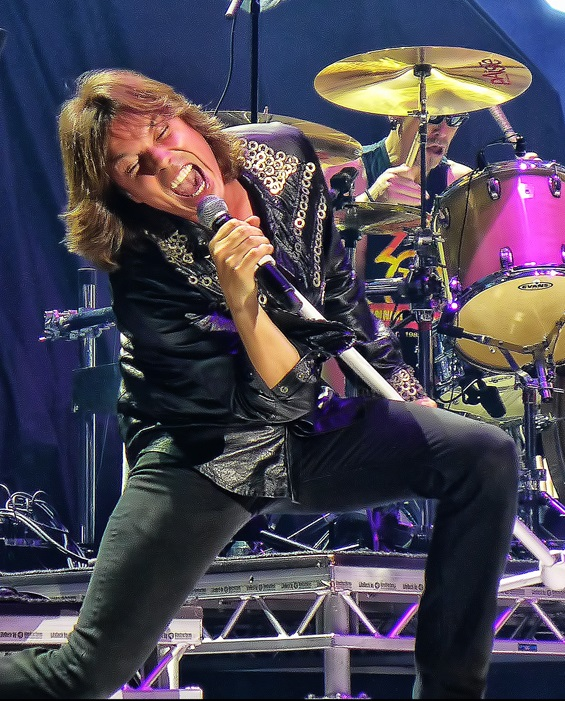
Tempest in 2013

In 1995, Tempest's solo debut album, A Place to Call Home, was released. He recalled it his "singer/songwriter album" influenced by his love of performers like Van Morrison and Bob Dylan. The album, which was produced by Dan Sundquist, was recorded in Stockholm and London using Swedish musicians. Europe bandmate John Norum guest-starred on one of the tracks. Tempest also played guitar on the album. A Place to Call Home which went platinum in Sweden.

Later the same year, he commenced his first European tour as a solo artist. The following year, he was nominated for a "Best Swedish Artist" Grammy. Four singles were taken from the album, "A Place to Call Home", "Under the Influence", "We Come Alive" and "Don't Go Changing On Me".

Tempest's second solo album, Azalea Place, was released in 1997. The next solo album was recorded in Nashville by producer Richard Dodd, who had produced artists such as The Traveling Wilburys and Tom Petty. Where A Place To Call Home had Tempest writing all the material, the new album was written together with others. Among these were Chris Difford from Squeeze and Will Jennings. "Azalea Place was mostly written in the studio and was therefore more improvised and experimental. "The Match", "The One In The Glass" and "If I'd Only Known" were released as singles.

In the autumn of 2002, Tempest released his third solo album named after himself. The production team behind the album was "DeadMono", consisting of Malcolm Pardon and Fredrik Rinman, who had worked with Eskobar, Lisa Miskovsky and Stakka Bo. Also collaborating on the album were Chris Difford, former Europe member Mic Michaeli and guitarist Adam Lamprell. The first session took place in Konk Studios, The Kinks old London studio, where Tempest jammed with the English musicians who had formerly played with Massive Attack. This session produced "Magnificent", "Kill For A Girl Like You" (B-side of the first single "Forgiven") and "Sometimes". Work continued in Stockholm, this time with Swedish musicians, including Mic Michaeli. "Superhuman" originated from this session. After that, Tempest kept on working with Adam Lamprell in a temporary studio in London.

=== Resurrection of Europe ===
Nearly twelve years after disbanding, Europe announced a comeback with the same lineup that made The Final Countdown. In 2004, they released their sixth studio album, Start from the Dark. The seventh, Secret Society, followed in 2006, then Last Look at Eden in 2009, Bag of Bones in 2012, War of Kings in 2015, Walk the Earth in 2017, and Come This Madness in 2026.

== Musicianship ==
Tempest played the keyboards on the first two Europe albums before the band decided to recruit keyboardist Mic Michaeli in April 1984. A couple of years earlier, Tempest had borrowed a keyboard from Michaeli and used it to compose the main keyboard hook of the song "The Final Countdown". After a jam session in 1985, Michaeli and Tempest co-wrote the ballad "Carrie". Later that year, Tempest wrote the soundtrack for the Swedish film On the Loose, as well as the song "Give a Helping Hand" for the benefit project Swedish Metal Aid, in the spirit of Band Aid. The song was produced by future Europe bandmate Kee Marcello. In 1986 Tempest wrote and produced the album One of a Kind for Tone Norum, John Norum's younger sister. Tempest also collaborated with John Norum on the single "We Will Be Strong" from Norum's album Face the Truth in 1992. This was Tempest and Norum's first collaboration since Norum left Europe in November 1986.

After Europe went on hiatus in 1992, Tempest released three solo albums. The first album, A Place to Call Home featured a guest appearance from John Norum on the song "Right to Respect". Several songs on the third album, Joey Tempest, were co-written by Mic Michaeli.

In 2024, Tempest appeared on Swedish progressive rock and metal band Opeth's album The Last Will and Testament by providing guest backing vocals on the track "§2".

== Personal life ==
Tempest lives in London with his wife Lisa Worthington and two sons. Tempest talked to Bruce Dickinson about his decision to live in London on the latter's BBC 6 Music radio show in 2009. He does not have any social media pages apart from the official ones for Europe listed on their website.

Asked in 2009, by BBC's Liam Allen, "Are you ever embarrassed by some of the hairstyles and clothes you wore back in the day?", Tempest replied, "Not really, we were very young, we were MTV generation – we were one of the biggest bands on MTV. I just wanted to look like Robert Plant, to be honest."

== Discography ==
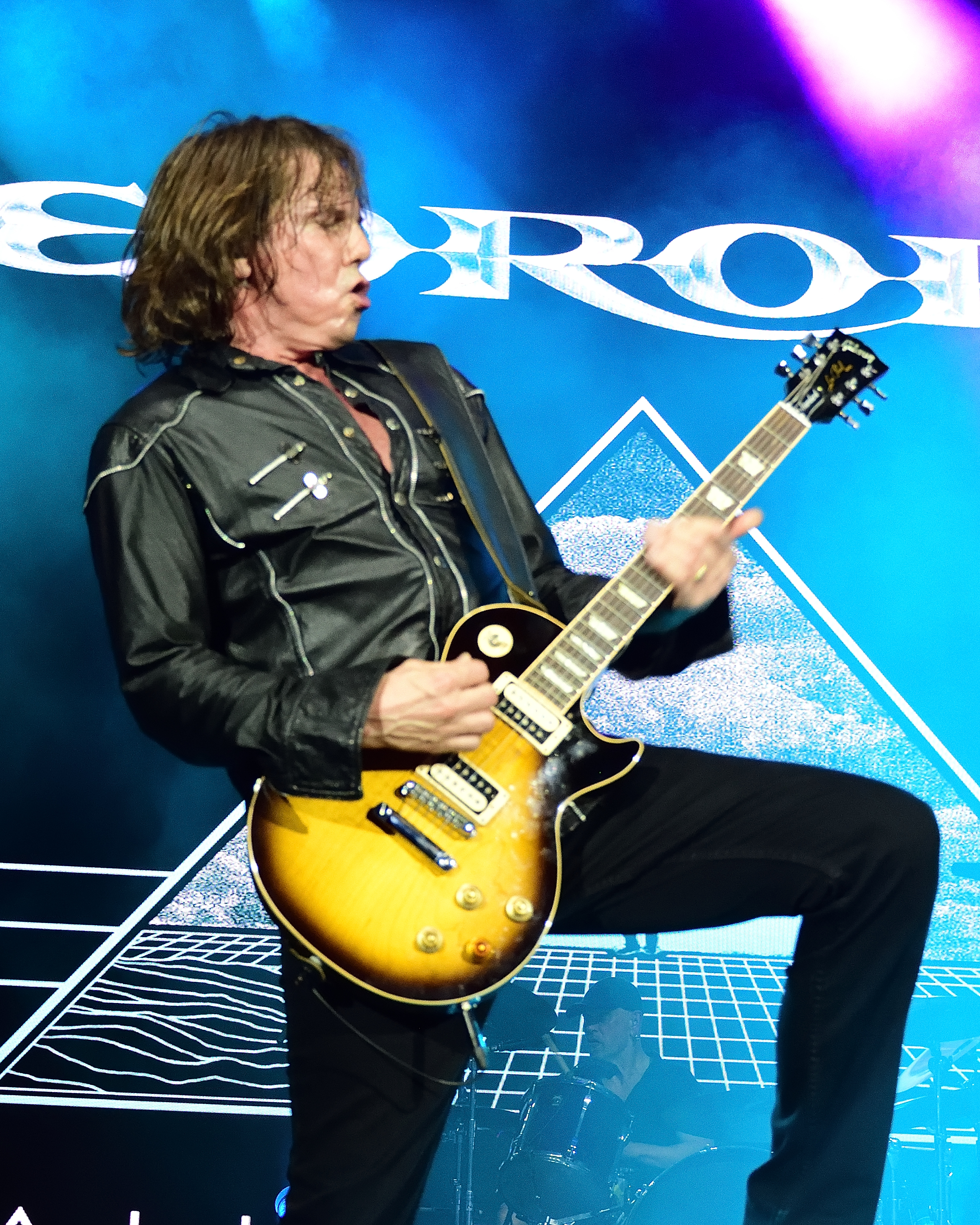
Tempest performing in 2018

=== Solo studio albums ===
- A Place to Call Home (1995)
- Azalea Place (1997)
- Joey Tempest (2002)

=== Studio albums with Europe ===
- Europe (1983)
- Wings of Tomorrow (1984)
- The Final Countdown (1986)
- Out of This World (1988)
- Prisoners in Paradise (1991)
- Start from the Dark (2004)
- Secret Society (2006)
- Last Look at Eden (2009)
- Bag of Bones (2012)
- War of Kings (2015)
- Walk the Earth (2017)
- Come This Madness (2026)

=== Guest appearances ===
- Opeth – The Last Will and Testament (2024) (backing vocals on "§2")
